= Gerry Mulligan Quartet Volume 1 =

Studio album by Gerry Mulligan Quartet
- Released: 1952
- Recorded: August 16, October 15 & 16, 1952; Phil Turetsky's House and Gold Star Studios, Los Angeles, California
- Genre: Jazz
- Label: Pacific Jazz
- Producer: Richard Bock

Gerry Mulligan chronology
| Mulligan Plays Mulligan (1951) | Gerry Mulligan Quartet Volume 1 (1952) | Lee Konitz Plays with the Gerry Mulligan Quartet (1953) |

Gerry Mulligan Quartet Volume 1 is an album by saxophonist and bandleader Gerry Mulligan featuring performances recorded in 1952 and originally released as the first 10-inch LP on the Pacific Jazz label. In 2001 Pacific Jazz released an album on CD with additional tracks from Mulligan's first five recording sessions.

== Reception ==
Professional ratings
Review scores
| Source | Rating |
|---|---|
| Allmusic | 5/5 stars |
| Encyclopedia of Popular Music | 4/5 stars |

The Allmusic review by Ken Dryden noted "Their unique approach to music came to be labeled as "cool" or West Coast jazz, relying on intricate improvisations, with Mulligan's inventive, lyrical baritone being well complemented by Baker, an unschooled player who possessed a gift for playing by ear".

== Track listing ==
All compositions by Gerry Mulligan except as indicated

Original 10 inch LP release:

1. "Frenesí" (Alberto Domínguez) - 3:11
2. "Freeway" (Chet Baker) - 2:46
3. "Soft Shoe" - 2:40
4. "Aren't You Glad You're You?" (Jimmy Van Heusen, Johnny Burke) - 2:52
5. "Bernie's Tune" (Bernie Miller, Jerry Leiber, Mike Stoller) - 2:54
6. "Walkin' Shoes" - 3:13
7. "Nights at the Turntable" - 2:54
8. "Lullaby of the Leaves" (Bernice Petkere, Joe Young) - 3:15
- Recorded at Phil Turetsky's House in Los Angeles, California on August 16, 1952 (tracks 5 & 8) and Gold Star Studios in Los Angeles, California on October 15 & 16, 1952 (tracks 1–4, 6 & 7).

CD Release:

1. "Bernie's Tune" (Miller, Leiber, Stoller) - 2:54
2. "Walking Shoes" - 3:13
3. "Nights at the Turntable" - 2:54
4. "Lullaby of the Leaves" (Petkere, Young) - 3:15
5. "Frenesi" (Dominguez) - 3:11
6. "Freeway" (Baker) - 2:46
7. "Soft Shoe" - 2:40
8. "Aren't You Glad You're You" (Van Heusen, Burke) - 2:52
9. "Utter Chaos #1" - 0:36
10. "Haig and Haig (Dinah)" - 2:58
11. "She Didn't Say Yes, She Didn't Say No" (Jerome Kern, Otto Harbach) - 2:35
12. "Makin' Whoopee" (Walter Donaldson, Gus Kahn) - 3:28
13. "Cherry" (Don Redman, Ray Gilbert) - 2:57
14. "Motel" - 2:37
15. "Carson City Stage" (Carson Smith) - 2:32
16. "Aren't You Glad You're You" [live version] (Van Huesen, Burke) - 3:39
17. "Get Happy" (Harold Arlen, Ted Koehler) - 5:52
18. "Poinciana" (Nat Simon, Buddy Bernier) - 3:52
19. "Godchild" (George Wallington) - 3:56
- Recorded at Phil Turetsky's House in Los Angeles, California on July 9, 1952 (tracks 10 & 11) and August 16, 1952 (tracks 1, 4 & 9), at Gold Star Studios, Los Angeles, California on October 15 & 16, 1952 (tracks 2, 3 & 5–8) and February 24, 1953 (tracks 12–15) and at the Haig, Los Angeles California in early January, 1953 (tracks 16–19)

== Personnel ==
- Gerry Mulligan - baritone saxophone
- Chet Baker - trumpet
- Jimmy Rowles - piano (CD tracks 10 & 11)
- Joe Mondragon (CD tracks 10 & 11), Carson Smith (CD tracks 12–19), Bob Whitlock (LP and CD tracks 1–9) - bass
- Larry Bunker (CD tracks 12–15), Chico Hamilton (LP and CD tracks 1–9 & 16–19) - drums
