= Lee Konitz Plays with the Gerry Mulligan Quartet =

Compilation album by Lee Konitz and the Gerry Mulligan Quartet
- Released: 1957
- Recorded: January 23 & 30 and February 1, 1953
- Studios: The Haig, Hollywood, California unknown studio and Phil Turetsky's House, Los Angeles, California
- Genre: Jazz
- Length: 37:45
- Label: World Pacific
- Producer: Richard Bock

Gerry Mulligan chronology
Gerry Mulligan Quartet Volume 1 (1952)	Lee Konitz Plays with the Gerry Mulligan Quartet (1957)	Gerry Mulligan Quartet Volume 2 (1953)

Lee Konitz chronology
The New Sounds (1951)	Lee Konitz Plays with the Gerry Mulligan Quartet (1953)	Lee Konitz Plays (1953)

PJLP 2 Cover

PJLP 10 Cover

Lee Konitz Plays with the Gerry Mulligan Quartet (also released as Konitz Meets Mulligan) is a compilation album by saxophonist and bandleader Gerry Mulligan's Quartet with Lee Konitz featuring performances recorded in early-1953. The records on the album were originally released on 10-inch LPs Lee Konitz Plays with the Gerry Mulligan Quartet and Lee Konitz and the Gerry Mulligan Quartet on Pacific Jazz Records along with previously unreleased tracks and alternate takes.

== Reception ==
Professional ratings
Review scores
Source	Rating
AllMusic	4.5/5 stars
The Encyclopedia of Popular Music	4/5 stars
The Penguin Guide to Jazz Recordings	3.5/4 stars

The AllMusic review by Ron Wynn called it "a simply wonderful pairing of idiosyncratic talents".

== Track listing ==
1. "Too Marvelous for Words" (Richard A. Whiting, Johnny Mercer) – 3:36 Originally released on PJLP 10
2. "Lover Man" (Jimmy Davis, Ram Ramirez, Jimmy Sherman) – 3:01 Originally released on PJLP 2
3. "I'll Remember April" (Gene de Paul, Patricia Johnston, Don Raye) – 4:08
4. "These Foolish Things" (Jack Strachey, Holt Marvell, Harry Link) – 3:15 Originally released on PJLP 10
5. "All the Things You Are" (Jerome Kern, Oscar Hammerstein II) – 3:55
6. "Bernie's Tune" (Bernie Miller, Jerry Leiber, Mike Stoller) – 3:32 Bonus track on CD reissue
7. "Almost Like Being in Love" (Frederick Loewe, Alan Jay Lerner) – 2:50 Originally released on PJLP 10
8. "Sextet" (Gerry Mulligan) – 2:59 Originally released on PJLP 2
9. "Broadway" (Billy Bird, Teddy McRae, Henry J. Wood) – 2:54 Originally released on PJLP 10
10. "I Can't Believe That You're in Love with Me" (Jimmy McHugh, Clarence Gaskill) – 3:05 Originally released on PJLP 2
11. "Oh, Lady Be Good!" (George Gershwin, Ira Gershwin) – 2:38 Originally released on PJLP 2
12. "Oh, Lady Be Good!" [alternate take] (Gershwin, Gershwin) – 1:52 Bonus track on CD reissue
- Recorded at the Haig club, Los Angeles California on January 23, 1953 (tracks 1–6); at an unidentified studio in Los Angeles, California. on January 30, 1953 (tracks 7–9); and at Phil Turetsky's home studio, Los Angeles, California on February 1, 1953 (tracks 10–12).

== Personnel ==
- Lee Konitz – alto saxophone
- Gerry Mulligan – baritone saxophone - backgrounds 1–6
- Chet Baker – trumpet - backgrounds 1–6
- Joe Mondragon (tracks 10–12), Carson Smith (tracks 1–9) – bass
- Larry Bunker – drums

== Charts ==
Chart performance for Lee Konitz Plays with the Gerry Mulligan Quartet
Chart (2021)	Peak position
German Albums (Offizielle Top 100)	93
