= Gerry Mulligan Quartet Volume 2 =

Studio album by Gerry Mulligan Quartet
- Released: 1953
- Recorded: April 27, 29 & 30, 1953; Radio Recorders, Los Angeles, California
- Genre: Jazz
- Label: Pacific Jazz
- Producer: Richard Bock

Gerry Mulligan chronology
Lee Konitz Plays with the Gerry Mulligan Quartet (1953)	Gerry Mulligan Quartet Volume 2 (1953)	Gene Norman Presents the Original Gerry Mulligan Tentet and Quartet (1953)

Gerry Mulligan Quartet Volume 2 is an album by saxophonist and bandleader Gerry Mulligan featuring performances recorded in 1953 and originally released as a 10-inch LP on the Pacific Jazz label. In 2001 Pacific Jazz re-released the album on CD with additional alternate takes and 12" masters along with five live tracks.

== Reception ==
Professional ratings
Review scores
Source	Rating
Allmusic	5/5 stars
Encyclopedia of Popular Music	4/5 stars

The Allmusic review by Ken Dryden noted "Their unique approach to music came to be labeled as 'cool' or West Coast jazz, relying on intricate improvisations, with Mulligan's inventive, lyrical baritone being well complemented by Baker, an unschooled player who possessed a gift for playing by ear".

== Track listing ==
All compositions by Gerry Mulligan except as indicated

Original 10 inch LP release:

1. "I May Be Wrong" (Henry Sullivan, Harry Ruskin) – 2:53
2. "I'm Beginning to See the Light" (Duke Ellington, Don George, Johnny Hodges, Harry James) – 3:37
3. "The Nearness of You" (Hoagy Carmichael, Ned Washington) – 2:53
4. "Tea for Two" (Vincent Youmans, Irving Caesar) – 2:49
5. "Love Me or Leave Me" (Walter Donaldson, Gus Kahn) – 2:44
6. "Jeru" – 2:30
7. "Darn That Dream" (Jimmy Van Heusen, Eddie DeLange) – 3:50
8. "Swinghouse" – 2:56
- Recorded at Radio Recorders in Hollywood, California on April 27, 1953 (tracks 5, 6 & 8) and April 29 & 30, 1953 (tracks 1–4 & 7).

CD Release:

1. "I May Be Wrong" (Sullivan, Ruskin) – 2:53
2. "I'm Beginning to See the Light" (Ellington, George, Hodges, James) – 3:37
3. "The Nearness of You" (Carmichael, Washington) – 2:53
4. "Tea for Two" (Youmans, Caesar) – 2:49
5. "Love Me or Leave Me" (Donaldson, Kahn) – 2:44
6. "Jeru" – 2:30
7. "Darn That Dream" (Van Heusen, DeLange) – 3:50
8. "Swinghouse" – 2:56
9. "Utter Chaos #2" – 0:32
10. "My Old Flame" (Arthur Johnston, Sam Coslow) – 3:13
11. "Love Me or Leave Me" [alternate take] (Donaldson, Kahn) – 2:49
12. "Swinghouse" [12" Master] – 2:57
13. "Darn That Dream" [alternate take] Van Heusen, DeLange) – 3:23
14. "I May Be Wrong" [12" Master] (Sullivan, Ruskin) – 3:00
15. "I'm Beginning to See the Light" [12" Master] (Ellington, George, Hodges, James) – 3:09
16. "Five Brothers" – 3:00
17. "I Can't Get Started" (Vernon Duke, Ira Gershwin) – 4:03
18. "Ide's Side" – 4:24
19. "Funhouse" – 3:30
20. "My Funny Valentine" (Richard Rodgers, Lorenz Hart) – 5:12

Recorded at Radio Recorders in Hollywood, California on April 27, 1953 (tracks 5, 6 & 8–12 and April 29 & 30, 1953 (tracks 1–4, 7 & 13–15) and at The Haig in Hollywood, California on May 20, 1953 (tracks 16–20).

== Personnel ==
- Gerry Mulligan – baritone saxophone
- Chet Baker – trumpet
- Carson Smith – bass
- Larry Bunker – drums
