= Bob Enevoldsen =

American jazz saxophonist and trombonist (1920–2005)

- Born: Robert Martin Enevoldsen; September 11, 1920; Billings, Montana, U.S.
- Died: November 19, 2005 (aged 85) Woodland Hills, Los Angeles, California, U.S.
- Genres: Jazz
- Instruments: Tenor saxophone Valve trombone

Robert Martin Enevoldsen (September 11, 1920 – November 19, 2005) was a West Coast jazz tenor saxophonist and valve trombonist born in Billings, Montana, known for his work with Marty Paich.

== Career ==
Enevoldsen recorded did sessions with Art Pepper and Shorty Rogers, and later extensively played with Shelly Manne. Enevoldsen did most of the arranging for Steve Allen's Westinghouse show in the early-1960s. During the 1970s, he performed with Gerry Mulligan.

In the mid-1970s Enevoldsen taught arranging and directed the jazz band at Los Angeles Pierce College in Woodland Hills.

== Death ==
Enevoldsen died on November 19, 2005, in Woodland Hills, Los Angeles.

== Discography ==
=== As leader ===
- The Music of Bob Enevoldsen, (Nocturne, 1954; Fresh Sound, 2006) with Marty Paich, Howard Roberts, Harry Babasin, Don Heath, Roy Harte
- Smorgasbord, (Liberty, 1956) with Howard Roberts, Don Heath, Marty Paich, Red Mitchell, Larry Bunker

=== As sideman ===
With Gil Fuller

- Night Flight (Pacific Jazz, 1965)

With Jimmy Giuffre

- Jimmy Giuffre (Capitol, 1955)

With Fred Katz

- Folk Songs for Far Out Folk (Warner Bros., 1958)

With Shelly Manne

- The West Coast Sound (Contemporary, 1953-55 [1955])
- Concerto for Clarinet & Combo (Contemporary, 1957)

With Gerry Mulligan

- Gene Norman Presents the Original Gerry Mulligan Tentet and Quartet (GNP, 1953 [1997])

With Jack Nitzsche

- Heart Beat (Soundtrack) (Capitol, 1980)

With André Previn

- The Subterraneans (MGM, 1960)

With Shorty Rogers

- Shorty Rogers Courts the Count (RCA Victor, 1954)
- The Wild One (Bear Family, 1989)
- Martians Come Back! (Atlantic, 1955 [1956])
- Way Up There (Atlantic, 1955 [1957])
- Portrait of Shorty (RCA Victor, 1958)
- Afro-Cuban Influence (RCA Victor, 1958)
- Chances Are It Swings (RCA Victor, 1958)
- The Wizard of Oz and Other Harold Arlen Songs (RCA Victor, 1959)
- Shorty Rogers Meets Tarzan (MGM, 1960)

With Bud Shank

- Strings & Trombones (Pacific Jazz, 1955)

With Mel Tormé

- Mel Torme Sings Fred Astaire (Bethlehem, 1956)
