= Chico Hamilton Quintet featuring Buddy Collette =

Studio album /Live album by Chico Hamilton Quintet
- Released: 1956
- Recorded: August 4 & 23, 1955
- Venue: The Strollers in Long Beach
- Studios: Radio Recorders in Hollywood, California
- Genre: Jazz
- Label: Pacific Jazz PJ-1209 / ST-20143
- Producer: Richard Bock

Chico Hamilton chronology
Chico Hamilton Quintet featuring Buddy Collette (1956)	The Original Chico Hamilton Quintet (1955)

Chico Hamilton Quintet featuring Buddy Collette (rereleased as Spectacular!) is an album by drummer and bandleader Chico Hamilton's Quintet featuring multi-instrumentalist Buddy Collette, released on the Pacific Jazz label. The album was recorded in 1955 with one side recorded live and the other recorded in the studio.

== Reception ==
Professional ratings
Review scores
Source	Rating
AllMusic	4/5 stars

The AllMusic review by Scott Yanow states: "A chamber jazz unit that hinted in spots at classical music, this cool jazz band was quite popular for a few years."

== Track listing ==
1. "A Nice Day" (Buddy Collette) - 2:53
2. "My Funny Valentine" (Richard Rodgers, Lorenz Hart) - 4:16
3. "Blue Sands" (Collette) - 6:30
4. "The Sage" (Fred Katz) - 3:34
5. "The Morning After" (Chico Hamilton) - 2:07
6. "I Want to Be Happy" (Vincent Youmans, Irving Caesar) - 2:10
7. "Spectacular" (Jim Hall) - 5:12
8. "Free Form" (Hamilton, Collette, Hall, Katz, Smith) - 5:00
9. "Walking Carson Blues" (Carson Smith) - 6:08
10. "Buddy Boo" (Collette) - 6:16
- Recorded at The Strollers club in Long Beach, August 4 (tracks 6–10) and Radio Recorders in Hollywood, August 23 (tracks 1–5)
- Tracks 1, 2, 3, 5 also released on Pacific Jazz EP4-40
- Tracks 7, 9 also released on Pacific Jazz EP4-39

== Personnel ==
- Chico Hamilton - drums
- Buddy Collette - tenor saxophone, alto saxophone, flute, clarinet
- Fred Katz - cello
- Jim Hall - guitar
- Carson Smith - bass

== Uses in other media ==
- "The Sage" is featured in the 1997 film, Boogie Nights.
- "Blue Sands" is featured in the 2022 film, Licorice Pizza.
