= Surf Ride =

Studio album by Art Pepper
- Released: 1956
- Recorded: March 4, 1952, March 29, 1953 and August 25, 1954; Los Angeles, CA
- Genre: Jazz
- Length: 37:25
- Label: Savoy; MG 12089
- Producer: Ozzie Cadena

Art Pepper chronology
The Late Show (1952)	Surf Ride (1956)	Two Altos (1952–54)

Surf Ride is an album by saxophonist Art Pepper featuring sessions from 1952 to 1954 which was originally released as a 12-inch LP on the Savoy label in 1956.

== Reception ==
Professional ratings
Review scores
Source	Rating
AllMusic	3.5/5 stars

The AllMusic review by Scott Yanow observed: "The music on this Savoy LP is quite brilliant, but the packaging leaves something to be desired ... The somewhat random nature of this set is unfortunate, for Pepper is in superior form throughout".

== Track listing ==
All compositions by Art Pepper, except where indicated.

1. "Tickle Toe" (Lester Young) – 2:55
2. "Chili Pepper" – 3:00
3. "Susie the Poodle" – 3:14
4. "Brown Gold" – 2:26
5. "Holiday Flight" – 3:12
6. "Surf Ride" – 2:54
7. "Straight Life" – 2:52
8. "Cinnamon" – 3:11
9. "Thyme Time" – 3:30
10. "The Way You Look Tonight" (Dorothy Fields, Jerome Kern) – 3:48
11. "Nutmeg" – 3:15
12. "Art's Oregano" – 3:08
- Recorded in Los Angeles, CA on March 4, 1952 (tracks 4–6), March 29, 1953 (tracks 1–3) and August 25, 1954 (tracks 7–12)

== Personnel ==
- Art Pepper – alto saxophone
- Jack Montrose – tenor saxophone (tracks 7–12)
- Russ Freeman (tracks 1–3), Hampton Hawes (tracks 4–6), Claude Williamson (tracks 7–12) – piano
- Monty Budwig (tracks 7–12), Joe Mondragon (tracks 4–6), Bob Whitlock (tracks 1–3) – bass
- Larry Bunker (tracks 4–12), Bobby White (tracks 1–3) – drums
