= The Early Show (album) =

Live album by Art Pepper
- Released: 1976
- Recorded: February 12, 1952
- Genre: Jazz
- Label: Xanadu

Professional ratings
Review scores
Source	Rating
The Rolling Stone Jazz Record Guide	4/5 stars

The Early Show is a live album by jazz saxophonist Art Pepper. It was recorded on February 12, 1952, at the Surf Club in Hollywood, Los Angeles. Xanadu Records released the album in 1976 (Xanadu 108).

The Early Show and The Late Show (Xanadu 117) were both recorded the same night at the Surf Club. They represent the earliest recordings with Pepper as leader (Vantage Records has released recordings made in January 1952 at the Lighthouse Café, credited to Pepper, although Shorty Rogers was the leader).

== Track listing ==
1. "How High the Moon"
2. "Suzy the Poodle"
3. "Easy Steppin'"
4. "Tickle Toe"
5. "Patty Cake"
6. "Move"
7. "All the Things You Are"
8. "Don't Blame Me"
9. "Surf Ride"
10. "Rose Room"
11. "Suzy the Poodle (alternate take)"

== Personnel ==
Recorded on February 12, 1952.

- Art Pepper - alto saxophone, clarinet
- Hampton Hawes - piano
- Joe Mondragon - bass guitar
- Larry Bunker - drums, vibes
