= Paris Concert (Gerry Mulligan album) =

Live album by Gerry Mulligan Quartet
- Released: 1955
- Recorded: June 1, 3 & 7, 1954; Salle Pleyel, Paris, France
- Genre: Jazz
- Label: Disques Vogue (France)/Pacific Jazz (USA)

Gerry Mulligan chronology
Gene Norman Presents the Original Gerry Mulligan Tentet and Quartet (1953)	Paris Concert (1955)	California Concerts (1954)

1966 Cover

Paris Concert (also released in France as 3e Salon du Jazz, Paris, 1954, À Pleyel) is a live album by saxophonist and bandleader Gerry Mulligan featuring performances recorded at the Salle Pleyel in Paris in June 1954 and released on the Pacific Jazz label. In 1966, Pacific Jazz released an album with the same title but with a slightly different track listing and edited versions of previously released tracks. The original recordings were made by Disques Vogue who issued the recordings in France.

== Reception ==
Professional ratings
Review scores
Source	Rating
AllMusic	4.5/5 stars
Encyclopedia of Popular Music	4/5 stars

The AllMusic review by Scott Yanow described the album as containing "Cool jazz at its best, played with plenty of wit and creativity.".

== Track listing ==
All compositions by Gerry Mulligan, except as indicated

1. "Come Out, Come Out, Wherever You Are" (Jule Styne, Sammy Cahn) - 3:54
2. "Five Brothers" - 4:40
3. "Laura" (David Raksin, Johnny Mercer) - 4:10
4. "Love Me or Leave Me" (Walter Donaldson, Gus Kahn) - 5:10
5. "Utter Chaos" - 0:43
6. "Bernie's Tune" (Bernie Miller, Jerry Leiber, Mike Stoller) - 4:23
7. "Walkin' Shoes" - 5:05
8. "Moonlight in Vermont" (Karl Suessdorf, John Blackburn) - 3:11
9. "The Lady Is a Tramp" (Richard Rodgers, Lorenz Hart) - 3:36
10. "Utter Chaos" - 0:49
- Recorded at the Salle Pleyel in Paris, France, on June 1, 1954 (tracks 6 & 7), June 3, 1954 (tracks 2, 9 & 10) and June 7, 1954 (tracks 1, 3, 4, 5 & 8).

1966 Release

1. "Come Out, Come Out, Wherever You Are" (Styne, Cahn) - 2:35
2. "Five Brothers" - 3:40
3. "Makin' Whoopee" (Donaldson, Kahn) - 2:36
4. "Laura" (Raskin, Mercer) - 4:05
5. "Love Me or Leave Me" (Donaldson, Kahn) 4:42
6. "Bernie's Tune" (Miller, Leiber, Stoller) - 4:01
7. "Walkin' Shoes" - 4:35
8. "Soft Shoe" - 3:52
9. "Moonlight in Vermont" (Suessdorf, Blackburn) - 3:09
10. "Motel" - 3:35
- Recorded at the Salle Pleyel in Paris, France, on June 1, 1954 (tracks 6, 7 & 10), June 3, 1954 (tracks 2, 3 & 8) and June 7, 1954 (tracks 1, 4 5 & 9).

== Personnel ==
- Gerry Mulligan - baritone saxophone
- Bob Brookmeyer - valve trombone
- Red Mitchell - bass
- Frank Isola - drums
