= Gene Norman Presents the Original Gerry Mulligan Tentet and Quartet =

Compilation album by Gerry Mulligan Tentet and Quartet
- Released: 1954
- Recorded: January 29 & 31 and May 7, 1953
- Studios: Capitol Recording Studios, Hollywood, California and Los Angeles, California
- Genre: Jazz
- Label: GNP
- Producer: Gene Norman

Gerry Mulligan chronology
Gerry Mulligan Quartet Volume 2 (1953)	Gene Norman Presents the Original Gerry Mulligan Tentet and Quartet (1954)	Paris Concert (1954)

Ten-tette Cover

Quartet Cover

Gene Norman Presents the Original Gerry Mulligan Tentet and Quartet is a compilation album by saxophonist and bandleader Gerry Mulligan featuring performances recorded in 1953 and originally released as two 10 inch LPs, one on the Gene Norman Presents label and one on Capitol.

== Reception ==
Professional ratings
Review scores
Source	Rating
Allmusic	4/5 stars

The Allmusic review by Gregg Juke observed "For those interested in the '50s West Coast scene, or new fans looking for quintessential Gerry Mulligan, look no further than Tentet and Quartet".

== Track listing ==
All compositions by Gerry Mulligan except where noted.

1. "Westwood Walk" - 2:33
2. "Simbah" - 2:57
3. "Walkin' Shoes" - 3:37
4. "Rocker" - 2:27
5. "A Ballad" - 2:53
6. "Taking a Chance on Love" (Vernon Duke, Ted Fetter, John La Touche) - 2:50
7. "Flash" - 3:14
8. "Ontet" - 3:14
9. "Varsity Drag" (Ray Henderson, Lew Brown, Buddy DeSylva) - 2:20
10. "Speak Low" (Kurt Weill, Ogden Nash) - 2:09
11. "Half Nelson" (Miles Davis) - 3:00
12. "Lady Bird" (Tadd Dameron) - 4:28
13. "Love Me or Leave Me" (Walter Donaldson, Gus Kahn) - 3:25
14. "Swing House" - 3:18

Note

- Recorded at Capitol Recording Studios in Hollywood, California on January 29, 1953 (tracks 1, & 3–5) and January 31, 1953 (tracks 2 & 6–8) and in Los Angeles, California on May 7, 1953 (tracks 9–14)

== Personnel ==
- Gerry Mulligan - baritone saxophone, piano
- Chet Baker (tracks 1–14), Pete Candoli (tracks 1–8) - trumpet
- Bob Enevoldsen - valve trombone (tracks 1–8)
- John Graas - French horn (tracks 1–8)
- Ray Siegel - tuba (tracks 1–8)
- Bud Shank - alto saxophone (tracks 1–8)
- Don Davidson - baritone saxophone (tracks 1–8)
- Joe Mondragon (tracks 1–8), Carson Smith (tracks 9–14) - bass
- Larry Bunker (tracks 2 & 6–14), Chico Hamilton (tracks 1 & 3–5) - drums
