= Strings & Trombones =

Studio album by Bud Shank with Bob Brookmeyer
- Released: 1956
- Recorded: April 3, June 22 & November 29, 1954, and January 7, 1955
- Studio: Capitol, Melrose Ave (Hollywood); Radio Recorders (Los Angeles)
- Genre: Jazz
- Label: Pacific Jazz; PJ 1213
- Producer: Richard Bock

Bud Shank chronology
Laurindo Almeida Quartet Featuring Bud Shank (1953-54)	Strings & Trombones (1956)	Bud Shank – Shorty Rogers – Bill Perkins (1954-55)

Strings & Trombones is an album by Bud Shank, featuring Bob Brookmeyer, which was recorded in 1954 and 1955 for the Pacific Jazz label. The album compiles Shank's earlier 10-inch LPs Bud Shank and Bob Brookmeyer and Bud Shank and Three Trombones.

== Reception ==
Professional ratings
Review scores
Source	Rating
AllMusic	3/5 stars

Allmusic rated the album with three stars.

== Track listing ==
1. "Low Life" (Johnny Mandel) - 3:56
2. "With the Wind and the Rain in Your Hair" (Jack Lawrence, Clara Edwards) - 5:07
3. "You Are Too Beautiful" (Richard Rodgers, Lorenz Hart) - 3:59
4. "When Your Lover Has Gone" (Einar Aaron Swan) - 2:56
5. "Rustic Hop" (Bob Brookmeyer) - 4:13
6. "Wailing Vessel" (Bob Cooper) - 2:41
7. "Cool Fool" (Cooper) - 3:18
8. "Little Girl Blue" (Rodgers, Hart) - 3:16
9. "Sing Something Simple" (Herman Hupfeld) - 2:35
10. "You Don't Know What Love Is" (Don Raye, Gene de Paul) - 4:16
11. "Valve in Head" (Bud Shank) - 3:10

== Personnel ==
- Bud Shank - alto saxophone
- Bob Brookmeyer (tracks 1–5), Bob Enevoldsen (tracks 6–11), Maynard Ferguson (tracks 6–11), Stu Williamson (tracks 6–11) - valve trombone
- Claude Williamson - piano
- Buddy Clark (tracks 1, 2 & 5), Joe Mondragon (tracks 3, 4 & 6–11) - bass
- Larry Bunker (tracks 1–5), Shelly Manne (tracks 6–11) - drums
- String section arranged by Bob Cooper (tracks 1–5)
