= Bud Shank Plays Music from Today's Movies =

Studio album by Bud Shank
- Released: 1967
- Recorded: 1967; Los Angeles, CA
- Genre: Jazz
- Labels: World Pacific; WP 1864
- Producer: Richard Bock

Bud Shank chronology
A Spoonful of Jazz (1967)	Bud Shank Plays Music from Today's Movies (1967)	Magical Mystery (1967)

Bud Shank Plays Music from Today's Movies is an album by saxophonist Bud Shank recorded in 1967 for the World Pacific label.

== Reception ==
Professional ratings
Review scores
Source	Rating
AllMusic	3/5 stars

AllMusic rated the album with 3 stars.

== Track listing ==
1. "Theme from Warning Shot" (Jerry Goldsmith) - 2:00
2. "Georgy Girl" (Tom Springfield, Jim Dale) - 2:51
3. "Any Wednesday" (Alan Bergman, Marilyn Bergman, George Duning) - 2:32
4. "Watch What Happens" (Michel Legrand, Norman Gimbel) - 2:58
5. "Two Weeks in September" (Frank Lake, Thomas Kaye) - 3:41
6. "Venice After Dark" (Lalo Schifrin) - 2:16
7. "The Pin" (Schifrin) - 2:32
8. "Love Is Stronger Then We (Plus Fort Que Nous)" (Francis Lai, Pierre Barouh, Jerry Keller) - 2:42
9. "Luv" (Gerry Mulligan) - 2:26
10. "Theme from "The Sand Pebbles" (And We Were Lovers)" (Goldsmith) - 2:52
11. "This Year" (Johnny Keating, (Johnny Worth) - 2:53
12. "Hurry Sundown" (Hugo Montenegro, Buddy Kaye) - 2:29

== Personnel ==
- Bud Shank - alto saxophone
- Jimmy Zito - flugelhorn
- Mike Melvoin - organ, harpsichord
- Dennis Budimir, Herb Ellis - guitar
- Ray Brown - bass
- Frank Capp - drums
- Victor Feldman - vibraphone, percussion
- Unidentified orchestra arranged and conducted by Bob Florence
