= Flower Drum Song (album) =

Studio album by The Mastersounds
- Released: 1959
- Recorded: December 4, 1958; Los Angeles, CA
- Genre: Jazz
- Label: World Pacific WP 1252
- Producer: Richard Bock

The Mastersounds chronology
Kismet (1958)	Flower Drum Song (1959)	Ballads & Blues (1959)

Flower Drum Song (subtitled A Jazz Interpretation by the Mastersounds) is an album by The Mastersounds led by vibraphonist Buddy Montgomery with pianist Richie Crabtree, bassist Monk Montgomery and drummer Benny Barth featuring performances of tunes from Richard Rodgers and Oscar Hammerstein II musical Flower Drum Song recorded in 1958 and released on the World Pacific label.

== Reception ==
Professional ratings
Review scores
Source	Rating
Allmusic	4/5 stars

The Allmusic review by Scott Yanow stated "In general, the music is pretty and relaxed, but not too invigorating. None of the themes from the show ended up catching on. The Mastersounds, who cannot help sounding a bit like the Modern Jazz Quartet in spots, play quite well, but this LP falls short of being essential".

== Track listing ==
All compositions by Richard Rodgers and Oscar Hammerstein II

1. "Overture: Chop Suey/Grant Avenue/Sunday/You Are Beautiful" - 7:30
2. "Sunday" - 3:40
3. "Love Look Away" - 4:37
4. "Grant Avenue" - 4:47
5. "Chop Suey" - 3:03
6. "You Are Beautiful" - 4:07
7. "I'm Going to Like It Here" - 6:00

== Personnel ==
- Buddy Montgomery - vibraphone
- Richie Crabtree - piano
- Monk Montgomery - Fender electric bass
- Benny Barth - drums
