= This Rather Than That =

Studio album by Buddy Montgomery
- Released: 1970
- Recorded: September 10 & 11, 1969
- Genre: Jazz
- Length: 40:15
- Label: Impulse!
- Producer: Ed Michel

Buddy Montgomery chronology
The Two Sided Album (1968)	This Rather Than That (1970)	Ties of Love (1987)

This Rather Than That is an album by American jazz vibraphonist and pianist Buddy Montgomery recorded in 1969 for the Impulse! label.

== Reception ==
The Allmusic review awarded the album 3 stars.

Professional ratings
Review scores
Source	Rating
Allmusic	3/5 stars

== Track listing ==
All compositions by Buddy Montgomery except as indicated

1. "This Rather Than That" - 3:53
2. "Tin Tin Deo" (Chano Pozo) - 5:30
3. "Rose Bud" - 5:48
4. "Stormy" (Buddy Buie, J. R. Cobb) - 5:35
5. "Willy Nilly Blues" - 6:35
6. "Beautiful Love" (Egbert Van Alstyne, Haven Gillespie, Victor Young, Wayne King) - 5:22
7. "Didn't We" (Jimmy Webb) - 3:12
8. "Winding Up" - 4:20

- Recorded at Universal Recorders in Chicago, Illinois on September 10 & 11, 1969

== Personnel ==
- Buddy Montgomery - vibraphone, piano
- Jodie Christian - piano (tracks 4 & 5)
- Melvin Rhyne - organ (tracks 1, 2, 6 & 8)
- Manty Ellis - guitar (tracks 4 & 5)
- Jimmy Rowser - bass (tracks 3 & 4)
- Monk Montgomery - Fender bass (tracks 1, 2, 5, 6 & 8)
- George Brown - drums
