= The Trumpet Artistry of Chet Baker =

Compilation album by Chet Baker
- Released: 1955
- Recorded: July 29 & 30, October 3, December 22, 1953 and September 9 & 15, 1954
- Studio: Capitol, 5515 Melrose, Hollywood; Radio Recorders, Los Angeles
- Genre: Jazz
- Length: 37:53
- Label: Pacific Jazz; PJ 1206
- Producer: Richard Bock

Chet Baker chronology
Pretty/Groovy (1953-54)	The Trumpet Artistry of Chet Baker (1955)	Witch Doctor (1954)

The Trumpet Artistry of Chet Baker is an album by jazz trumpeter Chet Baker recorded in 1953 and 1954 and released on the Pacific Jazz label. The album compiles tracks previously released on the 1954 10 inch LP Chet Baker Sextet along with previously unissued recordings.

== Reception ==
Professional ratings
Review scores
Source	Rating
Allmusic	3/5 stars

Allmusic rated the album with 3 stars stating "This well-rounded LP features the very popular trumpeter in his early days... those listeners running across this LP will find it a perfect introduction to the music of the early Chet Baker".

== Track listing ==
1. "I'm Glad There Is You" (Jimmy Dorsey, Paul Mertz) - 3:10
2. "Moon Love" (Jerome Kern, George Grossmith, Jr., P. G. Wodehouse) - 3:15
3. "Moonlight Becomes You" (Johnny Burke, Jimmy Van Heusen) - 3:24
4. "Imagination" (Burke, Van Heusen) - 3:01
5. "Little Man, You've Had a Busy Day" (Al Hoffman, Maurice Sigler, Mabel Wayne) - 4:44
6. "Goodbye" (Gordon Jenkins) - 3:50
7. "All the Things You Are" (Jerome Kern, Oscar Hammerstein II) - 2:57
8. "No Ties" (Russ Freeman) - 3:01
9. "Happy Little Sunbeam" (Freeman) - 2:45
10. "Bea's Flat" (Freeman) - 2:58
11. "Russ Job" (Freeman) - 2:54
12. "Tommy Hawk" (Johnny Mandel) - 3:39
- Recorded in Los Angeles on July 29 & 30, 1953 (tracks 4 & 11), at Radio Recorders in Hollywood on October 3, 1953 (tracks 2 & 7–10), at Capitol Studios in Hollywood on December 22, 1953 (tracks 3 & 6) and in Los Angeles on September 9, 1954 (track 12) and September 15, 1954 (tracks 1 & 5)

== Personnel ==
- Chet Baker - trumpet
- Bob Brookmeyer - valve trombone (tracks 1, 5 & 12)
- Herb Geller - alto saxophone, tenor saxophone (tracks 3 & 6)
- Jack Montrose - tenor saxophone (tracks 3 & 6)
- Bob Gordon (tracks 3 & 6), Bud Shank (tracks 1, 5 & 12) - baritone saxophone
- Russ Freeman - piano
- Joe Mondragon (tracks 3 & 6), Carson Smith (tracks 1, 5 & 12), Bob Whitlock (tracks 2, 4 & 7–11) - bass
- Shelly Manne (tracks 1, 3, 5, 6 & 12), Bobby White (tracks 2, 4 & 7–11) - drums
