= Jazz at Ann Arbor =

Live album by Chet Baker
- Released: 1955
- Recorded: May 9, 1954; Masonic Temple, Ann Arbor, Michigan
- Genre: Jazz
- Length: 45:57
- Label: Pacific Jazz; PJ 1203
- Producer: Richard Bock

Chet Baker chronology
Chet Baker & Strings (1953)	Jazz at Ann Arbor (1955)	Chet Baker Sings and Plays (1955)

Jazz at Ann Arbor is a live album by jazz trumpeter Chet Baker which was recorded at the Masonic Temple in 1954 and released on the Pacific Jazz label.

== Reception ==
Professional ratings
Review scores
Source	Rating
Allmusic	4.5/5 stars

Lindsay Planer of Allmusic states, "Chet Baker was arguably at the peak of his prowess when captured in a quartet setting at the Masonic Temple in Ann Arbor, MI, May 9, 1954".

== Track listing ==
1. "Line for Lyons" (Gerry Mulligan) - 6:45
2. "Lover Man" (James Sherman, Ram Ramirez, Jimmy Davis) - 5:45
3. "My Funny Valentine" (Lorenz Hart, Richard Rodgers) - 4:55
4. "Maid in Mexico" (Russ Freeman) - 4:48
5. "Stella By Starlight" (Ned Washington, Victor Young) - 4:17
6. "My Old Flame" (Arthur Johnson, Sam Coslow) - 5:55
7. "Headline" (Jack Montrose) - 3:55
8. "Russ Job" (Freeman) - 5:55

== Personnel ==
- Chet Baker - trumpet
- Russ Freeman - piano
- Carson Smith - bass
- Bob Neel - drums
