= Ten Trumpets and 2 Guitars =

Studio album by Pete Rugolo and Orchestra
- Released: 1961
- Recorded: June 7, 8 & 9, 1961
- Studio: United Recording Studios, Hollywood, CA
- Genre: Jazz
- Label: Mercury; PPS 2016/PPS 6016
- Producer: David Carroll

Pete Rugolo chronology
The Original Music of Thriller (1961)	Ten Trumpets and 2 Guitars (1961)	10 Saxophones and 2 Basses (1961)

Ten Trumpets and 2 Guitars is an album by composer, arranger and conductor Pete Rugolo featuring performances recorded in 1961 and first released on the Mercury label as part of its audiophile Perfect Presence Sound Series.

== Reception ==
Professional ratings
Review scores
Source	Rating
Allmusic	4/5 stars

The Allmusic review by arwulf arwulf noted: "Ten Trumpets and Two Guitars showcases a skilled team of brass players who juggle trumpets and flugelhorns backed by a solid rhythm section featuring guitarists Howard Roberts and Al Viola. Although some of Rugolo's arrangements contain squirrel-like passages, most of the textures encountered here are characteristically cool and firmly rooted in traditional jazz."

== Track listing ==
All compositions by Pete Rugolo except where noted.

1. "Carnival of Venice" - 2:42
2. "Hot Lips" (Henry Busse, Henry Lange, Lou Davis) - 1:57
3. "Cherry Pink and Apple Blossom White" (Louiguy, Mack David) - 2:25
4. "Struttin' with Some Barbecue" (Lil Hardin Armstrong, Don Raye) - 2:23
5. "Trumpets at Large" - 2:20
6. "Guitarsville" - 2:35
7. "Ciribiribin" - 2:18
8. "Sugar Blues" (Clarence Williams, Lucy Fletcher) - 2:23
9. "Whispering" (Vincent Rose, John Schonberger, Richard Coburn) - 1:38
10. "Echoes of Harlem" (Duke Ellington) - 3:21
11. "Ten Trumpets Have I" - 1:50
12. "Two Guitars" - 3:24
- Recorded at United Recording Studios, Hollywood, CA on June 7, 1961 (tracks 2, 3, 7 & 9), June 8, 1961 (tracks 1, 4, 8 & 10), and June 9, 1961 (tracks 5, 6, 11 & 12).

== Personnel ==
- Pete Rugolo - arranger, conductor
- Frank Beach (tracks 1–5 & 7–11), Bud Brisbois (tracks 2, 3, 5, 7, 9 & 11), Conte Candoli (tracks 1–5 & 7–11), Pete Candoli (tracks 1–5 & 7–11), Don Fagerquist (tracks 1, 4, 5, 8, 10 & 11) Mannie Klein (tracks 1–5 & 7–11), Cappy Lewis (tracks 1–5 & 7–11), Ollie Mitchell (tracks 1–5 & 7–11), Uan Rasey (tracks 1–5 & 7–11), Joe Triscari (tracks 1–5 & 7–11), Ray Triscari (tracks 1–4 & 7–10) - trumpet, flugelhorn
- Larry Bunker - vibraphone, percussion, cymbals
- Howard Roberts, Al Viola - guitar
- Joe Mondragon - bass
- Shelly Manne (tracks 5, 6, 11 & 12), Alvin Stoller (tracks 1–4 & 7–10) - drums
