= Kismet (The Mastersounds album) =

Studio album by The Mastersounds
- Released: 1958
- Recorded: April 22, 1958; Forum Theatre, Los Angeles, CA
- Genre: Jazz
- Label: World Pacific PJ 1243
- Producer: Richard Bock

The Mastersounds chronology
The King and I (1957)	Kismet (1958)	Flower Drum Song (1958)

Kismet (subtitled A Jazz Interpretation by the Mastersounds) is an album by The Mastersounds led by vibraphonist Buddy Montgomery with pianist Richie Crabtree, bassist Monk Montgomery and drummer Benny Barth along with guitarist Wes Montgomery featuring performances of tunes originally composed by Alexander Borodin and adapted by Robert Wright and George Forrest for the musical Kismet. The album was recorded in 1958 and released on the World Pacific label.

== Reception ==
Professional ratings
Review scores
Source	Rating
Allmusic	4.5/5 stars

The Allmusic review by Matthew Greenwald stated: "Overall, an excellent jazz reading of one of the most beloved musicals ever and also an important historical record for Wes Montgomery fans".

== Track listing ==
All compositions by Alexander Borodin, Robert Wright and George Forrest

1. "Overture: Not Since Nineveh/Olive Tree/Stranger in Paradise/And This Is My Beloved/Night of Nights/Sands of Time" – 6:47
2. "Gesticulate and Rhymes Have I" – 2:56
3. "Olive Tree" – 4:58
4. "Not Since Nineveh" – 7:20
5. "Baubles, Bangles, & Beads" – 3:25
6. "Fate" – 5:16
7. "And This Is My Beloved" – 6:22
8. "Stranger in Paradise" – 4:51

== Personnel ==
- Buddy Montgomery – vibraphone
- Richie Crabtree – piano
- Wes Montgomery – guitar (tracks 1 & 3–8)
- Monk Montgomery – Fender electric bass
- Benny Barth – drums
