= Nocturne Records =

American jazz record label (founded 1954)

Nocturne Records was an American jazz record company and label founded in 1954 by Roy Harte, a drummer, and Harry Babasin, a bassist. Based in Hollywood, California, Nocturne concentrated on West Coast jazz.

On March 28, 1955, Nocturne merged with Liberty and issued the Nocturne catalog under the Liberty label, as the "Jazz in Hollywood" series. Babasin, president of Nocturne, remained to supervise the repertoire.

Roy Harte also co-founded Pacific Jazz Records in 1952.

In 1988, Fresh Sound reissued a digitally remastered CD box-set of The Complete Nocturne Recordings: Jazz in Hollywood Series.

== Discography ==
- Herbie Harper, Herbie Harper Quintet Featuring Bob Gordon (Nocturne NLP 1, 1954; OJCCD-1887, 1997)
- Bud Shank Quintet, Compositions of Shorty Rogers (NLP 2, 1954; OJCCD-1890, 1997)
- Harry Babasin, Harry Babasin Quintet (NLP 3, 1954; OJCCD-1888, 1997)
- Conley Graves, The Piano Artistry of Conley Graves (NLP 4, 1954)
- Earl Hines, Earl "Fatha" Hines and His New Sounds (NLP 5, 1954)
- Bob Enevoldsen, Bob Enevoldsen Quintet (NLP 6, 1954; OJCCD-1888, 1997)
- Herbie Harper, Herbie Harper Quartet/Quintet (NLP 7, 1954; OJCCD-1887, 1997)
- Virgil Gonsalves, Virgil Gonsalves Sextet (NLP 8, 1954; OJCCD-1889, 1997)
- Steve White, Steve White Quartet/Quintet (NLP 9, 1954; 1st issue: Original Jazz Classics OJCCD-1889, 1997)
- Lou Levy, The Lou Levy Trio (NLP 10, 1954; 1st issue: Fresh Sound, 608, 1988; OJCCD-1890, 1997)
- Peggy Connelly, Peggy Connelly Sings (NLP 11, 1954; 1st issue: Fresh Sound 607, 1987) note: split album, one side is Peggy Connelly (4 tracks), and the other side is Tommy Traynor (4 tracks)
- Steve White, Steve White Quartet (all previously unreleased material...no duplication with NLP 9, 1954; 1st issue: Original Jazz Classics OJCCD-1891, 1997)
- The Complete Nocturne Recordings: Jazz In Hollywood Series – Volume One (Fresh Sound NR3CD-101, 1998) 3-CD set; this anthology includes the original seven albums by Herbie Harper (2), Bud Shank, Harry Babasin, Bob Enevoldsen, Virgil Gonsalves, Lou Levy, plus a complete album by the Jimmy Rowles Trio (originally issued as Liberty LRP 3003; but could probably be considered to be release NLP 12).
