= Live at Maybeck Recital Hall, Volume Fifteen =

Live album by Buddy Montgomery
- Released: 1992
- Recorded: July 14, 1991
- Venue: Maybeck Recital Hall (Berkeley, Calif.)
- Genre: Jazz
- Length: 1:06:50
- Label: Concord CCD-4494
- Producer: Carl Jefferson

Buddy Montgomery chronology
So Why Not? (1988)	Live at Maybeck Recital Hall, Volume Fifteen (1992)	Here Again (1997)

Live at Maybeck Recital Hall, Volume Fifteen is a 1992 live album by jazz pianist Buddy Montgomery, recorded at the Maybeck Recital Hall in Berkeley, California.

== Reception ==
Professional ratings
Review scores
Source	Rating
Allmusic	3/5 stars
The Penguin Guide to Jazz	3/4 stars

The album was positively reviewed by Richard S. Ginell at Allmusic who wrote that Montgomery "has more than enough of the solid musicianship and abundant technique that seems to go with the territory in this series", though Ginell felt that Montgomery's "solo ruminations, however accomplished, aren't all that compelling here". Ginell highlighted "Who Cares" and "Money Blues" as stand out tracks. The authors of The Penguin Guide to Jazz Recordings called the album "the best introduction" to Montgomery's music, and stated that his "delicate but insistent touch is just right for the acoustic."

== Track listing ==
1. "Since I Fell for You" (Buddy Johnson) – 5:25
2. "A Cottage for Sale" (Larry Conley, Willard Robison) – 5:19
3. "Who Cares?" (George Gershwin, Ira Gershwin) – 5:23
4. "The Night Has a Thousand Eyes" (Buddy Bernier, Jerry Brainin) – 3:35
5. "What'll I Do" (Irving Berlin) – 4:49
6. "You've Changed" (Bill Carey, Carl T. Fischer) – 5:45
7. "Money Blues" (G.C. Coleman, Harry Eller, Dave Leader) – 5:59
8. "This Time I'll Be Sweeter" (Haras Fyre, Gwen Guthrie) – 5:45
9. "Soft Winds" (Benny Goodman) – 4:04
10. "My Lord and Master"/"Something Wonderful" (Oscar Hammerstein II, Richard Rodgers) – 6:52
11. "The Man I Love" (G. Gershwin, I. Gershwin) – 3:54
12. "How to Handle a Woman" (Frederick Loewe, Alan Jay Lerner) – 4:52
13. "By Myself" (Howard Dietz, Arthur Schwartz) – 5:00

== Personnel ==
- Buddy Montgomery – piano
- Kent Judkins - art direction
- Barbara Fisher - assistant engineer
- John Burk - assistant producer
- David Luke - engineer
- Derek Richardson - liner notes
- George Horn - mastering
- James Gudeman - photography
- Carl Jefferson - producer
