= Chico Hamilton Trio =

Studio album by Chico Hamilton Trio
- Released: 1956
- Recorded: December 6, 1953, October 2, 1954 and February 8, 1956; Hollywood, CA
- Genre: Jazz
- Label: Pacific Jazz PJ-1220
- Producer: Richard Bock

Chico Hamilton chronology
Chico Hamilton Quintet in Hi Fi (1956)	Chico Hamilton Trio (1956)	Chico Hamilton Quintet (1956)

The Chico Hamilton Trio album, recorded by drummer and bandleader Chico Hamilton, features sessions from 1953, 1954, and 1956 and was released on the Pacific Jazz label. The album includes Hamilton's initial recordings for Pacific Jazz in 1953 and 1954, originally released as six tracks on a 10-inch album, plus four additional recordings from 1956.

== Reception ==
Professional ratings
Review scores
Source	Rating
AllMusic	3/5 stars
Disc	5/5 stars
The Penguin Guide to Jazz Recordings	3/4 stars

The AllMusic review by Michael G. Nastos states: "An entry point recording for Chico Hamilton, it displays his savory good common sense well before being more trend and fashion conscious, as psychedelia and fusion took over commercialized jazz."

== Track listing ==
1. "Blues on the Rocks" (George Duvivier) - 3:05
2. "Street of Drums" (Chico Hamilton) - 3:20
3. "We'll Be Together Again" (Carl T. Fischer, Frankie Laine) - 2:50
4. "Skinned Strings" (Hamilton, Duvivier) - 5:12
5. "Nuttye" (Jimmy Cheatham) - 2:27
6. "Porch Light" (Duvivier) - 3:58
7. "Broadway" (Billy Bird, Teddy McRae, Henri Woode) - 3:03
8. "Autumn Landscape" (Duvivier) - 3:45
9. "Uganda" (Hamilton, Duvivier) - 4:45
10. "Lollypop" (Gerald Wiggins, Hamilton) - 2:14
- Recorded at Sound Stage Studio, Hollywood on December 6, 1953 (tracks 2, 5 & 7) and October 2, 1954 (tracks 3, 9 & 10) and Music Box Theatre, Hollywood, on February 8, 1956 (tracks 1, 4, 6 & 8)

== Personnel ==
- Chico Hamilton - drums
- Jim Hall (tracks 1, 4, 6 & 8), Howard Roberts (tracks 2, 3, 5, 7, 9 & 10) - guitar
- George Duvivier - bass
