= Buddy Montgomery =

American jazz vibraphonist and pianist (1930–2009)

Background information
- Born: Charles Montgomery; January 30, 1930; Indianapolis, Indiana, United States
- Died: May 14, 2009 (aged 79) Palmdale, California, United States
- Genres: Jazz
- Occupation: Musician
- Instruments: Piano, vibraphone

Charles "Buddy" Montgomery (January 30, 1930 – May 14, 2009) was an American jazz vibraphonist and pianist. He was the younger brother of Wes and Monk Montgomery, a guitarist and bassist respectively.

Buddy and brother Monk formed The Mastersounds in the late 1950s and produced ten recordings. When The Mastersounds disbanded, Monk and Buddy joined their brother Wes on a number of Montgomery Brothers recordings, which were mostly arranged by Buddy. They toured together in 1968, and it was in the middle of that tour that Wes died. Buddy continued to compose, arrange, perform, produce, teach and record, producing nine recordings as a leader.

== Biography ==
Buddy first played professionally in 1948; in 1949 he played with Big Joe Turner and soon afterwards with Slide Hampton. After a period in the Army, where he had his own quartet, he joined The Mastersounds as a vibraphonist with his brother Monk, pianist Richie Crabtree and drummer Benny Barth in 1957. He led the "Montgomery-Johnson Quintet" with saxophonist Alonzo "Pookie" Johnson from 1955 to 1957. Montgomery's earliest sessions as a leader are from the late 1950s. He played briefly with Miles Davis in 1960. After Wes Montgomery's death in 1968, Buddy became active as a jazz educator and advocate. He founded organizations in Milwaukee, where he lived from 1969 to 1982, and Oakland, California, where he lived for most of the 1980s, that offered jazz classes and presented free concerts. He died in Palmdale, California, of a heart attack, aged 79.

== Discography ==
=== The Mastersounds ===
- Jazz Showcase (World Pacific, 1957)
- The King and I (World Pacific, 1957)
- Kismet (World Pacific, 1958) with Wes Montgomery
- Flower Drum Song (World Pacific, 1958)
- Ballads & Blues (World Pacific, 1959)
- The Mastersounds in Concert (World Pacific, 1959)
- Happy Holidays from Many Lands (World Pacific, 1959)
- The Mastersounds Play Horace Silver (World Pacific, 1960)
- Swinging with the Mastersounds (Fantasy, 1961)
- The Mastersounds on Tour (1961)
- A Date with The Mastersounds (Fantasy, 1961)

=== Buddy Montgomery ===
- The Two-Sided Album (Milestone, 1968)
- This Rather Than That (Impulse!, 1969)
- Ties (Bean, 1977)
- Ties of Love (Landmark, 1986)
- So Why Not? (Landmark, 1988)
- Live at Maybeck Recital Hall (Concord Jazz, 1991)
- Here Again (Sharp Nine, 1997)
- Icebreaker (Staalplaat, 2001)
- A Love Affair in Paris (Space Time, 2002)
- A Day in the Life (Pony Canyon, 2006)

=== As sideman ===
- The Montgomery Brothers and Five Others (Pacific Jazz 1957)
- Wes Montgomery: Wes & Friends (Milestone, 1961)
- George Shearing with the Montgomery Brothers: George Shearing and the Montgomery Brothers (Jazzland, 1961)
- Roy Harte & Milt Holland - Perfect Percussion: The 44 Instruments of Roy Harte & Milt Holland, (World-Pacific Records, 1961)
- Johnny Griffin: Do Nothing 'til You Hear from Me (Riverside, 1963)
- Charlie Rouse: Epistrophy (Landmark, 1988)
- Bobby Hutcherson: Cruisin' the 'Bird (Landmark, 1988)
- David Fathead Newman: Blue Head (Candid, 1990) Live, with Clifford Jordan
