= Holiday in Brazil =

Studio album by Bud Shank
- Released: 1959
- Recorded: March 1958; Radio Recorders, Los Angeles, CA
- Genre: Jazz
- Label: World Pacific; WP 1259
- Producer: Richard Bock

Bud Shank chronology
Bud Shank in Africa (1958)	Holiday in Brazil (1959)	Latin Contrasts (1958)

Holiday in Brazil (also released as Brazilliance Vol. 2) is an album by saxophonist Bud Shank with arrangements by Laurindo Almeida released on the Pacific Jazz label.

== Reception ==
Professional ratings
Review scores
Source	Rating
AllMusic	3/5 stars

AllMusic rated the album with 3 stars.

== Track listing ==
All compositions by Laurindo Almeida, except as indicated.

1. "Simpatica" (Stanley Wilson) - 2:55
2. "Rio Rhapsody" (Laurindo Almeida, Radamés Gnattali) - 3:57
3. "Nocturno" 3:29
4. "Little Girl Blue" (Richard Rodgers, Lorenz Hart) - 2:37
5. "Choro in "A"" - 2:30
6. "Mood Antigua" (Bud Shank) - 4:02
7. "The Color of Her Hair" - 1:58
8. "Lonely" (Shank, Almeida) - 3:53
9. "I Didn't Know What Time It Was" (Rodgers, Hart) - 2:47
10. "Carioca Hills" - 3:01

== Personnel ==
- Bud Shank - alto saxophone, flute
- Laurindo Almeida - guitar
- Gary Peacock - bass
- Chuck Flores - drums
