= The Original Chico Hamilton Quintet =

Live album by Chico Hamilton Quintet
- Released: 1960
- Recorded: November 11, 1955
- Venues: The Strollers in Long Beach, CA
- Genre: Jazz
- Label: World Pacific WP-1287
- Producer: Richard Bock

Chico Hamilton chronology
Chico Hamilton Quintet featuring Buddy Collette (1955)	The Original Chico Hamilton Quintet (1960)	Chico Hamilton Quintet in Hi Fi (1956)

The Original Chico Hamilton Quintet is a live album by drummer and bandleader Chico Hamilton's Quintet featuring multi-instrumentalist Buddy Collette recorded in 1955 but not released on the World Pacific label until 1960.

== Reception ==
Professional ratings
Review scores
Source	Rating
Allmusic	3/5 stars
DownBeat	2.5/5 stars

Allmusic awarded the album 3 stars.

== Track listing ==
1. "Caravan" (Duke Ellington, Irving Mills, Juan Tizol) - 6:05
2. "Tea for Two" (Vincent Youmans, Irving Caesar) - 5:34
3. "Fast Flute" (Buddy Collette, Chico Hamilton) - 6:00
4. "Change It" (Collette) - 2:37
5. "Cute Little Deal" (Jo Jones) - 2:55
6. "A Mood" (Fred Katz) - 3:51
7. "This Is Your Day" (Collette) - 3:54
8. "I'll Keep Loving You" (Bud Powell) - 2:15
9. "Crazy Rhythm" (Roger Wolfe Kahn, Joseph Meyer, Irving Caesar) - 4:13

== Personnel ==
- Chico Hamilton - drums
- Buddy Collette - tenor saxophone, alto saxophone, flute, clarinet
- Fred Katz - cello
- Jim Hall - guitar
- Carson Smith - bass
