= The Modern Jazz Society Presents a Concert of Contemporary Music =

1956 studio album by John Lewis

Studio album by John Lewis
- Released: 1956
- Recorded: March 14, 1955; New York City
- Genre: Jazz
- Length: 43:08
- Label: Norgran; MGN 1040
- Producer: Norman Granz

John Lewis chronology
The Modern Jazz Society Presents a Concert of Contemporary Music (1956)	Grand Encounter (1956)

The Modern Jazz Society Presents a Concert of Contemporary Music is an album of music composed by John Lewis, arranged and conducted by Gunther Schuller, which was first released on the Norgran label.

== Reception ==
Professional ratings
Review scores
Source	Rating
AllMusic	3/5 stars
Penguin Guide to Jazz	👑

Allmusic awarded the album three stars out of five. The Penguin Guide to Jazz awarded the album a "Crown" of recommended jazz recordings.

== Track listing ==
All compositions by John Lewis

1. Midsömmer" - 9:57
2. "Little David's Fugue" - 5:33
3. "The Queen's Fancy" - 4:52
4. "Django" - 8:04
5. "Sun Dance" - 3:16

== Personnel ==
- John Lewis - supervisor, arranger
- Gunther Schuller - French horn, arranger, conductor
- J. J. Johnson - trombone
- Jim Poole - flute
- Manny Ziegler - bassoon
- Aaron Sachs (tracks 2, 4 & 5), Anthony Sciacca (tracks 1 & 3) - clarinet
- Stan Getz (tracks 1 & 3), Lucky Thompson (tracks 2, 4 & 5) - tenor saxophone
- Percy Heath - bass
- Connie Kay - drums
