= Latin Contrasts =

Studio album by Bud Shank
- Released: 1959
- Recorded: March 1958; Radio Recorders, Los Angeles, CA
- Genre: Jazz
- Label: World Pacific; WP 1281
- Producer: Richard Bock

Bud Shank chronology
| Holiday in Brazil (1958) | Latin Contrasts (1959) | I'll Take Romance (1958) |

Latin Contrasts (also released as Brazilliance Vol. 3) is an album by saxophonist Bud Shank with arrangements by Laurindo Almeida first released on the World Pacific label in 1959.

== Reception ==
Professional ratings
Review scores
| Source | Rating |
|---|---|
| AllMusic | 3/5 stars |

AllMusic rated the album with 3 stars.

== Track listing ==
All compositions by Laurindo Almeida, except as indicated.

1. "Harlem Samba" - 2:26
2. "North of the Border" - 2:38
3. "Sunset Baion" - 2:04
4. "'Round About Midnight" (Thelonious Monk, Bernie Hanighen, Cootie Williams) - 3:54
5. "Toro Dance" (Bud Shank) - 2:52
6. "Serenade for Alto" - 3:35
7. "Xana-Lyn" (Shank) - 3:28
8. "Blowing Wild" (Dmitri Tiomkin, Paul Francis Webster) - 3:30
9. "Gershwin Prelude" (George Gershwin) - 3:28
10. "Frio Y Color" (Shank) - 3:20

== Personnel ==
- Bud Shank - alto saxophone, flute
- Laurindo Almeida - guitar
- Gary Peacock - bass
- Chuck Flores - drums
