= Chico Hamilton Quintet in Hi Fi =

Studio album by Chico Hamilton Quintet
- Released: 1956
- Recorded: November 12, 1954, January 4 and February 10 & 13, 1956; Music Box Theatre in Los Angeles, CA
- Genre: Jazz
- Label: Pacific Jazz PJ-1216
- Producer: Richard Bock

Chico Hamilton chronology
| The Original Chico Hamilton Quintet (1955) | Chico Hamilton Quintet in Hi Fi (1956) | Chico Hamilton Trio (1956) |

Chico Hamilton Quintet in Hi Fi is an album by drummer and bandleader Chico Hamilton, released on the Pacific Jazz label. The bulk of album was recorded at two sessions in 1956; a live drum solo was recorded in 1954.

The cover artwork is a photo of artist Vito Paulekas.

== Reception ==
Professional ratings
Review scores
| Source | Rating |
|---|---|
| AllMusic | 3/5 stars |
| The Penguin Guide to Jazz Recordings | 3/4 stars |

The AllMusic site rated the album 3 stars.

== Track listing ==
1. "Jonalah" (Carson Smith) - 2:15
2. "Chrissie" (Jim Hall) - 3:50
3. "The Wind" (Russ Freeman) - 3:32
4. "Gone Lover (When Your Lover Has Gone)" (Einar Aaron Swan) - 3:48
5. "The Ghost" (Buddy Collette) - 5:05
6. "Sleepy Slept Here (Santa Monica)" (Collette) - 4:08
7. "Taking a Chance on Love" (Vernon Duke, John La Touche, Ted Fetter) - 4:07
8. "The Squimp" (Fred Katz) - 1:47
9. "Topsy" (Eddie Durham, Edgar Battle) - 4:43
10. "Drums West" (Chico Hamilton) - 4:15
11. "Sleep" (Adam Geibel, Earl Burtnett) - 2:26
- Recorded at Stockton High School in Stockton, CA on November 12, 1954 (track 10); in Los Angeles, CA on January 4, 1956 (tracks 1–5); and at the Music Box Theatre in Hollywood, CA on February 10 & 13, 1956 (tracks 6–9 & 11).
- Tracks 1, 3, 8, 11 also released on Pacific Jazz EP4-45.
- Track 10 is a 'drum solo feature' for Hamilton, edited from "A Bark For Barksdale" (original running time = 8:24) by the Gerry Mulligan Quartet.

== Personnel ==
- Chico Hamilton - drums
- Buddy Collette - tenor saxophone, alto saxophone, flute, clarinet (tracks 1–9 & 11)
- Fred Katz - cello (tracks 1–9 & 11)
- Jim Hall - guitar (tracks 1–9 & 11)
- Carson Smith - bass (tracks 1–9 & 11)
