= The King and I (The Mastersounds album) =

Studio album by The Mastersounds
- Released: 1957
- Recorded: September 19, 1957; Los Angeles, CA
- Genre: Jazz
- Label: World Pacific PJM 405
- Producer: Richard Bock

The Mastersounds chronology
Jazz Showcase (1957)	The King and I (1957)	Kismet (1958)

The King and I (subtitled A Jazz Interpretation by the Mastersounds) is an album by The Mastersounds led by vibraphonist Buddy Montgomery with pianist Richie Crabtree, bassist Monk Montgomery and drummer Benny Barth featuring performances of tunes from Richard Rodgers and Oscar Hammerstein II musical The King and I recorded in 1957 and released on the World Pacific label.

== Reception ==
Professional ratings
Review scores
Source	Rating
Allmusic	4/5 stars

The Allmusic review by Scott Yanow stated "The Mastersounds turn the music into jazz, but they keep the melodies in mind during their solos. The results are both respectful and swinging, well worth searching for by fans of the vibes quartet sound and the score of The King and I".

== Track listing ==
All compositions by Richard Rodgers and Oscar Hammerstein II

1. "Medley: I Have Dreamed/The Puzzlement/Something Wonderful" - 9:50
2. "Dance of the Siamese Children" - 4:08
3. "Getting to Know You" - 2:13
4. "My Lord and Master" - 4:07
5. "Medley: Hello, Young Lovers/Whistle a Happy Tune" - 3:29
6. "We Kiss in the Shadows" - 2:50
7. "Shall We Dance" - 4:10
8. "Epilogue" - 9:45

== Personnel ==
- Buddy Montgomery - vibraphone
- Richie Crabtree - piano
- Monk Montgomery - electric bass
- Benny Barth - drums
