= Bud Shank & the Sax Section =

Studio album by Bud Shank
- Released: 1966
- Recorded: December 1966
- Studio: Capitol (Hollywood)
- Genre: Jazz
- Label: Pacific Jazz; PJ 10110
- Producer: Richard Bock

Bud Shank chronology
Girl in Love (1966)	Bud Shank & the Sax Section (1966)	A Spoonful of Jazz (1967)

Bud Shank & the Sax Section is an album by saxophonist Bud Shank recorded in late 1966 for the Pacific Jazz label.

== Reception ==
Professional ratings
Review scores
Source	Rating
AllMusic	3/5 stars

AllMusic rated the album with 3 stars and in the review by Scott Yanow, he states: "overall, the music on this out-of-print LP is reasonably enjoyable within its limitations".

== Track listing ==
1. "Summer Samba (So Nice)" (Marcos Valle, Paulo Sérgio Valle, Norman Gimbel) - 3:05
2. "On a Clear Day (You Can See Forever)" (Alan Jay Lerner, Burton Lane) - 3:20
3. "Sidewinder" (Lee Morgan) - 2:47
4. "Summertime" (George Gershwin, DuBose Heyward) - 3:23
5. "And I Love Her" (John Lennon, Paul McCartney) - 3:12
6. "The Grass Is Greener" (Howlett Smith, Spence Maxwell) - 2:20
7. "Work Song" (Nat Adderley) - 2:50
8. "Reza" (Edu Lobo, Ruy Guerra) - 3:00
9. "Take Five" (Paul Desmond) - 2:20
10. "Here's That Rainy Day" (Jimmy Van Heusen, Johnny Burke) - 3:10
11. "A Time for Love" (Johnny Mandel, Paul Francis Webster) - 3:00
12. "Señor Blues" (Horace Silver) - 2:40

== Personnel ==
- Bud Shank - alto saxophone, soprano saxophone
- Bill Perkins - alto saxophone
- Bob Cooper, Bob Hardaway - tenor saxophone
- John Lowe, - bass saxophone
- Jack Nimitz - baritone saxophone
- Dennis Budimir - guitar
- Ray Brown - bass
- Larry Bunker - drums
- Unidentified orchestra arranged and conducted by Bob Florence
