= So Why Not? =

Studio album by Buddy Montgomery
- Released: 1988
- Recorded: July 28, 1988 and August 12, 1988
- Studio: Fantasy Studios, Berkeley, CA
- Genre: Jazz
- Length: 51:20
- Label: Landmark; LLP/LCD-1518
- Producer: Orrin Keepnews & Buddy Montgomery

Buddy Montgomery chronology
| Ties of Love (1987) | So Why Not? (1988) | Live at Maybeck Recital Hall, Volume Fifteen (1992) |

So Why Not? is an album by pianist Buddy Montgomery featuring performances recorded in 1985 and released on the Landmark label.

== Reception ==
Professional ratings
Review scores
| Source | Rating |
|---|---|
| Allmusic | 4.5/5 stars |

Scott Yanow at Allmusic noted "There is a lot of variety on this outing by Buddy Montgomery. ... All in all, this is a well-conceived and consistently intriguing straight-ahead outing by the underrated Buddy Montgomery".

== Track listing ==
All compositions by Buddy Montgomery except where noted

1. "So Why Not?" – 4:42
2. "Waterfall" – 7:58
3. "My Sentiments Exactly" – 5:26
4. "Summer Nights" – 5:07
5. "My Little Brown Book" (Billy Strayhorn) – 7:02
6. "Out of This World" (Harold Arlen, Johnny Mercer) – 5:54
7. "If Ever I Would Leave You" (Frederick Loewe, Alan Jay Lerner) – 4:23
8. "My Funny Valentine" (Richard Rodgers, Lorenz Hart) – 4:56
9. "Budini" – 5:52

== Personnel ==
- Buddy Montgomery – piano, vibraphone, synthesizer
- Warren Gale – trumpet (tracks 1 & 4)
- David "Fathead" Newman – tenor saxophone (tracks 1–4)
- Jim Nichols – guitar (tracks 1 & 3)
- Ron Carter – bass (tracks 5, 6 & 8)
- Jeff Chambers – bass, electric bass (tracks 1–4 & 7)
- Ralph Penland – drums
- Orestes Vilató – percussion (track 8)
- Willie Colón – congas (tracks 1–4 & 8)
