= Chico Hamilton Quintet =

Live album by Chico Hamilton Quintet
- Released: 1957
- Recorded: October 21 & 24, 1956; The Forum Theatre in Los Angeles, CA
- Genre: Jazz
- Label: Pacific Jazz PJ-1225
- Producer: Richard Bock

Chico Hamilton chronology
| Chico Hamilton Trio (1956) | Chico Hamilton Quintet (1957) | Sweet Smell of Success (1957) |

Chico Hamilton Quintet is a live album by drummer and bandleader Chico Hamilton, released on the Pacific Jazz label.

== Reception ==
Professional ratings
Review scores
| Source | Rating |
|---|---|
| AllMusic | 3/5 stars |

AllMusic rated the album 3 stars.

== Track listing ==
1. "I Know (Theme)" (Jim Hall) - 0:55
2. "Chanel #5" (Carson Smith) - 4:36
3. "Beanstalk" (Smith) - 5:13
4. "September Song" (Kurt Weill, Maxwell Anderson) - 3:32
5. "Siete-Cuartro" (Hall) - 4:51
6. "Mr. Jo Jones" (Chico Hamilton) - 3:11
7. "I Know (Theme)" (Hall) - 0:34
8. "Satin Doll" (Duke Ellington) - 4:35
9. "Lillian" (Freddy Catts) - 4:54
10. "Reflections" (Fred Katz) - 5:20
11. "Soft Winds" (Benny Goodman) - 4:48
12. "Caravan" (Duke Ellington, Irving Mills, Juan Tizol) - 3:20
13. "I Know (Theme)" (Hall) - 0:34

== Personnel ==
- Chico Hamilton - drums
- Paul Horn - tenor saxophone, alto saxophone, flute, clarinet
- Fred Katz - cello
- John Pisano - guitar
- Carson Smith - bass
