= Laurindo Almeida Quartet Featuring Bud Shank =

Studio album by Laurindo Almeida Quartet Featuring Bud Shank
- Released: 1955
- Recorded: September, 1953 and April 22, 1954
- Studio: Los Angeles
- Genre: Jazz
- Label: Pacific Jazz
- Producer: Richard Bock

Laurindo Almeida Quartet Featuring Bud Shank chronology
Laurindo Almeida Quartet Featuring Bud Shank (1955)	Guitar Music of Spain (1954)

Laurindo Almeida Quartet Featuring Bud Shank (later released as Brazilliance) is an album by guitarist Laurindo Almeida with saxophonist Bud Shank that was recorded in 1953 and 1954 for the Pacific Jazz label.

== Reception ==
Professional ratings
Review scores
Source	Rating
Allmusic	3/5 stars

Allmusic gave the album three stars.

== Track listing ==
No.	Title	Length
1.	"Atãbaque" (Radamés Gnattali)	2:46
2.	"Amor Flamenco" (Almeida)	2:13
3.	"Stairway to the Stars" (Matty Malneck, Frank Signorelli, Mitchell Parish)	2:57
4.	"Acercate Mas" (Osvaldo Farrés)	2:59
5.	"Terra Sêca" (Ary Barroso)	3:06
6.	"Speak Low" (Kurt Weill, Ogden Nash)	2:01
7.	"Inquietacao" (Barroso)	2:59
8.	"Baa-Too-Kee" (Jairo Varela, Almeida)	2:59
9.	"Cariñoso" (Pixinguinha)	3:35
10.	"Tocata" (Gnattali)	4:42
11.	"Hazardous" (Richard Hazard)	2:45
12.	"Nonô" (Peixoto)	2:56
13.	"Noctambulism" (Harry Babasin)	4:45
14.	"Blue Baião" (Humberto Teixeira, Luiz Gonzaga)	3:09

== Personnel ==
- Laurindo Almeida – guitar
- Bud Shank – alto saxophone
- Harry Babasin – double bass
- Roy Harte – drums
