= Hoagy Sings Carmichael =

Studio album by Hoagy Carmichael with the Pacific Jazzmen
- Released: 1957
- Recorded: September 10, 11 & 13, 1956; Forum Theatre, Los Angeles, CA
- Genre: Jazz
- Length: 38:41
- Label: Pacific Jazz PJ-1223
- Producer: Richard Bock

Hoagy Sings Carmichael (subtitled With the Pacific Jazzmen arranged and conducted by Johnny Mandel) is an album by composer and vocalist Hoagy Carmichael recorded in 1956 and released on the Pacific Jazz label. The album features Carmichael's last significant recordings.

== Reception ==
Professional ratings
Review scores
Source	Rating
Allmusic	4.5/5 stars
Disc	4/5 stars

The Allmusic review by Scott Yanow states: "What is unusual is that he is accompanied by an 11-piece all-star jazz group and that his voice takes its turn with trumpeters Harry "Sweets" Edison and Don Fagerquist, altoist Art Pepper, and pianist Jimmy Rowles. The match up works quite well, for Hoagy's songs have long been viable devices for jazz improvising".

== Track listing ==
All compositions by Hoagy Carmichael except as indicated

1. "Georgia on My Mind" (Hoagy Carmichael, Stuart Gorrell) – 3:58
2. "Winter Moon" – 4:12
3. "New Orleans" – 3:55
4. "Memphis in June" (Carmichael, Paul Francis Webster) – 3:48
5. "Skylark" (Carmichael, Johnny Mercer) – 4:03
6. "Two Sleepy People" (Carmichael, Frank Loesser) – 4:35
7. "Baltimore Oriole" (Carmichael, Webster) – 3:54
8. "Rockin' Chair" – 2:34
9. "Ballad in Blue" (Carmichael, Irving Kahal) – 3:07
10. "Lazy River" (Carmichael, Sidney Arodin) – 2:48
11. "Georgia on My Mind" (Carmichael, Gorrell) – 1:47 Bonus track on CD reissue
- Recorded at the Forum Theatre in Los Angeles, CA on September 10 (tracks 1, 3, 7 & 11), September 11 (tracks 4, 6 & 10) and September 13 (tracks 2, 5, 8 & 9), 1956

== Personnel ==
- Hoagy Carmichael – vocals
- Harry Edison (tracks 1, 3, 4, 6, 7, 10 & 11), Conrad Gozzo (tracks 1, 3, 4, 6, 7, 10 & 11), Don Fagerquist (tracks 2, 5, 8 & 9), Ray Linn (tracks 5, 9) – trumpet
- Jimmy Zito – bass trumpet
- Harry Klee – flute
- Art Pepper – alto saxophone
- Mort Friedman – tenor saxophone
- Marty Berman – baritone saxophone
- Jimmy Rowles – piano
- Al Hendrickson – guitar
- Joe Mondragon (tracks 1–3, 5, 7–9 & 11), Ralph Pena (tracks 4, 6 & 10) – bass
- Irving Cottler (tracks 1, 3, 4, 6, 7, 10 & 11), Nick Fatool (tracks 2, 5, 8 & 9) – drums
- Johnny Mandel – arranger, conductor
