= A Spoonful of Jazz =

Studio album by Bud Shank
- Released: August 1967
- Genre: Jazz
- Length: 33:43
- Label: World Pacific
- Producer: Ted Daryll

Bud Shank chronology
Bud Shank & the Sax Section (1966)	A Spoonful of Jazz (1967)	Bud Shank Plays Music from Today's Movies (1967)

A Spoonful of Jazz is an album by the saxophonist Bud Shank, released in August 1967 on the World Pacific label. The album features interpretations of tunes associated with the Lovin' Spoonful.

== Reception ==
Professional ratings
Review scores
Source	Rating
AllMusic	1/5 stars

The AllMusic review by Ken Dryden awarded the album 1 star and said that: "This historical curiosity shows how desperate labels like World Pacific sought to attract some of the pop audience to jazz artists; it can be safely bypassed by all jazz fans, except for the most obsessive collectors of the music of Bud Shank".

== Track listing ==
All tracks are written by John Sebastian, except where noted.

Side one

1. "Summer in the City" (J. Sebastian, Mark Sebastian, Steve Boone) – 2:58
2. "Did You Ever Have to Make Up Your Mind?" – 2:21
3. "(You and Me and) Rain on the Roof" – 2:25
4. "Amy's Theme" – 3:36
5. "Cocoanut Grove" (J. Sebastian, Zal Yanovsky) – 2:43
6. "Lovin' You" – 2:27

Side two

1. "Darling Be Home Soon" – 3:34
2. "Six O'Clock" – 2:30
3. "Younger Girl" – 2:41
4. "Didn't Wanna Have to Do It" – 3:08
5. "Daydream" – 3:12
6. 'Do You Believe in Magic" – 2:06

== Personnel ==
- Bud Shank – alto saxophone, flute
- Shorty Rogers – conductor, arranger
- Hal Blaine – drums
- Earl Palmer – drums
- Carol Kaye – bass
- Dennis Budimir – guitar
