= Grand Encounter =

Studio album by John Lewis
- Released: November 1956
- Recorded: February 10, 1956; Los Angeles, CA
- Genre: Jazz
- Length: 34:41
- Label: Pacific Jazz; PJ-1217
- Producer: Richard Bock

John Lewis chronology
The Modern Jazz Society Presents a Concert of Contemporary Music (1956)	Grand Encounter (1956)	Afternoon in Paris (1957)

Grand Encounter (subtitled 2° East / 3° West) is an album by pianist and composer John Lewis with saxophonist Bill Perkins, guitarist Jim Hall, bassist Percy Heath and drummer Chico Hamilton recorded for the Pacific Jazz label in 1956. The subtitle refers to the groups mix of East Coast (Lewis, Hall and Heath) and West Coast (Perkins and Hamiton) musicians.

== Reception ==
Professional ratings
Review scores
Source	Rating
Allmusic	5/5 stars

The Allmusic review by Scott Yanow stated: "this classic session is the ultimate in cool jazz".

== Track listing ==
1. "Love Me or Leave Me" (Walter Donaldson, Gus Kahn) - 8:18
2. "I Can't Get Started" (Vernon Duke, Ira Gershwin) - 3:31
3. "Easy Living" (Ralph Rainger, Leo Robin) - 4:13
4. "Two Degrees East - Three Degrees West" (John Lewis) - 6:07
5. "Skylark" (Hoagy Carmichael, Johnny Mercer) - 3:06
6. "Almost Like Being in Love" (Frederick Loewe, Alan Jay Lerner) - 9:26

== Personnel ==
- John Lewis - piano
- Bill Perkins - tenor saxophone
- Jim Hall - guitar
- Percy Heath - bass
- Chico Hamilton - drums
