= Girl in Love =

Studio album by Bud Shank
- Released: 1966
- Recorded: 1966; Los Angeles, CA
- Genre: Jazz
- Label: World Pacific; WP 1856
- Producer: Richard Bock

Bud Shank chronology
Michelle (1966)	Girl in Love (1966)	Bud Shank & the Sax Section (1966)

Girl in Love is an album by saxophonist Bud Shank recorded in 1966 for the World Pacific label.

== Reception ==
Professional ratings
Review scores
Source	Rating
AllMusic	2/5 stars

AllMusic rated the album with 2 stars.

== Track listing ==
1. "Lady Jane" (Mick Jagger, Keith Richards) - 3:05
2. "Summer Wind" (Heinz Meier, Hans Bradtke, Johnny Mercer) - 2:25
3. "The Sun Ain't Gonna Shine (Anymore)" (Bob Crewe, Bob Gaudio) - 2:29
4. "Strangers in the Night" (Bert Kaempfert, Charles Singleton, Eddie Snyder) - 2:40
5. "When a Man Loves a Woman" (Andrew Wright, Calvin Lewis) - 2:23
6. "Girl in Love" (Chet Kelley, Tom King) - 2:35
7. "Don't Go Breaking My Heart" (Burt Bacharach, Hal David) - 2:35
8. "Everybody Loves Somebody Sometime" (Irving Taylor, Ken Lane) - 2:40
9. "Time" (Michael Merchant) - 3:16
10. "The Shining Sea" (Johnny Mandel, Peggy Lee) - 2:38
11. "Lara's Theme" (Maurice Jarre) - 2:08
12. "Solitary Man" (Neil Diamond) - 2:58

== Personnel ==
- Bud Shank - alto saxophone
- Frank Rosolino - trombone
- Bob Florence - piano
- Dennis Budimir, Herb Ellis, John Pisano - guitar
- Bob West - bass
- Frank Capp - drums
- Victor Feldman - percussion
- Unidentified string section arranged and conducted by Oliver Nelson
