= Ballads & Blues (The Mastersounds album) =

Studio album by The Mastersounds
- Released: 1959
- Recorded: January 7, 1959; Los Angeles, CA
- Genre: Jazz
- Label: World Pacific PJ 1260
- Producer: Richard Bock

The Mastersounds chronology
Flower Drum Song (1958)	Ballads & Blues (1959)	The Mastersounds in Concert (1959)

Ballads & Blues is an album by The Mastersounds led by vibraphonist Buddy Montgomery with pianist Richie Crabtree, bassist Monk Montgomery and drummer Benny Barth featuring performances recorded in early 1959 and released on the World Pacific label.

== Reception ==
Professional ratings
Review scores
Source	Rating
Allmusic	4/5 stars

The Allmusic review by Scott Yanow stated "The music is quite accessible, if now difficult to find".

== Track listing ==
1. "Blues Medley: Bluesology/Purple Sounds/Fontessa" (Milt Jackson/Dizzy Gillespie/John Lewis) - 6:49
2. "Heidi" (Richie Crabtree) - 3:17
3. "Little Stevie (Monk Montgomery) - 6:52
4. "Solar" (Miles Davis) - 4:05
5. "How Deep Is the Ocean?" (Irving Berlin) - 4:27
6. "Monk's Ballad" (Monk Montgomery) - 4:01
7. "Mint Julep" (Rudy Toombs) - 5:45
8. "The Champ" (Gillespie) - 4:01

== Personnel ==
- Buddy Montgomery - vibraphone
- Richie Crabtree - piano
- Monk Montgomery - Fender electric bass
- Benny Barth - drums
