= Aren't You Glad You're You? =

1945 song

"Aren’t You Glad You’re You?" is a 1945 popular standard composed by Jimmy Van Heusen, with lyrics by Johnny Burke. Van Heusen and Burke wrote the song for the film The Bells of St. Mary's, directed by Leo McCarey, and starring Bing Crosby and Ingrid Bergman in the main roles. Bing Crosby presents the song in the film.

"Aren't You Glad You Are You?" received an Academy Award nomination in the Best Song category in 1946 but lost out to "It Might As Well Be Spring".

Bing Crosby's recording of the song on September 10, 1945 for Decca Records reached No.8 in the Billboard charts.

The song was quickly covered by The Pied Pipers (Capitol 225), Les Brown (with the band vocalist Doris Day, Columbia 36875) and Tommy Dorsey (RCA Victor 20-1728). who all reached the Billboard charts with their versions.

It was subsequently covered by George Olsen (Majestic), Peggy Lee, Gerry Mulligan and Chet Baker (on Gerry Mulligan Quartet Volume 1), Barbara Lea (1957), Shari Lewis (Hi Kids, 1959), June Christy (1960), Rosemary Clooney (1961), Joe Williams (1961), Mel Tormé and George Shearing (Concord Jazz CCD-4471), Tiny Tim (For All My Little Friends, 1969), Michael Feinstein (Pure Imagination, 1992), Rebecca Kilgore (The Music of Jimmy Van Heusen, 2005), and John McNeil & Bill McHenry Quartet (for their album Chill Morn He Climb Jenny 2010).
