= Ties of Love =

Studio album by Buddy Montgomery
- Released: 1987
- Recorded: November 4, 1986, November 24, 1986, and December 1986
- Studio: Van Gelder Studio, Englewood Cliffs, New Jersey; Mad Hatter Studios, Los Angeles, California; Fantasy Studios, Berkeley, California
- Genre: Jazz
- Length: 44:51
- Label: Landmark
- Producer: Orrin Keepnews

Buddy Montgomery chronology
Ties (1977)	Ties of Love (1987)	So Why Not? (1988)

Ties of Love is an album by the pianist Buddy Montgomery, released by Landmark in 1987. The album, which was Montgomery's first in a decade, was recorded partly in New York with longtime producer Orrin Keepnews.

== Reception ==
Professional ratings
Review scores
Source	Rating
AllMusic	4/5 stars

Scott Yanow of AllMusic noted: "By 1986, Buddy Montgomery had not recorded as a leader for many years, and because he is so well-respected, his first Landmark outing became quite an all-star affair. ... Despite all of the guests, the leader (who contributed five of the eight songs) does not get buried in the proceedings and holds his own with his friends." Fanfare singled out Claudio Roditi for praise, and called the album "a breezy session with some good, consistent music." Mark Stryker of Jazz Times commented: "Strong material, an infectious spirit, and bicoastal bands."

== Track listing ==
No.	Title	Writer(s)	Length
1.	"Muchismo"	Montgomery	6:56
2.	"Expressions in Blue"	Montgomery	6:59
3.	"Darrah"	Montgomery	5:23
4.	"All the Things You Are"	Jerome Kern, Oscar Hammerstein II	3:35
5.	"Ties"	Montgomery	5:45
6.	"Stablemates"	Benny Golson	4:54
7.	"Rose Marie"	Bernard Ighner	4:31
8.	"Soft Earth"	Montgomery	5:54

== Personnel ==
- Buddy Montgomery – piano, vibraphone, synthesized percussion
- Claudio Roditi – trumpet
- David "Fathead" Newman – tenor saxophone, flute
- Eddie Harris – tenor saxophone
- Ted Dunbar – guitar
- Ron Carter – double bass
- John Heard – double bass
- Marvin "Smitty" Smith – drums
- Billy Higgins – drums
- Warren Smith – percussion
- Steve Kroon – congas
- Marlena Shaw – vocals
