= Pacific Jazz Records =

American record label

- Parent company: Capitol Music Group (Universal Music Group)
- Founded: 1952; 74 years ago
- Founder: Richard Bock; Roy Harte
- Defunct: 1965; 61 years ago
- Status: Defunct
- Distributor: Blue Note Records (reissues)
- Genre: Jazz
- Country of origin: U.S.
- Location: Los Angeles

Pacific Jazz Records was an American record company and label based in Los Angeles, best known for cool jazz or West coast jazz. It was founded in 1952 by producer Richard Bock (1927–1988) and drummer Roy Harte (1924–2003). Harte, in 1954, also co-founded Nocturne Records with jazz bassist Harry Babasin (1921–1988).

Some of the musicians who recorded for Pacific Jazz included Chet Baker, Paul Desmond, Gerry Mulligan, Joe Pass, Gerald Wilson, the Jazz Crusaders, Don Ellis, Clare Fischer, Jim Hall, Groove Holmes, Les McCann, Wes Montgomery, and Art Pepper.

In 1957, Pacific Jazz Records changed its name to World Pacific Records to expand into a full-line label, with the Pacific Jazz imprint retained for jazz releases.

In 1958 Richard Bock and World Pacific were instrumental in introducing Indian traditional music to the West via Ravi Shankar, who also recorded for World Pacific.

Bock sold the label to Liberty Records in 1965, although he remained as an adviser until 1970. Liberty was merged into and discontinued by United Artists Records in 1971; UA in turn was bought by EMI in 1979. Mosaic reissued some Pacific Jazz material in the late 1980s, as did Blue Note when it gained control of the catalog in the 1990s.

Releases from Pacific Jazz Records are distributed digitally on streaming platforms through Universal Music Group.

== Partial discography ==
=== Pacific Jazz Ten Inch LP series ===
Pacific Jazz released 20 10-inch LPs between 1953 and 1954 before the label moved to 12-inch albums in 1955

Catalog No.	Artist	Album	Notes
PJLP 1	Gerry Mulligan	Gerry Mulligan Quartet	
PJLP 2	Lee Konitz and the Gerry Mulligan Quartet	Lee Konitz Plays with the Gerry Mulligan Quartet	
PJLP 3	Chet Baker	Chet Baker Quartet	
PJLP 4	Harry Edison	Sweets at the Haig	
PJLP 5	Gerry Mulligan	Gerry Mulligan Quartet	
PJLP 6	Chet Baker	Chet Baker Quartet featuring Russ Freeman	
PJLP 7	Laurindo Almeida	Laurindo Almeida Quartet Featuring Bud Shank	
PJLP 8	Russ Freeman	Russ Freeman Trio	
PJLP 9	Chet Baker	Chet Baker Ensemble	
PJLP 10	Lee Konitz and the Gerry Mulligan Quartet	Lee Konitz and the Gerry Mulligan Quartet	
PJLP 11	Chet Baker	Chet Baker Sings	
PJLP 12	Bob Gordon	Meet Mr. Gordon	
PJLP 13	Laurindo Almeida	Laurindo Almeida Quartet Featuring Bud Shank Volume 2	
PJLP 14	Bud Shank	Bud Shank and Three Trombones	
PJLP 15	Chet Baker	Chet Baker Sextet	
PJLP 16	Bob Brookmeyer Quartet featuring John Williams and Red Mitchell	Bob Brookmeyer Quartet	
PJLP 17	Chico Hamilton	Chico Hamilton Trio	
PJLP 18	Al Haig	Al Haig Trio	(not released)
PJLP 19	Clifford Brown	The Clifford Brown Ensemble Featuring Zoot Sims	
PJLP 20	Bud Shank and Bob Brookmeyer	Bud Shank and Bob Brookmeyer	

=== Pacific Jazz/World Pacific 1200 Twelve Inch LP Series ===
Commencing in 1955 a total of thirty-one 12 inch albums were released on the Pacific Jazz label before the name was changed to World Pacific.

Catalog No.	Artist	Album	Notes
PJ 1201	Gerry Mulligan	California Concerts	
PJ 1202	Chet Baker	Chet Baker Sings and Plays	with Bud Shank, Russ Freeman and Strings
PJ 1203	Chet Baker	Jazz at Ann Arbor	
PJ 1204	Laurindo Almeida	Laurindo Almeida Quartet Featuring Bud Shank	Reissue of PJLP 7 and PJLP 13
PJ 1205	Bud Shank with Shorty Rogers / Bud Shank with Bill Perkins	Bud Shank - Shorty Rogers - Bill Perkins	
PJ 1206	Chet Baker	The Trumpet Artistry of Chet Baker	
PJ 1207	Gerry Mulligan	The Original Gerry Mulligan Quartet	Selections from PJLP 1 and PJLP 5
PJ 1208	Jack Montrose	Jack Montrose Sextet	
PJ 1209	Chico Hamilton	Chico Hamilton Quintet featuring Buddy Collette	
PJ 1210	Gerry Mulligan	Paris Concert	
PJ 1211	Cy Touff	His Octet and Quintet	
PJ 1212	Russ Freeman and Richard Twardzik	Trio	
PJ 1213	Bud Shank	Strings & Trombones	Reissue of PJLP 14 and PJLP 20
PJ 1214	Bob Gordon Quartet / Clifford Brown Ensembles	Arranged by Montrose	Reissue of PJLP 12 and PJLP 19
PJ 1215	Bud Shank	The Bud Shank Quartet	
PJ 1216	Chico Hamilton	Chico Hamilton Quintet in Hi Fi	
PJ 1217	John Lewis	Grand Encounter	
PJ 1218	Chet Baker	Chet Baker in Europe	
PJ 1219	Bud Shank	Jazz at Cal-Tech	
PJ 1220	Chico Hamilton	Chico Hamilton Trio	Reissue of PJLP 17 with additional tracks
PJ 1221	Bill Perkins	The Bill Perkins Octet on Stage	
PJ 1222	Chet Baker	Chet Baker Sings	Reissue of PJLP 11 with additional tracks
PJ 1223	Hoagy Carmichael	Hoagy Sings Carmichael	
PJ 1224	Chet Baker	Chet Baker & Crew	
PJ 1225	Chico Hamilton	Chico Hamilton Quintet	
PJ 1226	Bud Shank and Bob Cooper	Flute 'n Oboe	
PJ 1227	Jim Hall	Jazz Guitar	
PJ 1228	Gerry Mulligan Quartet	Recorded in Boston at Storyville	
PJ 1229	Chet Baker	Chet Baker Big Band	
PJ 1230	Bud Shank	Bud Shank Quartet Featuring Claude Williamson	
PJ 1231	Fred Katz	Zen: The Music of Fred Katz	with Paul Horn and the Chico Hamilton Quartet
PJ 1232	Chet Baker	Quartet: Russ Freeman/Chet Baker	
Label name changes to "World Pacific"
PJ 1233	Bob Brookmeyer	Traditionalism Revisited	
PJ 1234	Chet Baker & Art Pepper	Playboys	
PJ 1235	Jack Lidström	Look, Dad! They're Comin' Down Our Street (in Hi-Fi)	
PJ 1236	Sidney Bechet & Martial Solal	Sidney Bechet Has Young Ideas	
PJ 1237	Gerry Mulligan and the Sax Section	The Gerry Mulligan Songbook Volume 1	
PJ 1238	Chico Hamilton	South Pacific in Hi-Fi	
PJ 1239	Bob Brookmeyer, Jim Hall & Jimmy Raney	The Street Swingers	
PJ 1240	The Montgomery Brothers	The Montgomery Brothers and Five Others	
PJ 1241	Gerry Mulligan Quartet and Chet Baker	Reunion with Chet Baker	
PJ 1242	Chico Hamilton	Chico Hamilton Trio Introducing Freddie Gambrell	
PJ 1243	The Mastersounds	Kismet	
PJ 1244	Various Artists	Jazz Canto: An Anthology of Poetry and Jazz Vol 1	
WP 1245	Charlie Mariano & Jerry Dodgion	Beauties Of 1918	
WP 1246	Gil Evans	New Bottle Old Wine	
WP 1247	Various Artists	Drums On Fire!	
WP 1248	Ravi Shankar	India's Master Musician	
WP 1249	Chet Baker	Pretty/Groovy	
WP 1250	David Allyn	Let's Face the Music and Dance	
WP 1251	Bud Shank with the Len Mercer Strings	I'll Take Romance	
WP 1252	The Mastersounds	Flower Drum Song	
WP 1253	Annie Ross and Gerry Mulligan	Annie Ross Sings a Song with Mulligan!	
WP 1254	Bud & Travis / Barbara Dane / Rolf Cahn / Lynn Gold	A Night at The Ash Grove	subtitled Saturday Night at the Coffeehouse
WP 1255	Gerald Heard	Reflections	
WP 1256	Freddie Gambrell	Freddie Gambrell	
WP 1257	Various Artists	The Sound of Big Band Jazz in Hi-Fi	
WP 1258	Chico Hamilton	Ellington Suite	
WP 1259	Bud Shank with Laurindo Almeida	Holiday in Brazil	
WP 1260	The Mastersounds	Ballads & Blues	
WP 1261	Various Artists	More Drums on Fire!	
WP 1262	Freddie Gambrell & Paul Horn	Mikado	
WP 1263	Buddy Bregman	Swingin' Standards	
WP 1264	Lambert, Hendricks & Ross	The Swingers!	
WP 1265	Bud Shank	Slippery When Wet	Original soundtrack
WP 1266	Paul Horn	Impressions!	
WP 1267	Jimmy Witherspoon	Singin' the Blues	
WP 1268	Gerald Heard	Indications: What Is Love?	
WP 1269	The Mastersounds	The Mastersounds in Concert	
WP 1270	Gil Evans	Great Jazz Standards	
WP 1271	The Mastersounds	Jazz Showcase	
WP 1272	The Mastersounds	The King and I	
WP 1273	Lee Konitz & Gerry Mulligan	Lee Konitz Plays with the Gerry Mulligan Quartet	Selections from PJLP 2 and PJLP 10 with additional tracks
WP 1274	Shorty Petterstein	The Wide Weird World of Shorty Petterstein: More Interviews of Our Time	Comedy
WP 1275	Art Blakey and the Jazz Messengers	Ritual	
WP 1276	Annie Ross	Gypsy	
WP 1277	Bud Shank and Bob Cooper	Blowin' Country	
WP 1278	Kimio Eto	Koto Music	
WP 1279	Lord Buckley	The Way Out Humor of Lord Buckley	
WP 1280	The Mastersounds	Happy Holidays from Many Lands	
WP 1281	Bud Shank	Latin Contrasts	
WP 1282	Sarita Heredia	Sarita & Co.	
WP 1283	Jon Hendricks	A Good Git-Together	
WP 1284	The Mastersounds	The Mastersounds Play Horace Silver	
WP 1285	Annie Ross	A Gasser!	
WP 1286	Bud Shank	Flute 'n Alto	Selections from PJ 1215 and PJ 1230
WP 1287	Chico Hamilton	The Original Chico Hamilton Quintet	
WP 1288	Joe Newman	Counting Five in Sweden	
WP 1289	Various Artists	Swingin' Like 60! Vol 1: The Singers / The Swingers	
WP 1290	Various Artists	Swingin' Like 60! Vol 2: Around the World	
WP 1291	Various Artists	Swingin' Like 60! Vol 3: Ballads and Blues	
WP 1292	Eddie Condon	Tiger Rag and All That Jazz	
WP 1293	Gloria Smyth	Like Soul!	
WP 1294	Sonny Terry & Brownie McGhee	Blues is a Story	
WP 1295	David Allen	David Allen Sings the Music of Jerome Kern	
WP 1296	Brownie McGhee, Lightnin' Hopkins, Big Joe Williams & Sonny Terry	Down South Summit Meetin'	
WP 1297	Don Randi	Feelin' Like Blues	
WP 1298	Cannonball Adderley & the Gil Evans Orchestra	New Bottle Old Wine	Reissue of PJ 1246
WP 1299	Kimio Eto & Bud Shank	Koto & Flute	

=== Mark Four Series ===
From 1956 to 1958 the Mark Four Series released twelve albums with the PJM prefix.

Catalog No.	Artist	Album	Notes
PJM 401	Bill Perkins, Richie Kamuca and Art Pepper	Just Friends	
PJM 402	The Jazz Messengers featuring Art Blakey	Ritual	
PJM 403	The Mastersounds	Jazz Showcase: Introducing The Mastersounds	
PJM 404	Chico Hamilton Quartet / Bud Shank-Bob Cooper Quintet / Stu Williamson Quartet / Russ Freeman Trio	Jazz Swings Broadway	
PJM 405	The Mastersounds	The King and I	
PJM 406	Lee Konitz and Gerry Mulligan	Lee Konitz Plays with the Gerry Mulligan Quartet	
PJM 407	Pepper Adams	Critics' Choice	
PJM 408	David Allen	A Sure Thing: David Allen Sings Jerome Kern	
PJM 409	Pat Healy	Just Before Dawn	
PJM 410	Cy Touff	Havin' a Ball	Reissue of PJ 1211
PJM 411	Bud Shank and Bob Cooper	The Swing's to TV	
PJM 412	Shorty Petterstein	The Wide Weird World of Shorty Petterstein	Comedy

=== Pacific Jazz 10000/20000 Series ===
In 1960 a new series of Pacific Jazz was launched with the PJ prefix with initial catalogue numbers increasing numerically for the first 91 releases before the 10000 numbering system was put into effect.

Catalog No.	Artist	Album	Notes
PJ 1	Lenny McBrowne	Lenny McBrowne and the 4 Souls	
PJ 2	Les McCann Ltd.	Les McCann Ltd. Plays the Truth	
PJ 3	Clifford Brown featuring Zoot Sims	Jazz Immortal	
PJ 4	Bud Shank	Bud Shank Plays Tenor	
PJ 5	Monk Montgomery, Wes Montgomery & Buddy Montgomery	Montgomeryland	
PJ 6	Teddy Edwards with Les McCann Ltd.	It's About Time	
PJ 7	Les McCann Ltd.	Les McCann Ltd. Plays the Shout	
PJ 8	Gerry Mulligan	The Genius of Gerry Mulligan	Recordings from sessions in the 1952–1954 period
PJ 9	Curtis Amy & Paul Bryant	The Blues Message	
PJ 10	The Modest Jazz Trio	Good Friday Blues	
PJ 11	Harry Edison	The Inventive Mr. Edison	Expanded version of Sweets at the Haig (PJLP 4)
PJ 12	Paul Bryant	Burnin'	
PJ 13	Various Artists	This Is the Blues Vol. 1	
PJ 14	Teddy Edwards	Sunset Eyes	
PJ 14	Art Blakey and The Jazz Messengers	Ritual	
PJ 16	Les McCann Ltd.	Les McCann Ltd. in San Francisco	
PJ 17	Wes Montgomery, Buddy Montgomery & Monk Montgomery	Wes, Buddy & Monk Montgomery	
PJ 18	Chet Baker, Art Pepper and Phil Urso	Picture of Heath	
PJ 19	Curtis Amy & Frank Butler	Groovin' Blue	
PJ 20	Zoot Sims	Choice	
PJ 21	Bud Shank	New Groove	
PJ 22	Red Mitchell	Rejoice!: Cello Debut at the Renaissance	
PJ 23	Richard "Groove" Holmes	"Groove"	
PJ 24	Larry Wrice	Wild!: The Big Big Sound of Larry "Wild" Wrice	
PJ 25	Les McCann Ltd.	Pretty Lady	
PJ 26	Curtis Amy & Paul Bryant	Meetin' Here	
PJ 27	The Jazz Crusaders	Freedom Sound	
PJ 28	Gil Evans and His Orchestra	America's #1 Arranger	Originally released as Great Jazz Standards on World Pacific in 1959
PJ 29	Carmell Jones	The Remarkable Carmell Jones	
PJ 30	Various Artists	This Is the Blues Vol. 2	
PJ 31	Les McCann	Les McCann Sings	
PJ 32	Gene Ammons & Richard Holmes	Groovin' with Jug	
PJ 33	Art Blakey and the Jazz Messengers / The Elmo Hope Quintet	Art Blakey & The Jazz Messengers / The Elmo Hope Quintet Featuring Harold Land	split album
PJ 34	Gerald Wilson Orchestra	You Better Believe It!	
PJ 35	Bud Shank featuring Carmell Jones and Bob Cooper	Barefoot Adventure	Original soundtrack
PJ 36	Ron Jefferson	Love Lifted Me	
PJ 37	Richard Twardzik	The Last Set	
PJ 38	Lee Konitz and Gerry Mulligan	Konitz Meets Mulligan	Selections from PJLP 2 and PJLP 10 with alternate takes added on
PJ 39	Chico Hamilton Quintet	Spectacular!	Originally released as Chico Hamilton Quintet in 1955
PJ 40	Gil Evans Orchestra featuring Cannonball Adderley	Gil Evans Orchestra Featuring Cannonball Adderley	Originally released as New Bottle Old Wine in 1958
PJ 41	Kenny Dorham & Jackie McLean	Inta Somethin'	
PJ 42	Cy Touff & Richie Kamuca	Keester Parade	Originally released as Cy Touff, His Octet & Quintet in 1956
PJ 43	The Jazz Crusaders	Lookin' Ahead	
PJ 44	John Lewis, Bill Perkins, Jim Hall, Percy Heath and Chico Hamilton	2° East, 3° West	Originally released as Grand Encounter in 1957
PJ 45	Les McCann Ltd.	Les McCann Ltd. in New York	
PJ 46	Curtis Amy featuring Victor Feldman	Way Down	
PJ 47	Gerry Mulligan Quartet	Reunion	Originally released in 1958
PJ 48	Arnold Ross, Joe Pass, Dave Allan, Greg Dykes, Ronald Clark, Bill Crawford and Candy Latson	Sounds of Synanon	
PJ 49	Tricky Lofton & Carmell Jones	Brass Bag	
PJ 50	Gerry Mulligan	California Concerts	Originally released in 1955
PJ 51	Richard "Groove" Holmes & Les McCann	Somethin' Special	
PJ 52	Clare Fischer	First Time Out	
PJ 53	Carmell Jones	Business Meetin'	
PJ 54	Bumble Bee Slim	Back in Town!	
PJ 55	Don Ellis	Essence	
PJ 56	Les McCann Ltd.	On Time	
PJ 57	The Jazz Crusaders	The Jazz Crusaders at the Lighthouse	
PJ 58	Bud Shank & Clare Fischer	Bossa Nova Jazz Samba	
PJ 59	Richard Holmes	After Hours	
PJ 60	Art Pepper	The Artistry of Pepper	
PJ 61	Gerald Wilson Orchestra	Moment of Truth	
PJ 62	Curtis Amy	Tippin' on Through	
PJ 63	Les McCann Ltd.	Les McCann Ltd. Plays the Shampoo	
PJ 64	Bud Shank, Clare Fischer and Joe Pass	Brasamba!	
PJ 65	Earl Anderza	Outa Sight	
PJ 66	Clifford Scott	Out Front	
PJ 67	Clare Fischer	Surging Ahead	
PJ 68	The Jazz Crusaders	Tough Talk	
PJ 69	Les McCann Ltd.	The Gospel Truth	
PJ 70	Curtis Amy & Dupree Bolton	Katanga!	
PJ 71	Sonny Stitt	My Mother's Eyes	
PJ 72	Charles Kynard	Where It's At!	
PJ 73	Joe Pass	Catch Me!	
PJ 74	Dick Grove Orchestra	Little Bird Suite	
PJ 75	Gerry Mulligan & Chet Baker	Timeless	Sessions from the mid-1950s
PJ 76	The Jazz Crusaders	Heat Wave	
PJ 77	Clare Fischer	Extension	
PJ 78	Les McCann	Soul Hits	
PJ 79	Jim Hall	Jim Hall	Reissue of 1957 album Jazz Guitar
PJ 80	Gerald Wilson Orchestra	Portraits	
PJ 81	Les McCann & The Jazz Crusaders	Jazz Waltz	
PJ 82	Roy Haynes	People	
PJ 83	The Jazz Crusaders	Stretchin' Out	
PJ 84	Les McCann	McCanna	
PJ 85	Joe Pass	For Django	
PJ 86	Monty Alexander	Alexander the Great	
PJ 87	The Jazz Crusaders	The Thing	
PJ 88	Gerald Wilson Orchestra	On Stage	
PJ 89	Bud Shank & João Donato	Bud Shank & His Brazilian Friends	
PJ 90	João Donato	Sambou Sambou	
PJ 91	Les McCann & The Gerald Wilson Orchestra	McCann/Wilson	
PJ 10092	The Jazz Crusaders	Chile Con Soul	
PJ 10093	Gil Fuller & Dizzy Gillespie	Gil Fuller & the Monterey Jazz Festival Orchestra featuring Dizzy Gillespie	
PJ 10094	Monty Alexander	Spunky	
PJ 10095	Albert Mangelsdorff	Now, Jazz Ramwong	
PJ 10096	Clare Fischer	Manteca!	
PJ 10097	Les McCann	Spanish Onions	
PJ 10098	The Jazz Crusaders	Live at the Lighthouse '66	
PJ 10099	Gerald Wilson Orchestra	Feelin' Kinda Blues	
PJ 10100	Various Artists	On Mike: A Decade of Pacific Jazz	
PJ 10101	Gil Fuller & James Moody	Night Flight	
PJ 10102	Gerry Mulligan	Paris Concert	
PJ 10103	Zimbo Trio	Zimbo Trio	
PJ 10104	Wes Montgomery	Easy Groove	Selections from PJ 5 and PJ 17
PJ 10105	Richard "Groove" Holmes	Tell It Like It Tis	
PJ 10106	The Jazz Crusaders	Talk That Talk	
PJ 10107	Les McCann	A Bag of Gold	
PJ 10108	Chico Hamilton	Jazz Milestones Series	Tracks recorded between 1956–1959
PJ 10109	Richard "Groove" Holmes	Jazz Milestones Series	Compilation of PJ 23, PJ 32, PJ 51, PJ 59, PJ 10105
PJ 10110	Bud Shank	Bud Shank & the Sax Section	
PJ 10111	Gerald Wilson Orchestra	The Golden Sword	
PJ 10112	Don Ellis Orchestra	Don Ellis Orchestra 'Live' at Monterey!	
PJ 10113	Buddy Rich	Swingin' New Big Band	
PJ 10114	Zimbo Trio	The Brazilian Sound: Restrained Excitement	
PJ 10115	The Jazz Crusaders	The Festival Album	
PJ 10116	The Jazz Corps	The Jazz Corps Under the Direction of Tommy Peltier featuring Roland Kirk	
PJ 10117	Buddy Rich	Big Swing Face	
PJ 10118	Gerald Wilson Orchestra	Live and Swinging	
PJ 10119	Booker Ervin	Structurally Sound	
PJ 10120	Les McCann	From the Top of the Barrel	
PJ 10121	Victor Feldman	Victor Feldman Plays Everything in Sight	
PJ 10122	Roger Kellaway	Spirit Feel	
PJ 10123	Don Ellis Orchestra	Live in 3 2/3 / 4 Time	
PJ 10124	The Jazz Crusaders	Uh Huh	
PJ 10125	Johnny Lytle	Done It Again	
PJ 10126	Buddy Rich	The New One!	
PJ 10127	Booker Ervin	Booker 'n' Brass	
PJ 10128	Victor Feldman	The Venezuela Joropo	
PJ 10129	Johnny Lytle	Swingin' at the Gate	
PJ 10130	The Mastersounds	Kismet	Reissue of PJ 1243
PJ 10131	The Jazz Crusaders	Lighthouse '68	
PJ 10132	Gerald Wilson Orchestra	Everywhere	
PJ 10133	Buddy Rich	Mercy, Mercy	
PJ 10134	Jean-Luc Ponty	More than Meets the Ear	
PJ 10135	Gerald Wilson Orchestra	California Soul	
PJ 20136	The Jazz Crusaders	Powerhouse	
PJ 20137	Wes Montgomery	A Portrait of Wes Montgomery	
PJ 20138	Chet Baker	Plays and Sings	
PJ 20139	Clifford Brown	Jazz Immortal	Reissue of PJ 3
PJ 20140	Gerry Mulligan	The Genius of Gerry Mulligan	Reissue of PJ 8
PJ 20142	Lee Konitz & Gerry Mulligan	Konitz Meets Mulligan	Reissue of PJ 38
PJ 20143	Chico Hamilton	Spectacular!	Reissue of PJ 1209
PJ 20144	John Lewis	2 Degrees East, 3 Degrees West	Reissue of PJ 1217
PJ 20145	Gerry Mulligan	California Concerts	Reissue of PJ 1201
PJ 20146	Gerry Mulligan & Chet Baker	Timeless	Reissue of PJ 75
PJ 20147	Richard "Groove" Holmes	Welcome Home	
PJ 20149	Various Artists	This Is the Blues Vol. 1	
PJ 20150	Various Artists	This Is the Blues Vol. 2	
PJ 20152	Wilton Felder	Bullitt	
PJ 20153	Richard "Groove" Holmes	Workin' on a Groovy Thing	
PJ 20154	Bobby Bryant	Earth Dance	
PJ 20155	Ernie Watts	Planet Love	
PJ 20156	Jean-Luc Ponty	Electric Connection	
PJ 20157	Bud Shank	Windmills of Your Mind	
PJ 20158	Buddy Rich Big Band	Buddy & Soul	
PJ 20159	Bobby Bryant	The Jazz Excursion Into Hair	
PJ 20160	Gerald Wilson Orchestra	Eternal Equinox	
PJ 20161	Wilbert Longmire	Revolution	
PJ 20162	Freddy Robinson	The Coming Atlantis	
PJ 20163	Richard "Groove" Holmes	X-77: Recorded Live at the Lighthouse	
PJ 20165	The Jazz Crusaders	Lighthouse '69	
PJ 20166	Les McCann with the Gerald Wilson Orchestra	More or Les McCann	Selections from Pretty Lady, Les McCann Sings, Les McCann Ltd. Plays the Shampoo, Spanish Onions and McCanna with additional orchestral overdubs
PJ 20167	Klaus Doldinger Quartet	Blues Happening	
PJ 20168	Jean-Luc Ponty with the George Duke Trio	The Jean-Luc Ponty Experience	
PJ 20169	Buddy Rich	The Best of Buddy Rich	
PJ 20170	Bud Shank with The Bob Alcivar Singers	Let It Be	
PJ 20171	Richard "Groove" Holmes and Ernie Watts	Come Together	
PJ 20172	Jean-Luc Ponty	King Kong: Jean-Luc Ponty Plays the Music of Frank Zappa	
PJ 20173	Les McCann Ltd.	New from the Big City	
PJ 20174	Gerald Wilson Orchestra	The Best of the Gerald Wilson Orchestra	
PJ 20175	The Jazz Crusaders	The Best of the Jazz Crusaders	
PJ 20176	Freddy Robinson	Hot Fun in the Summertime	

=== World Pacific 1400 Twelve Inch LP Series ===
Commencing in 1960 the World Pacific label began releasing a range of world music recordings on the 1400 Series.

Catalog No.	Artist	Album	Notes
WP-1401	Carl Reiner & Mel Brooks	2000 Years with Carl Reiner and Mel Brooks	
WP-1402	Jimmy Witherspoon	There's Good Rockin' Tonight!	
WP-1403	Chatur Lal	The Drums of India	
WP-1404	Bobby Montez	Viva! Montez	
WP-1405	Roy Harte & Milt Holland	Perfect Percussion: The 44 Instruments of Roy Harte and Milt Holland	
WP-1406	Kitty White	Intimate	
WP-1407	Bruce Spencer	The Best of Crazy Ads	
WP-1408	Al Viola	Guitar Lament	
WP-1409	Various Artists	Poetry and Jazz	
WP-1410	Ben Di Tosti	Carnival	
WP-1411	Bobby Montez	Pachanga Y Cha Cha Cha	
WP-1412	Laurindo Almeida	Brazilliance	Reissue of PJ 1204
WP-1413	Gerald Heard	Explorations Volume 2: Survival, Growth & Re-Birth	
WP-1414	Modesto's Charanga Kings Featuring Olguita	Pachanga, Anyone?	
WP-1415	Virginia Denison	Yoga for You	(not released)
WP-1416	Ravi Shankar	Improvisations	
WP-1417	Gerald Heard	Explorations / Reflections / Indications	
WP-1418	Sharan Rani	The Music of India	
WP-1419	Bud Shank	Brazilliance Vol. 2	Reissue of Holiday in Brazil
WP-1420	Maharishi Mahesh Yogi	Deep Meditation	
WP-1421	Ravi Shankar	India's Most Distinguished Musician in Concert	
WP-1422	Ravi Shankar	India's Master Musician	
WP-1423	Kimio Eto	Koto Music	
WP-1424	Kimio Eto Featuring Bud Shank	Koto & Flute	
WP-1425	Bud Shank	Brazilliance Vol. 3	Reissue of Latin Contrasts
WP-1426	Balachander	Magic Music of India	
WP-1427	Sarita Heredia	Flamenco Fire!: Sarita Heredia at the Matador	
WP-1428	Kimio Eto	Koto Master	
WP-1430	Ravi Shankar	India's Master Musician/Recorded in London	
WP-1431	Ravi Shankar	Ragas & Talas	
WP-1432	Ravi Shankar	Portrait of Genius	
WP-1433	Ali Akbar Khan	North Indian Master of the Sarod	
WP-1434	Ravi Shankar	Sound of the Sitar	
WP-1435	Ali Akbar Khan	Sound of the Sarod	
WP-1436	Balachander	Sounds of the Veena	
WP-1437	Various Artists	Drums of North and South India	
WP-1438	Ravi Shankar	Three Ragas	
WP-1439	Kimio Eto	Sound of the Koto	
WP-1440	Subbulakshmi	The Sounds of Subbulakshmi: India's Greatest Singer	
WP-1441	Ravi Shankar	Ravi Shankar in New York	
WP-1442	Ravi Shankar	Live: Ravi Shankar at the Monterey International Pop Festival	
WP-1443	Kinichi Nakanoshima	The Music of Kinichi Nakanoshima: Koto and Flute	
WP-1444	Ashish Khan	Young Master of the Sarod	
WP-1445	Paul Horn	Paul Horn in Kashmir: Cosmic Consciousness	
WP-1446	Maharishi Mahesh Yogi	The Master Speaks	
WP-1447	Paul Horn	Paul Horn in India: Ragas for Flute, Veena and Violin	
WP-1449	Ravi Shankar	Ravi Shankar in San Francisco	
WP-1450	K. V. Narayanaswamy	The Voice of K. V. Narayanswamy: Carnatic Music: Music of South India	
WPS-21451	T. Viswanathan	South Indian Flute	
WPS-21452	Brij Bhushan Kabra	Two Raga Moods on Guitar	
WPS-21453	Buddy Rich and Alla Rakha	Rich à la Rakha	
WPS-21454	Ravi Shankar	Charly	(Soundtrack)
WPS-21455	Maharishi Mahesh Yogi	The Seven States of Consciousness	
WPS-21456	Ramani	The Soul of Indian Flute	
WPS-21457	Balachander	Man from Madras	
WPS-21458	Alla Rakha	Tabla!	
WPS-21459	Ashish Khan	California Concert	
WPS-21461	Lakshmi Shankar	The Voice of Lakshmi Shankar	
WPS-21463	Subbulakshmi	Subbulakshmi in Concert from Her American Tour	
WPS-21464	Ravi Shankar	A Morning Raga / An Evening Raga	
WPS-21465	Satya Sai Baba	Satya Sai Baba Chants the Bajans	
WPS-21466	Ashish Khan with Narration by Ravi Shankar	Song of God: Bagavad Gita	
WPS-21467	Ravi Shankar	Ravi Shankar at the Woodstock Festival	

=== World Pacific 1800 Twelve Inch LP Series ===
From 1962 until 1970 the World Pacific label released a range of popular music recordings on their 1800 Series.

Catalog No.	Artist	Album	Notes
WP-1801	Olguita with the Big Band Sound of George Hernandez	Latinsville!	
WP-1802	Modesto's Charanga Kings featuring Olguita	Pachanga, Anyone?	
WP-1803	Bobby Montez	Viva! Montez	
WP-1804	Bobby Montez	Pachanga Y Cha Cha Cha	
WP-1805	Hugh Romney	Third Stream Humour	
WP-1806	The Goldcoast Singers	Here They Are!	
WP-1807	Victor Feldman	Stop the World I Want to Get Off	
WP-1808	Annie Ross	Gypsy	
WP-1809	Bud Herrmann	Grand Style	
WP-1810	The De-Fenders	The De-Fenders Play the Big Ones	
WP-1811	Clifford Scott	Clifford Scott Plays the Big Ones	
WP-1812	The Folkswingers	12 String Guitar!	
WP-1813	Various Artists	Hootenanny Saturday Nite!	
WP-1814	The Folkswingers	12 String Guitar! Vol. 2	
WP-1815	Lord Buckley	Lord Buckley in Concert	
WP-1816	Tut Taylor and The Folkswingers with 12 String Guitar	12 String Dobro!	
WP-1817	Lightnin' Hopkins with Brownie McGhee, Sonny Terry and Big Joe Williams	First Meetin'	
WP-1818	The Sandells	Scrambler!	
WP-1819	Bud Shank and The Folkswingers	Folk 'n Flute	
WP-1820	Long Gone Miles	Country Born	
WP-1821	The Kentucky Colonels with Roland White and Clarence White	Appalachian Swing!	
WP-1822	Joe Pass and The Folkswingers	12 String Guitar!: Great Motion Picture Themes	
WP-1823	Charles Kynard and Buddy Collette	Warm Winds	
WP-1824	David Parker	Balalaika!	
WP-1825	Clifford Scott	Lavender Sax	
WP-1826	Chet Baker	Chet Baker Sings	
WP-1827	Bud Shank/Bob Cooper Orchestra	Flute, Oboe and Strings	
WP-1828	The Stoneman Family	Big Ball in Monterey: Live!	
WP-1829	Tut Taylor/Roland and Clarence White	Dobro Country	
WP-1830	Clare Fischer	So Danco Samba	
WP-1831	The Mastersounds	The King and I	Reissue of PJM-405
WP-1832	The Sandals	The Endless Summer	(Soundtrack)
WP-1833	The Bandits	The Electric 12	
WP-1834	John Barbour	It's Tough To Be White...	The Wit of John Barbour
WP-1835	Glenn Campbell	Mr. 12 String Guitar	
WP-1836	Larry Nelson	The "In" Harmonica	
WP-1837	Billy Larkin and the Delegates	Hole in the Wall	
WP-1838	The Carmel Strings Featuring Larry Knechtel	Boss Baroque	
WP-1839	The Mariachi Brass Featuring Chet Baker	A Taste of Tequila	
WP-1840	Bud Shank	Michelle	
WP-1841	Bob Lind	Don't Be Concerned	
WP-1842	The Mariachi Brass Featuring Chet Baker	Hats Off	
WP-1843	Billy Larkin and the Delegates	Ain't That a Groove!	
WP-1844	Joe Pass	A Sign of the Times	
WP-1845	Bud Shank	California Dreamin'	
WP-1846	The Folkswingers Featuring Harihar Rao on Sitar	Raga Rock	
WP-1847	Chet Baker and the Carmel Strings	Quietly There	
WP-1849	Lord Buckley	Blowing His Mind (and Yours, Too)	
WP-1850	Billy Larkin and the Delegates	Hold On!	
WP-1851	Bob Lind	Photographs of Feeling	
WP-1852	The Mariachi Brass Featuring Chet Baker	Double-Shot	
WP-1853	Bud Shank	Girl in Love	
WP-1854	Joe Pass	The Stones Jazz	
WP-1855	Bud Shank	Brazil! Brazil! Brazil!	Selections from Holiday in Brazil, Brasamba!, Bud Shank & His Brazilian Friends and Bud Shank & the Sax Section
WP-1856	Walter Wanderley	Samba So!	
WP-1857	Joe Torres	Latino Con Soul	
WP-1858	Chet Baker and the Carmel Strings	Into My Life	
WP-1859	The Mariachi Brass Featuring Chet Baker	In The Mood	
WP-1860	Bob Florence	Pet Project	The Bob Florence Big Band Plays Petula Clark Hits
WP-1861	Roger Kellaway	Stride!	
WP-1862	Ken & Beverly	Watch What Happens!	
WP-1863	Billy Larkin and the Delegates	Don't Stop!	
WP-1864	Bud Shank	Bud Shank Plays Music from Today's Movies	
WP-1865	Joe Pass	Simplicity	
WP-1866	Walter Wanderley	Quarteto Bossamba	
WP-1867	The Hard Times {{{last}}}	Blew Mind	
WP-1868	Bud Shank	A Spoonful of Jazz	
WP-1870	The Marketts	Sun Power	
WP-1873	Bud Shank	Magical Mystery	
WPS-21874	Billy Larkin and the Delegates	Dr. Feelgood	
WPS-21875	Kali Bahlu	Kali Bahlu Takes the Forest Children on a Journey of Cosmic Remembrance	
WPS-21876	Terry Bêr	Through the Eyes Of Terry Ber	
WPS-21879	Lord Buckley	Buckley's Best	
WPS-21880	Craig Hundley Trio	Arrival of a Young Giant	
WPS-21881	J.P. Rags	Scruffety	
WPS-21882	Harper and Rowe	Harper and Rowe	
WPS-21883	Billy Larkin and the Delegates	The Best of Billy Larkin and the Delegates	Guest Artist Clifford Scott
WPS-21884	The Sandals	The Last of the Ski Bums	(Soundtrack)
WPS-21886	Shakey Jake and the All Stars	Further On Up the Road	
WPS-21887	George Smith and the Chicago Blues Band	Blues with a Feeling: A Tribute to Little Walter	
WPS-21888	Roy Harper	Folkjokeopus	
WPS-21889	Lord Buckley	Bad Rapping of the Marquis de Sade	
WPS-21890	Sunnyland Slim	Slim's Got His Thing Goin' On	
WPS-21891	Billy Larkin	I Got the Feelin'	
WPS-21892	The Groundhogs	Scratching the Surface	
WPS-21893	L. C. "Good Rockin'" Robinson/Lafayette "Thing" Thomas/Dave Alexander	Oakland Blues	
WPS-21894	The Carnival	The Carnival	
WPS-21895	Peter Sarstedt	Where Do You Go to My Lovely	(not released?)
WPS-21896	Craig Hundley	Craig Hundley Plays With the Big Boys	
WPS-21897	Big Joe Williams	Hand Me Down My Old Walking Stick	
WPS-21898	Various Artists	Bluegrass Special	
WPS-21899	Peter Sarstedt	As Though It Were a Movie	
WPS-21900	Craig Hundley	Rhapsody in Blue	

== See also ==
- List of record labels
