= Roy Harte =

American drummer

- Birth name: Roy S. Hartstein
- Born: May 27, 1924; New York City; United States
- Died: October 26, 2003 (aged 79); Burbank, California; United States
- Genres: Swing music, big band, cool jazz
- Occupation(s): Musician, bandleader, music executive
- Instrument(s): Drums, percussion
- Years active: 1943–2003
- Labels: Decca; Nocturne; V-Disc; Pacific Jazz

Roy S. Harte (May 27, 1924 – October 26, 2003) was an American jazz drummer and co-founder of Nocturne Records and Pacific Jazz Records. In partnership with Remo Belli, the founder and namesake of internationally famous drumhead manufacturer Remo, he founded "Drum City," a well-known retail drum shop on Santa Monica Boulevard in West Hollywood, California. Harte appeared in Leedy drums endorsement ads in the late 1950s to early 1960s.

== Selected discography ==
=== As leader ===
- Perfect Percussion: The 44 Instruments of Roy Harte & Milt Holland (World-Pacific Records, 1961)

=== As sideman ===
- Bobby Sherwood
- Billie Rogers
- George Paxton
- Ike Carpenter
- Vido Musso
- Ziggy Elman
- Dave Pell
- Les Brown
- Nappy Lamare
- Shorty Rogers
- Herb Geller
- Laurindo Almeida - Laurindo Almeida Quartet Featuring Bud Shank (Pacific Jazz, 1953-1954)
- Steve White
- Herbie Harper
- Bud Shank - Bud Shank - Shorty Rogers - Bill Perkins (Pacific Jazz, 1955)
- Bob Enevoldsen
- Harry Babasin
- Peggy Connelly
- The Nash Brothers (Dick & Ted)
- Murray McEachern
- The Mastersounds
- Earl Grant
- Percussion Unabridged
- Frank Capp
- Del Bennett
- Jackie Kelso
- Jimmy Wyble
- John Banister
- Arnold Ross

With others

- Frankie Avalon, ...And Now About Mr. Avalon (Chancellor, 1961)
- Pat Boone, Great! Great! Great! (Dot, 1961)
- Peggy Lee, Jump for Joy (Capitol, 1959)
- Randy Newman, 12 Songs (Reprise, 1970)
