= Joe Mondragon =

American jazz musician (1920–1987)

- Born: February 2, 1920; Antonito, Colorado, U.S.
- Origin: Española, New Mexico, U.S.
- Died: July 1987 (aged 67) San Juan Pueblo, New Mexico, U.S.
- Genres: Jazz
- Instrument: Double bass

Joe Mondragon (February 2, 1920 – July 1987) was an American jazz bassist.

== Early life ==
Mondragon was born in Antonito, Colorado, and raised in the Española Valley region of New Mexico. Mondragon was of Apache and Hispanic origin.

== Career ==
Mondragon was an autodidact on bass, and began working professionally in Los Angeles. He served in the United States Army during World War II, and then joined Woody Herman's First Herd in 1946. Over the next two decades, he became one of the more popular studio bassists for jazz recording on the West Coast, appearing on albums by June Christy, Shorty Rogers, Shelly Manne, Buddy Rich, Buddy DeFranco, Marty Paich, Claude Williamson, Georgie Auld, Chet Baker, Bob Cooper, Harry Sweets Edison, Gerry Mulligan, Art Pepper, Bud Shank and Ella Fitzgerald. Mondragon can also be heard on soundtracks for films such as The Wild One and Pete Kelly's Blues.

Mondragon never recorded as a leader.

== Personal life and death ==
Mondragon died in San Juan Pueblo, New Mexico.

== Discography ==
With Georgie Auld

- In the Land of Hi-Fi with Georgie Auld and His Orchestra (EmArcy, 1955)

With Chet Baker

- The Trumpet Artistry of Chet Baker (Pacific Jazz, 1953)
- Chet Baker & Strings (Columbia, 1954)
- Pretty/Groovy (World Pacific, 1958)
- Grey December (Pacific Jazz, 1992)
- "Chet Baker & Jack Sheldon In Perfect Harmony: The Lost Album" (Jazz Detective, 2024 (recorded 1972))

With Louie Bellson

- Louis Bellson Swings Jule Styne (Verve, 1960)

With Buddy Bregman

- Swinging Kicks (Verve, 1957)

With Hoagy Carmichael

- Hoagy Sings Carmichael (Pacific Jazz, 1956)

With The Carpenters

- Horizon (A&M Records, 1975)

With Bobby Darin

- Love Swings (Atco Records, 1961)
- Winners (Capitol Records, 1964)
- Venice Blue (Capitol Records, 1965)
- Bobby Darin Sings The Shadow of Your Smile (Atlantic Records, 1966)

With Harry Edison

- Sweets (Clef, 1956)

With Herb Ellis and Jimmy Giuffre

- Herb Ellis Meets Jimmy Giuffre (Verve, 1959)

With The Four Freshmen

- More Four Freshmen and 5 Trombones (Capitol Records, 1961)

With Astrud Gilberto

- The Astrud Gilberto Album (Verve, 1965)

With Johnny Hartman

- I Love Everybody (ABC, 1967)

With Woody Herman

- Songs for Hip Lovers (Verve, 1957)

With Lena Horne

- Lena...Lovely and Alive (RCA Victor, 1962)

With Harry James

- Harry James and His Orchestra 1948–49 (Big Band Landmarks Vol. X & XI, 1969)

With Stan Kenton

- Lush Interlude (Capitol, 1958)

With Barney Kessel

- Carmen (Contemporary, 1959)

With Peggy Lee

- Things Are Swingin' (Capitol Records, 1958)
- Mirrors (A&M Records, 1975)

With Henry Mancini

- More Music from Peter Gunn (RCA, 1959)

With Shelly Manne

- The West Coast Sound (Contemporary, 1955)

With Warne Marsh

- Live in Hollywood (Xanadu, 1979)

With Carmen McRae

- Can't Hide Love (Blue Note, 1976)

With Sérgio Mendes

- Sérgio Mendes' Favorite Things (Atlantic Records, 1968)

With Jack Montrose

- Arranged by Montrose (Pacific Jazz, 1954)

With Gerry Mulligan

- Gerry Mulligan Quartet Volume 1 (Pacific Jazz, 1952)
- Gene Norman Presents the Original Gerry Mulligan Tentet and Quartet (GNP, 1954)
- Lee Konitz Plays with the Gerry Mulligan Quartet (Pacific Jazz, 1957) with Lee Konitz

With Mark Murphy

- This Could Be the Start of Something (Capitol, 1958)
- Mark Murphy's Hip Parade (Capitol, 1959)
- Playing the Field (Capitol, 1960)

With Oliver Nelson

- Zig Zag (Original Motion Picture Score) (MGM, 1970)

With Art Pepper

- Surf Ride (Savoy, 1956)
- Art Pepper + Eleven – Modern Jazz Classics (Contemporary, 1959)

With Jane Powell

- Can't We Be Friends? (Verve, 1956)

With Shorty Rogers

- Collaboration (RCA Victor, 1953) with André Previn
- Shorty Rogers and His Giants (RCA Victor, 1955)
- Afro-Cuban Influence (RCA Victor, 1958)
- Chances Are It Swings (RCA Victor, 1958)
- The Wizard of Oz and Other Harold Arlen Songs (RCA Victor, 1959)
- Shorty Rogers Meets Tarzan (MGM, 1960)
- The Swingin' Nutcracker (RCA Victor, 1960)
- The Fourth Dimension in Sound (Warner Bros., 1961)
- Bossa Nova (Reprise, 1962)
- Jazz Waltz (Reprise, 1962)

With Pete Rugolo

- Music for Hi-Fi Bugs (EmArcy, 1956)
- Out on a Limb (EmArcy, 1956)
- Percussion at Work (EmArcy, 1957)
- An Adventure in Sound: Reeds in Hi-Fi (Mercury, 1958)
- An Adventure in Sound: Brass in Hi-Fi (Mercury, 1958)
- Behind Brigitte Bardot (Warner Bros., 1960)
- The Original Music of Thriller (Time, 1961)
- Ten Trumpets and 2 Guitars (Mercury, 1961)
- 10 Saxophones and 2 Basses (Mercury, 1961)

With Lalo Schifrin

- Gone with the Wave (Colpix, 1964)

With Bud Shank

- Strings & Trombones (Pacific Jazz, 1955)
- I'll Take Romance (World Pacific, 1958)

With Carly Simon

- Playing Possum (Elektra Records, 1975)

With Frank Sinatra

- Come Fly with Me (Capitol Records, 1958)
- Ring-a-Ding-Ding! (Capitol Records, 1961)
- Cycles (Reprise Records, 1968)
- My Way (Reprise Records, 1969)

With Mel Tormé

- Tormé (Verve, 1958)
- Back in Town (Verve, 1959)
- Mel Tormé Swings Shubert Alley (Verve, 1960)
- Comin' Home Baby! (Atlantic, 1962)
- I Dig the Duke! I Dig the Count! (Verve, 1962)
- Mel Tormé Sings Sunday in New York & Other Songs About New York (Atlantic, 1963)

With Paul Williams

- Just an Old Fashioned Love Song (A&M Records, 1971)

== See also ==
- List of jazz bassists
