= Larry Bunker =

American jazz musician (1928–2005)

- Born: Lawrence Benjamin Bunker; November 4, 1928; Long Beach, California, U.S.
- Died: March 8, 2005 (aged 76) Los Angeles, California, U.S.
- Genres: Jazz
- Occupation: Musician
- Instruments: Drums, vibraphone

Lawrence Benjamin Bunker (November 4, 1928 – March 8, 2005) was an American jazz drummer, vibraphonist, and percussionist. A member of the Bill Evans Trio in the mid-1960s, he also played timpani with the Los Angeles Philharmonic orchestra.

== Biography ==
Born in Long Beach, California, Bunker was a central figure on the West Coast jazz scene, one of the relatively few who actually were from the region. In the 1950s and 1960s he appeared at Howard Rumsey's Lighthouse in Hermosa Beach, and performed with Shorty Rogers and His Giants and others. At first he played primarily drums, but increasingly he focused on vibraphone and was later highly regarded for his playing of timpani and various percussion instruments.

A dependable and in-demand studio drummer and vibist, Bunker achieved particular distinction by recording with Billie Holiday, Ella Fitzgerald, Peggy Lee, Diana Krall, and many other jazz greats. In 1952, he was the drummer in one of Art Pepper's first groups. In 1953 and 1954, Bunker played drums in some of the earliest of Gerry Mulligan's groups. From 1963 to 1965, he was, intermittently, the drummer in the Bill Evans trio. His work in movie soundtracks spanned over fifty years, from Stalag 17 (1953) and Glengarry Glen Ross (1992) to The Incredibles (2004), and included soundtracks by John Williams, Henry Mancini, Quincy Jones, Miklós Rózsa, Jerry Goldsmith, Johnny Mandel, Lalo Schifrin and many other composers.

Bunker died of complications of a stroke in Los Angeles at age 76.

== Discography ==
As Leader

- Live at Shelly's Manne-Hole – as The Larry Bunker Quartette featuring Gary Burton (1990)

With Christina Aguilera

- My Kind of Christmas (RCA Records, 2000)

With The Association

- Birthday (Warner Bros., 1968)

With Chet Baker

- Chet Baker Quartet featuring Russ Freeman (Pacific Jazz, 1953)
- Pretty/Groovy (World Pacific, 1958)
- West Coast Live – with Stan Getz (Pacific Jazz, 1997)

With Cheryl Bentyne

- Something Cool (Columbia, 1992)

With Tony Bennett

- Long Ago and Far Away (Columbia, 1958)

With Michael Bolton

- Timeless: The Classics (Columbia, 1992)
- This Is the Time: The Christmas Album (Columbia, 1996)

With Pat Boone

- Pat Boone Sings Guess Who? (London, 1963)

With Tim Buckley

- Sefronia (DiscReet Records, 1973)

With Gary Burton

- Something's Coming! (RCA, 1963)
- The Time Machine (RCA, 1966)

With Benny Carter

- Aspects (United Artists, 1959)

With Rosemary Clooney

- Rosie Swings Softly (Verve, 1960)

With Nat King Cole

- The Nat King Cole Story (Capitol, 1961)
- Those Lazy-Hazy-Crazy Days of Summer (Capitol, 1963)

With Natalie Cole

- Unforgettable... with Love (Elektra Records, 1991)
- Take a Look (Elektra Records, 1993)
- Holly & Ivy (Elektra, 1994)
- Ask a Woman Who Knows (Verve, 2002)

With Harry Connick Jr.

- When My Heart Finds Christmas (Columbia, 1993)

With Buddy Collette

- Man of Many Parts (Contemporary, 1956)

With Bobby Darin

- Love Swings (Atco, 1961)
- Winners (Atco, 1964)
- Bobby Darin Sings The Shadow of Your Smile (Atlantic, 1966)

With Neil Diamond

- Tap Root Manuscript (Uni Records, 1970)

With The 5th Dimension

- Stoned Soul Picnic (Soul City, 1968)
- The Age of Aquarius (Soul City, 1969)
- Portrait (Bell, 1970)
- Love's Lines, Angles and Rhymes (Bell, 1971)
- Individually & Collectively (Bell, 1972)
- Living Together, Growing Together (Bell, 1973)

With Judith Durham

- Gift of Song (A&M, 1970)

With Billy Eckstine

- Billy Eckstine's Imagination (EmArcy, 1958)

With Bill Evans

- Time Remembered (Milestone, 1963)
- At Shelly's Manne-Hole (Riverside, 1963)
- The Bill Evans Trio "Live" (Verve, 1964)
- Waltz for Debby (Philips, 1964)
- Trio '65 (Verve, 1965)
- Bill Evans Trio with Symphony Orchestra (Verve, 1965)

With Clare Fischer

- Surging Ahead (Pacific Jazz, 1963)
- Extension (Pacific Jazz, 1963)
- Thesaurus (Atlantic, 1969)

With Michael Franks

- Michael Franks (Brut, 1973)
- The Art of Tea (Warner Bros. Records, 1976)
- Sleeping Gypsy (Warner Bros. Records, 1977)

With The Four Freshmen

- The Four Freshmen and Five Guitars (Capitol, 1959)

With Stan Getz

- Children of the World (Columbia, 1979)

With Vince Gill

- Breath of Heaven: A Christmas Collection (MCA Records, 1998)

With Dizzy Gillespie

- The New Continent (Limelight, 1962)

With Tramaine Hawkins

- To a Higher Place (Columbia, 1994)

With Woody Herman

- Songs for Hip Lovers (Verve, 1957)

With Richard "Groove" Holmes

- Six Million Dollar Man (RCA, 1975)

With Paul Horn

- House of Horn (Dot, 1957)
- Plenty of Horn (Dot, 1958)
- Impressions of Cleopatra (Columbia, 1963)
- Jazz Suite on the Mass Texts (RCA Victor, 1965) with Lalo Schifrin

With Al Jarreau

- We Got By (Reprise Records, 1975)

With Dr. John

- Afterglow (Blue Thumb, 1995)

With Plas Johnson

- This Must Be the Plas (Capitol, 1959)

With Stan Kenton

- Lush Interlude (Capitol, 1958)
- A Merry Christmas! (Capitol, 1961)
- Artistry in Bossa Nova (Capitol, 1963)
- Artistry in Voices and Brass (Capitol, 1963)
- Stan Kenton Plays for Today (Capitol, 1966)

With Diana Krall

- When I Look in Your Eyes (Verve, 1999)

With Peggy Lee

- Black Coffee (Decca, 1956)
- Dream Street (Decca, 1957)
- I Like Men! (Capitol, 1959)
- Blues Cross Country (Capitol, 1962)
- Guitars a là Lee (Capitol, 1966)
- Mirrors (A&M, 1975)

With Lou Levy

- Jazz in Four Colors (RCA, 1959)

With Jon Lucien

- Song for My Lady (Columbia, 1975)

With Johnny Mandel

- I Want to Live (United Artists, 1958)

With Barry Manilow

- Showstoppers (Arista, 1991)
- Manilow Sings Sinatra (Arista, 1998)

With Shelly Manne

- Daktari (Atlantic, 1967)

With Carmen McRae

- It Takes a Whole Lot of Human Feeling (Groove Merchant, 1973)
- Can't Hide Love (Blue Note, 1976)

With Gerry Mulligan

- Gerry Mulligan Quartet Volume 1 (Pacific Jazz, 1952)
- Gene Norman Presents the Original Gerry Mulligan Tentet and Quartet (GNP, 1953)
- California Concerts (Pacific Jazz, 1955)
- Lee Konitz Plays with the Gerry Mulligan Quartet (Pacific Jazz, 1957) with Lee Konitz

With Mark Murphy

- Mark Murphy's Hip Parade (Capitol, 1960)

With Walter Murphy

- Walter Murphy's Discosymphony (New York, 1979)

With Oliver Nelson

- Soulful Brass with Steve Allen (Impulse!, 1968)

With Robert Palmer

- Ridin' High (EMI, 1992)

With Art Pepper

- Surf Ride (Savoy, 1956)

With Shorty Rogers

- Wherever the Five Winds Blow (RCA Victor, 1957)
- Gigi in Jazz (RCA Victor, 1958)
- The Wizard of Oz and Other Harold Arlen Songs (RCA Victor, 1959)
- Jazz Waltz (Reprise, 1962)

With Kenny Rogers

- Timepiece (143, 1994)

With Linda Ronstadt

- Canciones de Mi Padre (Elektra Records, 1987)

With Pete Rugolo

- Music for Hi-Fi Bugs (EmArcy, 1956)
- Percussion at Work (EmArcy, 1957)
- An Adventure in Sound: Brass in Hi-Fi (Mercury, 1958)
- The Music from Richard Diamond (EmArcy, 1959)
- Behind Brigitte Bardot (Warner Bros., 1960)
- The Original Music of Thriller (Time, 1961)
- Ten Trumpets and 2 Guitars (Mercury, 1961)

With The Sandpipers

- Come Saturday Morning (A&M, 1970)
- A Gift of Song (A&M, 1971)

With Lalo Schifrin

- More Mission: Impossible (Paramount, 1968)
- Mannix (Paramount, 1968)
- Bullitt (Warner Bros., 1968)
- Che! (Tetragrammaton, 1969)
- Kelly's Heroes (MGM, 1970)
- Rock Requiem (Verve, 1971)
- Enter the Dragon (Warner Bros., 1973)

With Diane Schuur

- In Tribute (GRP, 1992)

With Bud Shank

- Strings & Trombones (Pacific Jazz, 1955) with Bob Brookmeyer
- I'll Take Romance (World Pacific, 1958)
- Bossa Nova Jazz Samba (Pacific Jazz, 1962) with Clare Fischer
- Brasamba! (Pacific Jazz, 1963) with Clare Fischer and Joe Pass
- Bud Shank & the Sax Section (Pacific Jazz, 1966)

With Nina Simone

- A Single Woman (Elektra, 1993)

With Frank Sinatra

- Swing Along With Me (Reprise, 1961)
- Ring-a-Ding-Ding! (Reprise, 1961)
- Moonlight Sinatra (Reprise, 1966)
- Cycles (Reprise, 1968)
- A Man Alone (Reprise, 1969)
- Sinatra & Company (Reprise, 1971)
- Trilogy: Past Present Future (Reprise, 1980)

With The Singers Unlimited

- Feeling Free (MPS, 1975)
- Friends (Pausa, 1977)

With B. W. Stevenson

- We Be Sailin' (Warner Bros., 1975)

With Donna Summer

- Donna Summer (Geffen, 1982)

With Lew Tabackin

- Tenor Gladness (Disco Mate, 1976) with Warne Marsh

With The Manhattan Transfer

- The Christmas Album (Columbia, 1992)

With Mel Tormé

- ¡Olé Tormé! (Verve, 1959)
- Comin' Home Baby! (Atlantic, 1962)

With U2

- Rattle and Hum (Island, 1988)

With Sarah Vaughan

- Sarah Vaughan with Michel Legrand (Mainstream Records, 1972)

With Wendy Waldman

- Love Has Got Me (Warner Bros. Records, 1973)
