= Richard Bock (music producer) =

American jazz record producer

Richard Eugene Bock (January 22, 1927 – February 6, 1988) was an American jazz record producer.

Bock was born in Syracuse, New York, United States. He briefly worked for Discovery Records in 1950 and 1951, then founded the label Pacific Jazz in Los Angeles with drummer Roy Harte in 1952. He would serve as producer of hundreds of sessions in cool jazz and West Coast jazz for Pacific Jazz, working with Gerry Mulligan, Joe Pass, Chet Baker, Art Pepper, Chico Hamilton, Jim Hall, Bud Shank, Buddy Rich, Wes Montgomery, Richard "Groove" Holmes, Les McCann, Gerald Wilson, and the Jazz Crusaders. Bock would also be responsible for launching the careers of prominent jazz musicians, and can be credited with the discovery of Joe Pass while he was coming clean from heroin addiction in the Synanon drug rehabilitation program in the early 1960s. Wes Montgomery's composition "Bock to Bock" is named after Bock.

In 1958, Bock worked on a session with Ravi Shankar, then started a subsidiary label, World Pacific, which released music other than jazz. He worked with the label even after selling it to Liberty Records in 1965, and did recording sessions with them until 1970. He signed and produced three albums with Jean-Luc Ponty including King Kong (1970) in collaboration with Frank Zappa. He later worked as a producer for films, and in the 1980s also worked with the reformulated Contemporary Records. He worked closely with L. Subramaniam and produced some of his historic global fusion albums starting with Fantasy Without Limits (1979). The finest jazz fusion albums of L. Subramaniam in the 1980s were produced by Bock including Spanish Wave (1983). Indian Express (1983), Conversation (1984) (with Stéphane Grappelli), and Mani and Co. (1986).

He died in Los Angeles, California, aged 61.
