= Bernie Miller =

American composer

Bernie Miller (1919–1945) was a native of Washington, DC and is best known as the composer of "Bernie's Tune", a 1950s jazz standard that was popularized by the Gerry Mulligan Quartet and brought attention to the West Coast Jazz movement. In 1955, songwriters Jerry Leiber and Mike Stoller added lyrics to "Bernie's Tune."

== Additional information ==
In his book, "Fifties Jazz Talk: An Oral Retrospective (Studies in Jazz)", author Gordon Jack included an interview with Gerry Mulligan where Mulligan stated, "Bernie Miller wrote "Bernie's Tune," but I never knew him. As far as I know, he was a piano player from Washington D.C., and I think he had died by the time I encountered any of his tunes. He had a melodic touch, and he wrote a couple of other pieces that musicians liked to play."

Miller is also known for composing the jazz tune, "Loaded", which was covered by Chet Baker, Stan Getz, Vido Musso, Kai Winding, and Peter Griesar.
