= Carson Smith (musician) =

American jazz double-bassist

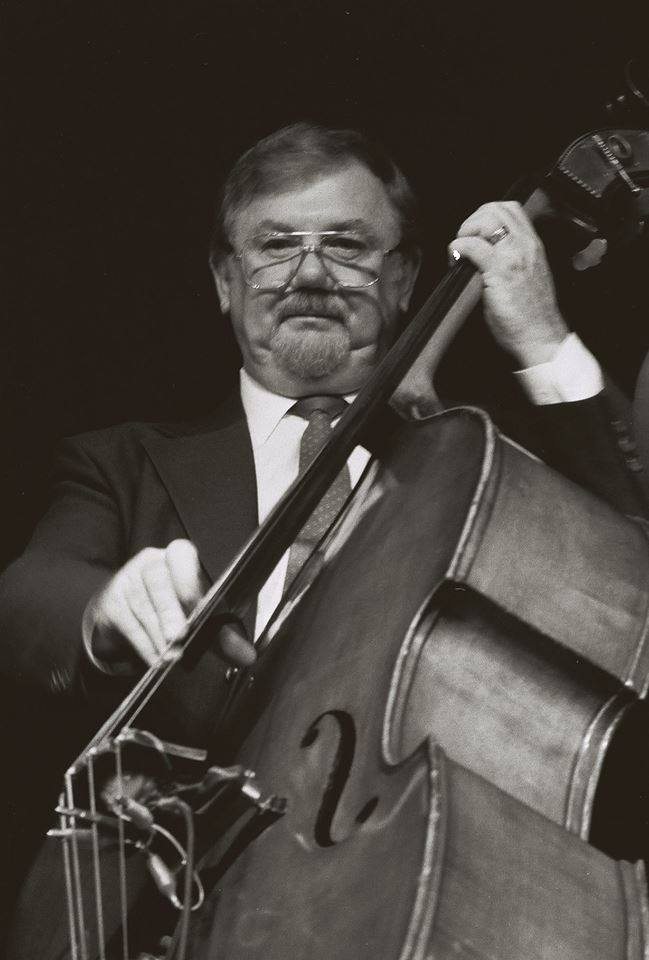

Background information
- Born: Carson Raymond Smith; January 9, 1931; San Francisco, California, U.S.
- Died: November 2, 1997 (aged 66) Las Vegas, Nevada, U.S.
- Genres: Jazz
- Occupation: Musician
- Instrument: Double bass
- Years active: 1952–unknown

Carson Raymond Smith (January 9, 1931, San Francisco – November 2, 1997, Las Vegas) was an American jazz double-bassist. Carson is the older brother of jazz musician and composer Putter Smith.

Smith's early work was in West Coast jazz, playing with Gerry Mulligan (1952–53), Chet Baker (1953–55), Russ Freeman (1955–56), and Chico Hamilton (1955–57). Smith also recorded with Clifford Brown (1954), Dick Twardzik (1954), and Billie Holiday at Carnegie Hall (1956). In 1959, he toured with Stan Kenton, then recorded with Charlie Barnet in 1960. In 1962, he moved to Los Angeles, playing with Charlie Teagarden (1962) and Lionel Hampton (1963). He toured Japan with Georgie Auld in 1964. Later in the 1960s, he played with Buddy Rich, Arno Marsh, and Carl Fontana. He held a longtime residency at the Four Queens Hotel in Las Vegas, where he accompanied visiting musicians such as Art Farmer, Lew Tabackin, Zoot Sims, and Chet Baker.

He died of cancer in Las Vegas at the age of 66.

== Discography ==
=== As sideman ===
With Chet Baker

- Sings and Plays with Bud Shank, Russ Freeman and Strings (Pacific Jazz, 1955)
- Chet Baker Sings (Pacific Jazz, 1956)
- The Trumpet Artistry of Chet Baker (Pacific Jazz, 1955)
- Jazz at Ann Arbor (Pacific Jazz, 1955)

With Chico Hamilton

- Chico Hamilton Quintet (Pacific Jazz, 1955)
- Chico Hamilton Quintet in Hi-Fi (Pacific Jazz, 1956)
- Sweet Smell of Success (Brunswick, 1957)
- Ellington Suite (World Pacific, 1959)
- The Original Chico Hamilton Quintet (World Pacific, 1960)
- Spectacular! (World Pacific Jazz, 1968)

With others

- Clifford Brown, Jazz Immortal (Pacific Jazz, 1960)
- Lionel Hampton & Charlie Teagarden, The Great Hamp and Little T (Coral, 1963)
- Fred Katz, Zen: The Music of Fred Katz (Pacific Jazz, 1957)
- Dick Marx, Marx Makes Broadway (Omega Disk, 1958)
- Gerry Mulligan, Gerry Mulligan Quartet (Pacific Jazz, 1955)
- Gerry Mulligan, Mulligan and Baker! (Jazztone, 1957)
- Jack Montrose Presents Bob Gordon Quintet, Clifford Brown Ensemble, Arranged by Montrose (Pacific Jazz, 1956)
- Buddy Rich, Swingin' New Big Band (Pacific Jazz, 1966)
- Dick Twardzik, The Last Set (Pacific Jazz, 1962)
- Tommy Vig, The Tommy Vig Orchestra (Take V, 1965)
- Emily Remler, Cookin at the Queens: Live in Las Vegas 1984 & 1988 (Resonance, 2024)
