= Clare Fischer discography =

This is the discography for American jazz musician Clare Fischer.

== As leader ==
- Jazz (1961, in Mexico City, with Víctor Ruiz Pazos, double bass; Salvador Agüero Rabito, drum; Jesús Aguirre, trombone; Chilo Morán and Nacho Rosales, trumpets; Juan Ravelo, Primitivo Ornelas and Tomás Rodríguez, saxophones)
- First Time Out (Pacific Jazz, 1962)
- Bossa Nova Jazz Samba (Pacific Jazz, 1962) with Bud Shank
- Brasamba! (Pacific Jazz, 1963) with Bud Shank and Joe Pass
- Surging Ahead (Pacific Jazz, 1963)
- Extension (Pacific Jazz, 1963)
- So Danço Samba (Pacific Jazz, 1964)
- Manteca! (Pacific Jazz, 1965)
- Easy Livin' (1966)
- Songs for Rainy Day Lovers (1967) – reissued in 1978
- One to Get Ready, Four to Go (1968)
- Thesaurus (1969) – reissued in 1979
- Great White Hope (& His Japanese Friend) (1970)
- Love is Surrender: Ralph Carmichael Presents the Multi-Keyboards of Clare Fischer (1971)
- T'DA-A-A! (1972) – Clare Fischer & the Yamaha Quartet
- Clare Fischer In the Reclamation Act of 1972! (1972)
- Tell It Like It Is (1972)
- Report of the 1st Annual Symposium on Relaxed Improvisation (1973) – with Warne Marsh and Gary Foster
- Music Inspired by the Kinetic Sculpture of Don Conard Mobiles (1975)
- The State of His Art (1976)
- Clare Declares (1977)
- America the Beautiful (1978) – previously released as Songs for Rainy Day Lovers in 1967
- Jazz Song (1979)
- 'Twas Only Yesterday (1979) – previously released as Thesaurus in 1968
- Clare Fischer & EX-42 (1979) – originally released as T'DA-A-A! in 1972
- Duality (1980)
- Salsa Picante (1980)
- Alone Together (1980) – Clare Fischer & the Brunner-Schwer Steinway, re-released in 1997
- 2+2 (1981) – winner Grammy Award for Best Latin Recording
- Machaca (1981)
- Head, Heart and Hands (1982)
- And Sometimes Voices (1982) – with 2+2
- September Afternoon (1982) – with Donald Byrd
- Starbright (1983) – with Gary Foster
- Whose Woods Are These? (1984) – with Gary Foster, Grammy nomination
- Extension (1984) – with Jerry Coker
- Crazy Bird (1985) – Re-released in 1992
- Free Fall (1986) – winner Grammy Award for Best Jazz Vocal Performance, Duo or Group
- Clare Fischer Plays (1987)
- Tjaderama (1987)
- Blues Trilogy (1987) – with Gary Foster
- Waltz (1988)
- Remembrances (Lembranças) (1990)
- Memento (1992)
- Just Me: Solo Piano Excursions (1995)
- Rockin' in Rhythm (1997) – Clare Fischer & Friends
- The Latin Side (1997) – Clare Fischer & Metropole Orchestra
- Clare Fischer's Jazz Corps (1998)
- Latin Patterns (1999) – Clare Fischer & The Legendary MPS Sessions
- Symbiosis (1999) – Clare Fischer & Hélio Delmiro
- Bert van den Brink Invites Clare Fischer (2000)
- After the Rain (2001)
- On a Turquoise Cloud (2002)
- Introspectivo (2005)
- A Family Affair (2006)
- ...And Sometimes Instruments (2011) – The Clare Fischer Voices
- Continuum (2011) – The Clare Fischer Big Band
- ¡Ritmo! (2012) – The Clare Fischer Latin Jazz Big Band, winner Grammy Award for Best Latin Jazz Album
- Music for Strings, Percussion and the Rest (2013) – winner Grammy Award for Best Instrumental Composition (for "Pensiamento for Solo Alto Saxophone and Chamber Orchestra")

== As arranger ==
With Donald Byrd

- September Afternoon (Discovery, 1982) – recorded in 1956 and 1957

With Gene Puerling

- and The Hi-Lo's
  - Suddenly It's the Hi-Lo's (Columbia, 1957) – uncredited, also piano
  - Ring Around Rosie (Columbia, 1957) – uncredited, also piano
  - Love Nest (Columbia, 1958) – uncredited, also piano
  - The Hi-Lo's and All That Jazz (Columbia, 1959) – also piano
  - This Time It's Love (Columbia, 1962)
  - Now - The Hi-Lo's! (Pausa, 1981) – also electric piano
- and Singers Unlimited
  - A Special Blend (MPS, 1976) – also electric piano

With Dizzy Gillespie

- A Portrait of Duke Ellington (Verve, 1960)

With Al Grey

- The Thinking Man's Trombone (1960) – 5-part a capella arrangement for trumpet, two trombones, tenor and baritone saxophones on "Tenderly"

With Cal Tjader

- West Side Story (Fantasy, 1960) – also piano
- Cal Tjader Plays Harold Arlen (Fantasy, 1962)
- Cal Tjader Plays the Contemporary Music of Mexico and Brazil (Verve, 1962) – also piano

With George Shearing

- Shearing Bossa Nova (Fantasy, 1963)

With Stan Kenton

- Stan Kenton Conducts the Los Angeles Neophonic Orchestra (Capitol, 1965)

With David Raksin

- 'Will Penny': Music from the Motion Picture and Other Themes (Dot, 1968) – arranged "Flugelhorn Samba"

With Willie Ruff

- The Smooth Side of Ruff (Columbia Records, 1968) – orchestral arrangement on "Pa Moscunia Vechera"

With Hubert Laws

- In the Beginning (CTI, 1974) – also piano

With Rufus (band)

- Rufus Featuring Chaka Khan (album) (ABC Records, 1975), Ask Rufus (ABC Records, 1977), Street Player (ABC Records, 1978) all string arrangements

With The Jacksons

- Destiny (Epic, 1978) – string arrangements on "Push Me Away"

With Osamu Kitajima

- Masterless Samurai (1978), strings on "Breath of Night"

With Charles Lloyd

- Autumn in New York (Destiny, 1979) - also conductor

With Switch

- Reaching for Tomorrow (Gordy, 1980), strings on "A Brighter Tomorrow"

With Carlos Santana

- String arrangement on "Vereda Tropical" on the Havana Moon LP (1983), misspelled as Claire Fisher

With Neil Diamond

- Headed for the Future (Columbia, 1985)

With The Baylor University A Cappella Choir

- Fairest Lord Jesus (Word, 1986) – hymn settings

With Desiree Coleman

- Desiree (Motown, 1988) – string arrangement on "Until Tonight"

With Robert Palmer

- Heavy Nova (EMI, 1988) – string arrangements
- Don't Explain (EMI, 1990)
- Ridin' High (EMI, 1992)

With Pieces of a Dream

- School Daze (OST) (EMI, 1988)

With Paul McCartney

- Flowers in the Dirt (EMI, 1989) – orchestral arrangement on "Distractions" and on "The Lovers That Never Were" (unreleased)

With Al Jarreau

- Music From 'Do the Right Thing' (Motown, 1989) – string arrangement on "Never Explain Love"

With Paulyna Carraz

- Paulyna Carraz (Melody, 1990) – string arrangements on "Delirio" and "Otra Vez" (also played piano on "Cosa Como Tu")

With The Family Stand

- Moon in the Scorpio (Nocturnal Art, 1991)

With João Gilberto

- João (Verve, 1991)

With Diane Schuur

- In Tribute (GRP, 1992) – string arrangements and piano on "The Man I Love" and "'Round Midnight"

With Jevetta Steele

- Here It Is (Sony Music Entertainment, 1993) – string arrangement on "Hold Me"

With Terry Trotter

- It's About Time (MAMA, 1993) – also electric piano, liner notes

With Lalah Hathaway

- A Moment (1994) – orchestrations and string arrangements on "I'm Not Over You"

With Najee

- Najee Plays Songs from the Key of Life: A Tribute to Stevie Wonder (Capitol, 1995) – strings on "Village Ghetto Land"

With Dee Dee Bridgewater

- Prelude to a Kiss: The Duke Ellington Album (Philips Classics, 1996) – orchestral arrangement on "Mood Indigo"

With Chanticleer

- Lost in the Stars (Teldec, 1996) – "In the Still of the Night" (Grammy nominee for "Best instrumental arrangement accompanied by vocals")

With John Pizzarelli

- Let's Share Christmas (RCA, 1996)

With Carl Saunders

- Eclecticism (SNL, 2000)

With Toni Braxton

- Snowflakes (Arista, 2001) – string arrangements on "Santa Please," "Pretty Please" (Interlude), and "Have Yourself a Merry Little Christmas"
- More Than a Woman (Arista, 2002), orchestral arrangements

With Terri Walker

- Untitled (Def Soul, Mercury, 2002) – conductor, string arrangements

== As sideman ==
With Bud Shank

- Bossa Nova Jazz Samba (Pacific Jazz, 1962) – piano
- Brasamba! (Pacific Jazz, 1963) – piano

With Cal Tjader

- Cal Tjader Plays, Mary Stallings Sings (Fantasy, 1962) – piano, arrangements
- Soña Libré (Verve, 1963) – organ, piano
- Guarabe (Fantasy, 1977) – electric piano
- Huracán (Crystal Clear, 1978) – electric piano
- Here (Galaxy, 1977 [1979])

With Joe Pass

- Catch Me! (Pacific Jazz, 1963) – piano and organ

With The Jazz Crusaders

- Chile Con Soul (Pacific Jazz, 1965) – organ

With Lenita Bruno

- Work of Love (Nucleus, 1967) – keyboards

With Bill Stewart

- The Bill Stewart Show. 500 (RU 24-8 [Dec. 1967]) (AFRTS, 1967) – LP recording of one-hour radio show with guest Clare Fischer

With Ralph Carmichael

- Songs of Living Hope (Stylist, 1967) – piano and organ

With Quincy Jones

- The Hot Rock OST (Prophesy, 1972)
- Dollar$: Music from the Original Motion Picture Soundtrack (Reprise, 1972)

With Moacir Santos

- Maestro (Blue Note, 1972)
- Carnival of the Spirits (Blue Note, 1975)

With Lalo Schifrin

- Enter the Dragon (soundtrack) (Warner Bros., 1973)

With Disneyland Records

- Island at the Top of the World (DR ST-3814, 1974) – 'Storyteller' LP adaptation of feature film features Fischer adapting Maurice Jarre's score for organ.
- Escape From Witch Island (DR ST-3809, 1975) – 'Storyteller' LP adaptation of feature film features Fischer adapting Johnny Mandel's score for organ.

With Laurindo Almeida

- Virtuoso Guitar (Crystal Clear, 1977) – piano, electric piano (45 RPM limited edition)

With Art Pepper

- Tokyo Debut [live] (Galaxy, 1977 [1995])

With Donald Byrd

- Donald Byrd and 125th Street, N.Y.C. (Elektra, 1979) - keyboards

With Bill Perkins

- Many Ways to Go (Sea Breeze, 1980) – organ

With various artists

- Black and White (Columbia, 1981)

With Sandi Shoemake

- Slowly (Discovery, 1984)

With Lisa Rich

- Touch of the Rare (Trend, 1985)

With Jon Crosse

- Lullabies Go Jazz: Sweet Songs for Sweet Dreams (Jazz Cat, 1985)
- Peter and the Wolf Play Jazz (Jazz Cat, 1989)

With Jeff Berlin

- Pump It (Passport, 1986)
- Taking Notes (Denon, 1997)
- Crossroads (Denon, 1998)
- In Harmony's Way (M.A.J. 2001)

With Larry Carlton

- Christmas at My House (MCA, 1989) – electric piano

With Amy Grant

- Home for Christmas (A&M, 1992)

With Ettore Stratta & The Royal Philharmonic Orchestra

- Symphonic Boleros (Teldec, 1993) – piano on César Portillo's "Delirio" and María Grever's "Cuando Vuelva a tu Lado," both arranged by Jorge Calandrelli

With Armando Manzanero

- El Piano Manzanero y sus amigos (1995) on "Como yo te amé" (arranged by Jorge Calandrelli) and "Ojalá Que Seas Tú"; acoustic piano. BMG U.S. Latin – 7 43212 61222 6, RCA – 7 43212 61222 6

With Nestor Torres

- Talk to Me (Sony Discos, 1996) – electric piano on "Sabor a Mí" and "If"
