= Pensativa =

1962 composition by Clare Fischer

Composition by Clare Fischer

from the album Bossa Nova Jazz Samba
- Released: September 1, 1962
- Genre: Bossa nova, jazz
- Length: 3:28
- Label: Pacific Jazz
- Composer: Clare Fischer
- Producer: Albert Marx

"Pensativa" is a bossa nova jazz standard by American pianist/composer/arranger Clare Fischer, first recorded in 1962 by a quintet under the joint leadership of Fischer and saxophonist Bud Shank, and released that year as part of an album entitled Bossa Nova Jazz Samba, comprising music in this style, as per its title, all of it arranged by Fischer, and, with the exception of Erroll Garner's "Misty", composed by him as well. This would prove to be just the first of countless forays by Fischer into various areas of Latin music (with "area" denoting both genre and geographic region). This particular song was one of the first, and almost certainly the most famous, of all the foreign-born - i.e. non-Brazilian - bossa novas. Its form, though extended (64 mm.), is standard A-A-B-A, with each section consisting of 16 measures instead of eight.

== Alternate versions ==
With the exception of his contrastingly Cuban-styled composition, "Morning", "Pensativa" is by far Fischer's most frequently recorded work; it has been performed by a wide variety of instrumental groupings, ranging from assorted unaccompanied instruments - including piano, guitar and flute - to string orchestras, big bands, and a large assortment of ensemble sizes in between.

In addition to numerous recordings by the composer himself (including at least five released under his own name, plus many more featuring the composer as either co-leader, sideman, or arranger, all of them employing Fischer's arrangements), (Note: These include George Shearing, Gary Foster, Charles Lloyd, Poncho Sanchez, vocalists Sandi Shoemake and Lisa Rich (debuting and reprising, respectively, Fischer's retrospectively added lyrics), and pianist Terry Trotter -) it has been covered by a multitude of artists, including Bill Evans, Dave Valentin, Gene Harris, Jack Wilson, Bill Perkins, Brian Bromberg, Bob Florence, and Rob McConnell. Many more, including George Shearing, Gene Bertoncini, Hubert Laws, Billy Taylor, Bill Mays, Marian McPartland, Benny Green, Sam Most, Gary Foster, and Freddie Hubbard, have made "Pensativa" part of their regular repertoires.

In fact, of all the recordings made of this song (including those by the composer), by far the best known is the one arranged by Hubbard and recorded in 1964 by Art Blakey & the Jazz Messengers, released in 1964 on the album Free for All. (Note: According to the original liner notes Free For All, written by Nat Hentoff, Hubbard first heard the tune when he was on a gig in Long Island: "...and the pianist started playing it. The mood got me, this feeling of a pensive woman. And the melody was so beautiful that, after I'd gotten home, I couldn't get it out of my mind." Thomas Cunniffe on Jazz History Online writes: "The piece is ostensibly a bossa nova, but Blakey avoids the traditional samba beat and plays a deliciously loose and swinging Latin groove. Hubbard and Fuller share Fischer’s glorious melody, and Hubbard’s solo is one of his all-time best, balancing abstract length phrases and unadulterated lyricism. Shorter is more melodic here than anywhere else on the album, and Walton sparkles through his beautifully-crafted solo. Although Hubbard recorded an extended version of “Pensativa” on the 1965 Blue Note album, The Night of the Cookers, it is the rendition on “Free for All” that remains the undisputed classic.") While not surprising, given the All-Star calibre of its participants (the iconic Blakey himself, and his no less iconic Jazz Messengers, in this instance including three premiere soloists - pianist Cedar Walton and Hubbard on trumpet, plus the influential saxophonist and composer Wayne Shorter), this state of affairs would prove extremely frustrating to the composer. Speaking to students at an informal clinic hosted by his brother Dirk in October 1998, Fischer explained:

That has been recorded by some jazz players - Freddie Hubbard is one of them. They don't understand two-beat samba, so they play it like a 4... [demonstrating], then they change the melody, then they change the chords, which are going into what we call bebop II-V. Mine go [plays mm. 9 through 13]. He recorded that with Art Blakey. Very famous. 85 percent of the people who know that song know it from that recording. Everyone who records it now plays it with the same cancer that I've had all my life with that song. I've been unable to disestablish that because I don't sell as many records as Freddie Hubbard. It gets to a point where you say, "Hey! It's my song. Yeah." Well, it doesn't make any difference.

== Lyrics ==
Fischer's belatedly added lyrics for "Pensativa" were unveiled in 1984 by vocalist Sandi Shoemake accompanied by the composer on Shoemake's album Slowly, recorded in 1982. They were promptly reprised in 1985, again with Fischer accompanying, this time with a full rhythm section, on singer Lisa Rich's second album, Touch of the Rare. Subsequent vocal recordings have been made by Kaz Simmons (2004), and Iain Mackenzie (2007), the latter singing his own lyrics. Jazz singer Jan Wentz performed "Pensativa" with her own lyrics but never recorded them.

As with each new dawn
Sun is giving the breath of day,
And warms the cold from night
And hovers softly o'er the sea of day.

And now with the twilight
You sit pensive and lost it seems
What lived so near last night
Is now converted into empty dreams.

For day starts once more anew
And lifts you from the clutching bonds of night
And leads you once more in search of happiness
Ever seeking on and on, searching endlessly for what is gone.

Then night drops its curtain
Making certain your loneliness
And fills a longing cloud [also: "and drops a shroud of gloom" - better!]
That leaves you in your lonely pensiveness.

== Selected recordings ==
- Bud Shank & Clare Fischer - Bossa Nova Jazz Samba, 1962
- George Shearing - Shearing Bossa Nova, 1963, woodwinds arranged by Fischer.
- Bill Perkins - Bossa Nova with Strings Attached, 1963, arranged by Bob Florence.
- Clare Fischer - So Danço Samba, 1964
- Art Blakey & the Jazz Messengers - Free For All, 1964, arranged by Freddie Hubbard.
- Freddie Hubbard - The Night of the Cookers, recorded live at Club La Marchal, April 1965.
- Gary Foster - Subconsciously, 1968, with Fischer, piano.
- Cedar Walton - Soul Cycle, 1969
- Clare Fischer - Reclamation Act of 1972, 1970
- Hubert Laws - Wild Flower, 1972, with string orchestra, arranged by John Murtaugh.
- John Hicks - Steadfast, recorded 1975, released 1980
- George Shearing - The Many Facets of George Shearing, 1977, duet with bassist Andy Simpkins.
- Bill Evans - Crosscurrents, recorded in 1977, released in 1978; also features saxophonists Warne Marsh and Lee Konitz.
- Charles Lloyd - Autumn in New York, 1979, strings arranged and conducted by Fischer.
- Poncho Sanchez - Straight Ahead, 1980, with Fischer, piano, arranger & conductor.
- Sandi Shoemake - Slowly, recorded 1982, released 1984; features Fischer on piano, accompanying Shoemake, who debuts the composer's belatedly added lyrics.
- Ed Bickert - Bye Bye Baby, 1983
- Lisa Rich (featuring the Clare Fischer Quartet) - Touch of the Rare, 1985, again featuring Fischer's lyrics, with the composer on piano and his son Brent on bass.
- Gene Bertoncini, Michael Moore, Edison Machado - O Grande Amor: A Bossa Nova Collection, 1986
- James L. Dean - Ceora, 1990, featuring Claudio Roditi
- Dave Valentin - Red Sun, 1992
- George Shearing - Walkin' , 1992
- Gene Harris - A Little Piece Of Heaven, 1993
- Terry Trotter - It's About Time, 1993, arranged by Fischer, who also follows Trotter's solo with his own uncredited half-chorus on electric piano.
- Eastman Jazz Ensemble - Live performance at the Eastman Theatre, recorded November 12, 1993, never released; arranged by Dirk Fischer (the composer's brother), conducted by Bill Dobbins, featuring Gary Foster.
- Clare Fischer - Just Me: Solo Piano Excursions, 1995
- Bill Harris - Solo + One, 1997
- Rob McConnell & the Boss Brass - Play the Jazz Classics, 1997
- Clare Fischer - The Latin Side, 1998, with the Metropole Orchestra, arranged by Fischer, who also plays piano, accompanying clarinetist Don Shelton.
- Michael Moore - The History of Jazz, Volume 1, 2000, with Ken Peplowski and Tom Melito
- Toledo Jazz Orchestra - Out of Nowhere, 2000
- Manhattan School of Music Jazz Philharmonic Orchestra - Concert of May 17, 2002, recorded live, not released; arranged by and featuring Michael Abene.
- Clare Fischer & Helio Delmiro - Symbiosis, 2003
- Henry Franklin - Three Card Molly, 2004
- Bob Florence - Friends, Treasures, Heroes, 2005
- Sherrie Maricle & The Diva Jazz Orchestra - TNT: A Tommy Newsom Tribute, 2005, arranged by Tommy Newsom.
- Brian Bromberg - Wood II, 2006
- Jim Self - InnerPlay, 2005, strings arranged by Brad Dechter, featuring Self on tuba and long-time Fischer colleague Gary Foster on flute.
- Doug Beavers 9 - Two Shades of Nude, 2010, featuring trumpeter Alex Sipiagin.
- Quinn Johnson - Tunes, Bits and Other Pieces, 2011
- Bill Harris Quintet - Inside Out, 2012
- Roseanna Vitro - Clarity: Music of Clare Fischer, 2014
