= Blue Spirit =

Blue spirit may refer to

- "The Blue Spirit", season 1, episode 13 of Avatar: The Last Airbender.
- Blue Spirit (company), French animation studio that co-produced Blue Eye Samurai.
- Blue Spirits, album by Freddie Hubbard.
