= Bossa Nova Jazz Samba =

Studio album by Bud Shank and Clare Fischer
- Released: 1962
- Recorded: September 1962; Hollywood, CA
- Genre: Jazz
- Label: Pacific Jazz; PJ 58
- Producer: Albert Marx

Bud Shank chronology
Barefoot Adventure (1961)	Bossa Nova Jazz Samba (1962)	Brasamba! (1963)

Clare Fischer chronology
First Time Out (1962)	Bossa Nova Jazz Samba (1962)	Surging Ahead (1963)

Bossa Nova Jazz Samba is an album by saxophonist Bud Shank and pianist Clare Fischer released on the Pacific Jazz label, and is in the genre of bossa nova.

== Track listing ==
All compositions by Clare Fischer, except as indicated

1. "Samba da Borboleta" - 3:32
2. "Illusao" - 3:22
3. "Pensativa" - 3:28
4. "Joao" - 3:54
5. "Misty" (Erroll Garner) - 2:35
6. "Que Mais?" - 3:56
7. "Wistful Samba" - 4:16
8. "Samba Guapo" - 4:20

== Personnel ==
- Bud Shank - alto saxophone
- Clare Fischer - piano
- Ralph Pena - bass
- Larry Bunker, Frank Guerrero, Milt Holland, Bob Neel - percussion
