= The Night of the Cookers: Live at Club la Marchal =

1965 live album by Freddie Hubbard

Live album by Freddie Hubbard
- Released: 1965 (Vol. 1); 1966 (Vol. 2)
- Recorded: April 9–10, 1965
- Venues: La Marchal; Brooklyn, NYC
- Genre: Jazz
- Length: 42:57 (Vol. 1); 43:58 (Vol. 2); 86:55 (CD)
- Label: Blue Note
- Producer: Alfred Lion

Freddie Hubbard chronology
Blue Spirits (1965)	The Night of the Cookers: Live at Club la Marchal (1965)	Jam Gems: Live at the Left Bank (2001)

The Night of the Cookers: Live at Club la Marchal, Vols. 1 & 2 are a pair of separate but related live albums by American jazz trumpeter Freddie Hubbard recorded at La Marchal jazz club in Brooklyn, New York City, over Friday and Saturday night, April 9–10, 1965, and released on Blue Note in 1965 and 1966 respectively. The septet features horn section Freddie Hubbard, Lee Morgan, James Spaulding, rhythm section Harold Mabern, Jr., Larry Ridley and Pete LaRoca, and percussionist Big Black.

== Reception ==
Professional ratings
Review scores
Source	Rating
AllMusic	2.5/5 stars
The Rolling Stone Jazz & Blues Album Guide	4/5 stars
The Penguin Guide to Jazz Recordings	2/4 stars

AllMusic critic Ron Wynn says: "Hubbard was a master of tonguing effects, high-voltage upper notes, and long phrases, while Morgan was a hypnotic improviser. The two trumpeters, despite their consistent brilliance, were almost outdistanced by alto saxophonist and flutist James Spaulding, then at his peak. Spaulding's effortlessly played, torrid alto solos were explosive and often dazzling. The rhythm section grounded the proceedings in elastic and sympathetic rhythms, providing the final element in the formula comprising two tremendous albums, and now one great CD package."

== Track listing ==
=== The Night of the Cookers: Live at Club la Marchal, Volume 1 ===
Side 1
No.	Title	Writer(s)	Length
1.	"Pensativa"	Clare Fischer	23:30

Side 2
No.	Title	Writer(s)	Length
1.	"Walkin'"	Richard Carpenter	19:27

=== The Night of the Cookers: Live at Club la Marchal, Volume 2 ===
All tracks are written by Freddie Hubbard.

Side 1
No.	Title	Length
1.	"Jodo"	22:15

Side 2
No.	Title	Length
1.	"Breaking Point"	21:43

== Personnel ==
- Freddie Hubbard – trumpet
- Lee Morgan – trumpet
- James Spaulding – alto saxophone, flute
- Harold Mabern, Jr. – piano
- Larry Ridley – bass
- Pete LaRoca – drums
- Danny "Big Black" Rey – congas
