= Só Danço Samba =

Só Danço Samba may refer to:

- Só Danço Samba (album), a 1964 album by Clare Fischer
- Só Danço Samba (song), a bossa nova song composed in 1962 by Antônio Carlos Jobim
