= Ne Plus Ultra =

Studio album by Warne Marsh
- Released: 1970
- Recorded: September 14 & October 25, 1969
- Venue: Herrick Chapel Lounge, Occidental College, LA
- Genre: Jazz
- Length: 45:15
- Label: Revelation; REV 12
- Producer: John William Hardy

Warne Marsh chronology
Jazz from the East Village (1960)	Ne Plus Ultra (1970)	Report of the 1st Annual Symposium on Relaxed Improvisation (1972)

Ne Plus Ultra, is an album by saxophonist Warne Marsh, recorded in 1969 and released on the Revelation label in 1970 before being rereleased on CD the Swiss HatOLOGY label in 2006 with a bonus track.

== Reception ==
Professional ratings
Review scores
Source	Rating
All About Jazz	5/5 stars
AllMusic	5/5 stars
DownBeat	4.5/5 stars
The Guardian	4/5 stars
The Penguin Guide to Jazz Recordings	3/4 stars

The AllMusic review noted, "This was tenor saxophonist Warne Marsh's first recording as a leader since 1960... A strong all-around CD reissue". The Guardian's John Fordham said, "A largely unsung classic, originally released in 1969, and featuring the most purist of all the followers of Cool School guru Lennie Tristano's ascetically linear method of jazz improvising. West Coast saxophonist Warne Marsh (like all the Tristanoites) liked staying in a narrow dynamic range, but within it he could perform miracles of melodic invention and rhythmic audacity – though almost always performing the latter over a metronomically steady drummer's groove". Writing for All About Jazz, Nic Jones stated, "The passing of time has done nothing to reduce the singularity of Warne Marsh's art, and this set, recorded at the end of the 1960s, is an excellent working definition".

== Track listing ==
1. "You Stepped Out of a Dream" (Nacio Herb Brown, Gus Kahn) – 9:03
2. "Lennie's Pennies" (Lennie Tristano) – 4:21
3. "317 East 32nd Street" (Tristano) – 8:15
4. "Subconscious-Lee" (Lee Konitz) – 7:15
5. "Touch and Go" (Warne Marsh) – 15:22
6. "Bach 2 Part Invention No. 13" (Johann Sebastian Bach) – 0:59 Bonus track on CD reissue

== Personnel ==
- Warne Marsh – tenor saxophone
- Gary Foster – alto saxophone
- Dave Parlato – bass
- John Tirabasso – drums
