= Juan Carlos Paz (disambiguation) =

Juan Carlos Paz (1897–1972) was an Argentine composer and music theorist

Juan Carlos Paz may also refer to:

- Juan Carlos Paz (footballer) (born 1944), Uruguayan footballer
- Juan Carlos Paz y Puente (born 1964), Mexican musician

== See also ==
- Juan Paz (disambiguation)
- Carlos Paz (disambiguation)
