= Touch of the Rare =

Studio album by Lisa Rich
- Released: January 1986
- Recorded: June 17, 1985
- Studio: Monterey Studios, Glendale, CA
- Genre: Jazz
- Label: Trend; TR 541
- Producer: Albert Marx

Lisa Rich chronology
Listen Here (1983)	Touch of the Rare (1986)	Highwire (2019)

Touch of the Rare is an album by American jazz vocalist Lisa Rich, backed by a quartet led by pianist/composer/arranger Clare Fischer, who also wrote or co-wrote six of its 11 tracks. Released by Trend Records in 1986 as TR 541, and reissued the following year on CD, Touch of the Rare was the second album released by Rich. Her first album was Listen Here.

Professional ratings
Review scores
Source	Rating
The Los Angeles Times	3.5/5 stars

== Reception ==
Beginning with his own tongue planted firmly in cheek ("Rich sings in tongues: English, Spanish, Portuguese and vocalese"), noted freelance jazz writer and Los Angeles Times jazz critic Leonard Feather fleshes out his 3½-star capsule review as follows:

Backed by Clare Fischer's efficient keyboards and percussion-oriented quartet, she tackles fearlessly such odd melodies as the title tune and "Ornithardy," takes full advantage of Bronislau Kaper's durable "Invitation" and deals handily with "Love for Sale" converted into a long-meter Latin disguise. A thoroughly professional, jazz-influenced artist.

The Ottawa Citizen's Lois Moody elaborates:

There's a strong Latin-jazz feeling to many of the 11 tracks, with support coming from the quintet of pianist Clare Fischer, an imaginative and sensitive composer-arranger who had a hand in six of the pieces. Rich's voice is in the same mellow range and she has a similar approach to songs as Meredith D'Ambrosio and the late Irene Kral... The warm-voiced singer seems equally at home with strange interval leaps, odd harmonic twists and languid phrases. The sometimes-dry, mostly vibratoless style makes one recall the late alto saxophonist Paul Desmond... The program choices make good use of her best qualities.

== Track listing ==
1. "Touch of the Rare" (Stephen Paul Evans/June Bisantz Evans) – 3:20
2. "Invitation" (Bronislau Kaper) – 4:24
3. "Novios" (Clare Fischer/Barbara Ransom) – 5:07
4. "Minor Sights" (Clare Fischer) – 3:38
5. "Ornithardy" (Lee Lally Hughes/Clare Fischer) – 2:47
6. "Pensativa" (Clare Fischer) – 4:53
7. "Love for Sale" (Cole Porter) – 4:48
8. "Gaviota" (Weaver Copeland/Clare Fischer) – 5:38
9. "Better Than Anything" (David Wheat/Bill Loughborough) – 2:23
10. "Serenidade" (Daniel Cytrynowicz/Clare Fischer) – 3:55
11. "Some Other Time" (Leonard Bernstein/Betty Comden/Adolph Green) – 3:51

== Personnel ==
All personnel information derived from WorldCat.

- Lisa Rich - vocals
- Clare Fischer - piano, keyboards
- Brent Fischer - bass guitar
- Michito Sanchez - conga, bongos
- Walfredo Reyes - drums, percussion
- Ron Powell - percussion
