= José José (album) =

Studio album by José José
- Released: 1969 (México)
- Recorded: Mexico
- Genre: Latin pop
- Label: RCA
- Producer: Armando Manzanero / Rubén Fuentes

José José chronology
José José (1969)	La Nave Del Olvido (1970)

José José (also known as Cuidado) is the debut studio album by Mexican singer José José. It was recorded at RCA Victor in Mexico City and produced under the supervision of composers Rubén Fuentes and Armando Manzanero. It was released in 1969.

== Track listing ==
1. Sólo Una Mujer (Joaquín Prieto)
2. Una Mañana (Clare Fischer / Joaquín Prieto)
3. Se Agradecerá (Nacho González)
4. Pero te extraño (Armando Manzanero)
5. Monólogo (Chico Novarro)
6. La Amante Perfecta (Armando Manzanero)
7. Sin Ella (Nilsson-Okamura)
8. Agua Con Sal (Joaquín Prieto)
9. Lluvia En La Tarde (Arturo Castro)
10. Presiento (Nacho González)
11. Cuidado (Chico Novarro)
12. Antes (Juan Acereto)

Musical Arrangement and Accompaniment:

1,2,3,8,10,12 Orchestra by José Sabre Marroquín, Arrangement by Joaquín Prieto

4.Orchestra by Joaquín Prieto

7.Orchestra by Chucho Ferrer

9.Orchestra by Arturo Castro

5,6.Orchestra by Eduardo Magallanes
