= Carlos Paz =

Carlos Paz may refer to:

- Carlos Paz de Araújo, Brazilian American scientist
- Carlos Paz (baseball), Cuban ballplayer (See 1987 Caribbean Series)
- Carlos Salazar (Colombian footballer), (born Carlos Eduardo Salazar Paz, 1981)
- Juan Carlos Paz (1901–1972), Argentine composer
- Juan Carlos Paz y Puente (born 1964), Mexican musician and educator

== See also ==
- Juan Carlos Paz (disambiguation)
- Villa Carlos Paz, a city in the province of Córdoba, Argentina
