= Easy Livin' (Clare Fischer album) =

Studio album by Clare Fischer
- Released: 1966 (limited edition); Reissued 1968 (Reissue cover displayed above.)
- Recorded: August 8, 1963
- Genre: Jazz
- Length: 46 min
- Label: Revelation; REV-2
- Producer: John William Hardy; Jon Horwich

Clare Fischer chronology
Manteca! (1965)	Easy Livin' (1966)	Songs for Rainy Day Lovers (1967)
External audio
- You may listen to "In Your Own Sweet Way" here

Original cover
- Revelation's original 1966 limited release

Professional ratings
Review scores
Source	Rating
AllMusic	2/5 stars
Down Beat	3.5/5 stars

Easy Livin' is an album by composer/arranger/keyboardist Clare Fischer, a program of standards featuring both solo piano performances and piano-bass duets, recorded on August 8, 1963, given a limited release in 1966 (see original album cover below), and reissued in 1968 on the Revelation label.

== Track listing ==
Composer credits and durations derived from album images.

Side One

1. "In Your Own Sweet Way" (Dave Brubeck) - 4:05
2. "Glad to Be Unhappy" (Richard Rodgers & Lorenz Hart) - 2:18
3. "Aquarius" (João Donato) - 4:12
4. "My Pretty Girl" (Charles Fulcher) - 2:14
5. "Kerry Dancer" (Irish traditional) - 4:55
6. "Goodbye" (Gordon Jenkins) 5:17

Side Two

1. "I'll Take Romance" (Ben Oakland & Oscar Hammerstein II) - 11:44
2. "Easy Livin' [sic]'" (Ralph Rainger & Leo Robin) - 10:44

== Personnel ==
- Clare Fischer - piano
- Bobby West - bass (Side One, track 6; Side Two, tracks 1–2)
