= 2+2 (album) =

Studio album by Clare Fischer
- Released: February 1981
- Recorded: September 1980
- Studio: Capitol (Hollywood)
- Genre: Latin jazz
- Label: Pausa Records; PR 7086

Clare Fischer chronology
Alone Together (1980)	2+2 (1981)	Machaca (1981)
External audio
- You may listen to "Du, Du...." here

2+2 is an eponymous album of a vocal quartet called 2+2 with music by the Latin jazz ensemble known as Salsa Picante that was led by the American keyboardist/composer-arranger Clare Fischer. It was recorded in September 1980 and released in February 1981 by Pausa Records, and in Germany on the MPS label, as Foreign Exchange – The First Album. Tracks 1, 2, 3, 6 and 7 would be reissued on CD in 1999, and as a digital download in 2012, as Latin Patterns, a compilation of remastered highlights from four of Fischer's MPS LPs from this period.

The album represents a number of firsts for Fischer, including his first Grammy (specifically, the album's final track, "Guajira Pa' La Jeva", named 1981's Best Latin Recording), as well as a pair of recording debuts, first, that of 2+2, the vocal quartet with which Fischer supplemented his Latin jazz ensemble (thus tying together two key components of his wide-ranging musical universe), and, of equal if not greater import, that of his son Brent Fischer, marking the beginning of a fruitful – and more than three-decade-long – professional association.

== Reception ==
Professional ratings
Review scores
Source	Rating
Los Angeles Times	4/5 stars

Los Angeles Times jazz critic Leonard Feather awarded the album four stars, making particular note of the album's seamless blend of vocal and instrumental units:

Their blend is splendid, they are at times expertly integrated with the band through Fischer's compositions, lyrics and arrangements; and they are quadrilingual, starting in German and proceeding to English, Spanish and doo-be-doo, the Esperanto of jazz. The rhythm, generally timbales-oriented, could have used more bottom. Darlene Koldenhoven, the lead soprano, is a striking discovery.

== Track listing ==
All songs composed by Clare Fischer except where noted.

Side A

1. "Du, Du...." (trad./arr. Clare Fischer) – 5:57
2. "Legacy" – 2:35
3. "Morning" – 3:36
4. "Guajira Pa' La Jeva" (words – Jose "Perico" Hernandez, music – Poncho Sanchez and Clare Fischer) – 4:30

Side B

1. "Leavin'" – 3:25
2. "Funquiado" – 6:46
3. "Thru the Ages" – 4:21
4. "Melancolico" (words – Barbara Ransom, music – Clare Fischer) – 7:07

== Personnel ==
- Clare Fischer – leader, Fender-Rhodes electric piano, Yamaha EX-42 organ, Yamaha YC-30 combo organ
- Gary Foster – flute and soprano sax; on side A (tracks 2 & 3) and side B (tracks 1 & 3) – sopranino and alto sax, plus sopranino, soprano, alto, tenor, bass and grand bass recorders
- John Chiodini – electric guitar; on side A (tracks 2 & 3) and side B (tracks 1 & 3) – acoustic guitar and hollow-bodied electric guitar
- Poncho Sanchez – conga, bongo, campana
- Ramon Banda (only on side A, tracks 1 & 4, and side B, track 2 & 4) – clave
- Alex Acuña (only on side A, tracks 1 & 4, and side B, track 2 & 4) – timbales, percussion
- Roland Vazquez (only on side A, tracks 1 & 4, and side B, track 2 & 4) – drums
- Brent Fischer – electric bass
- Oscar Meza – string bass
- Luis Conte (only on side A, tracks 2 & 3, and side B, track 1 & 3) – timbales, percussion
- Andre Fischer (only on side A, tracks 2 & 3, and side B, track 1 & 3) – drums
- José "Perico" Hernandez – guest vocalist on A4 and B4
- Darlene Koldenhoven – lead soprano
- Mary Hylan – second soprano (sings lead on first bridge of "Morning," rock section of "Thru the Ages," and first part of "Guajira")
- Amick Byram – tenor (solo on "Leavin'")
- John Laird – baritone
