= Paul Nash (musician) =

American jazz musician

Paul Nash (February 19, 1948 – January 20, 2005) was an American jazz guitarist and composer.

== History ==
A native of the Bronx in New York City, Nash belonged to rock bands in his teens. He turned to jazz after attending a festival in 1968 which featured Sunny Murray and Archie Shepp. He received degrees from Berklee College of Music in Boston and Mills College in San Francisco. He started the Paul Nash Ensemble with Eddie Marshall and Mark Isham. Revelation released the band's first album, A Jazz Composer's Ensemble, in 1979. During the 1980s he started the Bay Area Jazz Composers Orchestra and in 1990 the Manhattan New Music Project. He died from a brain tumor in 2005.

== Discography ==
- A Jazz Composer's Ensemble (Revelation, 1979)
- Second Impression (Soul Note, 1985)
- Night Language (Musical Heritage Society, 1987)
- Mood Swing (Soul Note, 1993)
- The Soul of Grace (Soul Note, 2000)
