= Introspectivo =

Studio album by Clare Fischer
- Released: October 14, 2005
- Recorded: December 11–12, 2004
- Genre: Jazz
- Length: 73:55
- Label: M&L Music
- Producer: Brent Fischer, Juan Carlos Paz y Puente, & Eugenio Toussaint

Clare Fischer chronology
Bert van den Brink invites Clare Fischer (2000)	Introspectivo (2005)	A Family Affair (2006)
External audio
- You may listen to "A Wish Come True" here

Professional ratings
Review scores
Source	Rating
Jazz Improv Magazine	4/5 stars

Introspectivo is a studio album by American composer/arranger/pianist Clare Fischer, recorded in December 2004 and released in October 2005 on the Mexican label, M&L Music. Composed largely of previously unrecorded original compositions unearthed by his son Brent, this would be the 76-year-old Fischer's fifth and final strictly solo piano recording.

== Track listing ==
All compositions by Clare Fischer except where indicated.

1. "Song for Eugenio" – 6:15
2. "Quiet Reflections" – 2:50
3. "Western Airlines" – 2:53
4. "Love's Walk" – 5:41
5. "Sleep Sweet Child" – 1:18
6. Ellington Medley ("Sentimental Lady" – Duke Ellington, "Daydream" – Billy Strayhorn, "Satin Doll" – Johnny Mercer, B. Strayhorn, D. Ellington) – 6:40
7. "Elegy" – 3:03
8. "A Wish Come True" – 1:03
9. "Warmeland" (Swedish traditional) – 4:42
10. "Marcella" – 2:00
11. "Bells" – 3:30
12. "Silenciosa" (Mario Ruiz Armengol) – 1:44
13. "House on Summit/Children at Play" – 3:45
14. "Vanessa" – 1:50
15. "Eternally Yours" – 3:52
16. "Soñe" (Mario Ruiz Armengol) – 1:38
17. "Barboleta" – 3:30
18. "Waiting for Jack's Plane" – 1:31
19. "All the Things You Are" (Jerome Kern, Oscar Hammerstein) – 3:35
20. "Donna Lee" (Charlie Parker, Phil Woods [sic]) – 0:38
21. "Ice Crystals" – 3:17
22. "Don't Ever Leave" – 1:40
23. "Coming Home" – 1:52
24. "Fairyland" (Glen Hurlbut, Bob Thompson and Bill Baldwin) – 4:57

== Personnel ==
- Clare Fischer – piano
