= Songs for Rainy Day Lovers =

Studio album by Clare Fischer
- Released: 1967; reissued 1978 as America the Beautiful; reissued 2002 (together with Extension) on CD as America the Beautiful
- Recorded: August 16, 1966; Los Angeles, California
- Genre: Jazz
- Length: 33 min
- Label: Columbia (CL 2691 / CS 9491); Discovery (Discovery 786); Clare Fischer Productions/CD Baby (CFP-05756252)
- Producer: Albert Marx

Clare Fischer chronology
Easy Livin' (1966)	Songs for Rainy Day Lovers (1967)	One to Get Ready, Four to Go (1968)
External audio
- You may listen to "America the Beautiful" here

Professional ratings
Review scores
Source	Rating
AllMusic	2/5 stars
Billboard	"Special Merit Pick"
Boston Globe	favorable
Down Beat	5/5 stars

Songs for Rainy Day Lovers is an album by American keyboardist/composer-arranger Clare Fischer, recorded in August 1966 and released in September 1967 by Columbia Records. It would be reissued in 1978 on the Discovery label as America the Beautiful, and in 2002 on CD (together with the 1963 album Extension) under the same name by Clare Fischer Productions.

Having provided his distinctive string backgrounds for albums by several artists over the previous decade, including Donald Byrd, Cal Tjader, and the Hi-Lo's, the 37-year-old Fischer finally had an opportunity to provide the same service for himself, as a string orchestra and rhythm section combine to support the leader as featured piano soloist.

== Reception ==
As this generally favorable Boston Globe review makes clear, despite having moved up to a major label for this slickly packaged LP, Fischer was once again in virtually the same position he'd been in almost a decade before (with the Hi-Lo's, and then Dizzy Gillespie), with his arrangements again uncredited. With some difficulty, the Globe's William Buchanan manages to piece together Fischer's identity, if not with absolute certainty his job description:

A batch of new Columbia albums has included a "sleeper" LP by a pianist named Clare Fischer. When I saw the album cover I said, "Clare who?" The picture on the cover did not help in identifying him. Leonard Feather's liner notes were most helpful and while I had never heard of Clare Fischer, I was, without knowing it, familiar with his work, because for many years he was the musical director for the Hi-Lo's, a superior vocal quartet.

Complementing Fischer's work here is an orchestra working with superb arrangements, probably Fischer's. While the album could be classified as jazz, it's conservative and should have wide appeal.

While acknowledging its 'conservative' or mood music trappings, Down Beat's Pete Welding sees the album as not only meeting but easily transcending those generic expectations:

Fischer's orchestrations do not so much exhaust the possibilities of the genre as they delineate the full richness of its possibilities. [...] His string writing is a revelation. [...] There is none of the syrupy insipidity that has marked much writing for strings behind jazz soloists thus far. [... Fischer's strings] are perfectly integrated into his orchestrations on a footing fully equal to every other element involved.

Citing one of the recording's participants, Welding informs us that, following the first run-through of Fischer's "Sleep Sweet Child," "the string players stood up and to a man applauded Fischer." For his part, Welding also praises Fischer, the performer:

And, man, does Fischer play! His solos, which are fully interactive with the orchestrations, are models of grace, economy, and lyricism of the highest order, flashing in and out of the texture of the orchestrations with a quicksilver fluidity and a coursing force that is always perfectly allied with perfect lucidity.

== Track listing ==
Side One

1. "On a Clear Day You Can See Forever" (A. J. Lerner – B. Lane) – 2:32
2. "A Time For Love" (P.F. Webster – J. Mandel) – 3:17
3. "I Remember Spring" (Clare Fischer) – 3:50
4. "America the Beautiful" – 2:31
5. "I'm Beginning to See the Light" (H. James – D. Ellington – J. Hodges – D. George) – 2:48

Side Two

1. "Look At That Face" (L. Bricusse – A. Newley) – 2:53
2. "When Autumn Comes" (Clare Fischer) – 3:46
3. "Sleep Sweet Child" (Clare Fischer) – 3:04
4. "Opener" (Clare Fischer) – 2:44
5. "Here's That Rainy Day" (J. Burke – J. Van Heusen) – 2:25
6. "The Shadow of Your Smile" (P. F. Webster – J. Mandel) – 2:30

== Personnel ==
All personnel information derived from Leonard Feather's liner notes.

- Clare Fischer – nine-foot Steinway piano
- Vince Terri – guitar
- Bob West – bass
- Larry Bunker (side 1) or Nick Martinis (side 2) – drums
- Gil Falco – trombone (side 1)
- French horn, uncredited (side 2)
- John Lowe, plus two additional woodwinds, uncredited
- Gerald Vinci, plus four additional violins, uncredited
- Six violas, uncredited
- Four celli, uncredited
- John Lowe – piccolo soloist on "Sleep Sweet Child"
- Gerald Vinci – violin soloist on "When Autumn Comes"
