= Salsa Picante =

Studio album by Clare Fischer
- Released: 1979 – German release 1980 – US release
- Recorded: January 30, 1978
- Studio: Capitol (Hollywood)
- Genre: Latin jazz
- Length: 39:54
- Label: MPS; MPS – 5C 064-62086; Trend/Discovery; DS-817
- Producer: Clare Fischer

Clare Fischer chronology
Duality (1980)	Salsa Picante (1979)	Alone Together (1980)
External audio
- You may listen to "Bachi" here

Salsa Picante is an album by American composer-arranger/keyboardist Clare Fischer, recorded on January 30, 1978, and marking the eponymous recording debut of Fischer's Latin jazz combo. (Note: While some version or other of this unit – with or without supplementary vocal ensemble – would continue to perform and record, albeit with decreasing frequency, right up to the 2011 release, And Sometimes Instruments, the Salsa Picante moniker was dropped after 1985's Crazy Bird.) Initially released in 1979 by MPS Records in Germany, the album's U.S. release came the following year on the Trend/Discovery label. Though long unavailable on CD, four of its tracks made it onto MPS's 1998 anthology of Fischer highlights, Latin Patterns, and the album in its entirety was finally reissued on CD in 2007 by Clare Fischer Productions.

== Track listing ==
All selections composed by Clare Fischer except where noted.

Side One

1. "Bachi" – 6:27
2. "Morning" – 5:55
3. "Guarabe" – 10:17

Side Two

1. "Descarga – Yéma Ya" (Clare Fischer/Ildefonso (Poncho) Sanchez) - 6:15
2. "Cosmic Flight" – 3:11
3. "Inquiétação" (Ary Barroso) – 3:47
4. "Minor Sights – 4:02

== Personnel ==
- Clare Fischer – e-piano, Yamaha EX-42 organ
- Rick Zunigar – guitar
- David Acuña – flute
- David Troncoso – e-bass
- Pete Riso – drums
- Alex Acuña – timbales, Latin percussion
- Ildefonso (Poncho) Sanchez – conga, bongos, campana
