= Bert van den Brink Invites Clare Fischer =

Live album by Clare Fischer
- Released: October 2, 2001
- Genre: Jazz
- Length: 67:20
- Label: Challenge

Clare Fischer chronology
Symbiosis (1999)	Bert van den Brink Invites Clare Fischer (2001)	Introspectivo (2005)
External audio
- You may listen to "Morning" here on YouTube

Professional ratings
Review scores
Source	Rating
AllMusic	4.5/5 stars

Bert van den Brink Invites Clare Fischer is a live album featuring the impromptu Dutch/American piano duo of Bert van den Brink and Clare Fischer, released in October 2001 on the Dutch Challenge label.

== Reception ==
Allmusic awarded the album 4½ stars, with reviewer Judith Schlesinger applauding the players' resourcefulness:

Due to a minor road mishap, there was no time for rehearsal or even a definitive set list -- but with musicians of this caliber, this is more opportunity than disadvantage. The result is an extraordinary evening of musical spontaneity, fellowship, and wit, which is even more remarkable because van den Brink is totally blind, and visual cues were impossible... You can hear the delight of discovery in the players' comments, the general laughter, and -- above all -- in the music.

== Track listing ==
1. "Hoaky Blues" (Clare Fischer) – 5:43
2. "Improvisation on: Eine Kleine Nacht Music/Dance of the Flutes/Silent Movie Chase Music/In the Hall of the Mountain King" (Wolfgang Amadeus Mozart / Pyotr Il'yich Tchaikovsky / Edvard Grieg) – 4:59
3. "Smoke Gets In Your Eyes"/"Memories of You" (Jerome Kern-Otto Harbach / Eubie Blake-Andy Razaf) – 12:30
4. "Morning" (Clare Fischer) – 6:17
5. "Donna Lee" (Charlie Parker [sic]) – 2:58
6. "Hommage À Francis Paudràs" (Clare Fischer) – 3:02
7. "Woody 'N You" (Dizzy Gillespie) – 5:42
8. "Yesterdays" (J. Kern, O. Harbach) – 8:32
9. "Woods" (Bert van den Brink) – 4:19
10. "Lennie's Pennies"/"Pennies from Heaven" (Lennie Tristano / Arthur Johnston-Johnny Burke) – 8:23
11. "Chop Sticks" (Arthur de Lulli) – 4:55

== Personnel ==
- Bert van den Brink - piano
- Clare Fischer - piano
