= One to Get Ready, Four to Go =

Studio album by Clare Fischer
- Released: 1968
- Recorded: November 2, 1963; March 1964; Spring 1965
- Genre: Jazz
- Length: 40 min
- Label: Revelation; REV-6
- Producer: Jon Horwich

Clare Fischer chronology
Songs for Rainy Day Lovers (1967)	One to Get Ready, Four to Go (1968)	Thesaurus (1969)

Professional ratings
Review scores
Source	Rating
Allmusic	2/5 stars

One to Get Ready, Four to Go is an album by the composer, arranger and keyboardist Clare Fischer, a program of standards and originals including both solo piano and quartet performances, recorded between 1963 and 1965 and released in 1968 on the Revelation label. Each of the album's sides concludes with one of the quartet tracks, both of which were recorded on November 2, 1963; three of the four solo piano tracks were recorded in March 1964, with Liz Anne (composed by Fischer's longtime colleague Cal Tjader) added in the spring of 1965.

== Track listing ==
Composer credits and durations derived from album images.

Side 1

1. "Liz Anne" (Cal Tjader) – 5:30
2. "In Memoriam: J.F.K. and R.F.K." (Clare Fischer) – 1:59
3. "You Stepped Out of a Dream" (Kahn and Brown) – 2:32
4. "Lover Man" (Jimmy Davis, R. Ramirez, Jimmy Sherman) – 9:24

Side 2

1. "Lover Man" – 4:27
2. "Free Ways" (Traditional) – 16:27

== Personnel ==
- Clare Fischer – piano

On Side 1, track 4 and Side 2, track 2, add:

- Gary Foster – tenor saxophone
- Bobby West – bass
- Jim Keltner – drums
