= Report of the 1st Annual Symposium on Relaxed Improvisation =

Studio album by Warne Marsh, Clare Fischer & Gary Foster
- Released: 1973
- Recorded: May 9, 1972
- Studio: Clare Fischer's Studio, Van Nuys, CA
- Genre: Jazz
- Length: 37:00
- Label: Revelation; REV 17
- Producer: John William Hardy, Jon Horwich

Warne Marsh chronology
Ne Plus Ultra (1969)	Report of the 1st Annual Symposium on Relaxed Improvisation (1973)	Warne Marsh Quintet: Jazz Exchange Vol. 1 (1975)

Clare Fischer chronology
Tell It Like It Is (1972)	Report of the 1st Annual Symposium on Relaxed Improvisation (1972)	Music Inspired by the Kinetic Sculpture of Don Conard Mobiles (1975)

Report of the 1st Annual Symposium on Relaxed Improvisation, is an album by saxophonists Warne Marsh and Gary Foster with pianist Clare Fischer recorded in 1972 and released on the Revelation label.

== Reception ==
Professional ratings
Review scores
Source	Rating
Allmusic	2.5/5 stars

The Allmusic review noted "This LP certainly has an odd name. The music is relaxed but not sleepy ... this was really a recorded jam session in which no one paid much attention to the presence of the microphones. The recording quality is ok, if not state of the art, and the playing is not flawless, but the music overall is creative and well worthy of a listen by Warne Marsh fans".

== Track listing ==
1. "It Could Happen to You" (Jimmy Van Heusen, Johnny Burke) – 8:00
2. "Bluesy Rouge" (Warne Marsh, Clare Fischer, Gary Foster) – 10:00
3. "In a Mellow Tone" (Duke Ellington) – 11:00
4. "Yesterdays" (Jerome Kern, Otto Harbach) – 8:00

== Personnel ==
- Warne Marsh – tenor saxophone
- Clare Fischer – piano
- Gary Foster – alto saxophone
- Paul Ruhland – bass
- John Tirabasso – drums
