= Juan Paz =

Juan Paz may refer to:

- Juan Miguel Paz (born 1966), Colombian fencer
- Juan Bautista Paz (1772–1844), Argentine jurist and lawyer
- Juan Carlos Paz (1901–1972), Argentine composer and music theorist
- Juan José Paz (born 1980), Bolivian judoka
- Juan Pablo Paz (born 1959), Argentine physicist
- Juan Pablo Paz (tennis) (born 1995), Argentine tennis player

== See also ==
- Juan Carlos Paz (disambiguation)
