= The State of His Art =

Studio album by Clare Fischer
- Released: 1976
- Recorded: May 1973
- Genre: Jazz
- Length: 46:02
- Label: Revelation; Revelation 26
- Producer: John William Hardy

Clare Fischer chronology
Music Inspired by the Kinetic; Sculpture of Don Conard; Mobiles (1975)	The State of His Art (1976)	Clare Declares (1977)
External audio
- You may listen to "Someday My Prince Will Come" here

Professional ratings
Review scores
Source	Rating
AllMusic	3/5 stars
Jazz: The Rough Guide	favorable

The State of His Art is a studio album by American composer/arranger/pianist Clare Fischer, recorded May 1973 and released in 1976 by Revelation Records, and on CD by Clare Fischer Productions in 2007. This is the first of five strictly solo piano recordings Fischer would make during his career. (Note: This includes neither a hybrid such as Clare Fischer Plays By and With Himself (with several tracks featuring Fischer accompanying himself via multi-tracking) nor numerous small ensemble albums, each of which incorporate one or more solo piano tracks. Moreover, Fischer released five additional unaccompanied LPs, all during the 1970s, three featuring organ, and two, an assortment of keyboard instruments.)

== Track listing ==
All compositions by Clare Fischer except where indicated.

1. "The Duke"
2. "Someday My Prince Will Come" (Frank Churchill-Larry Morey)
3. "Woody N' You" (Dizzy Gillespie)
4. "Free Improvisation"
5. "Basic Blues"
6. "Proto-Blues"
7. "Phrygian Blues"
8. "Out-of-Tempo Blues"

== Personnel ==
- Clare Fischer - piano
