= Clare Declares =

Studio album by Clare Fischer
- Released: 1977
- Recorded: October 1975 at Meersburg (Lake of Constance)
- Genre: Jazz
- Label: MPS
- Producer: Hans-Georg Brunner-Schwer

Clare Fischer chronology
The State of His Art (1976)	Clare Declares (1977)	Jazz Song (1978)
External audio
- You may listen to excerpts from "Jazz Toccata in C Minor," "Autumn Leaves," and "I'll Take Romance" here

Clare Declares is an album by keyboardist/composer-arranger Clare Fischer, released in 1977 on the MPS label. It features unaccompanied performances on an Austrian-made Rieger pipe organ, with liner notes provided by jazz critic and lyricist Gene Lees.

== Track listing ==
Side One

1. "Jazz Toccata in C Minor" Clare Fischer) - 6:57
2. "If" (David Gates) - 4:18
3. "Autumn Leaves" (Kosma) - 7:17

Side Two

1. "I'll Take Romance" (Oakland) - 6:30
2. "Cherokee" (Ray Noble) - 10:41

== Personnel ==
- Clare Fischer - pipe organ
