= Jerry Coker =

American jazz saxophonist (1932–2024)

Background information
- Born: November 28, 1932; South Bend, Indiana, U.S.
- Died: January 14, 2024 (aged 91)
- Genres: Jazz
- Occupations: Musician, composer, arranger, educator, author
- Instruments: Tenor saxophone, woodwinds
- Years active: 1953–2000s

Jerry Coker (November 28, 1932 – January 14, 2024) was an American jazz saxophonist and pedagogue.

Coker was born in South Bend, Indiana. He attended Indiana University in the early 1950s, but interrupted his studies in 1953 when Woody Herman offered him a job in "The Herd". Coker eventually earned undergraduate and graduate degrees while he taught jazz at Sam Houston State University (then Sam Houston State Teachers College). He recorded under his own name in the mid-1950s and as a sideman with Nat Pierce, Dick Collins, and Mel Lewis; later that decade he played with Stan Kenton.

In 1960 Coker began teaching and increasingly turned to music education and composition. He taught at Duke University, University of Miami (where he created one of the first jazz degree programs in the country at the Frost School of Music), North Texas State University, and started the Studio Music and Jazz program at the University of Tennessee, where he was a professor of music from the 1980s through the 2000s. Notable students include Randy Brecker and Pat Metheny. Coker and his colleagues Jamey Aebersold and David Baker have been called the "ABCs" of jazz education, and in 1994 Coker was inducted into the Jazz Educators Hall of Fame.

Coker died on January 14, 2024, at the age of 91.

== Pedagogue style ==
Coker has emphasised the aims of The Jazz Idiom as establishing an outline of subjects for the self study of jazz and has noted the similarities of all non-classical western music in the lack of integration into formal education circles. Viewing the study of jazz as requiring well-roundedness and practiced familiarity, Coker's recommends open ended explorations by a student in fields of jazz history, familiarity with their instrument, jazz keyboard, and jazz musical theory, often interrelating the contents of his books.

== Discography ==
- Modern Music from Indiana University (Fantasy Records, 1956)
- Intro to Jazz, with the Rudy Salvini Big Band (Jazz Records, 1957)
- Extension, with the Clare Fischer Orchestra (Discovery Records, 1984)
- ...A Re-Emergence, with the Frank Sullivan Trio (Revelation, 1984)
- Rebirth (Revelation, 1987)

== Bibliography ==
- Improvising Jazz (1964/ rev. ed. 1986)
- Patterns for Jazz (c1970)
- The Jazz Idiom (1975)
- Listening to Jazz (c1978; rev. as How to Listen to Jazz, n.p., n.d.)
- The Complete Method for Improvisation (c1980)
- Jerry Coker’s Jazz Keyboard (c1984)
- The Teaching of Jazz (1989)
- How to Practice Jazz (c1990)
- Elements of the Jazz Language for the Developing Improviser (1991)
- The Jazz Age In America (2020)
