= Toledo Jazz Orchestra =

American musical ensemble

The Toledo Jazz Orchestra is a musical ensemble based in Toledo, Ohio. The ensemble is a traditional big band, generally featuring between ten and twenty performers, depending on the instrumentation called for in a given piece or seasonal roster.

Performances have included work with a number of well-known jazz artists, including Stan Kenton Orchestra drummer Peter Erskine.

The TJO started in the 1980s, according to the obituary of former director David Melle. In the first decade of the 21st century, the group split from the similarly named Toledo Jazz Society (renamed the Art Tatum Jazz Heritage Society), then went dormant for two years before a re-emergence in 2010 as an 18-piece ensemble. The group now exists as an independent nonprofit organization. Membership is largely made up of area performing professionals and music faculty of regional universities, including (as of 2013) a winner of the prestigious International Trumpet Guild solo competition award.
