= Extension (Clare Fischer album) =

Studio album by Clare Fischer
- Released: 1963
- Recorded: 1963 at Pacific Jazz Studios
- Genre: Jazz
- Label: Pacific Jazz; PJ 77
- Producer: Richard Bock

Clare Fischer chronology
Surging Ahead (1963)	Extension (1963)	Só Danço Samba (1964)
External audio
- You may listen to "Quiet Dawn" here

Professional ratings
Review scores
Source	Rating
All About Jazz	favorable
AllMusic	4.5/5 stars
JazzWax	favorable

Extension is the third album by composer/arranger/keyboardist Clare Fischer, and his first for big band, recorded and released in 1963 on the Pacific Jazz label, reissued on CD (together with the 1967 LP, Songs for Rainy Day Lovers) in 2002 as America the Beautiful, and, under its original name, in 2012.

According to Ed Beach, disk jockey of the WRVR 106.7 FM New York radio program “Just Jazz,” on this album, all of the solos, except for those of Clare Fischer and tenor saxophonist Jerry Coker, were written out (by Fischer), not improvised.

== Reception ==
Reviewing the 2012 CD reissue for All About Jazz, Troy Collins calls Extension Fischer's "masterpiece," representing "a majestic culmination of his concepts, drawing upon myriad influences, including rich Ellingtonian voicings, the angular harmonic intervals of bebop, and bold modernist innovations proffered by classical composers such as Béla Bartók and Dmitri Shostakovich." Expanding on this notion, Collins continues:

Counter to the norms of the time, these meticulously scored big-band charts are light on extended improvisation—but intentionally so—as Fischer considered the relationship between composition and arrangement equally important. Maintaining thematic control as primary soloist, Fischer proves to be a concise, yet original interpreter, demonstrated by his adroit pianism on the impressionistic tone poem "Quiet Dawn." His kaleidoscopic Hammond organ work, revealed elsewhere on the record, is equally colorful.

Alternating with the leader for the spotlight is tenor saxophonist Jerry Coker... Together Fischer and Coker accentuate the date's prismatic colors and variegated moods, which are by turns charmingly old fashioned, like the breezy "Ornithardy," or subversively modern, such as the jaunty "Igor," dedicated to Stravinsky. As part of the same continuum that includes Gil Evans, Stan Kenton and Gary McFarland, Fischer reveals a distinctive and unique compositional style. Accessible and sophisticated, Extension is a welcome reissue that will entertain and engage curious listeners on multiple levels.

== Track listing ==
All compositions by Clare Fischer.

1. "Ornithardy" - 3:29
2. "Quiet Dawn" - 4:36
3. "Bittersweet" - 3:43
4. "Igor" - 3:23
5. "Extension" - 6:32
6. "Solette" - 1:08
7. "Passacaglia" - 3:16
8. "Canto Africano" - 3:54

== Personnel ==
=== Ornithardy, Extension, Soloette / Passacaglia ===
- Bud Shank - flute, alto saxophone
- Don Shelton - alto saxophone, clarinet
- Jerry Coker - tenor saxophone
- Gary Foster - tenor saxophone, clarinet
- John Lowe - E-flat contrabass clarinet, baritone saxophone, clarinet, piccolo
- Vincent DeRosa - 1st horn
- Richard Perissi - 2nd horn
- Fred Teuber - 3rd horn
- Gil Falco - tenor trombone
- Bob Knight - bass trombone
- Tommy Johnson - tuba
- Clare Fischer - piano, organ, alto saxophone
- Bob West - bass
- Larry Bunker - drums

=== Quiet Dawn, Bittersweet, Igor, Canto Africano ===
- John Lowe - 1st flute, alto flute, piccolo
- Sam Most - 2nd flute, alto flute, piccolo
- Don Shelton - E-flat clarinet, alto saxophone
- Louis Ciotti - clarinet
- Ben Kantor - clarinet
- Gary Foster - alto clarinet, tenor saxophone
- Jerry Coker - bass clarinet
- Jack Nimitz - E-flat contrabass clarinet, baritone saxophone
- Vincent DeRosa - 1st horn
- Richard Perissi - 2nd horn
- Fred Teuber - 3rd horn
- Gil Falco - tenor trombone
- Bob Knight - bass trombone
- Tommy Johnson - tuba
- Larry Bunker - vibraphone
- Clare Fischer - piano, organ, lujon
- Bob West - bass
- Colin Bailey - drums
