= Mario Ruiz Armengol =

Mexican musician

- Born: Mario Ruiz Armengol; March 17, 1914; Veracruz, Mexico
- Died: December 22, 2002 (aged 88); Quintana Roo, Mexico
- Other name: Mayito
- Occupations: Composer, musician, arranger, music teacher
- Style: Piano (classic, bolero)
- Website: www.mruizarmengol.com

Mario Ruiz Armengol (known as "Mayito" or "Mister Harmony") (March 14, 1914 in Veracruz, Mexico – December 22, 2002 in Cancun, Mexico), was a Mexican pianist, composer, arranger, conductor and music teacher. He was the son of pianist and conductor Ismael Ruiz Suárez and Rosa Armengol.

== Early life and career ==
Ruiz Armengol started to play piano at eight years old and debuted as a conductor at fifteen, along with Leopoldo Beristaín. At sixteen years old Ruiz Armengol was one of the founding members of the XEW-AM (a legendary Mexican radio broadcaster) music band.

He studied with José Rolón, Rodolfo Halffter and Joaquín Amparán, and in 1942 met Mexican composer Manuel M. Ponce with whom he started a close friendship. By 1954 he was nicknamed "Mr. Harmony" by American musicians such as Duke Ellington, Billy May and Clare Fischer.

Ruiz Armengol became very famous for his boleros. He also wrote more than 31 children's songs, 19 Cuban dances, 16 studies, 16 reflections, 32 miniatures, 5 waltzes, scherzos, minuets, sonatas, fantasies, preludes and piano works for four hands, chamber music for piano and violin, violoncello, harp and flute. He was a highly reputed Mexican musician, a master of harmony and classical piano compositions.
