= First Time Out (album) =

Studio album by Clare Fischer
- Released: 1962
- Recorded: April 12 & 14, 1962
- Studio: Pacific Jazz Studios, Hollywood
- Genre: Jazz
- Label: Pacific Jazz; PJ 52
- Producer: Richard Bock

Clare Fischer chronology
First Time Out (1962)	Bossa Nova Jazz Samba (1962)
External audio
- You may listen to "Toddler" here

Professional ratings
Review scores
Source	Rating
AllMusic	3/5 stars
Atlanta Daily World	favorable
Audio	favorable
Down Beat	5/5 stars
Gramophone	"superlative"
Mademoiselle	favorable
Saturday Review	favorable

First Time Out is the debut album by American composer/arranger/keyboardist Clare Fischer, (Note: Fischer actually recorded an album prior to this, the previous year, while in Mexico with the Hi-Lo's, but it was not released until later, and with little fanfare even then.) recorded and released in 1962 by Pacific Jazz Records.

== Reception ==
Aside from the overwhelmingly positive response that greeted Fischer's debut, the most pervasive reaction was sheer surprise; indeed, Down Beat's 5-star review dubbed it "the biggest surprise of the year." As jazz historian and critic Martin Williams observes, writing in The Saturday Review:

First Time Out is from a rather unexpected source: it is a recital by a piano trio, led by Clare Fischer, a man previously known for his arranging and composing. Fischer's piano is not 'interesting,' as an arranger's piano is apt to be. It is much more accomplished than that."

While struggling to pinpoint Fischer's pianistic forebears, finding elements of both Bill Evans and Dodo Marmarosa, critic Leonard Feather echoes Williams' essential point, noting Fischer's "complete command of the keyboard; unlike Gil Evans, Tadd Dameron, and other arrangers who are secondarily pianists, he can be judged entirely by a pianistic yardstick."

Gramophone's review praises "this superlative album," in part for preventing Fischer from "becoming one of the most neglected figures in jazz." The Atlanta Daily World's Albert Anderson stops short of such hyperbole, but does acknowledge his own surprise:

I knew well before reviewing this record that Fischer was a composer of note. What I didn't know, though, was that he is such an outstanding pianist. However, after listening to these tracks (five of which are Fischer originals), I was tremendously impressed by his facility with a tune – He plays with mastery, melody and perhaps, too, with his audience in mind. The latter is suggested clearly in shifting moods and tempos; there is never a dull moment.

== Track listing ==
All compositions by Clare Fischer except where noted.

Side 1

1. "Nigerian Walk" (Ed Shaughnessy) – 7:02
2. "Toddler" – 4:40
3. "Stranger" (Gary Peacock) – 4:00
4. "Afterfact" – 4:06

Side 2

1. "Free Too Long" – 7:30
2. "Piece for Scotty" – 3:13
3. "Blues for Home" – 5:09
4. "I Love You" (Cole Porter) – 5:13

== Personnel ==
- Clare Fischer – piano
- Gary Peacock – bass
- Gene Stone – drums
