= Blue Spirits =

Studio album by Freddie Hubbard
- Released: Mid February 1967
- Recorded: February 19 & 26, 1965; March 5, 1966
- Studios: Van Gelder, Englewood Cliffs, NJ
- Genre: Jazz
- Length: 44:35 original LP; 62:04CD reissue
- Labels: Blue Note; BST 84196
- Producer: Alfred Lion

Freddie Hubbard chronology
Breaking Point (1964)	Blue Spirits (1967)	The Night of the Cookers (1965)

Blue Spirits is an album by trumpeter Freddie Hubbard released on the Blue Note label. It would be his last studio album for Blue Note, recorded in the 1960s. It features performances by Hubbard, James Spaulding, Joe Henderson, Harold Mabern Jr., Larry Ridley, Clifford Jarvis, Big Black, Kiane Zawadi, Hank Mobley, McCoy Tyner, Bob Cranshaw, Pete LaRoca. The CD release added tracks from a 1966 session featuring Hosea Taylor, Herbie Hancock, Reggie Workman, and Elvin Jones.

== Reception ==
Professional ratings
Review scores
Source	Rating
AllMusic	4/5 stars
DownBeat	4/5 stars
The Rolling Stone Jazz Record Guide	1/5 stars
The Penguin Guide to Jazz Recordings	3/4 stars

AllMusic reviewer Scott Yanow stated: "The set is comprised of seven diverse Hubbard originals and, even though none of the songs caught on to become standards, the music is quite challenging and fairly memorable." As stated in the liner notes, "The use of a fourth horn for this album, coupled with an exclusive focus on Hubbard's compositions, really threw light on the trumpeter's command of harmony, which is such a critical part of both his improvising and writing personality". Hubbard's playing here is among his best, and this album "is arguably the best recorded example of the Hubbard/James Spaulding partnership" which had been ongoing for the previous two years.

== Track listing ==
All compositions by Freddie Hubbard

1. "Soul Surge" - 10:24
2. "Blue Spirits" - 12:14
3. "Outer Forces" - 9:35
4. "Cunga Black" - 5:15
5. "Jodo" - 7:07
6. "The Melting Pot" - 7:36 Bonus track on CD
7. "True Colors" - 9:53 Bonus track on CD

Recorded on February 19, 1965 (#1, 4), February 26, 1965 (#2, 3, 5) and March 5, 1966 (#6–7).

== Personnel ==
Tracks 1, 4

- Freddie Hubbard - trumpet
- James Spaulding - alto saxophone (1), flute (4).
- Joe Henderson - tenor saxophone
- Harold Mabern - piano
- Larry Ridley - bass
- Clifford Jarvis - drums
- Big Black - congas
- Kiane Zawadi - euphonium

Tracks 2–3, 5

- Freddie Hubbard - trumpet
- Hank Mobley - tenor saxophone
- James Spaulding - alto saxophone (3 & 5), flute (2).
- McCoy Tyner - piano
- Bob Cranshaw - bass
- Pete LaRoca - drums
- Kiane Zawadi - euphonium

Tracks 6–7

- Freddie Hubbard - trumpet
- Joe Henderson - tenor saxophone
- Hosea Taylor - alto saxophone (6), bassoon (7).
- Herbie Hancock - piano (6), harpsichord (7).
- Reggie Workman - bass
- Elvin Jones - drums

== Notes ==
On the CD reissue of Blue Spirits, track 7 is listed as Hancock performing on the celeste, although it sounds like a harpsichord.

== Charts ==
Chart performance for Blue Spirits
Chart (2023)	Peak position
UK Jazz & Blues Albums (Official Charts)	2
US Top Album Sales (Billboard)	85
US Top Jazz Albums (Billboard)	8
