= Manteca! =

Studio album by Clare Fischer
- Released: November 1965
- Genre: Latin jazz
- Label: Pacific Jazz; PJ-10096, ST-20096
- Producer: Richard Bock

Clare Fischer chronology
So Danço Samba (1964)	Manteca! (1965)	Easy Livin' (1966)
External audio
- You may listen to "Dulzura" here

Professional ratings
Review scores
Source	Rating
AllMusic	3/5 stars

Manteca! is an album by composer/arranger/keyboardist Clare Fischer, released in November 1965 on the Pacific Jazz label. Following his previous album, So Danço Samba, devoted primarily to the music of Antonio Carlos Jobim, and to the bossa nova in general, with this, his first devoted to Afro-Cuban jazz (even reinterpreting one of Jobim's compositions accordingly). Fischer also used the occasion to unveil what would become his second bona fide jazz standard, Morning.

== Track listing ==
Side One

1. "Manteca" (W.G. Fuller-J. Gillespie) - 3:40
2. "El Toro" (Mongo Santamaria) - 3:31
3. "Morning" (Clare Fischer) - 4:05
4. "Afro Blue" (Mongo Santamaria) - 3:30

Side Two

1. "Favela" (O Morro) (Antonio Carlos Jobim) - 4:10
2. "Marguerite (Suegra)" (Clare Fischer) - 2:28
3. "Dulzura" (Clare Fischer) - 3:12
4. "Sway" (Pablo Beltran Ruiz) - 2:45
5. "Negrita" (Rudy Calzado) - 3:13

== Personnel ==
Side One

- Clare Fischer - organ
- Conte Candoli, Bobby Bryant, Don Smith, and A.D. Brisbois - trumpet
- Gil Falco and Bob Edmondson - trombone
- Ernie Tack - bass trombone
- Ralph Peña - bass
- Nicholas "Cuco" Martinez - timbales
- Adolfo "Chino" Valdes and Carlos Vidal - conga
- Rudy Calzado - cencero and güiro

Side Two

- Clare Fischer - piano
- Richard West - bass
- Nicholas "Cuco" Martinez - timbales
- Adolfo "Chino" Valdes and Carlos Vidal - conga
- Rudy Calzado - cencero and güiro
