= Thesaurus (album) =

Studio album by Clare Fischer
- Released: 1969
- Recorded: August 16 and 17, 1968 at T.T.G. Studios
- Genre: Jazz
- Length: 40 min
- Label: Atlantic; SD 1520
- Producer: Albert Marx

Clare Fischer chronology
One to Get Ready, Four to Go (1968)	Thesaurus (1969)	Great White Hope! (and his Japanese friend) (1970)

Professional ratings
Review scores
Source	Rating
AllMusic	3/5 stars
Cash Box	favorable
Coda	favorable
High Fidelity	favorable
The New York Times	favorable

Thesaurus is an album by American composer/arranger/pianist Clare Fischer, recorded and released in 1969 by Atlantic Records. Reissued in 1979 as 'Twas Only Yesterday by Discovery Records, and on CD, again by Discovery, in 1988 as part of a CD entitled Waltz, encompassing both Thesaurus and the 1980 LP, Duality. In 2000, Thesaurus received a dedicated CD reissue under its original title from Koch Records.

== Reception ==
Ken Dryden reviewed Thesaurus for Allmusic and wrote: "Fischer's potent originals and first-rate arrangements bring out the best in his musicians...A well-conceived chart of Billy Strayhorn's 'Upper Manhattan Medical Group' swings mightily. The leader even makes a rare appearance on alto sax in the brief 'In Memoriam,' dedicated to the assassinated Kennedy brothers." The New York Times review by Martin Williams was written shortly after the album's original release:

West Coast pianist Clare Fischer has done what I wish Monk would do: he has written his own big band arrangements; the results are admirable. Fischer can make his ensembles whisper, sing, shout, praise, explain, cajole, proclaim. He is not afraid to be simple when simplicity will work; he can write for a mere quintet within the ensemble when he wants to. The solos by tenor saxophonist Warne Marsh, particularly, and baritone saxophonist Bill Perkins are the best I've heard from these men, but, the leader excepted, some of the other improvisers confine themselves to other people's ideas.

== Track listing ==
All selections composed by Clare Fischer except where noted.
All selections arranged by Clare Fischer with the exception of "Calamus," which is arranged by the composer.
Side One

1. "The Duke" – 4:53
2. "Miles Behind" – 5:03
3. "Calamus" (Stewart Fischer) – 4:44
4. "Lennie's Pennies" (Lennie Tristano) – 5:22

Side Two

1. "Twas Only Yesterday" – 6:29
2. "Bitter Leaf" (Stewart Fischer) – 6;58
3. "Upper Manhattan Medical Group" (Billy Strayhorn) – 4:11
4. "In Memoriam (John F. & Robert F. Kennedy)" – 1:55 (alto sax solo – Clare Fischer)

== Personnel ==
- Clare Fischer – piano, Fender-Rhodes electronic piano
- Gary Foster – lead alto sax
- Kim Richmond – alto sax
- Louis Ciotti & Warne Marsh – tenor saxes
- Bill Perkins – baritone sax
- John Lowe – bass sax
- Larry McGuire, Buddy Childers, Conte Candoli, Steve Huffsteter & Stewart Fischer – trumpets
- Gil Falco, Charley Loper & David Sanchez – trombones
- Morris Repass – bass trombone
- Chuck Domanico – bass
- Larry Bunker – drums

On "Calamus," "Bitter Leaf" & "Upper Manhattan Medical Group," Buddy Childers is replaced by John Audino.
