= Brasamba! =

Studio album by Bud Shank, Clare Fischer and Joe Pass
- Released: 1963
- Recorded: April 1963; Pacific Jazz Studios, Hollywood, CA
- Genre: Jazz
- Label: Pacific Jazz; PJ 64
- Producer: Richard Bock

Bud Shank chronology
Bossa Nova Jazz Samba (1962)	Brasamba! (1963)	All Through the Night: Julie London Sings the Choicest of Cole Porter (1965)

Clare Fischer chronology
Bossa Nova Jazz Samba (1962)	Brasamba! (1963)	Surging Ahead (1963)

Brasamba! is an album by saxophonist Bud Shank, pianist Clare Fischer and guitarist Joe Pass released on the Pacific Jazz label.

== Reception ==
Professional ratings
Review scores
Source	Rating
AllMusic	3/5 stars

AllMusic rated the album with 3 stars.

== Track listing ==
All compositions by Clare Fischer, except as indicated

1. "Brasamba" (Bud Shank) - 3:53
2. "Ontem a Noite" - 4:14
3. "Autumn Leaves" (Joseph Kosma, Jacques Prévert, Johnny Mercer) - 4:04
4. "Sambinha" (Shank) - 3:38
5. "Gostoso" - 3:55
6. "If I Should Lose You" (Ralph Rainger, Leo Robin) - 2:57
7. "Barquinho" (Roberto Menescal, Ronaldo Bôscoli) - 3:26
8. "Serenidade" - 3:19
9. "Elizete" - 4:16
10. "Samba de Orfeu" (Luiz Bonfá, Antônio Maria) - 3:02

== Personnel ==
- Bud Shank - alto saxophone, flute
- Clare Fischer - piano
- Joe Pass - guitar
- Ralph Peña - bass
- Larry Bunker - vibraphone, drums
- Chuck Flores, Milt Holland - percussion
