= Elvis Schoenberg's Orchestre Surreal =

American musical group

- Origin: Los Angeles, California, USA
- Genres: Experimental, symphonic rock opera
- Years active: 1997–present
- Website: www.theorchestresurreal.com

Elvis Schoenberg's Orchestre Surreal is a musical group founded in 1997 in Los Angeles. "Elvis Schoenberg" is the persona of composer Ross Wright.

== History ==
The Orchestre Surreal was created by Ross Wright who created "Elvis Schoenberg" as an alternate persona. He derived the name from Austrian composer Arnold Schoenberg and American singer Elvis Presley. The group’s stated mission is to “boldly go where no orchestra has gone before.”

The group earned Best Rock Opera Of The Year, Best Orchestral Arranger, and Outstanding Performance Award by the Los Angeles Music Awards in 2003 and 2004. They have written and produced three fully staged musicals. The first, Dismembering the Classics, connected Shakespearian works with classic rock tunes. The next was Symphony Of the Absurd, which ran one night at the John Anson Ford Amphitheatre.

The group has also marched in the Pasadena Doo-Dah Parade.

== Configuration ==
The group was designed to be able to perform classical orchestral music, big band, and rock and roll. The ensemble consists of three woodwind sections, including a first section of three players who double on piccolo, flute, soprano and alto saxophone, a second section with a flute and tenor saxophone, and a third including a clarinet, bass clarinet, baritone saxophone, two French horns, two trumpets, a trombone, and a tuba. The band also includes an electric guitar player who also plays sitar, pipa, and other stringed, fretted instruments. There is a percussion section including keyboard, electric bass, and two mallet percussionists playing timpani and a wide assortment of hand percussion. Finally, there are two violins, a viola, a cello, and a contra bass. The size of the string section varies from 6 to 1 on a part.

Wright writes all the music for the group and is the group’s conductor.

Fronting the group are a variety of singers and performance artists, including Angela Carole Brown, Dan O’Callaghan, April Fissell, Susan Asbjornson, Jason Paige, and Becky Baeling. The musicians are working studio musicians who perform on Hollywood soundtracks of feature films.

== Critical reception ==
In a 2003 review of a performance at the Ford Amphitheatre, the Los Angeles Times wrote that the group was "not merely content to perform shotgun marriages between the likes of Wagner and Nancy Sinatra, Mussorgsky and Santana, etc., [Ross Wright] (er, [Elvis Schoenberg]) took on a more ambitious task Friday night at the Ford Amphitheatre -- a 'book musical' of a sort called 'Symphony of the Absurd!' It was, as Ed Sullivan would have said, 'a really big shew' in which Wright incorporated many of his set pieces and some newer numbers into a hellzapoppin' revue, with an eclectic assortment of dancers, sexy girls, pulp novel narrations, lighting effects, dry ice."

== Discography ==
- Air Surreal (1998)
- It's Alive (2003)
- Manic Voodoo Lady: Tribute To Jimi Hendrix (2009)
