= Alone Together (Clare Fischer album) =

Studio album by Clare Fischer
- Released: 1977; US release -1980
- Recorded: October 1975
- Genre: Jazz
- Label: MPS; MPS 15 500 ST; Discovery (US release); DS 820
- Producer: Hans Georg Brunner-Schwer

Clare Fischer chronology
Salsa Picante (1980)	Alone Together (1977)	2+2 (1981)
External audio
- You may listen to "Tahlia" here

Alone Together is a studio album by American composer/arranger/pianist Clare Fischer, recorded in October 1975 and released in 1977 on the German label, MPS, and in the US by Discovery Records in 1980 (catalogue number DS 820). Its 1997 reissue on CD accompanied a volume created by pianist, composer and educator Bill Dobbins, containing transcriptions of four of Alone Together 's tracks and five from Fischer's 1995 solo piano CD, Just Me, and described by saxophonist and longtime Fischer colleague Gary Foster as "among the very best materials published in the field of jazz pedagogy." Of the 1975 recording, Dobbins wrote: "If I had to make a list of the ten most important solo jazz piano recordings of all time, this recording would definitely be on the list."

== Track listing ==
1. "Yesterdays" (Jerome Kern) - 9:47
2. "Du, Du, Liegst Mir Im Herzen" (PD) - 5:03
3. "Tahlia" (Clare Fischer) - 6:04
4. "The Touch of Your Lips" (Ray Noble) - 5:19
5. "Excerpt from Canonic Passacaglia" (Clare Fischer) - 6:31
6. "Everything Happens to Me" (Matt Dennis-Tom Adair) - 5:41
7. "Brunner-Schwerpunkt" (Clare Fischer) - 4:04
8. "I Can't Get Started" (Vernon Duke-Ira Gershwin) - 5:48

== Personnel ==
- Clare Fischer – piano
