= Juan Carlos Paz y Puente =

Mexican-born musician & educator (born 1964)

- Born: Juan Carlos Paz y Puente; Mexico City, Mexico
- Genres: jazz, latin, world music, pop, rock
- Occupations: Musician, Record executive, Record producer, Educator, A&R
- Instrument: Drums
- Years active: 1984–present
- Label: Warner Music One Take

Juan Carlos Paz y Puente is a Mexican-born musician and educator. Paz y Puente was Senior Vice President of Marketing and A&R director for Warner Music Mexico.

== Early career ==
As a musician he began playing the drums and making transcriptions and charts, then making arrangements for well known Traditional Mexican and Spanish recording artists, such as Armando Manzanero, and then became musical director, drummer and arranger for Pandora, Camilo Sesto, Hernaldo Zúñiga and Rocío Dúrcal all of with which he toured extensively. Paz y Puente was one of the musical directors for the Plácido Domingo and Friends concert with Frank Sinatra, Julie Andrews and John Denver. Eventually commissioned as Production Manager for Luis Miguel, Paz y Puente then left to take the charge of the A&R department at Warner Music Mexico and was given the title of Vice President of A&R. He was named Senior Vice President of Marketing & A&R for Warner Music Mexico. In 1993, with Mario Santos, he founded Centro Universitario de Música Fermatta (from which he's no longer affiliated since 2008). Under his direction, Fermatta was the first private institution in Contemporary Music Education that received official recognition from the Mexican Government.

He co-founded Renascita S.A de C.V in Monterrey, Mexico (May 2021); the company's activities include live event production, artistic direction, recording and music production, as well as composition for film and television series. Renascita also has its own record label, OneTake. As producer, composer, arranger and musical director Paz y Puente has worked such artists as Carlos Santana, Celia Cruz, David Foster, Vinnie Colaiuta, Lucero, Jon Anderson, Peter Erskine, John Carpenter, Gregg Bissonette, Randy Waldman, Maná, Café Tacuba, Clare Fischer, José José, Guadalupe Pineda, Napoleón, Alejandro Fernández, Emmanuel, Ana Bárbara, Edith Márquez, Ana Gabriel, Bill Schnee, Lee Sklar, Tim Pierce, Narada Michael Walden, Francisco Céspedes, La Ley, Humberto Gatica, Ricardo Montaner, Bebu Silvetti, Luis Fernando Ochoa, Daniela Luján, Fernando Osorio, Eduardo Diazmuñoz, Mark Kamins, Piero Cassano, Thalía, Oscar Vallejo, Michael Thompson, Bruce Gowdy, and Mijares, among others.

== Awards and committees ==
Paz y Puente is a recipient of the "El Sol de Oro" from the Mexican National Journalist Council and has been a member of the Blue Ribbon Committee for Latin Academy of Recording Arts & Sciences that overseas the Latin Grammy Awards. As a producer for Francisco Céspedes' album Vida Loca, he won 3 Premios Amigo in Spain for: "Best Latin Album", "Best Male Latin Artist" and "Best New Latin Artist" by selling over a 1,000,000 albums worldwide. He frequently lectures at universities in the United States and Mexico. Professor Paz y Puente teaches periodically at UCLA and has taught both Song Composition and Latin Music Business there. He founded M&L Music, a record label and publishing company with Roberto Figueroa, Mario Santos, and Amir Agai.

== Mexican Bicentennial ==
In celebration of the Mexican Bicentennial, Juan Carlos Paz y Puente co-produced and arranged a special project with Mexican recording artist Elán Recuerdos y Tequila is a collection of songs from some of Latin America and Spain's most beloved and well known composers and songwriters with special musical arrangements meant to honor the songs' original melodies.

This project feature Peter Erskine on drums (Weather Report, Steely Dan, Diana Krall); percussionist Alex Acuña (Elvis Presley, U2, Weather Report) Brian Bromberg on bass (Dizzy Gillespie, Michael Bublé) Michael Thompson (guitarist) on guitar (Michael Jackson, Ringo Starr) Lee Thornburg (Chicago, Supertramp) and orchestral arrangements by Eduardo Diazmuñoz.

== Partial discography ==
- Carolina de la Muela, Single "Encandilada", Producer
- Carolina de la Muela Ft Judit Neddermann, Single "Amanecer", Producer
- Carolina de la Muela, Single "Mil Años Luz", Producer
- Carolina de la Muela, Single "Tan Preciosa", Producer
- OSUANL, Album "Colores de México", Producer
- Carolina de la Muela, Single "Lindo No Pensar", Producer
- Strawberry Pom, EP "POM!", Producer
- Carolina de la Muela, "Esenciales II", Producer
- Eugenio Toussaint, album Trío, credit: Producer
- Eugenio Toussaint, album El Pez Dorado, credit: Producer
- Clare Fischer, album Introspectivo credit: Producer
- Francisco Céspedes, album Vida Loca credit: Producer
- Francisco Céspedes, album Donde Está la Vida credit: Producer and Composer
- Café Tacuba, album Revés / Yo soy credit: A&R
- Maná, album MTV Unplugged credit: A&R
- La Ley, album Uno credit: A&R
- La Ley, album Vértigo credit: A&R and Executive Producer
- Edith Márquez, album Frente a ti credit: A&R and Executive Producer
- Edith Márquez, album Caricias del cielo credit: A&R and Executive Producer
- Lucero, album Mi destino credit: Composer
- José José, album Homenaje en vivo 30 años credit: Arranger
- El Tri, album Sinfónico credit: A&R and Executive Producer
- El Tri, album Fin de siglo credit: A&R
- El Tri, album Cuando tu no Estás credit: A&R
- Ricardo Montaner, album Con la London Metropolitan Orchestra credit: A&R
- Ricardo Montaner, album Es Así credit: A&R
- Álex Lora, album Lora su Lira y sus Rolas credit: A&R
- Elán, album Recuerdos y Tequila credit: Co-producer and arranger
- Elán, album Street Child credit: Arranger
