= Machaca (album) =

Studio album by Clare Fischer
- Released: 1979 – German release 1980 – US release
- Recorded: May 16, 17, 1979
- Studio: Capitol (Hollywood)
- Genre: Latin jazz
- Length: 45:22
- Label: MPS; MPS 15 554 ST; Trend/Discovery; DS-835
- Producer: Clare Fischer

Clare Fischer chronology
2+2 (1980)	Machaca (1979)	Head, Heart and Hands (1982)

Machaca is an album by American composer-arranger/keyboardist Clare Fischer, the second to feature his Latin jazz combo, Salsa Picante. (Note: Although this was indeed the second Salsa Picante album made by Fischer, recorded almost a year and a half before the LP that introduced his supplementary vocal unit 2 + 2 (Foreign Exchange – The First Album in its German release and 2+2 in the U.S.), it was the latter disc that preceded Machaca in their respective U.S. releases.) Recorded on May 16 and 17, 1979, it was released in 1980 on the German label, MPS, and in the U.S. the following year on the Discovery label.

== Reception ==
Professional ratings
Review scores
Source	Rating
Los Angeles Times	3.5/5 stars

Los Angeles Times jazz critic Leonard Feather awarded the album 3 1/2 stars, citing the blend of "light rock, Brazilian and miscellaneous Latin," and further noting that:

The leader's organ and other keyboard work and Rick Zunigar's guitar have some striking moments, and a team of percussionists stir up a storm, though the rhythmic excesses become tiresome on the title number. "Novios" is charming, with a suave beat and Gary Foster on flute. "African Flutes" makes intriguing use of two bass recorders, played by Fischer and Foster.

== Track listing ==
All selections composed by Clare Fischer except where noted.

Side One

1. "African Flutes" – 8:08
2. "Gaviota" – 6:14
3. "Suddenly" – 5:18
4. "Clavo" – 3:13

Side Two

1. "Machaca" - 9:39
2. "Cositas" (David Troncoso) – 3:25
3. "Novios" – 2:40
4. "Gentle Breeze" – 6:45

== Personnel ==
- Clare Fischer – e-piano, Yamaha EX-42 organ
- Rick Zunigar – guitar
- David Troncoso – el. bass
- Gary Foster – flute, soprano sax, bass recorder
- Aaron Ballesteros – drums
- Alex Acuña – tambora, drums, timbales, percussion, bongos
- Poncho Sanchez – conga, bongos, campana
- Hector "Buckey" Andrade – percussion, campana (bell), quinto, bongos, timbales
