= Morning (Clare Fischer composition) =

Composition by Clare Fischer

from the album Manteca!
- Released: 1965
- Genre: Guajira, Afro-Cuban jazz, cha-cha-chá
- Length: 4:05
- Label: Pacific Jazz
- Composer: Clare Fischer
- Producer: Richard Bock

"Morning" is a Latin Jazz standard written by American pianist/composer/arranger Clare Fischer, first heard on his 1965 LP, Manteca!, Fischer's first recording conceived entirely in the Afro-Cuban idiom, which, along with the Brazilian music he had explored at length over the previous three years, would provide fertile ground for Fischer's musical explorations over the next half-century.

== Form ==
"Morning" was Fischer's first - and, to this day, his most famous - contribution to the then recently evolved cha-cha-chá genre. Its structure is the standard A-A-B-A, 32 measures in length. In practice, however, the song's debut recording does take one significant detour, paying unashamed homage to one of its composer's primary musical influences in the process, when, halfway through trombonist Gil Falco's solo, instead of proceeding to the bridge, "Morning" morphs into a 16-bar development of the principal 2-measure motif of "Spring Rounds," the fourth section from Stravinsky's The Rite of Spring.

== Lyrics ==
It remains unclear exactly when Fischer's lyrics to "Morning" were written, but they were not unveiled until the debut of 2+2, the vocal group with which Fischer supplemented his fledgling Latin jazz combo, Salsa Picante, in 1980. Long before that, however, he had been upstaged, at least throughout the Spanish-speaking world, by Mexican singer José José's eponymous 1969 debut LP, which featured a "Morning" cover under the title "Una mañana" ("One morning") with Spanish lyrics written by Joaquín Prieto. Head start aside, the magnitude of José's stardom all but guaranteed that any Spanish-language version supplied by the composer was doomed to obscurity, a situation still lamented by Fischer almost thirty years later. Fischer's own lyrics, however, have - at least in their original language - gained some traction since their 1981 debut in Clare Fischer & Salsa Picante Present 2+2, with subsequent recordings by Lisa Rich, Meredith D'Ambrosio, Jeanie Bryson, Dianne Reeves, Alex & Nilusha, and, most recently, on Roseanna Vitro's album Clarity, Music of Clare Fischer. Moreover, near the end of Fischer's life, two versions of the song, one featuring the approved Spanish-language version of his lyric, the other, the Portuguese, were recorded by the Clare Fischer Voices, under the direction of the composer's son, Brent Fischer, on ...And Sometimes Instruments.

== Selected recordings ==
- Clare Fischer - Manteca!, 1965
- Sergio Mendes - The Great Arrivall, 1966, orchestra arranged & conducted by Fischer.
- Cal Tjader - Soul Burst, 1966, featuring Chick Corea, with arrangements by Oliver Nelson.
- José José - José José, 1969, as "Una Mañana", performed in Spanish with entirely new lyrics.
- Roberto Roena, 1977, as "Una Mañana", from the album "La 8va Maravilla".
- Cal Tjader - Here, recorded June 1977, released 1979, live performance at the Great American Music Hall, with Fischer on piano.
- Clare Fischer - Salsa Picante, recorded 1978, released 1980.
- Lorez Alexandria - A Woman Knows, released in 1979, debuting his lyrics for "Morning".
- Mauro Calderón Latin recording with a video, one of the great versions on the market in Spanish .
- Poncho Sanchez - Poncho, 1979, liner notes by Fischer, also piano, arranger & conductor.
- Donald Byrd - Donald Byrd and 125th Street, N.Y.C., 1979, entire track features Fischer's electric piano solo.
- The Latin Percussion Jazz Ensemble - Live at the Montreux Jazz Festival 1980, with Tito Puente, Carlos "Patato" Valdes, Alfredo de la Fe, and Jorge Dalto.
- Clare Fischer - Clare Fischer & Salsa Picante Present 2+2, recorded in September 1980, released in 1981, debuting 2+2 (the vocal portion of Fischer's Latin jazz group).
- Lisa Rich - Listen Here, 1983, features vocalist Rich, backed by trio.
- Mary Fettig - In Good Company, 1985, on alto saxophone, with Marian McPartland, Ray Brown, Jeff Hamilton, and Peter Sprague.
- Tito Puente and his Latin Ensemble - Sensación, 1986
- Meredith D'Ambrosio - South to a Warmer Place, 1989, singing Fischer's lyrics.
- Kellye Gray - Standards in Gray, 1990
- Jeanie Bryson - Live at Warsaw Jazz Jamboree, October 24-27th, 1991 (Videocassette), singing Fischer's lyrics.
- Michael Carvin - Revelation, 1991
- Lori Andrews - Bossame Mucho, 1994, featuring Andrews on harp.
- Poncho Sanchez - Soul Sauce: Memories of Cal Tjader, 1995, with Fischer, celeste, orchestral arrangements, conductor.
- Manfredo Fest - Começar de Novo: To Begin Again, 1995, featuring Hendrik Meurkens and Portinho.
- Café Tacvba - Una Tributo, 1998, as "Una Mañana", using the José José lyrics.
- Clare Fischer - The Latin Side, 1998, Metropole Orchestra, arranged by Fischer.
- Poncho Sanchez - Afro-Cuban Fantasy, 1998, featuring vocalist Dianne Reeves, singing Fischer's lyrics.
- Blue Wisp Big Band - 20th Anniversary, 2000
- Richard Powell - MultiMIDIa, 2001
- Bert van den Brink - Bert van den Brink Invites Clare Fischer, 2001, Van den Brink & Fischer, pianos.
- Ken Schaphorst & the NEC Jazz Orchestra - NEC's annual festival, night 4. Jazz Legacy, recorded live, Jordan Hall, on March 11, 2004, unreleased.
- Café Tacuba - Unplugged, 2005 (recorded 1995), as "Una Mañana", again using the José José lyrics.
- Sara Lazarus - Give Me the Simple Life, 2005, featuring Alain Jean-Marie on piano
- Peruchín Jr. - Sobre blancas y negras, as "Una Mañana", featuring Pedro Jústiz "Peruchín Jr." on piano.
- Chamin Correa - En Concierto, 2006, as "Una Mañana", featuring guitarist Correa.
- Sugo music's Latin Rhythms Series - Salsa: Music of Dance, 2008, featuring Ramon Flores on trumpet.
- Bill Dobbins - Eastman Jazz Ensemble, recorded live, Kilbourn Hall, on February 13, 2008, unreleased.
- Bill Dobbins - Eastman Studio Orchestra, recorded live, March 7, 2008, Eastman Theatre, unreleased.
- Adela Dalto - A Brazilian Affair, 2009, using the José José lyrics.
- Gabriel Espinosa - Latin American Ensemble, recorded live, December 5, 2009, Bucksbaum Center for the Arts, Grinnell College, as "Una Mañana."
- Maria Catharina - Obsesion, 2010, as "Una Mañana," using the José José lyrics in a jazz context.
- The Clare Fischer Voices - ...And Sometimes Instruments, 2012, including two versions, "Una Mañana" and "Manhã", introducing officially approved adaptations of Fischer's original lyric, in Spanish and Portuguese, respectively.
- Alex & Nilusha - Moments in Time, 2012, with Fischer's lyrics, featuring Dave Valentin on flute.
- Roseanna Vitro - Clarity: Music of Clare Fischer, 2014, singing Fischer's lyrics.
