= Surging Ahead =

Studio album by Clare Fischer
- Released: 1963
- Recorded: at Pacific Jazz Studios
- Genre: Jazz
- Length: 38 min
- Label: Pacific Jazz; PJ 67
- Producer: Richard Bock

Clare Fischer chronology
| Brasamba! (1963) | Surging Ahead (1963) | Extension (1963) |
External audio
- You may listen to "Strayhorn" here

Professional ratings
Review scores
| Source | Rating |
|---|---|
| AllMusic | 2/5 stars |
| Atlanta Daily World | favorable |
| Audio | favorable |
| Down Beat | 5/5 stars |
| Gramophone | favorable |

Surging Ahead is the second album by American composer/arranger/keyboardist Clare Fischer, released in 1963 by Pacific Jazz Records.

== Reception ==
The Atlanta Daily World's Albert Anderson received Fischer's sophomore outing much as he had the debut:

The former arranger for the Hi-Lo's, Fischer has worked quietly behind the jazz scenes until recently, when he waxed his first album. It was a big hit for him. Here, Fischer and the trio play the blues the way they ought to be played – with deep feeling. Just dig his version of "Things Ain't What They Used to Be," and you'll get the message. The group's playing on this number really reflects pensiveness. This is the top tune, but the entire fare is delightful. Each of the sidemen contribute substantially to the session. A solid entry for Fischer and Co.

== Track listing ==
Side 1

1. "Billie's Bounce" (Charlie Parker)
2. "Way Down East" (Larry Adler)
3. "Satin Doll" (Billy Strayhorn)
4. "This Can't Be Love" (Richard Rodgers-Lorenz Hart)

Side 2

1. "Strayhorn" (Clare Fischer)
2. "Things Ain't What They Used to Be" (Mercer Ellington-Johnny Mercer) – 3:13
3. "Davenport Blues" (Bix Beiderbecke)
4. "Without a Song" (Vincent Youmans)

== Personnel ==
- Clare Fischer – piano (all tracks)
- Albert Stinson – bass (Side One)
- Colin Bailey – drums (Side One)
- Ralph Pena – bass (Side Two, tracks 1–3)
- Larry Bunker – drums (Side Two, tracks 1–3)
- Gary Peacock – bass (Side Two, track 4)
- Gene Stone – drums (Side Two, track 4)
