= Só Danço Samba (album) =

So Danço Samba

Studio album by Clare Fischer
- Released: 1964
- Recorded: at World Pacific Studios; Hollywood, California
- Genre: Jazz, Bossa Nova
- Label: World Pacific; WP 1830
- Producer: Richard Bock

Clare Fischer chronology
Extension (1963)	So Danço Samba (1964)	Manteca! (1965)

Professional ratings
Review scores
Source	Rating
Allmusic	3/5 stars
American Record Guide	favorable

So Danço Samba is the fourth album by keyboardist/composer-arranger Clare Fischer, and his first in the bossa nova vein, recorded and released in 1964 on the World Pacific label. Devoted primarily to the music of Antonio Carlos Jobim, it also features three of Fischer's own compositions.

== Reception ==
In its review, American Record Guide commends both "Clare Fischer, a continually rewarding pianist from the West Coast," and his "unusually fine album of bossa nova selections."

== Track listing ==
All compositions by Antonio Carlos Jobim except where noted.

Side One

1. "So Danço Samba" - 2:55
2. "Desafinado" - 2:59
3. "Quiet Nights (Corcovado)" - 3:41
4. "Pensativa" (Clare Fischer) - 4:21
5. "Carnaval" (Clare Fischer) - 3:10

Side Two

1. "Girl From Ipanema" - 3:32
2. "Ornithardy" (Clare Fischer) - 2:56
3. "O Amor em Paz" - 2:47
4. "How Insensitive" - 3:19
5. "One Note Samba" - 4:22

== Personnel ==
- Clare Fischer - piano & organ
- Dennis Budimir - guitar
- Bob West - bass
- Colin Bailey - drums
