= Brent Fischer =

American composer, bandleader, and musician

- Born: Brent Sean Cecil Fischer; July 13, 1964 (age 61); Los Angeles, California, U.S.
- Genres: Jazz, bossa nova, Afro-Cuban jazz, fusion, funk, classical, vocal, pop
- Occupations: Musician, composer, arranger
- Instruments: Bass guitar, vibraphone, percussion
- Years active: 1980–present
- Labels: hr2 kultur, Clavo

Brent Sean Cecil Fischer (born July 13, 1964) is an American composer, arranger, bandleader, bass guitarist and percussionist. The son of noted composer, arranger, and keyboardist Clare Fischer, Brent Fischer made his recording debut with his father's Latin jazz combo, Salsa Picante, at the age of sixteen, thus inaugurating a more than 30-year-long professional association between the two. Initially confined to performing credits, his input gradually expanded, until, by 2004, Fischer had assumed not merely a large share of the elder Fischer's arranging workload, but also active leadership of the working ensembles directed by his father; moreover, since 2005, Brent Fischer has produced all of his father's albums, starting with Introspectivo. The first two of these released after Clare Fischer's death, ¡Ritmo! and Music for Strings, Percussion and the Rest, each won Grammys; the former in 2013 for Best Latin Jazz Album, the latter in 2014 for Best Instrumental Composition.

== Career ==
=== Early life ===
Born Brent Sean Cecil Fischer (Cecil after his paternal grandfather), Fischer was the first of two children born to Clare and Zoe Ann Fischer (née Routsos) and the second of three born to Clare, including his son Lee by an earlier marriage.

Born into a music-infused environment ("When I was two years old, I used to lie underneath our grand piano with our dog while he was practicing or composing"), Brent quickly displayed an interest in, and affinity for, his father's calling, and the wholehearted support afforded his youthful explorations – "I was playing on cardboard boxes when I was three years old; he got me my first drum set when I was six" – reaped early dividends for both father and son, as recalled in an interview recorded shortly after Fischer's death in January 2012:

I got interested in electric bass when I was 14 and he got me an instrument. And at that point, he saw my abilities developing very rapidly, and it just turned out very well, actually. He decided that he liked the sound of the electric bass – because of its pitch and its sustain – better than the upright bass that he'd been using in his Latin jazz group at the time. And that bass player, who was a very fine bassist, but was also getting busy with other projects, had to leave the group. So it was just perfect timing that my abilities had come far enough at that point so he felt comfortable putting me in the band. So, I made my first CD with Clare Fischer in 1980,[sic] and here we are, 32 years later, still making CDs.

=== 1980s ===
While continuing to perform and record with Salsa Picante, Fischer also began to assist his father in his commercial arranging assignments, commencing in 1985 with Prince's album Parade (not coincidentally, the first time the elder Fischer had been called upon by one of his arranging clients to participate in such a large proportion of an album's contents); his task was to provide transcriptions of the basic audio tracks sent by the clients. As he recalled in a 2005 interview:

[W]e liked to ask them to send us something that's as close to what the final mix is going to be, minus having the orchestra on there... They'd send us a tape, and I would take down everything, note for note – the vocal lines, the guitar solos, bass lines, drum beats; if there was a drum fill in there, he wanted me to write it out. The idea is that... he likens what he's doing to fitting the pieces of a jigsaw puzzle together. So if I point out to him every little part that's happening, every little line in the background, then he can see where the spaces are, and fit the puzzle pieces together. And that way he doesn't step on a vocalist with one of his string or woodwind lines.

During that decade, Fischer continued to pursue his formal education, earning a Bachelor of Music Degree in Symphonic Percussion from California State University Northridge in 1988. However, it was not that milestone, but rather an unforeseen and unfortunate occurrence approximately one year later, that suddenly and dramatically upgraded Fischer's responsibilities vis-à-vis his father's career.

On July 13, 1989, Brent Fischer's 25th birthday celebration was abruptly preempted by news of his father's hospitalization; a roadside traffic dispute between the 60-year-old Fischer and a man half his age had escalated, resulting in a near-fatal skull fracture and concussion. Not only was he incapacitated for approximately a month (and any subsequent performances and recordings delayed by more than seven months); it catapulted his son into the position of interim liaison/spokesperson/manager (not to mention coordinator of various fund-raising efforts to help defray the resulting medical expenses), assignments which, in varying degrees, would outlast the elder Fischer's recuperation, continuing indefinitely.

=== 1990s ===
Throughout the 1990s, in addition to coordinating his father's career (while pursuing his own), Fischer gradually assumed a more significant role within the arranging process itself. Initially, as he would recount in a 2005 lecture, this consisted simply of taking on some of the jobs his father had declined:

My part started about 12, 13 years ago, when there were certain arrangements that he wasn't interested in doing. Sometimes [he was asked] to collaborate with a keyboard player who had already written out some things that he wanted orchestrated for strings . [My father] prefers to write from the ground up and to have complete artistic control. I, on the other hand, don't mind collaborating with people. I kind of enjoy it as long as the writer is talented. I think it's an interesting challenge to put two people's ideas together.

Notwithstanding his father's principled stance, eventually the two began to collaborate in earnest. Fischer recalls the process in a 2011 interview:

When he needed help making a deadline, I'd either orchestrate something that he'd written or we would do, for lack of a better term, tag team arranging. He'd write something all day and then go to bed and I'd come over after I'd slept all day and sit at the piano and fill in the same score and continue where he left off, then I'd go to bed, and when he got up in the morning he'd pick up where I had left off. That worked really well because my style was so similar to his, I didn't have to worry about finishing a phrase and neither did he... That was a wonderful experience. Then finally at some point I had to ghost write arrangements for him while he was out of town and he couldn't get back in time for a recording date.

=== 2000 and beyond ===
A more significant example of the latter phenomenon occurred in 2004, when those same health concerns that had already forced Fischer to step down as director of his various ensembles now prevented him from making good on a commission received from the hr Big Band of Frankfurt, requesting a jazz arrangement of Mussorgsky's "Pictures At An Exhibition". Again, speaking in 2011, Brent Fischer recounted his impromptu initiation into professional big band arranging:

[H]e hadn't really gotten anything more than a sketch down on paper when his diabetes flared up. We went through a long time of seeing all the different medical specialists and they finally found the right combination of medications to get everything back to normal. Meanwhile, we had the deadline approaching and I took it upon myself to write the arrangement... My goal was that it would be done very creatively but also something that would pay tribute to my father... [T]he first email we got after sending the music was from the director who said, "One can hear Clare Fischer's writing in every bar". That really made both of us proud. We called them when they were getting ready to release the CD and told them what had happened. Dad was listed as "co-arranger", because I checked everything with him... I'd been working with him over twenty years, so it was really easy to write something that he was happy with.

The following year, after planning and producing Fischer's solo piano CD, Introspectivo, Brent and his father, along with his uncle Dirk Fischer, embarked on a joint endeavor, released in 2006 as Family Affair, featuring a clarinet choir, plus a trumpet, trombone and rhythm section. In addition to one piano solo and eight arrangements by his father, plus one additional track composed and arranged by Dirk, the album featured five Brent Fischer arrangements, including three of his own compositions and two by his father. But for Fischer, who had – like his stepmother Donna Fischer – spent countless hours poring through his father's extensive and largely unrecorded catalogue over the years, one goal had become paramount during these years, even before his succession to the helm of the Clare Fischer bands in 2004. Speaking at his father's memorial in February 2012, he recalled:

I've been under intense pressure over the past 10 years, because I wanted to make sure that my father got to hear everything he had ever written... I wanted to make sure we got a chance to record him playing, we got a chance to record all of his bands playing, and even if he only got a chance to hear rough tracks, or even, in the case of some large orchestral pieces, a computer mock-up using samples. I'm happy to say I did accomplish that goal... and got specific instructions from him for how each of these pieces should be finalized. Now because we've been doing all this recording, it's finally time to start releasing. We did a little bit last year, but I'm also happy to say that over the next decade, I hope to be able to release a lot of new Clare Fischer material; compositions and some of his playing that nobody to this date has heard.

For his part, Fischer, in the notes accompanying ... And Sometimes Instruments, one of the last of his albums to be released during his lifetime, expressed satisfaction with this effort, attesting as well to the symbiosis previously alluded to by his son:

When I reflect back on all the music in my life, I can't help but think about the pieces I wrote that have yet to be released. There is much material and several years ago I asked my son Brent to see that it all gets done. He has worked tirelessly and, having absorbed my style over the decades, is uniquely qualified to direct these recordings, in some cases finishing works for me so, at my age, I can just listen and enjoy.

While engaged in this ambitious undertaking on his father's behalf, Fischer began to build his own arranging résumé, providing backgrounds for artists such as Toni Braxton, Eric Benet, Kirk Franklin, Usher, Al Jarreau and Michael Jackson. As the decade wore on, however, his father's health continued to worsen and Fischer intensified his efforts. These would culminate in the near simultaneous release, in September 2011, of two new albums, one with the vocal ensemble, and one with the big band, the latter bringing Fischer his 11th Grammy nomination. In retrospect, the hastening of Brent's efforts proved well-judged, as his father did not live to see his album's Grammy bid fall short, dying on January 26, 2012, more than two weeks prior to the awards ceremony.

=== Posthumous partnership ===
The first of the decade's promised posthumous offerings, ¡Ritmo!, released on September 11, 2012, was Brent Fischer's realization of a longstanding dream of his father's – that being the idea of presenting his Latin jazz material in a big band setting, something they simply could not afford in previous decades. Also included is an original composition of his own, entitled "Rainforest", a radical reworking of his "Undiscovered Rainforest" (a piece previously commissioned and recorded by a Dutch ensemble, the Zapp String Quartet) as well as his arrangement of Clare's "San Francisco P.M."

This time around, his efforts, and his father's, would be rewarded on February 10, 2013, with Brent's first – and Clare's first posthumous – Grammy Award (the second, overall, for Fischer, the first having greeted the father and son's first recorded collaboration in 1981).

== Personal life ==
Following on the heels of his father's much-belated and oft-recounted reunion, circa late 1992, early 1993, with high school sweetheart Donna Van Ringelesteyn, Fischer met his future wife, Parisa Mansoory, shortly thereafter. Freed from the parental disapproval that had derailed Fischer's romance, the two were married on August 9, 1994. Subject of an eponymous tribute (described by the Fischers' copyist Curt Berg as "complex and beautiful, which is exactly how Brent feels about his better half") on her husband's 2006 album, A Family Affair, Parisa Fischer has since given birth to a son.

== Discography ==
=== As sideman ===
With The Black Cats

- Popfather (Caltex, 2003)

With Natalie Cole

- Holly & Ivy (Elektra, 1994)

With Clare Fischer

- 2+2 (1981)
- And Sometimes Voices (1982)
- Crazy Bird (1985)
- Freefall (1986)
- Tjaderama (1987)
- Remembrances (Lembranças) (1990)
- Rockin' in Rhythm (1997)
- The Latin Side (Koch Jazz, 1998)
- Latin Patterns: Clare Fischer & The Legendary MPS Sessions (1999)

With Kirk Franklin

- Hero (2005)

With Elvis Schoenberg's Orchestre Surreal

- It's Alive (2003)

With Summer Rapture

- Shades of Jade (Absolute Pitch, 1990)

With Ray Zod

- New Life (CD Baby, 2009)

=== As arranger or composer ===
With Eric Benet

- Love & Life (Reprise, 2008)

With Toni Braxton

- Snowflakes (Arista, 2001)
- More Than a Woman (Arista, 2002)

With Elvis Costello and The Roots

- Wise Up Ghost (Blue Note, 2013)

With D'Angelo and the Vanguard

- Black Messiah (RCA, 2014) – string arrangement and conductor on "Really Love"

With Dominique Dalcan

- Ostinato (Polygram, 1998)

With Clare Fischer

- A Family Affair (2006)
- The Clare Fischer Voices...and Sometimes Instruments (2011)
- Continuum (2011)
- ¡Ritmo! (2012)
- Music for Strings, Percussion, and the Rest (2013)

With Kirk Franklin

- Hero (GospoCentric, 2005)

With Michael Jackson

- Michael Jackson's This Is It (Epic, 2009)

With Al Jarreau

- Christmas (RCA, 2008)

With Krista

- Taking Back Brooklyn (RCA/Jive, 2009)

With Prince

- Lotusflow3r (NPG, 2009)

With The HR Big Band

- Pictures at an Exhibition / Echoes of Aranjuez (hr2 kultur, 2005)

With Usher

- Here I Stand (LaFace, 2008)

With Vanessa L. Williams

- The Sweetest Days (Wing/Mercury)

=== As orchestra manager ===
With Coko

- Hot Coko (RCA, 1999)

With Dru Hill

- Dru World Order (Def Soul, 2002)

With Prince

- Parade (Warner Bros., 1986)
- Batman (Warner Bros., 1990)
- Crystal Ball (NPG, 1998)

With Raphael Saadiq

- The Way I See It (Columbia/Sony, 2008)
- Live in Paris (Sony, 2010)

With Joss Stone

- Colour Me Free! (Virgin, 2009)

With Teena Marie

- Congo Square (Concord, 2009)

With Terri Walker

- Untitled (Def Soul/Mercury, 2003)
