= Gary Foster (musician) =

American musician (1936–2026)

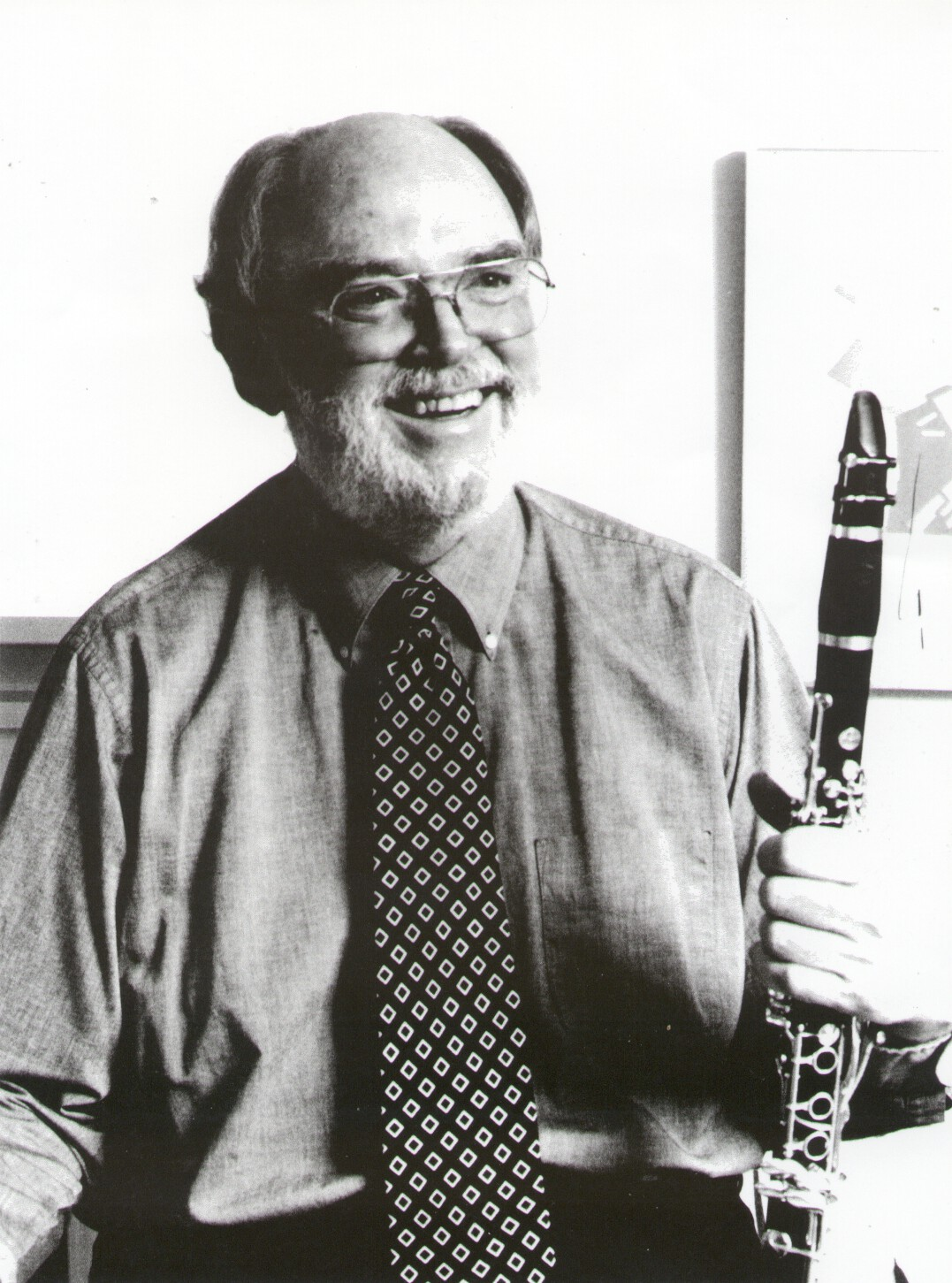

Background information
- Born: Norman Gary Foster; May 25, 1936; Leavenworth, Kansas, U.S.
- Died: May 24, 2026 (aged 89) Los Angeles, California, U.S.
- Genres: Jazz, cool jazz, classical, pop
- Occupations: Musician, educator
- Instruments: Saxophone, clarinet, flute
- Years active: 1961–2026
- Label: Revelation

Norman Gary Foster (May 25, 1936 – May 24, 2026) was an American musician who played saxophone, clarinet, and flute. He is considered a crossover artist, performing jazz, pop, and classical music. He has been prominent in the film, television, and music industries for five decades, having performed on over 500 movie scores and with over 200 orchestras.

Foster recorded on numerous Grammy, Academy Award, Emmy, and Golden Globe winning media and soundtracks for artists and composers such as Carol Burnett, Bob Dylan, Barbra Streisand, Mel Torme, Toshiko Akiyoshi, Frank Sinatra, Pat Williams, John Williams, Natalie Cole, Jerry Fielding, Cal Tjader, Marty Paich, and Michael Bublé.

He received the Most Valuable Player Award for woodwind doubling from The Recording Academy.

== Early life, education and influences ==
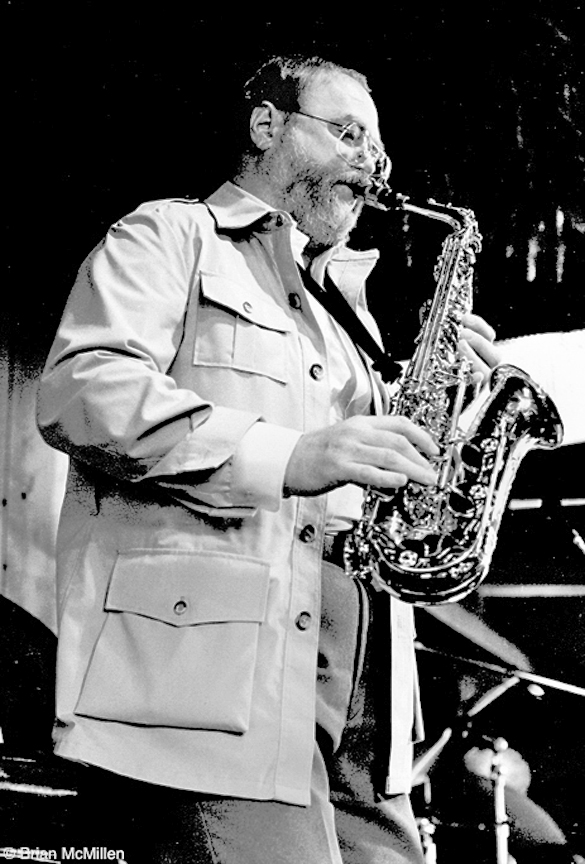
Gary Foster at Bach Dancing & Dynamite Society, Half Moon Bay CA 6/14/81

Gary Foster was born in Leavenworth, Kansas, in 1936. He started on the clarinet at age thirteen. His first musical inspiration was Olin Parker, a school music director and teacher who introduced him to the music of Count Basie, Woody Herman, and many other types of music. He listened closely to the Woody Herman Orchestra's recording of "Four Brothers", which featured saxophonists Stan Getz, Zoot Sims, and Serge Chaloff. For Foster, Getz stood out on the tenor saxophone because of his tone. Foster also acknowledged the influence of Lester Young and Charlie Parker.

Jazz critic Zan Stewart compared Foster's style to that of Lee Konitz, Paul Desmond, and Art Pepper (West Coast Jazz style). The music of Lennie Tristano and the concepts taught to him by Warne Marsh have been of great inspiration and influence over the years.

His earliest professional experience was aged 15, playing VFW Hall dances with bassist Harold Stanford. After high school, Foster studied at Central College in Fayette, Missouri, then transferred to the University of Kansas, where he studied classical clarinet and music education. He studied musicology and conducting in graduate school. At the University of Kansas, he played with trumpeter Carmell Jones.

== Professional career ==
In 1961, Foster moved to Los Angeles to work as a jazz musician. He taught privately and studied the flute. Shortly after settling in Alhambra, he turned to studio work as a woodwind doubler. His friendships with Clare Fischer and Warne Marsh were vital to Foster's knowledge of improvisation.

From 1973–1982, he was a member of the Toshiko Akiyoshi – Lew Tabackin Big Band. He worked in the reed sections of big bands led by Louis Bellson, Mike Barone, Clare Fischer, Marty Paich, and Ed Shaughnessy. He has also worked with Rosemary Clooney, Shelly Manne, Sammy Nestico, Poncho Sanchez, and Cal Tjader.

For over 55 years he made his living in studios, recording on albums and for movies and television. His movie credits include Monsters, Inc., Ice Age, Elf, Meet the Fockers, and The Haunted Mansion. His television credits date back to the late 1960s and include several seasons on The Carol Burnett Show, which won several Emmy Awards. He has been in the Academy Awards Television Orchestra for thirty broadcasts. He has performed regularly with the Los Angeles Philharmonic, the Los Angeles Chamber Orchestra, the Los Angeles Opera Orchestra, and the Hollywood Bowl Orchestra.

== Teaching and education career ==
Foster taught privately and in colleges from 1960. From 1971 to 1991 he was on the faculty at Pasadena City College. From 1984 through 2000 he was visiting professor at the University of Missouri, Kansas City. He was on the faculty of University of California, Los Angeles and California State University, Fullerton. He founded Nova Music Studios in Pasadena for private lessons. He has co-authored method books and has led clinics in colleges and universities.

== Death ==
Foster died on May 24, 2026, a day before his 90th birthday.

== Discography ==
=== As leader/co-leader ===
- Alone Together (Revelation, 1964)
- Subconsciously (Revelation, 1968)
- Grand Cru Classe (Revelation, 1969)
- Kansas City Connections (Revelation, 1986)
- Make Your Own Fun (Concord Jazz, 1991)
- Perfect Circularity with Putter Smith (Ajl, 2007)

Collaboration
With Warne Marsh and with Clare Fischer

- Report of the 1st Annual Symposium on Relaxed Improvisation (Revelation, 1973) – rec. 1972

=== As sideman ===
With Clare Fischer

- Extension (Pacific Jazz, 1963)
- One to Get Ready, Four to Go (Revelation, 1968)
- Thesaurus (a.k.a. Twas Only Yesterday) (Atlantic, 1969)
- 2+2 (Pausa, 1981)
- Machaca (Discovery, 1981)
- A Family Affair (CFP, 2006)

With Warne Marsh

- Ne Plus Ultra (Revelation, 1969)
- Warne Marsh Meets Gary Foster (Toshiba-EMI, 1982)

With Cal Tjader

- Hurucan (Crystal Clear, 1978)
- A Fuego Vivo (Concord Jazz Picante, 1982)
- Good Vibes (Concord Jazz Picante, 1984)

With others

- Toshiko Akiyoshi, Kogun (RCA, 1974)
- Alan Broadbent, Live at Maybeck Recital Hall, Volume Fourteen (Concord, 1991)
- Lee Konitz, Body & Soul (Insights, 1996)
- University of Texas Jazz Orchestra, Once in a Blue Moon (UTJO, 2000)
- Bobby Shew, Gary Foster & Friends Play Music of Reed Kotler (Torii, 2003)
- Its About Love - with Bill Cunliffe (Torii, 2004)
- Mark Turner meets Gary Foster (Capri, 2019)

== Bibliography ==
- Berg, Chuck (1976) "Gary Foster: a Kaleidoscopic Kansas Thrives in L.A.," Downbeat, xliii/19 (November 18), p. 15. ISBN B000ZPMSK0
- Feather, Leonard; Gitler, Ira (1999) The Biographical Encyclopedia of Jazz. Oxford University Press, USA. p. 232. ISBN 0-19-507418-1
- Kernfeld, Barry (1995) New Grove Dictionary of Jazz. Oxford University Press, USA. pp. 401–402. ISBN 0-312-11357-9.
