= Revelation Records (jazz) =

American jazz record label (1965–1980s)

Revelation Records was an American jazz record label based in Los Angeles, active from 1965 until the late 1980s.

Revelation was founded by Occidental College professor and then-director of the Moore Laboratory of Zoology, John William (Bill) Hardy and Occidental College student Jonathan Horwich. The label was initially operated out of Los Angeles and then Glendale, California. Hardy had previously written liner notes for Dick Bock's productions for Pacific Jazz Records. Toward the end of the 1970s, the label's base of operations shifted to Gainesville, Florida. The label released approximately 50 albums.

== Artists ==
- Joe Albany
- Bobby Bradford
- Vera Brasil
- Alan Broadbent
- Dennis Budimir
- Charlie Bush
- John Carter
- Jerry Coker
- Clare Fischer
- Gary Foster
- Ronnie Hoopes
- Mark Isham
- Carmell Jones
- Warne Marsh
- Paul Nash
- Anthony "Tony" Ortega
- Jack Reilly
- Putter Smith
- Frank Strazzeri
- Frank Sullivan
- Forrest Westbrook
