= Clare Fischer =

American keyboardist, composer, arranger, and bandleader (1928–2012)

- Fischer photographed by William Claxton, in excerpt from Fischer's article for November 1962 issue of DownBeat.

Background information
- Born: Douglas Clare Fischer; October 22, 1928; Durand, Michigan, U.S.
- Died: January 26, 2012 (aged 83) Los Angeles, California, U.S.
- Genres: Jazz, bossa nova, Afro-Cuban jazz, fusion, funk, classical, third stream, vocal, pop
- Occupations: Composer, arranger, bandleader, session musician
- Instruments: Synthesizer, piano, keyboards, electric piano, alto sax
- Years active: 1943–2011
- Labels: Discovery, Koch, Trend, Pacific Jazz/World Pacific, Revelation, MPS, Concord, Paisley Park
- Website: www.clarefischer.com

Douglas Clare Fischer (October 22, 1928 – January 26, 2012) was an American keyboardist, composer, arranger, and bandleader. After graduating from Michigan State University (from which, five decades later, he would receive an honorary doctorate), he became the pianist and arranger for the vocal group the Hi-Lo's in the late 1950s.

Fischer went on to work with Donald Byrd and Dizzy Gillespie, and became known for his Latin and bossa nova recordings in the 1960s. He composed the Latin jazz standard "Morning", and the jazz standard "Pensativa". Consistently cited by jazz pianist and composer Herbie Hancock as a major influence ("I wouldn't be me without Clare Fischer"), he was nominated for eleven Grammy Awards during his lifetime, winning for his landmark album, 2+2 (1981), the first of Fischer's records to incorporate the vocal ensemble writing developed during his Hi-Lo's days into his already sizable Latin jazz discography; it was also the first recorded installment in Fischer's three-decade-long collaboration with his son Brent. Fischer was also a posthumous Grammy winner for ¡Ritmo! (2012) and for Music for Strings, Percussion and the Rest (2013).

Beginning in the early 1970s, Fischer embarked on a parallel (and far more lucrative) career, eventually becoming a much sought-after arranger, providing orchestral "sweeteners" for pop and R&B artists such as Rufus (with Chaka Khan), Prince (a regular client from 1984 onwards, and by far Fischer's most frequent in pop music), Robert Palmer, Paul McCartney, Michael Jackson and many others.

== Early life and education ==
Fischer was the third of four children born to Cecil and Louella (Roussin) Fischer of Durand, Michigan, United States. His parents were of German, French, Irish-Scot, and English backgrounds. In grade school he started his general music study with violin and piano as his first instruments. At the age of seven, he began to pick out four-part harmony on the piano. After two years of piano lessons the family moved to Grand Rapids, Michigan, where Fischer began composing classical music and making instrumental arrangements for dance bands.

At South High School he took up cello, clarinet, and saxophone. His high school instructor, Glenn Litton, took an interest in the boy and, because the family could not afford it, gave him free lessons in music theory, harmony, and orchestration. Fischer returned the favor by orchestrating and copying music for him. Whenever the concert band needed an instrument, Fischer would be supplied with it and the fingering chart to play it in concert. This gave him a personal training in orchestration that was invaluable.

Fischer started his own band at 15, for which he wrote all the arrangements. After graduating in 1946, he began undergraduate studies in 1947 at Michigan State University, majoring in music composition and theory, and studying with H. Owen Reed. During his teens there were no funds for him to study piano, so he was mostly self-taught. Therefore his major instrument in college was cello, and piano a minor. Later he changed his major to piano and minor in clarinet.

Fischer's roommates at the Michigan State University were Latin Americans, as were the majority of his friends outside the music department. He was introduced to the music of Tito Puente, Tito Rodriguez, Machito and others. Through his friends he became interested in the Spanish language and took it as a minor on his Master's degree. Fischer's passion for music was always matched by his love of languages.

The average person has about a fifteen percent understanding of a foreign language. He knows what language it is and is familiar with one or two words. With music it is not different. Most people only hear the lyrics to a song or feel the beat. I have always made music for good listeners, with 65 to eighty percent of musical understanding. That is why with my vocal sextet all pieces are sung in the original language, whether that is German, Spanish or Japanese.

Fischer graduated in 1951 with a B.M., cum laude, and began his first year of graduate work in composition. The U.S. Army drafted him the next year, sending him to Fort Leonard Wood, Missouri, for basic training. There he played alto saxophone in the band and ended his service as an arranger at the U.S. Military Academy Band at West Point, New York. After the army, Fischer returned to Michigan State. In 1955, he received his Master of Music.

== Initial employment ==
Fischer next lived in Detroit, Michigan, whereupon, after first hearing the vocal quartet The Hi-Lo's in a live performance, he promptly offered his services. Over the next five years, Fischer recorded several albums with the group, serving as pianist and, on occasion, arranger. In addition, he contributed several vocal arrangements, making his debut in that capacity; it was these arrangements that Herbie Hancock would later point to as a major influence:

[T]hat's when I really learned some much farther-out voicings - like the harmonies I used on Speak Like a Child - just being able to do that. I really got that from Clare Fischer's arrangements for the Hi-Lo's. Clare Fischer was a major influence on my harmonic concept... I heard some of his last records, and he was still doing amazing harmonic stuff. And, of course, he was a wonderful pianist, too. But it was those vocal harmonies that were the first thing I heard. I was in awe of him.

When Fischer moved to Hollywood in 1958, he went to East Los Angeles, to play and learn more about Latin-Jazz. He started in a charanga group with Modesto Duran as leader and played with many different groups. On November 2, 1959, he made a particularly fruitful connection within this genre when he appeared with the Hi-lo's at the First Annual Los Angeles Jazz Festival on the same bill with the already popular Latin jazz group led by vibraphonist Cal Tjader. Both his playing and arranging made an immediate impression on Tjader, who went on to employ Fischer in both capacities on several recordings over the next three years; the two would reunite in the mid-1970s, leading eventually to the formation of Fischer's own Latin jazz unit, Salsa Picante.

In 1961, Fischer became interested in Brazilian music through the recordings of Elizete Cardoso and Joao Gilberto. This discovery, coupled with his introduction to the music of Mexican composer Mario Ruiz Armengol, led to Fischer's subsequent collaboration with Cal Tjader, a 1962 LP devoted jointly to Armengol's music and that of assorted contemporary Brazilian composers. Over the following year, Fischer collaborated on two Bossa Nova-themed LPs with saxophonist Bud Shank, and arranged another for pianist George Shearing.

While with The Hi-Lo's, Fischer arranged a record by trumpeter Donald Byrd, which, by virtue of Fischer's use of strings and harps, imbued well-known standards with an unaccustomed, melancholic quality. Although it would be twenty-five years before the album was finally released, September Afternoon paid immediate dividends when Byrd played a copy for Dizzy Gillespie. In turn, Gillespie hired Fischer to write arrangements for a small ensemble featuring brass and woodwinds for his own album, A Portrait of Duke Ellington, which was well received. In 1960, albums for vibraphonist Cal Tjader and pianist George Shearing followed, as did an eight-year career of writing music for commercials, as well as the signing of Fischer's first record contract.

== Early career as a leader ==
The first recording under his own name began in 1961 with a nonet under the album name Jazz. He later recorded these for Pacific Jazz Records: First Time Out, Surging Ahead, Manteca! and Extension, plus recordings with Bud Shank and Joe Pass. These early records are meticulous studies in jazz, bossa nova and mambo, with the harmonic depth of Bach, Shostakovich and Stravinsky. They were well received by the critics, but commercially not very successful. Fischer presented himself both as pianist and arranger and composed his most famous pieces, "Pensativa" and "Morning". His many talents, however, proved a disadvantage.

Whenever I played with a trio, people said: "Fischer owes a lot to Bill Evans." Who I had never heard playing. My big musical example at the time was Lee Konitz. And when I orchestrated a record it was Gil Evans, the arranger, that I copied. I called this my "Evans Brothers syndrome".

Arrangements for Sérgio Mendes, Willy Ruff and others followed. In the 1960s, Fischer began playing the organ again, having studied the pipe organ at sixteen. He began to record on a Hammond B-3 for Pacific and on an album by Cal Tjader, Soña Libre. Years later, Fischer would record T'DAAA (1972) which showcased his skill on the Yamaha EX-42 and Clare Declares (1977) which once again featured the pipe organ.

== Salsa Picante years ==
In 1975, after ten years of studio work and artistically successful yet obscure solo records, Fischer found a new direction. Just like Hancock and Chick Corea he was a pioneer on the electric keyboard, and in that capacity he joined vibraphonist Cal Tjader's group. The reunion with Tjader gave a new impulse to Fischer's love of Latin-American music. He started his own group with Latino musicians, "Salsa Picante", which showed great eclecticism in musical styles. Later he expanded to include four vocalists billed separately as "2 + 2".

The album 2+2 won a Grammy in 1981. After that he recorded And Sometimes Voices and Free Fall with the vocal group. Free Fall was nominated in three categories for the Grammy Awards and won under the category of "Best Jazz Album By A Vocal Duo Or Group". Crazy Bird was with the instrumental group and Alone Together, a solo piano album recorded on a Hamburg Steinway. It was recorded for Hans Georg Brunner-Schwer and the German company MPS Records.

In the 1970s, Fischer began doing orchestral sweeteners for R&B groups. His nephew, André Fischer, was the drummer of the band Rufus, featuring Chaka Khan. "Apparently the arrangements I made for their early records were appreciated, for in the following years I was hired almost exclusively by black artists." Among the artists Fischer worked for are The Jacksons, Earl Klugh, Switch, Debarge, Shotgun (a late 70s offshoot of 24-Carat Black) and Atlantic Starr. His walls are now covered with gold and platinum records from these recordings, Grammy Award nominations, and several NARAS MVP Awards, culminating in an MVP-emeritus in 1985.

Once his fame as an arranger was established, Fischer also worked with pop musicians such as Paul McCartney, Prince, Celine Dion and Robert Palmer. "I am surprised that my arrangements are now considered one of the prerequisites for a hit album. People feel that they make a song sound almost classical."

Classical concert artist Richard Stoltzman commissioned him in 1983 to write a symphonic work using Duke Ellington and Billy Strayhorn themes. The result, "The Duke, Swee'pea and Me", an eleven and a half minute orchestral work, was performed with a symphony orchestra and Stoltzman on clarinet all around the world.

== Later years: jazz inspiration and pop arranger ==
Starting in 1984, Fischer wrote orchestral arrangements for pop artist Prince. Fischer's arrangements appeared both on Prince's albums and in the Prince film soundtrack music for Under the Cherry Moon (Fischer's first screen credit), Graffiti Bridge, Batman and Girl 6. Prince's 2005 single "Te Amo Corazon", a mid-tempo Latin jazz track, is one example of his collaboration with Fischer.

As a jazz educator, Fischer performed solo piano concerts and conducted clinics and master classes in universities and music conservatories in Europe and throughout the United States. In 1995, Fischer released the solo jazz piano album, Just Me, on the Concord Jazz label. In 1997, his Latin-jazz group, which featured six singers, released the album Rockin' In Rhythm on the JVC Music label.

In 1993, the Dutch jazz pianists Cor Bakker and Bert van den Brink recorded an album of Fischer compositions together entitled DeClared. In 1998, the album The Latin Side, which also featured Fischer compositions, was released by The Netherlands Metropole Orchestra (led by Rob Pronk and Vince Mendoza). Another notable recent CD with Clare is a re-issue of Art Pepper's Tokyo Debut on Galaxy (1995).

In addition to his work with Prince, Fischer provided arrangements for Michael Jackson, Amy Grant, João Gilberto, Paula Abdul, Natalie Cole, Chaka Khan and Branford Marsalis. This work enabled Fischer to record his own music with a band of twenty brass instruments called "Clare Fischer's Jazz Corps". The recordings of this band contain an arrangement of Antonio Carlos Jobim's "Corcovado". Fischer said of Jobim that "[t]he death of my friend Tom Jobim has affected me deeply. Like me, he was 68, and I am still alive. After he died I had a dream in which I was conducting his 'Corcovado'. Only it was not a normal version, there were these harmonic countermelodies in the bass. When I awoke I wrote down what I had dreamed. It became Jobim's In Memoriam, a piece I called 'Corcovado Fúnebre.'"

One of Fischer's last projects in his own name was a recording with Brazilian guitarist Hélio Delmiro called "Symbiosis" which has been released on a "Clare Fischer Productions" recording, as has his Clare Fischer's Jazz Corps recording.

In December 1999, Michigan State University School of Music conferred an Honorary Doctorate of Fine Arts Degree on Fischer in recognition of his "creativity and excellence as a jazz composer, arranger and performer".

On October 22, 2009, Manhattan School of Music's Concert Jazz Band, under the direction of Justin DiCoccio, commemorated two Clare Fischer anniversaries - both his 81st birthday and the 40th anniversary of the release of his well-regarded big band LP, Thesaurus - with a concert whose program concluded with five consecutive arrangements culled from that album. Fittingly, the five-tune sequence both began and ended, much like the album itself, with "The Duke" and "Upper Manhattan Medical Group", respectively, (Note: Much, but not exactly, like. In fact, Fischer's dynamic and uptempo arrangement of Strayhorn's "UMMG" is the album's next to last track, but what follows – the somber "In Memoriam", written for the fallen Kennedy brothers – is considered to be so far removed from the rest of the album, containing neither percussion nor improvisation and clocking in at well under two minutes, that it plays more like a postscript than part of the album proper.) Fischer's tributes to his twin jazz inspirations, Duke Ellington and Billy Strayhorn. (Note: As Fischer himself told Leonard Feather 42 years ago earlier (after having heard a track from Ellington's Far East Suite in the course of taking Down Beat's Blindfold Test), "Anything he plays is a work of art... I can't think of anybody I admire more than this man; nobody could even be compared with him, except Billy Strayhorn.") Fischer could not attend the tribute; following a medical emergency on the flight home from a family reunion in Michigan the previous year, the family had decided that air travel was "just too stressful."

== Death ==
On January 8, 2012, Fischer suffered a cardiac arrest in Los Angeles, following a minor surgery a few days before. His wife of 18 years, Donna, was at his side and performed CPR. He remained in ICU on life support, and died on January 26, 2012. He was survived by his wife; three children, Lee, Brent and Tahlia; and two stepchildren, Lisa and Bill Bachman.

== Awards and recognitions ==
=== Grammy history ===
- Career Wins: 3
- Career Nominations: 13

Year	Category	Title	Genre	Label	Result
1976	Best Instrumental Arrangement Accompanying Vocalist(s)	"Green Dolphin Street" from Feeling Free	Jazz	Pausa	Nominee
1981	Best Instrumental Arrangement Accompanying Vocalist(s)	"Du Du" from 2+2	Latin	Discovery	Nominee
1981	Best Vocal Arrangement for Two or More Voices	"Du Du" from 2+2	Latin	Discovery	Nominee
1981	Best Latin Recording	"Guajira Pa La Jeva" from 2+2	Latin	Discovery	Winner
1982	Best Vocal Arrangement for Two or More Voices	"One Night in a Dream" from And Sometimes Voices	Jazz	Discovery	Nominee
1982	Best Arrangement on an Instrumental Recording (with Earl Klugh and Ronnie Foster)	"Balladina" from Crazy for You	Pop	EMI	Nominee
1984	Best Jazz Instrumental Performance By a Group	Whose Woods Are These?	Jazz	Discovery	Nominee
1986	Best Instrumental Arrangement Accompanying Vocalist(s)	"Free Fall" from Free Fall	Jazz	Discovery	Nominee
1986	Best Jazz Fusion Performance – Vocal or Instrumental	"Free Fall" from Free Fall	Jazz	Discovery	Nominee
1996	Best Instrumental Arrangement Accompanying Vocalist(s)	"In the Still of the Night" from Lost In the Stars	Jazz	Teldec	Nominee
2011	Best Instrumental Arrangement	"In the Beginning" from Continuum	Jazz	Clare Fischer Productions	Nominee
2012	Best Latin Jazz Album	Ritmo	Latin jazz	Clare Fischer Productions	Winner (jointly with Brent Fischer)
2013	Best Instrumental Composition	"Pensiamento for Solo Alto Saxophone and Chamber Orchestra" from Music for Strings, Percussion and the Rest	Classical	Clare Fischer Productions	Winner

== Discography ==
- First Time Out (Pacific Jazz, 1962)
- Bossa Nova Jazz Samba (Pacific Jazz, 1962) with Bud Shank
- Brasamba! (Pacific Jazz, 1963) with Bud Shank and Joe Pass
- Surging Ahead (Pacific Jazz, 1963)
- Extension (Pacific Jazz, 1963)
- So Danço Samba (Pacific Jazz, 1964)
- Manteca! (Pacific Jazz, 1965)
- Easy Livin' (Revelation, 1966)
- Songs for Rainy Day Lovers (Columbia, 1967)
- One to Get Ready, Four to Go (Revelation, 1968)
- Thesaurus (Atlantic, 1969)
- Great White Hope (& his Japanese Friend) (Revelation, 1970)
- Report of the 1st Annual Symposium on Relaxed Improvisation (Revelation, 1973)
- The State of His Art (1976)
- Clare Declares (1977)
- Salsa Picante (1980)
- Alone Together (1980)
- 2+2 (1981)
- Machaca (1981)
- Remembrances (Lembranças) (1990)
- Introspectivo (2005)

== See also ==
- Brent Fischer
- Dirk Fischer
