= Swimming by Moonlight =

2025 film soundtrack album by Chet Baker

Soundtrack album by Chet Baker
- Released: November 7, 2025
- Recorded: 1986–1987
- Studio: Sage and Sound Studio,Hollywood and Studio Davout,Paris
- Genre: Jazz
- Label: Slow Down Sounds
- Producer: Bruce Weber, John Leftwich

Swimming by Moonlight is a double-album soundtrack by American jazz trumpeter and vocalist Chet Baker consisting of previously unreleased songs, music, spoken dialogue, and live concert recordings from the 1988 documentary film Let's Get Lost. The compilation was produced by Bruce Weber and John Leftwich. The album was released on November 7, 2025, by the label Slow Down Sounds.

== Track listing ==
All tracks are credited to their respective composers and lyricists as noted in the liner notes and release documentation.

=== Disc one ===
1. "Make Me Rainbows" – John Williams, Alan Bergman, Marilyn Bergman
2. "Remember" – Irving Berlin
3. "Relaxin’" – Frank Strazzeri
4. "Deep in a Dream of You (Poem)" – Joey Pecoraro
5. "I Can Dream, Can’t I?" – Sammy Fain, Irving Kahal
6. "C’est si bon" – Henri Betti, André Hornez
7. "Quiet Nights" – Antônio Carlos Jobim, Gene Lees
8. "Haunted Heart" – Arthur Schwartz, Howard Dietz
9. "I’ll Be Around" –Alec Wilder

=== Disc two ===
1. "Arbor Way" (live) – Rique Pantoja
2. "Just Friends" (live) – John Klenner, Sam M. Lewis
3. "Beatrice" (live) – Sam Rivers
4. "Milestones" (live) – Miles Davis
5. "So Hard to Know" –Rique Pantoja, Roxanne Seeman
6. "Kind of Quiet" (live) – Chet Baker
7. "Almost Blue" (live) – Elvis Costello

== See also ==
- Chet Baker discography
- Jazz soundtracks
- Let's Get Lost
