= So Hard to Know =

Song by Chet Baker

from the album Rique Pantoja & Chet Baker
- Released: 1987
- Recorded: 1985
- Studio: Estúdio Nas Nuvens
- Length: 5:41
- Label: WEA Discos
- Composer: Rique Pantoja
- Lyricist: Roxanne Seeman
- Producer: Chico Neves

Music video
- "So Hard To Know" on YouTube

"So Hard To Know" is a song recorded by American jazz trumpeter and vocalist Chet Baker written by Roxanne Seeman and Rique Pantoja. It appears in Let's Get Lost, the 1988 Oscar-nominated documentary about the life and career of Baker directed by Bruce Weber and in the Chet Baker Performs & Sings: Swimming by Moonlight OST released November 7, 2025.

The song was recorded by Baker in Rio de Janeiro, Brazil with Baker singing and playing trumpet as a duo with Pantoja. It was included in the album Rique Pantoja & Chet Baker released by WEA Latina in 1987.

== Background ==
In 1954, Baker decided to perform and record as both trumpet player and singer, reserving space for vocal productions on album recordings in the US and Europe." In 1966, Baker had an artistic collaboration with Brazilian pianist João Donato playing and singing Brazilian compositions as a guest of Donato, who was in the US performing for a season at a nightclub in Sausalito, California.

In the early '80's, Chet Baker met Brazilian jazz and bossa nova pianist and composer Rique Pantoja while both were playing nightclubs in Paris near each other. Baker dropped in to hear Pantoja playing, which developed into an artistic collaboration with Pantoja composing songs for Baker to record and Baker inviting Pantoja to tour with him.

Upon returning to Brazil, Pantoja arranged for Baker to play at the Free Jazz Festival in Rio de Janeiro in 1985, during which time Pantoja planned to record an album with Baker and composed instrumental compositions along with a song which would have lyrics for Baker to sing.

Pantoja recorded the song idea on a cassette, which was delivered by hand to Roxanne Seeman in Los Angeles, to write the lyrics. Seeman wrote the lyrics in Los Angeles and telephoned them to Pantoja, for Chet Baker to record in Brasil, while Baker was in Rio de Janeiro to perform in the Free Jazz Festival, 1985.

== Composition and style ==
In an LA Times interview, Pantoja described his style of composition as a mix of "Brazilian rhythm with a jazz feeling" with "some room for improvisation." Luís Nassif of GGN called Baker a "romantic...owner of a fragile, delicate, almost whispering voice." Baker's style of singing was said to have influenced the Brazilian style. Gerry Peary, Entertainment News Service wrote: "Weber recalled a birthday party he attended, where Baker sat in on trumpet behind an awed, suddenly timid vocalist, Astrud Gilberto."

Correio Braziliense described Baker's vocal style as "economic virtuosity"...with "decisive influences of bossa nova, both in the way of playing and singing"..."economically, softly, almost whispering".

== Critical reception ==
"Baker's horn work is clear bright and even upbeat. The same goes for his vocals on 'So Hard to Know'." Arnaldo Desouteiro of Jazz Station called it a "haunting ballad". David Steinberg for the Albuquerque Journal wrote, "Baker said his phrasing as a trumpeter influenced his phrasing as a singer and had he not taken up the trumpet he may not have sang. Listeners will be pleased he got lost in his music."

== Production ==
"So Hard To Know" by Chet Baker was produced and recorded in Brazil by Chico Neves. It was recorded on 206 2" Scotch tape. The analog master tape remained unplayed for almost 30 years, at which time it was transcribed from analog to digital by Anderson Guerra at Bunker Discos, Belo Horizonte, Minas Gerais, Brazil.

== Credits and personnel ==
- Bass – Sizão Machado
- Drums – Bob Wyatt
- Piano, Synthesizer – Rique Pantoja
- Trumpet, Vocals – Chet Baker
- Producer – Chico Neves

== Let's Get Lost ==
Let's Get Lost Chet Baker documentary film directed by Bruce Weber DVD cover

Chet Baker brought "So Hard To Know" to Bruce Weber for use in the documentary while they were filming. It appears in a scene where Chet Baker is in the backseat of a convertible car, with a woman at either side, riding down the Pacific Coast Highway in California.

Let's Get Lost was released on VHS and Laserdisc in Japan on November 21, 1993. It was originally going to be released on DVD in 2007 along with an expanded version of the film's soundtrack.

The DVD was released in the UK on July 28, 2008, and in the US by on December 3, 2013. The Blu-ray was released in Italy.

Let’s Get Lost was released in France as a 2-DVD + 1-CD deluxe package. It includes the complete movie remastered in High Definition (DVD 1) plus a second DVD titled Les Compléments, with bonus extra including a making-of ("À la recherche de Chet Baker") that ends with "So Hard To Know".

=== Chain of Desire ===
"So Hard To Know" appears in the film Chain of Desire starring Malcolm McDowell.
