= Crying Time (album) =

Studio album by Ray Charles
- Released: February 1966
- Recorded: R.P.M. International, Los Angeles, California
- Genre: R&B, soul, country
- Length: 39:44
- Label: ABC Paramount / Tangerine
- Producer: Joe Adams

Ray Charles chronology
Together Again (1965)	Crying Time (1966)	Ray's Moods (1966)

Singles from Crying Time
- 1. "Crying Time" Released: November 1965; 2. "Let's Go Get Stoned" Released: May 1966

Professional ratings
Review scores
Source	Rating
AllMusic	3/5 stars
Record Mirror	4/5 stars

Crying Time is a studio album by Ray Charles, released in February 1966 as the first release on his label Tangerine, which was distributed by ABC Paramount.

== Chart performance ==
The album debuted on Billboard magazine's Top LP's chart in the issue dated March 12, 1966, peaking at No. 15 during a thirty-six-week run on the chart.

== Track listing ==
LP side A

1. "Crying Time" (Buck Owens) – 2:57
2. "No Use Crying" (Roy Gaines, Freddie Lee Kober, J.B. Daniels) – 3:17
3. "Let's Go Get Stoned" (Valerie Simpson, Nickolas Ashford, Jo Armstead) – 3:00
4. "Going Down Slow" (Jimmy Oden) – 4:03
5. "Peace of Mind" (Ray Charles, J. Holiday) – 2:14
6. "Tears" (Norman Newell, Robert Maxwell) – 4:38

LP side B

1. "Drifting Blues" (Johnny Moore, Eddie Williams, Charles Brown) – 6:24
2. "We Don't See Eye to Eye" (Percy Mayfield) – 2:21
3. "You're In for a Big Surprise" (Percy Mayfield) – 3:35
4. "You're Just About to Lose Your Clown" (Johnny MacRae) – 2:01
5. "Don't You Think I Ought to Know" (William Johnson, Melvin Wettergreen) – 3:05
6. "You've Got a Problem" (William D. Weeks, Freddy James) – 3:28

== Personnel ==
- Ray Charles – piano, vocals
- Billy Preston – electric organ on "No Use Crying", "Let's Go Get Stoned"
- Joe Adams – producer
- William Alexander – album cover artist
- George S. Whiteman – album cover design
- Joe Lebow – liner notes
- The Raelettes – performer
- Onzy Matthews – arranger
- Donald Peake – guitar

== Charts ==
Chart (1966)	Peak position
US Billboard Top LP's	15
US Top Selling R&B LP's (Billboard)	1

== See also ==
- List of number-one R&B albums of 1966 (U.S.)
