= Chivas Jazz Festival =

Jazz festival in Brazil

Chivas Jazz Festival Chivas Jazz Festival
- Status: Defunct
- Genre: Jazz Festival
- Venue: DirecTV Music Hall, São Paulo; Marina da Glória, Rio de Janeiro
- Country: Brazil
- Inaugurated: 2000
- Most recent: 2004
- Leader: Toy Lima
- Sponsor: Souza Cruz

Chivas Jazz Festival (Portuguese: Chivas Jazz Festival) was a jazz festival held annually from 2000 to 2005 in Brazil, known for high-quality stricto sensu jazz. It was one of two annual jazz festivals in Brazil when it was launched, and for some time was the only such festival. It featured many well-known international jazz musicians, and was known for its insistence on true jazz, avoiding other forms of popular music. In 2005 a change in sponsorship led to a change in name to the Playboy Jazz Festival Brasil.

== History ==
The Chivas Jazz Festival was one of two annual jazz festivals in Brazil, the other being the Free Jazz Festival. (Note: The Free Jazz Festival was held annually from 1985 to 2001, sponsored by the tobacco company Souza Cruz. "Free" is one of their cigarette brands.) The Free Jazz Festival was forced to close due to the anti-smoking laws, leaving the Chivas Jazz Festival as the main festival. The name is associated with the "Chivas" whiskey brand of Pernod Ricard. The Chivas Jazz Festival was held for five consecutive seasons, organised by businessman Toy Lima. From the first edition of the festival there was a strong turnout, showing that Brazil has a loyal following of high-quality jazz. The festival gained a reputation for pure jazz, with no pop artists. It also made a point of introducing artists who might not yet be known to the audience. It became known as the most consistent jazz festival in Latin America.

The Chivas Jazz Festival was discontinued after the 2004 edition, to be replaced by the Playboy Jazz Festival Brasil, associated with Playboy magazine. Toy Lima continued as organiser. The first Playboy Jazz Festival Brasil was to be held in August 2005, as part of the magazine's 30th anniversary celebrations. Playboy had been putting on the Playboy Jazz Festival in Los Angeles for 25 years.

== Performers ==
=== 1st edition ===
The first edition of the Chivas Jazz Festival opened in the Palace in São Paulo on 1 June 2000, organised by Toy Lima. New lighting had been installed in the theatre, and the number of seats reduced from 1,700 to 1,100 in an effort to create a more intimate setting. Featured artists included Regina Carter (violin) and her quintet including James Carter (saxophone); and the David Murray Quartet: David Murray (saxophone), Dave Burrell (piano), Ray Drummond (bass) and Andrew Cyrille (drums). Other performers were Stefon Harris (vibraphone), Don Byron (clarinet), Charlie Hunter (guitar), Steve Lacy (saxophone), Mal Waldron (piano) and Geri Allen (piano).

=== 2nd edition ===
The 2nd edition of Chivas Jazz Festival was held in 2001 at the Directv Music Hall in São Paulo and the Garden Hall in Rio de Janeiro, playing at both venues from 6 to 9 June 2001. Saxophonist Archie Shepp, considered one of the greatest theoreticians of modern jazz, headlined the festival. Other leading musicians were Bill Frisell and vocalist Carmen Lundy. The only two Brazilians at the event were the saxophonist Mauro Senise and drummer Tutty Moreno. A TV film of the 2nd edition featured,

- Steve Turre and his Group: Steve Turre (trombone, shells), Javon Jackson (tenor sax), George Cables (piano), Buster Williams (bass), Victor Lewis (drums)
- The Carmen Lundy Quartet: Carmen Lundy (vocal, arranger), Allan Gumbs (piano), Curtis Lundy (double bass), Victor Lewis (drums)
- The Tutty Moreno Quarteto: Nailor Proveta (alto sax, clarinet), André Mehmari (piano), Rodolfo Stroeter (double bass), Tutty Moreno (drums)
- The Mauro Senise Quarteto: Mauro Senise (alto sax, flute), Hugo Fattoruso (piano, keyboards), Paulo Russo (double bass), Ivan Conti (drums)
- The Archie Shepp Quartet: Archie Shepp (tenor sax, vocal), Tom McClung (piano), Wayne Dockery (double bass), Steve McCraven (drums)
- The Bill Frisell Quartet: Bill Frisell (electric guitar), Greg Leisz (mandolin), David Piltch (acoustic double bass, electric double bass), Kenny Wollesen (drums)
- The Dave Holland Quintet: Robin Eubanks (trombone), Chris Potter (soprano sax, alto sax, tenor sax), Steve Nelson (vibraphone, marimba), Dave Holland (acoustic double bass), Billy Kilson (drums}
- The Dave Douglas Sextet: Dave Douglas (trumpet, Joshua Roseman (trombone), Gregory Tardy (tenor sax, clarinet), Uri Caine (piano), James Genus (acoustic double bass), Ben Perowsky (drums)

=== 3rd edition ===
The 3rd edition of the festival was held on 22–25 May 2002 in São Paulo and Rio de Janeiro. In Rio de Janeiro it was held in the Marina da Glória, near the Modern Art Museum. The show was filmed for presentation on TV in Spain and Brazil. The festival featured jazz musicians from 13 countries in Africa, Europe, the Middle East, the Caribbean and South America, besides the US. Performers included pianists Jean-Michel Pilc (France), Abdullah Ibrahim (South Africa), Nathalie Loriers (Belgium) and Fred Hersch (US), saxophonists Chico Freeman (US), Dave Liebman (US) and Dewey Redman (US), bassist Avishai Cohen (Israel), trumpeter Paolo Fresu (Italy) and singer Luciana Souza (Brazil).

=== 4th edition ===
The 4th edition was held in São Paulo and Rio on 28–31 May 2003, with shows in both cities on each day. The performers appeared on different days at the Marina da Glória in Rio de Janeiro and the DirecTV Music Hall in São Paulo. The 4th edition featured a night dedicated to the pianist and composer Dom Salvador, returning to Brazil after thirty years. Dom Salvador was born in São Paulo but established his career in New York. Other performers were saxophonist Arthur Blythe, drummer Paul Motian and his Electric Bebob Band, saxophonist Lee Konitz, who recorded "the Birth of Cool" with Miles Davis, pianist Paul Bley and the singer Mary Stallings. For the shows in Brazil, Lee Konitz was accompanied by nine musicians who make up the Talmor Nonet. Younger musicians included pianist Jason Moran and his trio, and the saxophonist Eric Alexander.

=== 5th edition ===
The 5th edition was held at the DirecTV Music Hall in São Paulo and the Marina da Glória in Rio on 5–8 May 2004. Sheila Jordan opened the show in São Paulo accompanied first by the pianist Andrew Hill and then by the Steve Kuhn Trio. Performers included,

- Andrew Hill Trio: Andrew Hill (piano), John Hebert (bass), Nasheet Waits (drums)
- Sheila Jordan & Steve Kuhn Trio: Sheila Jordan (vocals), Steve Kuhn (piano), David Finck (bass), Billy Drummond (drums)
- Bud Shank Quartet: Bud Shank (sax), Bill Mays (piano), Bob Magnusson (bass), Joe Labarbera (drums)
- Louis Hayes & Cannonball Adderley Legacy Band: Louis Hayes (drums), Jeremy Pelt (trumpet), Vincent Herring (sax), Rick Germanson (piano), Vicente Archer (bass)
- Richard Galliano & French Touch Quartet: Richard Galliano (accordion), Joel Xavier (guitar), Jean Phillipe Viret (bass), Jean Luc Danna (drums)
- The Sun Ra Arkestra: Marshall Allen (sax, flute), Charles Davis (sax), Art Jenkins (vocals, percussion), Tyrone Hill (trombone), Michael Ray (vocals, trumpet), Fred Adams (trumpet), Rey Scott (baritone sax), Vincent Chancey (french horn), John Ore (bass) and others
- Tom Harrell Quintet: Tom Harrell (trumpet), Marcus Strickland (sax), Xavier Davis (piano), Ugonna Okegwo (electric guitar), Quincy Davis (drums)
- Raul de Souza & Quinteto: Raul de Souza (trombone), Mário Conde (guitar), Jeff Sabag (piano), Glauco Solter (bass), Endrigo Bettega (drums)
- Bobby Previte's Bump, The Renaissance Band: Bobby Previte (drums), Marty Ehrlich (tenor sax), Wayne Horwitz (piano), Curtis Fowlkes (trombone), Steve Swallow (electric guitar)

== Sources ==
- Carlos Calado (1 June 2001), "Sem concessões, 2º Chivas Jazz Festival não se rende ao pop", Folha de S.Paulo (in Portuguese)
- Carlos Calado (8 March 2002), "Terceira edição do Chivas Jazz Festival reunirá músicos de 13 países", Folha de S.Paulo (in Portuguese)
- Chivas Jazz Festival apresenta sua 5a edição, no DirecTV Music Hall, dias 05, 06, 07 e 08 de maio (in Portuguese), BaresSP, 29 April 2004
- "Chivas Jazz Festival", Istoé (in Portuguese), Editora Três, 30 May 2001
- "Começa o quinto Chivas Jazz Festival", Diário do Grande ABC (in Portuguese), 4 May 2004
- David Meeker, "CHIVAS JAZZ FESTIVAL 2003 [motion picture]", Jazz on the Screen
- David Meeker (b), "Chivas Jazz Festival 2001", Jazz on the Screen
- Donizete Costa; Denis Moreira (2003), "Chivas Jazz reúne grandes nomes do gênero no Rio e em São Paulo", Diário de S.Paulo (in Portuguese)
- Helton Ribeiro (6 May 2004), No Chivas Jazz, Sheila Jordan derrete-se pelo Brasil (in Portuguese), Reuters
- Marco Antonio Barbosa (7 June 2001), "Eles são o Brasil no Chivas Jazz", Clique Music (in Portuguese)
- Mona Gadelha (2003), "Chivas Jazz Festival promete Noites Históricas", ejazz (in Portuguese), archived from the original on 2016-12-21
- "Playboy Jazz Festival Brasil substitui Chivas Jazz", Propmark (in Portuguese), 17 November 2004
- "Regina Carter abre o 1º Chivas Jazz Festival, em SP", Diário do Grande ABC (in Portuguese), 31 May 2000
- Third Annual Chivas Jazz Festival, Allaboutjazz.com
- "Várias gerações no Chivas Jazz Festival", ObaOba (in Portuguese)
