= Chain of Desire =

1992 film by Temístocles López

- Film poster
- Directed by: Temístocles López
- Written by: Temístocles López
- Produced by: Brian Cox; José Luis Garci
- Starring: Linda Fiorentino; Elias Koteas; Tim Guinee; Grace Zabriskie; Assumpta Serna; Patrick Bauchau; Seymour Cassell; Malcolm McDowell; Ricky Middleton
- Cinematography: Nancy Schreiber
- Edited by: Suzanne Fenn
- Music by: Nathan Birnbaum
- Production company: Distant Horizon
- Distributed by: Mad Dog Pictures
- Release dates: November 1992 (Turin Film Festival); June 25, 1993 (U.S.)
- Running time: 107 minutes
- Country: United States
- Language: English

Chain of Desire is a 1992 American drama romance film written and directed by Temístocles López. It is a modern American remake of the film La Ronde. The film was presented at the Turin Film Festival in November 1992 and was released in the United States on June 25, 1993.

== Plot ==
A series of unrelated amorous lovers are connected by a chain of desire. It begins when a woman named Alma flees from a would-be lover. She runs into a church, where she meets a man named Jesus and they eventually have sex.

Jesus goes home to wife Isa and they have sex. Isa leaves for an appointment with Dr. Buckley, with whom she is having an affair. Buckley then visits Linda, a dominatrix. Linda goes home to husband Hubert, a television commentator. Hubert has sex without her knowledge with a male teen, Keith.

Keith is introduced to exotic dancer Diana, who then has a fling with a much older artist, Mel. He goes home to an angry wife, Cleo. And that night, all of these people end up at a nightclub where Alma is performing. Alma has just learned that the lover she fled has been diagnosed with AIDS.

== Cast ==
- Holly Marie Combs as Diana
- Mickey Cottrell as Procurer
- Malcolm McDowell as Hubert Bailey
- Linda Fiorentino as Alma D'Angeli
- Elias Koteas as Jesus
- Angel Aviles as Isa
- Patrick Bauchau as Jerald Buckley
- Grace Zabriskie as Linda Bailey
- Jamie Harrold as Keith
- Tim Guinee as Ken
- Dewey Weber as David Bango
- Seymour Cassel as Mel
- Assumpta Serna as Cleo
- Kevin Conroy as Joe
- Suzzanne Douglas as Angie
- Joseph McKenna as M.C
- Karole Armitage as Dancer
- Michael Puler as Dancer
- Rachel Tucker as Dancer
- Antonia Rey as Jesus' Mother
- Sabrina Lloyd as Melissa
- Ricky Middleton as Man At Club (Uncredited)

== Soundtrack ==
The film score was composed by Nathan Birnbaum with additional music by Peter Gordon.

The Chet Baker song "So Hard To Know", written by Roxanne Seeman and Rique Pantoja, appears in the film.

== Reception ==
On review aggregate website Rotten Tomatoes, Chain of Desire has an approval rating of 60% based on 5 reviews.

Richard Harrington of The Washington Post remarked the film "is an odd mix: an American update of Max Ophüls's The Circle, a sexual Slackers and an MTV-style public service announcement on AIDS stretched out to 105 minutes of tragicomedy with a heavy-handed message that works emotionally, but not at all logically." Harrington critiqued the film’s lack of character development and concluded "in trying to create a democracy of victims who casually cross sexual, ethnic and economic lines, Lopez ends up creating unamusing comedy and unmoving tragedy. As an erotic morality play, it's about as convincing as Madonna's last record."

== Nominations ==
- Nancy Schreiber: 1993 Independent Spirit Award - Best Cinematography (Nominated)
