= Chet Baker Sings =

Studio album by Chet Baker
- Released: April/May 1954
- Recorded: February 15, 1954
- Genres: West Coast jazz, cool jazz, vocal jazz
- Length: 43:55 LP/CD reissue
- Label: Pacific Jazz
- Producer: Richard Bock

Chet Baker chronology
Witch Doctor (1953)	Chet Baker Sings (1954)	Grey December (1953–55)

Professional ratings
Review scores
Source	Rating
AllMusic	4.5/5 stars
The Penguin Guide to Jazz Recordings	3.5/4 stars

Chet Baker Sings is the debut vocal album by jazz musician Chet Baker, released in 1954 by Pacific Jazz Records. In 2001, the album received the Grammy Hall of Fame Award. Baker would return to selections from this album throughout his career. "My Funny Valentine" was regularly included in his concert performances and is considered by some to be his signature song.

== Background ==
Until this album, Baker was almost exclusively an instrumentalist. His mother had loved his singing voice and asked him for years to sing more. He eventually sang on two tracks in October 1953: "I Fall in Love Too Easily" and "The Thrill is Gone". Baker then requested to record a full album of his singing, to the skepticism of his producer Dick Bock.

He recorded this album in Hollywood. Russ Freeman selected several of the songs for Baker to sing. According to James Gavin, Bock was alarmed as Baker struggled to sing in key, and he reportedly had to make numerous takes on every song. Despite this, Baker remained persistent, to the chagrin of the background musicians. Freeman later said, "I thought it was bullshit. Louis Armstrong and Jack Teagarden sang like jazz singers. This was ballads. Totally meaningless."

Baker's later wife Ruth Young said of his singing:

None of these songs had any meaning for him, truly. He could have been singing Charmin commercials. He was coming from a musical place, and the words were mere notes to him.

== Track listing ==
=== Original LP (Pacific PJLP-11) ===
Side one:

1. ""But Not for Me"" – 3:04
2. "Time After Time" – 2:46
3. "My Funny Valentine" – 2:21
4. "I Fall in Love Too Easily" – 3:21

Side two:

1. "There Will Never Be Another You" – 3:00
2. "I Get Along Without You Very Well (Except Sometimes)" – 2:59
3. "The Thrill Is Gone" – 2:51
4. "Look for the Silver Lining" – 2:39

=== 1956 LP reissue (Pacific PJ-1222) ===
This issue features additional tracks 1–6, which were recorded on July 23 and 30, 1956.

Side one
No.	Title	Writer(s)	Length
1.	"That Old Feeling"	Lew Brown, Sammy Fain	3:03
2.	"It's Always You"	Jimmy Van Heusen, Johnny Burke	3:35
3.	"Like Someone in Love"	Jimmy Van Heusen, Johnny Burke	2:26
4.	"My Ideal"	Newell Chase, Leo Robin, Richard A. Whiting	4:22
5.	"I've Never Been in Love Before"	Frank Loesser	4:29
6.	"My Buddy"	Walter Donaldson, Gus Kahn	3:19

Side two
No.	Title	Writer(s)	Length
7.	"But Not for Me"	George Gershwin, Ira Gershwin	3:04
8.	"Time After Time"	Jule Styne, Sammy Cahn	2:46
9.	"I Get Along Without You Very Well (Except Sometimes)"	Hoagy Carmichael	2:59
10.	"My Funny Valentine"	Richard Rodgers, Lorenz Hart	2:21
11.	"There Will Never Be Another You"	Harry Warren, Mack Gordon	3:00
12.	"The Thrill Is Gone"	Lew Brown, Ray Henderson	2:51
13.	"I Fall in Love Too Easily"	Jule Styne, Sammy Cahn	3:21
14.	"Look for the Silver Lining"	Jerome Kern, Buddy DeSylva	2:39

== Personnel ==
- Chet Baker – vocals, trumpet
- Russ Freeman – piano, celesta (both 1954 and 1956 tracks)
- Carson Smith – double bass
- Joe Mondragon – double bass
- Bob Neel – drums
- Jimmy Bond – double bass (1956 tracks)
- Larance Marable – drums (1956 tracks)
- Peter Littman – drums (1956 tracks)

=== Production ===
- Richard Bock – producer
- Gerald Heard – liner notes
- William Claxton – photography

== Critical reception ==
The reception towards the album, and Baker's singing voice in general, was highly polarized around the album's release.

Critics called his voice "fey" and "effete". A biographer for Baker described his voice as "androgynously sweet" and "fragile". The perception of his voice conflicted with the social standards of the era, where gender roles were rigid and homophobia was rampant. It also conflicted with the macho stereotypes of male jazz singers, with examples of Billy Eckstine and Louis Armstrong. Baker later said in 1973:

"There was a very mixed reaction when I started singing. In the first place, a lot of people thought — foolishly so — that because of the way I sang, I, y'know, liked fellars [sic] or something. I can only say that that's a lot of bullshit."

According to James Gavin, Baker tried to counteract this by emphasizing his masculinity. He talked frequently about cars and the women in his life and was known to use the homophobic slur "faggot". Despite Baker's intentions, according to James Gavin, the album made Baker the first jazz musician with a "strong homosexual following". The singer-songwriter Cherry Vanilla claimed the album was a hit in the gay community. She said "All the gay boys who were into jazz at all were into him."

Some critics commented on Baker's singing ability, regardless of its perceived gendered qualities. In Metronome, Mimi Clar Melnick criticized Baker's "abysmal vocal deficiencies" and compared his singing to "a four-month-old baby's lack of coordination because he can't walk".

Despite these criticisms, the album was a financial success. In 1956, Bock expanded the album to 14 tracks and a 12 inch rerelease. The additional six tracks were recorded at the Forum Theatre in Los Angeles. The only returning musician on the recording was Russ Freeman; Jimmy Bond played bass, Peter Littman and Lawrence Marable played the drums.

It was also a significant boost to Baker's fame. It was highly popular among women; Dick Bock conducted a Pacific Jazz Records marketing survey in 1955 and found that most of Baker's fans were women who wanted to hear him sing. In the year of the album's release, audience polls in DownBeat Magazine's named him the best trumpeter and best vocalist, above Miles Davis and Nat King Cole respectively. Afterwards, Charlie Parker told Davis and Dizzy Gillespie, "You better watch out... There's a little white cat out in California that's gonna eat you up." Soon afterwards, Baker was cast for a part in the film Hell's Horizon.

== Legacy ==
The album has since become Baker's consistent best seller and one of his most famous. Its success led to a sequel in the next year, Chet Baker Sings and Plays.

A number of later musicians have mentioned the album as a source of inspiration. In 2022, singer-songwriter Amos Lee made his own cover of "My Funny Valentine" that was directly inspired by the cover on the album and released the covers album My Ideal: A Tribute to Chet Baker Sings.

It was a significant inspiration to the bossa nova genre of music and Brazilian music as a whole. It inspired Carlos Lyra, Roberto Menescal, Nara Leão, Oscar Castro-Neves, and João Gilberto. In particular, Gilberto took direct inspiration from Baker's cover of "Like Someone in Love", and produced his own cover of the song. When Baker later performed in Brazil in August 1980, he was reportedly unaware and surprised that his album had made such an impact there.

In 2016, it was reported that original 1954 10" pressings and 1956 Pacific Jazz LP pressings of the album sold for between $50 and $200.

== Charts ==
Chart performance for Chet Baker Sings
Chart (2020–2026)	Peak position
French Jazz Albums (SNEP)	13
Swedish Jazz Albums (Sverigetopplistan)	2
UK Jazz & Blues Albums (Official Charts) 1998 reissue	16
UK Jazz & Blues Albums (Official Charts) 2021 reissue	21
