= Frank Strazzeri =

American jazz pianist

- Born: April 24, 1930; Rochester, New York, U.S.
- Died: May 9, 2014 (aged 84) Rochester, New York
- Genres: Jazz
- Occupation: Musician
- Instrument: Piano
- Years active: 1950s–2010s
- Labels: Revelation, Fresh Sound

Frank Strazzeri (April 24, 1930 – May 9, 2014) was an American jazz pianist.

== Career ==
Strazzeri began on tenor saxophone and clarinet at age 12, then switched to piano soon after. He attended the Eastman School of Music, then took a job as a house pianist in a nightclub in Rochester in 1952. While there he accompanied visiting musicians such as Roy Eldridge and Billie Holiday.

He moved to New Orleans in 1954, playing with Sharkey Bonano and Al Hirt in a Dixieland jazz setting, but his focus since then was on bebop. He played with Charlie Ventura in 1957–58 and Woody Herman in 1959 before moving to Los Angeles in 1960.

There he worked extensively as a studio musician on the West Coast jazz scene, and toured with Joe Williams, Maynard Ferguson, and Les Brown. He also toured with Elvis Presley in June 1972, including four Madison Square Garden shows in New York, and the following January for the "Aloha from Hawaii" worldwide telecast.

He worked with Terry Gibbs, Herb Ellis, the Lighthouse All-Stars, Art Pepper, Bud Shank, Cal Tjader, Louie Bellson, and Chet Baker, in addition to recording as a leader. He died at the age of 84 on May 9, 2014.

== Discography ==
=== As leader ===
- That's Him and This Is New (Revelation, 1969)
- Taurus (Revelation, 1973)
- View from Within with Don Menza (Creative World, 1973)
- Frames with Don Menza (Glendale, 1975)
- After the Rain with Sam Most and Bobby Shew (Catalyst, 1976)
- Straz (Catalyst, 1977)
- Relaxin' (Sea Breeze, 1980)
- Kat Dancin' (Discovery, 1985)
- Make Me Rainbows (Fresh Sound, 1987)
- I Remember You (Fresh Sound, 1989)
- Little Giant (Fresh Sound, 1989)
- The Very Thought of You (Discovery, 1990)
- Wood Winds West (Jazz Mark, 1992)
- Frank's Blues (Night Life, 1992)
- Moon and Sand (Discovery, 1993)
- Somebody Loves Me (Fresh Sound, 1994)
- Nobody Else But Me (Fresh Sound, 1997)
- Funk and Esoteric (Fresh Sound, 2004)

=== As sideman ===
With Curtis Amy

- Groovin' Blue (Pacific Jazz, 1961) with Frank Butler

With Chet Baker

- Let's Get Lost (RCA Novus, 1987)

With Carmell Jones

- The Remarkable Carmell Jones (Pacific Jazz, 1961)

With the Red Mitchell-Harold Land Quintet

- Hear Ye! (Atlantic, 1962)
