= Together Again (Ray Charles album) =

Together Again / Country and Western Meets Rhythm and Blues

Studio album by Ray Charles
- Released: 1965
- Recorded: 1965
- Genres: R&B, soul, country soul
- Label: ABC 520
- Producer: Sid Feller

Ray Charles chronology
Live in Concert (1965)	Together Again / Country and Western Meets Rhythm and Blues (1965)	Crying Time (1966)

Alternative cover/title

Professional ratings
Review scores
Source	Rating
AllMusic	3/5 stars
Billboard	(favorable)

Together Again, also known as Country and Western Meets Rhythm and Blues, is a studio album by Ray Charles released in 1965 by ABC-Paramount Records.

== Chart performance ==
The album debuted on Billboard magazine's Top LP's chart in the issue dated September 11, 1965, peaking at No. 116 during a seven-week run on the chart.

== Track listing ==
1. "Together Again" (Buck Owens) – 2:41
2. "I Like to Hear It Sometime" (Joe Edwards) – 2:55
3. "I've Got a Tiger By the Tail" (Buck Owens, Harlan Howard) – 2:12
4. "Please Forgive and Forget" (Ray Charles) – 3:48
5. "I Don't Care" (Buck Owens) – 2:17
6. "Next Door to the Blues" (Leroy Kirkland, Pearl Woods) – 2:56
7. "Blue Moon of Kentucky" (Bill Monroe) – 2:10
8. "Light out of Darkness" (Ray Charles, Rick Ward) – 3:28
9. "Maybe It's Nothing at All" (Joe Edwards) – 3:12
10. "All Night Long" (Curtis R. Lewis) – 3:06
11. "Don't Let Her Know" (Bonnie Owens, Buck Owens, Don Rich) – 2:54
12. "Watch It Baby" (Percy Mayfield) – 2:48

== Personnel ==
- Ray Charles – piano, vocals
- The Jack Halloran Singers – backing vocals
- The Raelettes – backing vocals
- Onzy Matthews – arranger

== Charts ==
Chart (1965)	Peak position
US Billboard Top LPs	116
