= So che ti perderò =

The back cover of the 1962 45 single release in Italy by RCA Victor.

"So che ti perderò" or "I Know I Will Lose You" is a 1962 jazz song composed by Chet Baker. The song was released as a B side single in 1962 in Italy.

== Background ==
"So che ti perderò" or "I Know I Will Lose You" was released as a 45 single in Italy by RCA Records in June, 1962 as PM 45–3068 in mono backed with "Chetty's Lullaby" as part of the Serie Europa or European Series. The track was recorded during the Chet Is Back! sessions for RCA in Rome at RCA's studios in the spring of 1962. Ennio Morricone was the conductor and arranger. The choir on the session is The Swingers. The track was released as a bonus track on the Chet is Back! CD release by RCA in 2003 in the U.S. Chet Baker plays the trumpet and also sings on the track. The song was only released in Italy as a vinyl 7" 45 picture sleeve single. The lyrics are in Italian. Chet Baker composed the music. Alessandro Maffei wrote the lyrics. Maffei also wrote the lyrics to "Chetty's Lullaby", a song dedicated to Chet Baker's son.

"So che di perderò"" appeared on the soundtrack of the 1988 Academy Award-nominated documentary film Let's Get Lost.

The recording was also featured on the 1999 compilation box set The Ennio Morricone Chronicles on BMG International. A Various Artists LP compilation produced by Italian RCA, Passaporto per l'Italia, RCA PML 10319, released on 1962, included "So che ti perderò" and "Il mio domani", the 45 single B sides.

In August, 1960, Chet Baker was arrested in Lucca, Italy. He was convicted of drug smuggling and forgery and sentenced to a year, seven months, and ten days in a Lucca prison. When he was released early, in December, 1961, RCA Italiana organized collaborative sessions with composer, arranger, and conductor Ennio Morricone. In 1962, they recorded four of Chet Baker's own compositions that he wrote while incarcerated: "Chetty's Lullaby", "So che ti perderò", "Il mio domani", and "Motivo su raggio di luna".

== Other recordings ==
Sue Richardson recorded the song on the 2013 Chet Baker tribute album, Too Cool: The Life and Music of Chet Baker, on Splash Point. June Bisantz recorded the song on the album, It's Always You: June Bisantz Sings Chet Baker, Vol. 2, in 2015.

== Sources ==
- Baker, Chet. As Though I Had Wings: The Lost Memoir. St. Martin's Press, 1997.
- De Valk, Jeroen. Chet Baker: His Life and Music. Berkeley Hills Books, 2000.
- Gavin, James. Deep in a Dream: The Long Night of Chet Baker. 2011.
- Rouy, Gérard. Chet Baker. Paris: Editions du limon, 1992.
- Ruddick, Matthew. Funny Valentine: The Story of Chet Baker. Melrose Books, 2012.
