= Rique Pantoja & Chet Baker =

Studio album by Rique Pantoja and Chet Baker
- Released: October 17, 1987
- Recorded: 1985
- Genre: Jazz
- Length: 31:02
- Label: WEA
- Producer: Chico Neves

Chet Baker chronology
As Time Goes By (1987)	Rique Pantoja & Chet Baker (1987)	Let's Get Lost (1987)

Rique Pantoja & Chet Baker is an album by trumpeter/vocalist Chet Baker and Brazilian composer and pianist Rique Pantoja produced by Chico Neves and Rique Pantoja. The album was recorded by Chico Neves and Iro Barreto with recording sessions taking place at Studio Pollicino in 1984 in Rome, Studio Nas Nuvens in 1985 in Rio de Janeiro, when Chet Baker came to Brazil to play at the Free Jazz Festival, and Studio Audio Patrulba in 1987 in São Paulo. It was mixed by Iro Barreto, Zeziabo Matarelli and Rique Pantoja and released on the WEA Discos label in Brazil in 1987, the Pony Canyon label in Japan on July 21, 1989 and the Warner Music Latina label in the US in 1989.

== Reception ==
Professional ratings
Review scores
Source	Rating
AllMusic	4/5 stars
The Rolling Stone Jazz Record Guide	3/5 stars

The AllMusic review by Ron Wynn stated: "Baker was dominant musical personality, Pantoja provided Latin background."

David Steinberg for the Albuquerque Journal wrote: "On this album Baker evokes a rich sound."

== Track listing ==
1. "Cinema 1" (Rique Pantoja) – 5:23
2. "Saci" (Rique Pantoja) – 4:26
3. "Arborway" (Rique Pantoja) – 5:27
4. "So Hard to Know" (Rique Pantoja, Roxanne Seeman) – 5:43
5. "Te Cantei" (Rique Pantoja) – 5:19
6. "Depois Da Praia" (Rique Pantoja) – 4:44

== Personnel ==
- Chet Baker – trumpet, vocals
- Rique Pantoja – piano, synthesizer
- Sizao Machado – bass guitar
- Roberto Gatto – drums
- Mauro Senise – flute on "Depois Da Praia"
