= Let's Get Lost (song) =

Jazz standard written by Jimmy McHugh and Frank Loesser

"Let's Get Lost" is a jazz standard with music by Jimmy McHugh and lyrics by Frank Loesser. It first appeared in the 1943 film Happy Go Lucky and several recordings were released in the same year, with three reaching the Billboard charts. A 1955 Chet Baker version helped popularise the song again.

== 1940s ==
The song was first performed by Mary Martin for the 1943 film Happy Go Lucky. The music was published by Famous Music.

A recording by Vaughn Monroe and his orchestra was released by Victor Records early in 1943. A reviewer for The Billboard described the composition as "a light love ballad with an infectious lilt" and wrote: "Capably aided by the Four Lee Sisters, Monroe starts the side singing the verse and chorus. Band ensemble brings up the last half of another chorus, giving way on the last lines to allow Monroe and the harmonizing sister team to take it out." The same issue of the magazine announced that Jimmy Dorsey had recorded another version of the song for Decca Records. This was soon followed by a Teddy Powell rendition for Bluebird Records, featuring vocalist Peggy Mann, which the reviewer described as "an impressive and lovely torch ballad on the blues side". These were followed by Columbia's release of a Kay Kyser version at the end of March 1943, which the reviewer wrote was "Set at a slow and soothing tempo that heightens the mood of the song".

The Billboard Music Year Book listed the Monroe, Dorsey, and Kyser releases among the "most popular juke box records" between September 5, 1942 and September 11, 1943, and the Monroe and Kyser versions among the "best selling records". For the music publishers, the song also appeared in the top ten "songs with most radio plugs" and "national best selling retail records" charts at times in 1943.

== Chet Baker ==
The song is the opening track on a 1955 album by jazz trumpeter Chet Baker, a performance described by an AllMusic reviewer as "the definitive reading of the song". Baker's vocal performances of "Let's Get Lost" helped spread awareness of the composition among other musicians decades later. The song subsequently served as the title for a 1988 documentary about his life. "Let's Get Lost" has been covered by many other musicians.
