= Nancy Schreiber =

American cinematographer (born 1949)

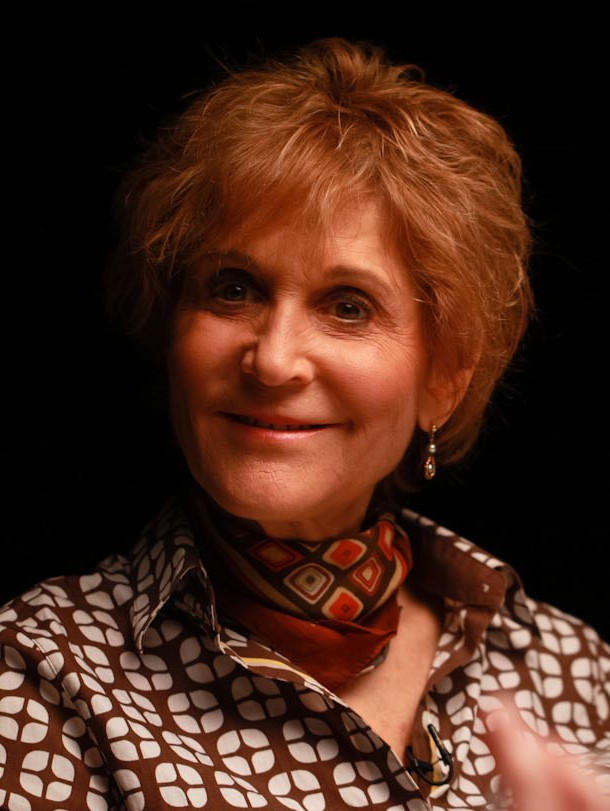
- Schreiber in 2010
- Born: June 27, 1949 (age 77); Detroit, Michigan, U.S.
- Occupation: Cinematographer
- Years active: 1992–present

Nancy Schreiber (born June 27, 1949) is an American cinematographer known for her work on Chain of Desire, Dead Beat, The Celluloid Closet, November, and The Nines.

== Early life and education ==
Nancy Schreiber was born on June 27, 1949, in Detroit, Michigan. Her mother was a docent and art dealer. Although her father died when she was young, he sparked Schreiber's interest in film as he was into photography, mainly using 8mm and 16mm film. In an interview, Schreiber said that Lawrence of Arabia had the biggest influence on her when she was younger. Schreiber completed a dual degree (Psychology and History of art) at University of Michigan. During her time at university, she took some photography classes and ran the film society's theatre in Ann Arbor. After she graduated, she took a two-month film course in New York City, which was what started her film career.

== Career ==
Nancy Schreiber's first job as a production assistant was found by replying to an ad in a newspaper. By the end of the film shoot, she became a part of the electrical crew and was the best boy of the department. After this, she began to work in the electrical department in many commercials and films. Her first job as a Director of Photography was for a low-budget Western film. As well as working on films and TV shows, Schreiber has worked on music videos, including musicians like Aretha Franklin and Van Morrison. Many American and international cinematographers have influenced Schreiber, the main ones including Sven Nykvist, Vittorio Storaro, Eduardo Serra, and Emmanuel Lubezki. During the 1990s, Schreiber was an adjunct professor at the American Film Institute and taught advanced cinematography. Outside of these cinematographers, Rembrandt, Vincent van Gogh, Ingmar Bergman, Sergei Eisenstein, and the French New Wave movement have influenced her. Schreiber became a member of NABET and was the first female gaffer to do so. In 1995, she became an official member of the American Society of Cinematographers and was the fourth woman to join it. Schreiber has been on two film festival juries, the Sundance Dramatic Jury and the AFI Film Festival Jury. Throughout her career, Schreiber has been on the Board of Governors of the American Society of Cinematographers, a board member of the Women in Film Foundation, and a member of the Academy of Motion Picture Arts and Sciences.

== Selected filmography ==
Year	Title	Role
1992	Chain of Desire	Director of Photography
1994	Dead Beat	Director of Photography
1995	Celluloid Closet	Director of Photography
1998	Your Friends & Neighbors	Director of Photography
1998	Thicker Than Blood	Director of Photography
2000	Book of Shadows: Blair Witch 2	Director of Photography
2001	Ghost World	Additional Photographer
2004	November	Director of Photography
2006	Cinematographer Style	Herself
2006	Shut Up & Sing	Additional Cinematographer
2007	The Nines	Director of Photography
2008	A Beautiful Life	Director of Photography
2015	Louis C.K.: Live at the Comedy Store	Camera Operator
2019	Mapplethorpe	Director of Photography

== Awards ==
Year	Group	Category	Film	Result
1994	Independent Spirit Award	Best Cinematography	Chain of Desire	Nominated
1994	Camerimage Golden Frog	Best Cinematography	Dead Beat	Nominated
1996	Emmy Awards	Outstanding Individual Achievement – Informational Programming	Celluloid Closet	Nominated
1997	Women in Film's Kodak Vision Award	For her Narrative Work in Film	N/A	Won
2004	Sundance Film Festival	Excellence in Dramatic Cinematography	November	Won
