= Souled Out (Raelets with Ike & Tina Turner album) =

Compilation album by The Raelets with Ike & Tina Turner
- Released: February 1970
- Genre: Soul
- Label: Tangerine

Ike & Tina Turner chronology
Souled Out (1970)	Yesterday...Today...Tomorrow (1972)

Ike & Tina Turner chronology
Ike & Tina Turner's Festival of Live Performances (1970)	Souled Out (1970)	Come Together (1970)

Singles from Souled Out
- 1. "Dust My Broom" Released: August 1971

Souled Out is a compilation album by the Raelets with Ike & Tina Turner. The album was released on Ray Charles' Tangerine label in 1970. It is the first album by Charles' girl group, the Raelets who were also his backing vocalists.

== Recording and release ==
Souled Out features eight songs by the Raelets who were the background singers for Ray Charles, and four songs from R&B duo Ike & Tina Turner.

Ike & Tina Turner recorded for Tangerine Records in 1966, resulting in the singles "Dust My Broom" and "Anything You Wasn't Born With." After the success of "Proud Mary" by Ike & Tina Turner in 1971, "Dust My Broom" was reissued as a single from the album and reached No. 54 on the Cash Box R&B chart.

== Critical reception ==
The album was selected as a special merit pick from Billboard magazine.

Billboard (February 28, 1970):

Ray Charles' Tangerine label features the Raelets and benefits greatly by the addition of Ike a Tina Turner to the album. The Raelets star on "I Get Along All Right," plus Charles' "A Lover's Blues" and "One Hurt Deserves Another," while the Minit Records duo kick up a storm on "Dust My Broom," "Beauty Is Just Skin Deep" and two others. A quality album for the ABC-distributed label, offering both the soft and funky side of soul.

== Track listing ==
Side A
No.	Title	Length
1.	"I Get Along All Right" (Raelets)	3:00
2.	"All I Need Is Love" (Raelets)	2:35
3.	"Dust My Broom" (Ike & Tina Turner)	2:20
4.	"I'm Hooked" (Ike & Tina Turner)	2:30
5.	"Into Something Fine" (Raelets)	2:21
6.	"A Lover's Blues" (Raelets)	2:36

Side B
No.	Title	Length
1.	"One Hurt Deserves Another" (Raelets)	2:45
2.	"One Room Paradise" (Raelets)	1:48
3.	"I Want To Thank You" (Raelets)	3:10
4.	"It's Almost Here" (Raelets)	2:25
5.	"Anything You Wasn't Born With" (Ike & Tina Turner)	2:45
6.	"Beauty Is Just Skin Deep" (Ike & Tina Turner)	2:42
