= Ray's Moods =

Studio album by Ray Charles
- Released: July 1966
- Genre: R&B; soul
- Length: 32:32
- Label: ABC/Tangerine

Ray Charles chronology
Crying Time (1966)	Ray's Moods (1966)	Ray Charles Invites You to Listen (1967)

Professional ratings
Review scores
Source	Rating
AllMusic	3/5 stars

Ray's Moods is a studio album by Ray Charles released in July 1966.

== Chart performance ==
The album debuted on Billboard magazine's Top LP's chart in the issue dated September 17, 1966, peaking at No. 52 during a seventeen-week run.

== Track listing ==
1. "What-Cha Doing in There (I Wanna Know)" (C. Sessions) – 2:22
2. "Please Say You're Fooling" (Bobby Stevenson) – 2:43
3. "By the Light of the Silvery Moon" (Edward Madden, Gus Edwards) – 2:46
4. "You Don't Understand" (Biba Lee Walker) – 3:05
5. "Maybe It's Because of Love" (Percy Mayfield) – 3:08
6. "Chitlins with Candied Yams" (Ray Charles) – 4:40
7. "Granny Wasn't Grinning That Day" (Percy Mayfield) – 2:08
8. "She's Lonesome Again" (George Riddle) – 2:29
9. "Sentimental Journey" (Ben Homer, Bud Green, Les Brown) – 2:56
10. "A Born Loser" (Don Gibson) – 2:13
11. "It's a Man's World" (Leroy Kirkland, Pearl Woods) – 3:23
12. "A Girl I Used to Know" (Jack Clement) – 2:39

== Charts ==
Chart	Peak position
US Billboard Top LP's	52
US Hot R&B LP's (Billboard)	7

== Personnel ==
- Ray Charles – keyboards, vocals
- Onzy Matthews – arranger
