= Ruth Young (singer) =

American jazz singer

Ruth Young is an American jazz singer, born in New York. She was the common-law wife of jazz trumpeter Chet Baker.

== Early life ==
Young grew up in a show business family in Manhattan and Beverly Hills. Her father was the Vice President of United Artists Company. Her parents were friends with actresses Marilyn Monroe and Jane Russell. They would go to jazz clubs together in Los Angeles. Young became interested in singing at a very young age and was singing to Peggy Lee, Anita O'Day, Julie London, and Frank Sinatra records by the age of 7.

== Career ==
In 1973, Young met Chet Baker while he was headlining at the Half Note Club. Down and out at the time after a long period in obscurity after having his teeth knocked out in a 1966 attack, she recalls that he looked "absolutely horrible", with his gaunt features and burgundy and red outfit and cowboy boots and "sounded like shit", but was charming, still considering him to be a hero. The two began spending time together and began a relationship. Two duets between Baker and Young appeared on his 1977 album The Incredible Chet Baker Plays and Sings, made in Milan.

In 1988, Young gained much attention for her biting comments about Baker in the documentary film Let's Get Lost. She described him as "manipulative" and later said "You gotta realize, Chet was not that intelligent". He did not know what he was doing...He just did it."

== Musical Style ==
Michael P. Gladstone of AllAboutJazz comments that "despite an occasional intonation", Young can "eerily" emulate Baker's phrasing and timing in her singing. She released an album named This Is Always in 2005.
