= Way Down (album) =

Studio album by Curtis Amy featuring Victor Feldman
- Released: 1962
- Recorded: January 29 and February 5, 1962
- Studio: Pacific Jazz Studios, Hollywood, CA
- Label: Pacific Jazz; PJ 46
- Producer: Richard Bock

Curtis Amy chronology
Meetin' Here (1961)	Way Down (1962)	Tippin' on Through (1962)

Way Down is an album by saxophonist Curtis Amy recorded in early 1962 for the Pacific Jazz label.

== Reception ==
Professional ratings
Review scores
Source	Rating
AllMusic	4.5/5 stars

AllMusic reviewer David Szatmary described the album as containing "excellent West Coast bop".

== Track listing ==
All compositions by Curtis Amy, except where indicated

1. "Way Down" (Onzy Matthews) - 7:37
2. "Liberia" - 6:44
3. "24 Hour Blues" - 5:20
4. "Liza" - 2:32
5. "A Soulful Bee, A Soulful Rose" - 6:52
6. "All My Life" (Sam H. Stept, Sidney D. Mitchell) - 7:17
7. "Bells and Horns" (Milt Jackson) - 5:34

== Personnel ==
- Curtis Amy - tenor saxophone
- Marcus Belgrave - trumpet
- Roy Brewster - valve trombone
- Roy Ayers - vibraphone
- John Houston (tracks 3–5), Victor Feldman (tracks 1, 2, 6 & 7) - piano
- George Morrow - bass
- Tony Bazley - drums
