= Chet Baker Sings and Plays =

Studio album by Chet Baker
- Released: 1955
- Recorded: February 28 and March 7, 1955
- Studios: Capitol, 5515 Melrose (Hollywood)
- Genre: Jazz
- Length: 37:53
- Labels: Pacific Jazz; PJ 1202
- Producer: Richard Bock

Chet Baker chronology
Jazz at Ann Arbor (1954)	Chet Baker Sings and Plays (1955)	Chet Baker in Europe (1955)

Chet Baker Sings and Plays (subtitled With Bud Shank, Russ Freeman and Strings) is an album by jazz trumpeter Chet Baker recorded in 1955 for Barclay Records and released on the Pacific Jazz label.

== Reception ==
Professional ratings
Review scores
Source	Rating
Allmusic	4/5 stars
Tom Hull	A−

Matt Collar of Allmusic stated, "With the growing popularity of Chet Baker's first vocal album, Chet Baker Sings, Pacific Jazz producer Richard Bock wanted to capitalize on both facets of his young star's abilities. Hence, the trumpeter turned vocalist entered the studio in 1955 with both his quartet featuring pianist Russ Freeman and an expanded sextet including bassist Red Mitchell, Bud Shank on flute, and various string players. The resulting album, Chet Baker Sings and Plays, helped set in stone the image of Baker as the jazz world's matinee idol and icon of '50s West Coast cool".

== Cover ==
The cover is a mostly black and white collage made of various sources. The photos of Baker were taken by William Claxton. The picture of the Colosseum evokes Europe, where Baker began touring for the first time in September 1955. Images of Cupid, flowers, and a cropped close-up of Baker with his girlfriend Lili Cukier reflect the romantic track listing, containing love and torch songs. The song titles are spelled out in words taken from magazines.

== Track listing ==
1. "Let's Get Lost" (Jimmy McHugh, Frank Loesser) – 3:43
2. "This Is Always" (Harry Warren, Mack Gordon) – 3:06
3. "Long Ago (and Far Away)" (Jerome Kern, Ira Gershwin) – 3:57
4. "Someone to Watch Over Me" (George Gershwin, Ira Gershwin) – 3:01
5. "Just Friends" (John Klenner, Sam M. Lewis) – 2:43
6. "I Wish I Knew" (Harry Warren, Mack Gordon) – 3:59
7. "Daybreak" (Ferde Grofé, Harold Adamson) – 2:41
8. "You Don't Know What Love Is" (Gene de Paul, Don Raye) – 4:50
9. "Grey December" (Frank Campo) – 3:41
10. "I Remember You" (Victor Schertzinger, Johnny Mercer) – 3:15
11. "Let's Get Lost" -EP Version- (Jimmy McHugh, Frank Loesser) – 2:57 Bonus track on CD reissue
- Recorded at Capitol Studios in Hollywood, California on February 28, 1955 (tracks 2, 4, 6 & 9) and in Los Angeles, California on March 7, 1955 (tracks 1, 3, 5, 7, 8, 10 & 11)

== Personnel ==
- Chet Baker – trumpet, vocals
- Bud Shank – flute (tracks 2, 4, 6 & 9)
- Russ Freeman – piano
- Red Mitchell (tracks 2, 4, 6 & 9), Carson Smith (tracks 1, 3, 5, 7, 8, 10 & 11) – bass
- Bob Neel – drums
- Frank Campo, Johnny Mandel, Marty Paich – arrangers (tracks 2, 4, 6 & 9)
- Ray Kramer, Ed Lustgarten, Kurt Reher, Eleanor Slatkin – cello (tracks 2, 4, 6 & 9)
- Corky Hale – harp (tracks 2, 4, 6 & 9)

== Charts ==
Chart performance for Chet Baker Sings and Plays
Chart (2023–2026)	Peak position
US Top Jazz Albums (Billboard)	10
US Top Traditional Jazz Albums (Billboard)	7
