= The Blues Message =

Studio album by Curtis Amy & Paul Bryant
- Released: 1960
- Recorded: August 11 & 17, 1960
- Studio: Rex Productions Studio, Hollywood, CA
- Genre: Jazz
- Label: Pacific Jazz; PJ 9
- Producer: Richard Bock

Curtis Amy chronology
The Blues Message (1960)	Groovin' Blue (1961)

The Blues Message is an album by saxophonist Curtis Amy and organist Paul Bryant recorded in 1960 for the Pacific Jazz label.

== Reception ==
Professional ratings
Review scores
Source	Rating
AllMusic	3/5 stars

AllMusic rated the album with 3 stars.

== Track listing ==
All compositions by Curtis Amy, except as indicated

1. "Searchin'" (Paul Bryant) - 8:44
2. "Goin' Down, Catch Me a Woman" - 9:22
3. "The Blues Message" - 8:44
4. "Come Rain or Come Shine" (Harold Arlen, Johnny Mercer) - 4:54
5. "This Is the Blues" - 8:38

== Personnel ==
- Curtis Amy - tenor saxophone
- Paul Bryant - organ
- Roy Brewster - valve trombone
- Clarence Jones - bass
- Jimmy Miller - drums
