= Tangerine Records (1962) =

American record label founded by Ray Charles

- Parent company: ABC-Paramount Records
- Founded: 1962
- Founder: Ray Charles
- Defunct: 1973
- Distributor: ABC-Paramount Records
- Genre: R&B, soul music, jazz music

Tangerine Records was an American record label founded by musician Ray Charles in 1962. Charles switched to the label in 1966. Tangerine was promoted and distributed by ABC-Paramount Records. Early singles labels were orange and later became black, red and white. After Charles left ABC in 1973, he closed Tangerine and started Crossover Records. Ray Charles Enterprises owns the catalog.

== Notable releases ==
=== Albums ===
- 1966: Crying Time – Ray Charles
- 1967: Ray's Moods – Ray Charles
- 1967: Ray Charles Invites You to Listen – Ray Charles
- 1968: A Portrait of Ray – Ray Charles
- 1969: Vibrations – Rita Graham (a Raelette at the time)
- 1970: Souled Out – The Raeletts with Ike & Tina Turner
- 1971: Volcanic Action of My Soul – Ray Charles

=== Hit singles ===
- 1963: "River's Invitation" (#99 Pop / #25 R&B) – Percy Mayfield
- 1966: "I Don't Need No Doctor" (#75 Pop / #45 R&B) – Ray Charles
- 1967: "One Hurt Deserves Another" (#76 Pop / #24 R&B) – The Raelettes
- 1967: "Here We Go Again" (#15 Pop / #5 R&B) – Ray Charles
- 1968: "Eleanor Rigby" (#35 Pop / #30 R&B) – Ray Charles
- 1968: "I'm Gett'n Long Alright" (#23 R&B) – The Raelettes
- 1968: "I Want To Thank You" (#47 R&B) – The Raelettes
- 1970: "I Want To (Do Everything for You)" (#96 Pop / #39 R&B) – The Raelettes
- 1970: "Bad Water" (#58 Pop / #40 R&B) – The Raelettes
- 1971: "Dust My Broom" (#54 Cash Box R&B) – Ike & Tina Turner
- 1971: "Don't Change on Me" (#36 Pop / #13 R&B) – Ray Charles
- 1972: "Booty Butt" (#31 Pop / #13 R&B) – Ray Charles

== Roster ==
Acts signed to Tangerine included:

- Ray Charles
- The Raelettes
- Ike & Tina Turner
- Jimmy Scott
- Al Grey
- Emile Griffith
- Percy Mayfield
- Louis Jordan
- The Ohio Players
- Lula Reed
- David Thorne

== Bibliography ==
- Charles, Ray; Ritz, David (2004). Brother Ray: Ray Charles' Own Story (Third Da Capo Press ed.). Da Capo Press. ISBN 0-306-81431-5.
- Lydon, Michael (1998). Ray Charles: Man and Music. Riverhead Books. ISBN 1-57322-132-5.
