= Meetin' Here =

Studio album by Curtis Amy & Paul Bryant
- Released: 1961
- Recorded: February 1, 1961
- Studio: Pacific Jazz Studios, Hollywood, CA
- Genre: Jazz
- Label: Pacific Jazz; PJ 26
- Producer: Richard Bock

Curtis Amy chronology
Groovin' Blue (1961)	Meetin' Here (1961)	Way Down (1962)

Meetin' Here is an album by saxophonist Curtis Amy and organist Paul Bryant recorded in 1960 for the Pacific Jazz label.

== Reception ==
Professional ratings
Review scores
Source	Rating
AllMusic	3/5 stars
DownBeat	3.5/5 stars

The contemporaneous DownBeat reviewer stated: "The overall unit feel is excellent – this group settles into a tune and cooks. The solos flow easily and without hesitation out of the ensemble and back in again. But the rating is held down partly by Jones and Miller, who are not consistently effective". AllMusic rated the album with 3 stars.

== Track listing ==
All compositions by Curtis Amy except as indicated

1. "Meetin' Here" (Onzy Matthews) - 7:04
2. "Early in the Morning" - 6:46
3. "If I Were a Bell" (Frank Loesser) - 6:02
4. "One More Hamhock Please" - 7:59
5. "Angel Eyes" (Matt Dennis, Earl Brent) - 6:18
6. "Just Friends" (John Klenner, Sam M. Lewis) - 4:10

== Personnel ==
- Curtis Amy - tenor saxophone
- Paul Bryant - organ
- Roy Brewster - valve trombone
- Clarence Jones - bass
- Jimmy Miller - drums
