= Groovin' Blue (Curtis Amy & Frank Butler album) =

Studio album by Curtis Amy & Frank Butler
- Released: 1961
- Recorded: December 10, 1960 and January 10, 1961
- Studio: Pacific Jazz Studios, Hollywood, CA
- Genre: Jazz
- Label: Pacific Jazz; PJ 19
- Producer: Richard Bock

Curtis Amy chronology
The Blues Message (1960)	Groovin' Blue (1961)	Meetin' Here (1961)

Groovin' Blue is an album by saxophonist Curtis Amy and drummer Frank Butler recorded in late 1960 and early 1961 for the Pacific Jazz label.

== Reception ==
Professional ratings
Review scores
Source	Rating
AllMusic	3/5 stars

In a review for AllMusic, critic David Szatmary states: "Another solid example of this neglected tenor man".

== Track listing ==
All compositions by Curtis Amy

1. "Gone Into It" - 6:15
2. "Annsome" - 8:35
3. "Bobblin'" - 5:20
4. "Groovin' Blue" - 8:15
5. "Beautiful You" - 7:36
6. "Very Frank" - 1:48

== Personnel ==
- Curtis Amy - tenor saxophone
- Frank Butler - drums
- Carmell Jones - trumpet
- Bobby Hutcherson - vibraphone
- Frank Strazzeri - piano
- Jimmy Bond - bass
