= Katanga! =

Studio album by Curtis Amy & Dupree Bolton
- Released: 1963
- Recorded: February 3, 1963
- Studio: Pacific Jazz Studios, Hollywood, CA
- Genre: Jazz
- Label: Pacific Jazz; PJ 70
- Producer: Richard Bock

Curtis Amy chronology
Tippin' on Through (1962)	Katanga! (1963)	The Sounds of Broadway / The Sounds of Hollywood (1965)

Katanga! is an album by saxophonist Curtis Amy recorded in early 1963 for the Pacific Jazz label.

== Reception ==
Professional ratings
Review scores
Source	Rating
AllMusic	4/5 stars

AllMusic reviewer Scott Yanow observed: "Amy had a fine hard bop-oriented style with a soulful sound. […] Obscure but rewarding music that was overshadowed during the era and was previously long out of print."

== Track listing ==
All compositions by Curtis Amy, except as indicated

1. "Katanga" (Dupree Bolton) - 3:02
2. "Lonely Woman" - 3:47
3. "Native Land" - 10:18
4. "Amyable" (Jack Wilson) - 6:11
5. "You Don't Know What Love Is" (Don Raye, Gene de Paul) - 5:57
6. "A Shade of Brown" (Clifford Solomon) - 5:57

== Personnel ==
- Curtis Amy - tenor saxophone, soprano saxophone
- Dupree Bolton - trumpet
- Jack Wilson - piano
- Ray Crawford - guitar
- Victor Gaskin - bass
- Doug Sides - drums
