= Chet Is Back! =

Studio album by Chet Baker
- Released: 1962
- Recorded: January 5–15, 1962, RCA Italiana Studios, Rome, Italy.
- Genre: Jazz
- Label: RCA
- Producer: Daniel Baumgarten; Joshua Sherman

Chet Baker chronology
Chet Baker with Fifty Italian Strings (1959)	Chet Is Back! (1962)	Italian Movies: Music of Piero Ulimiani (1962)

Professional ratings
Review scores
Source	Rating
The Penguin Guide to Jazz Recordings	3/4 stars
Tom Hull	B

Chet Is Back! is a 1962 studio album by jazz musician Chet Baker.

== Background ==
Chet Is Back! was recorded in Rome, Italy in 1962 at RCA's Studios. It features bop-oriented tunes such as "Pent-Up House" and "Well, You Needn't". His Chet Baker Sextet consisted of a group of up-and-coming European jazz musicians, which included Belgian saxophonist Bobby Jaspar, Belgian guitarist Rene Thomas, Italian pianist Amedeo Tommasi, Belgian bassist Benoit Quersin, and Swiss drummer Daniel Humair.

The album features an original composition, "Ballata in forma di blues" ("A Ballad in Blues Style"), by Amedeo Tommasi. Ballads are featured, including "Over the Rainbow", "Star Eyes", and "These Foolish Things". Compositions by other jazz musicians are also featured, such as Thelonious Monk's "Well, You Needn't", Sonny Rollins' "Pent Up House", Charlie Parker's "Barbados", and Oscar Pettiford's "Blues in the Closet".

== Reissue ==
On the 2003 CD reissue of Chet Is Back!, four orchestral pop bonus tracks Baker recorded with Ennio Morricone in Rome in 1962 are featured, "Chetty's Lullaby", "So che ti perderò", "Motivo su raggio di luna", and "Il mio domani", which Baker co-wrote with lyricist Alessandro Maffei. Morricone arranged the songs and conducted the orchestra. Baker plays trumpet and sings lead vocals on these four tracks, originally released as 45 singles by RCA Victor in 1962 in Italy.

== Somewhere Over The Rainbow release ==
1992 6 track release as the 'Somewhere Over The Rainbow' album containing tracks 1,2,4,5,6 and 8 from the original release.

== Track listing ==
1. "Well, You Needn't" (Thelonious Monk) - 6:23
2. "These Foolish Things (Remind Me of You)" (Harry Link, Holt Marvell, Jack Strachey) - 4:56
3. "Barbados" (Charlie Parker) - 8:26
4. "Star Eyes" (Gene de Paul, Don Raye) - 6:58
5. "Over the Rainbow" (Harold Arlen, E.Y. "Yip" Harburg) - 3:30
6. "Pent-Up House" (Sonny Rollins) - 6:51
7. "Ballata in forma di blues" (Amedeo Tommasi) - 10:06
8. "Blues In the Closet" (Oscar Pettiford) - 7:41

Bonus Tracks on some CD reissues

9. "Chetty's Lullaby" (Chet Baker, Alessandro Maffei) - 4:04
10. "So che ti perderò" (Baker, Maffei) - 4:16
11. "Motivo su raggio di luna" (Baker, Maffei) - 3:53
12. "Il mio domani" (Baker, Maffei) - 5:21

== Personnel ==
Tracks 1–8

- Chet Baker – trumpet
- Bobby Jaspar – tenor saxophone, flute (except 2 & 5)
- Rene Thomas – guitar (except 5)
- Amedeo Tommasi – piano (except 2)
- Benoit Quersin – bass
- Daniel Humair – drums

Tracks 9–12

- Chet Baker – vocals, trumpet
- Ennio Morricone – Conductor
- Ennio Morricone and his Orchestra – strings, horns, percussion

Production notes:

- Daniel Baumgarten – producer (Tracks 1–8)
- Joshua Sherman – producer (Tracks 9–12)
- Jean-Pierre Chalbos – engineer (Tracks 1–8)
- Michael O. Drexler – engineer (Tracks 9–12)
