= Mickey Cottrell =

American film publicist and actor (1944–2024)

- Born: Richard Edward Cottrell; September 4, 1944; Springfield, Illinois, U.S.
- Died: January 1, 2024 (aged 79); Los Angeles, California, U.S.
- Education: University of Arkansas
- Occupations: Publicist; film producer; actor

Richard Edward Cottrell (September 4, 1944 – January 1, 2024), professionally known as Mickey Cottrell, was an American Hollywood film publicist, independent film producer and occasional actor, known for his work on My Own Private Idaho, Volcano, and Ed Wood. Cottrell had small roles in the television series Star Trek: The Next Generation and Star Trek: Voyager.

== Early life and education ==
Cottrell was born on September 4, 1944, in Springfield, Illinois.

He attended the University of Arkansas.

== Career ==
He worked at the Guthrie Theatre and then the Loyola Theatre as a film projectionist. He worked subsequently as a publicist starting at Landmark Theatres (1982 and 1984), then John Baron Associates, before establishing Cottrell and Lindeman Associates with his business partner in 1989, before going freelance and founding in 2002 Mickey Cottrell Film Publicity.

Cottrell worked as a film producer on Chain of Desire and Shelf Life.

== Death ==
In 2016, he suffered a significant stroke. He resided at the Film and Television Country House and Hospital in Woodland Hills, Los Angeles, where he died from Parkinson's disease on January 1, 2024, aged 79.
