= Chetty's Lullaby =

1962 jazz song composed by Chet Baker

1962 45 single release in Italy by RCA Victor

"Chetty's Lullaby" is a 1962 jazz song composed by Chet Baker. The song was released as a single in 1962 in Italy.

== Background ==
"Chetty's Lullaby" was released as a 45 single by RCA Records in June 1962 as PM 45–3068 in mono backed with "So che ti perderò". The track was recorded during the Chet Is Back! sessions for RCA in Rome at RCA's studios in the spring of 1962. Ennio Morricone was the conductor and arranger. The choir on the session is The Swingers. The track was released as a bonus track on the Chet is Back! CD release by RCA in 2003 in the U.S. Chet Baker plays the trumpet and also sings on the track. The song was only released in Italy as a vinyl 7" 45 picture sleeve single. The lyrics are in Italian. Chet Baker composed the music. Alessandro Maffei wrote the lyrics. Maffei also wrote the lyrics to "So che ti perdero". The song was written for Chet Baker's son.

The recording was also featured on the 1999 compilation box set The Ennio Morricone Chronicles on BMG International.

"Chetty's Lullaby" appeared on the soundtrack of the 1988 Academy Award-nominated documentary film Let's Get Lost.

In August 1960, Chet Baker was arrested in Lucca, Italy. He was convicted of drug smuggling and forgery and sentenced to a year, seven months, and ten days in a Lucca prison. When he was released early, in December 1961, RCA Italiana organized collaborative sessions with composer, arranger, and conductor Ennio Morricone. In 1962, they recorded four of Chet Baker's own compositions that he wrote while incarcerated: "Chetty's Lullaby", "So che ti perderò", "Il mio domani", and "Motivo su raggio di luna".

A 2012 play by Stephan Delbos used the title of the song in dramatizing the period when the song was recorded during Chet Baker's stay in Italy in the early 1960s.

The recording appeared on the Sony Music greatest hits compilation Chet Baker – My Funny Valentine. The Best Of Chet Baker, Chet Baker Sings - The Complete 1953-62 Vocal Studio Recordings on Valentine Records in 2014, the Sony Music compilation The Perfect Jazz Collection in 2010, the RCA Victor album Disco Refrain N.2 released in Italy, and New Morning: A Dream Mix by Yvinek on BMG France in 2004.

== Other recordings ==
Sue Richardson recorded the song on the 2013 Chet Baker tribute album Too Cool: The Life and Music of Chet Baker on Splash Point. Philip Watt, who plays Chet Baker in the eponymous play, has also recorded the song. The song was performed and recorded in March 2008 at the Peninsula Regent in San Mateo California by Marianne Messina, on piano, Peter Skilj, on drums and Jack Wada, on trumpet and vocal. The Hajdu Klara Quartet recorded the song for the tribute album Plays Standards: Dedicated to Chet Baker in 2015.

== Sources ==
- Baker, Chet. As Though I Had Wings: The Lost Memoir. St. Martin's Press, 1997.
- De Valk, Jeroen. Chet Baker: His Life and Music. Berkeley Hills Books, 2000.
- Gavin, James. Deep in a Dream: The Long Night of Chet Baker. 2011.
- Rouy, Gérard. Chet Baker. Paris: Editions du limon, 1992.
- Ruddick, Matthew. Funny Valentine: The Story of Chet Baker. Melrose Books, 2012.
