= Motivo su raggio di luna =

Single by Chet Baker
- English title: "Contemplate on a moonbeam"
- B-side: "Il mio domani"
- Released: 1962
- Studio: RCA Studios Rome
- Genre: Jazz
- Length: 3:52
- Label: RCA Victor
- Composer: Chet Baker
- Lyricist: Alessandro Maffei

"Motivo su raggio di luna" is a 1962 jazz song composed by Chet Baker. The song was released as a single in 1962 in Italy.

== Development ==
"Motivo su raggio di luna" or "Contemplate on a moonbeam" was released in Italy as a vinyl 7" 45 picture sleeve single by RCA Records in June, 1962 as 45–3080 in mono backed with "Il mio domani". The track was recorded during the Chet Is Back! sessions for RCA in Rome at RCA's studios in the spring of 1962. Ennio Morricone conducted and arranged and the choir, backing Baker on trumpet and vocals, was The Swingers. The lyrics are in Italian, written by Alessandro Maffei, while Baker composed the music. Maffei also wrote the lyrics to "So che ti perderò", "Il mio domani", and "Chetty's Lullaby".

== Background ==
In August, 1960, Baker was arrested in Lucca, Italy. He was convicted of drug smuggling and forgery and sentenced to a year, seven months, and ten days in a Lucca prison. When he was released early, in December 1961, RCA Italiana organized collaborative sessions with composer, arranger, and conductor Ennio Morricone. In 1962, they recorded four of Baker's own compositions that he wrote while incarcerated: "Chetty's Lullaby", "So che ti perderò", "Il mio domani", and "Motivo su raggio di luna".

The recording was featured on the 1999 compilation box set The Ennio Morricone Chronicles on BMG International, on the Chet is Back! CD release by RCA in 2003 in the U.S. as a bonus track, on the 2010 Sony album The Perfect Jazz Collection, and on the 2014 collection Chet Baker Sings - The Complete 1953-62 Vocal Studio Recordings on Valentine Records.

== Other recordings ==
Sue Richardson recorded the song on the 2013 Chet Baker tribute album, Too Cool: The Life and Music of Chet Baker, on Splash Point.

== Sources ==
- Baker, Chet. As Though I Had Wings: The Lost Memoir. St. Martin's Press, 1997.
- De Valk, Jeroen. Chet Baker: His Life and Music. Berkeley Hills Books, 2000.
- Gavin, James. Deep in a Dream: The Long Night of Chet Baker. 2011.
- Rouy, Gérard. Chet Baker. Paris: Editions du limon, 1992.
- Ruddick, Matthew. Funny Valentine: The Story of Chet Baker. Melrose Books, 2012.
