= Onzy Matthews =

American jazz musician, composer & actor (1930–1997)

- Onzy Matthews, 1976

Background information
- Born: Onzy Durrett Matthews, Jr. January 15, 1930; Fort Worth, Texas, US
- Died: November 13, 1997 (aged 67) Dallas, Texas
- Genres: Jazz, bebop, soul, R&B, hard bop, jazz fusion
- Occupations: Musician, composer, arranger, actor
- Instruments: Piano, singer
- Labels: Capitol; ABC-Paramount; Elektra; Atlantic
- Formerly of: Lou Rawls; Ray Charles; Esther Phillips; Duke Ellington; Mercer Ellington

Onzy Durrett Matthews, Jr. (January 15, 1930 – November 13, 1997) was an American jazz pianist, singer, arranger, composer, and television and movie actor. He is best known for the big band arrangements done for the Lou Rawls albums Black and Blue and Tobacco Road, as well as arrangements for several of Ray Charles' 1960s releases. He had his own big band for many years and recorded numerous tracks for Capitol Records, including two albums released under his own name. He later had a close relationship with the Duke Ellington orchestra, working as a pianist, arranger and conductor through the late 1960s and 1970s.

== Biography ==
=== Early days and move to Los Angeles ===
Onzy Durrett Matthews, Jr. was born on January 15, 1930, to Onzy Matthews and Leola Jones in Fort Worth, Texas. He grew up in Dallas until his early teens when his mother moved to Los Angeles seeking better-paying work. His early exposure to music was through singing in a church gospel choir.

Matthews knew early on that he wanted to be a musician: "music was his calling." He graduated from high school early, at the age of 16, and primarily wanted to be a singer. "I taught myself to accompany myself on piano and then I found out you had to have arrangements." In the early 1950s, he enrolled in the Westlake College of Music in Hollywood and studied voice, ear training and harmony; much like Berklee School of Music they were proponents of the Schillinger System. He auditioned for band leader Les Brown as an arranger; Brown helped Matthews focus on what to keep in an arrangement that works, and what to discard.

=== First breaks with Dexter Gordon and Curtis Amy ===
In 1959, Matthews contacted Dexter Gordon who was active in the Los Angeles jazz scene at the time. Matthews' first big band was started with the help of Gordon and fellow saxophonist Curtis Amy. The group started with a book of 21 charts from Matthews, and rehearsed on Wednesday nights for 5 months until they finally booked gigs in the area. The group was a conglomerate of all-star Los Angeles jazz/studio artists who immediately took a liking to playing Matthews' inventive, blues-based orchestrations; the first players coming through his band included Gordon, Amy, Sonny Criss, Jack Sheldon, Carmell Jones, and Red Mitchell. Curtis Amy included two of Matthews' original tunes on his Pacific Jazz albums Meetin' Here and Way Down in 1961 and 1962 respectively. Dexter Gordon recorded Matthews' original tune "Very Saxily Yours" for his Gettin' Around album on Blue Note, but the track was not released until 25 years later on the CD re-issue. Matthews became known around Los Angeles as an adept arranger and musical director; his first professional arranging assignments came at this time with Lionel Hampton, Della Reese, Ruth Price, and Gene McDaniels. The first tune of Matthews to be commercially recorded was in 1956, when clarinetist Maurice Meunier, who had played with Lionel Hampton, recorded in France. Meunier had got a copy of Matthews' "Blues for the Reverend" through his association with the Hampton band the year before.

=== Racial discrimination and problems with recording companies ===
Much like other black jazz artists of that time, it was particularly difficult for Matthews to break prejudice and color barriers. He said at the time: "They said the band was too mixed, a couple of whites or a couple of Negroes would be O.K. but not 50/50." He was confronted by an agent who hired an all-white group for a Las Vegas show rather than Matthews' mixed band. His frustration extended to A&R representatives for Decca, Columbia, and Capitol, who liked the sound of the band and his music but expressed concern after seeing the racially mixed band in person.

=== Onzy Matthews Big Band ===
Matthews' group in the early 1960s was finding work as a big band in Los Angeles; most of his players were shared, alternating with Gerald Wilson's big band (another integrated big band) every other weekend at the Metro Theatre in Los Angeles. The group also had a long running gig on Monday nights at the Virginia Club in Los Angeles.

Players for Matthews' big bands and recordings in Los Angeles included Bud Brisbois, Curtis Amy, Bobby Bryant, Dick Hyde, Teddy Edwards, Earl Palmer, Jay Migliori, Conte Candoli, Richard 'Groove' Holmes, Horace Tapscott, Gabe Baltazar, Joe Maini, Ollie Mitchell, Herb Ellis, Carmell Jones, Sonny Criss, and Jack Nimitz. These included both black and white studio musicians, which continued to present a problem until Matthews worked with the much younger producer Nick Venet after he signed to Capitol. Singers that Matthews featured and wrote for, on their regular live gigs, included Ruth Price, Jimmy Witherspoon, Big Miller, and June Eckstine.

=== Breakthrough with Lou Rawls and Capitol Records ===
Lou Rawls and Onzy Matthews in the early 1960s

Lou Rawls was signed to Capitol Records in early 1961 and had a breakthrough set of hits with Les McCann and the album Stormy Monday. Nick Venet was in charge of Rawls, and introduced him to Matthews. In August 1962, they recorded 13 new charts arranged by Matthews that featured Rawls' resonating baritone voice. Eleven of those charts would comprise Rawls' LP Black and Blue, which charted for three weeks in Billboard magazine from April 1963, reaching no.130. Both men were back in the studio at Capitol in July and August 1963 to record more tracks, which made up Rawls' album Tobacco Road. Both albums were re-issued in 1969 on a Capitol release, Close-Up, which charted for three weeks in Billboard starting in August 1969, peaking at no.191. The band for the two Rawls LPs is essentially the personnel of the Onzy Matthews big band from that time. Matthews' arranging style was a perfect fit for Rawls, but the pair did not re-unite for any other releases for Capitol. Two other sets of singles sessions with Rawls from 1963 have never been issued. Matthews' band continued to back Lou Rawls on live concerts and events during the late 1960s.

A second high-profile Matthews arranging assignment during this time was for Jac Holzman, who used him to arrange the traditional jazz ensemble tracks for Judy Henske's 1963 debut album for Elektra Records.

Matthews was finally signed to Capitol by Venet, and his first LP Non-Stop Jazz Samba was recorded in February 1963. However, the album was not released. It has three different instrumentations of ensembles, with his big band as the core. Matthews showed his adeptness at a wide range of writing; the tracks are somewhat like Quincy Jones' 1962 album Big Band Bossa Nova released by Mercury Records. There are other unissued jazz sessions that Matthews arranged from this time with Dupree Bolton for Pacific Jazz, and tracks with Richard 'Groove' Holmes recorded at Capitol. Later, Holmes had Matthews arrange all the tracks for his own release Book of Blues: Volume I in 1964 for Warner Bros. Records, backed by Matthews' big band. Matthews wrote more charts and supplied the same band on Holmes' November 1966 release A Bowl of Soul, also with Warner Bros. Records.

In January 1964, Matthews recorded his first commercially released LP under his own name for Capitol: Blues with a Touch of Elegance. Though not a financial success, the LP is widely known by musicians and music critics as a masterpiece of jazz composing and arranging. The initial Billboard review was extremely positive putting it in the "Jazz: Special Merit" category. Lefty Louie/Blues Non-Stop, a quartet backed by voices, was also recorded during these sessions and was released as a single on the Capitol label.

Onzy Matthews, 1966 Sounds of the '60s!

July 1964 saw the next Matthews' Capitol album recorded, Sounds of the '60s, but it was not issued until spring 1966. The album is not as cohesive a project as the first release and did not achieve the same fame as Blues With a Touch of Elegance.

In October 1966, Matthews was assigned to write for Esther Phillips. His charts were recorded live in 1970, and appeared on the Atlantic release Confessin' the Blues, one of Phillips' best recordings. The Phillips release has frequently been miscredited as having been recorded in 1976, due to its repackaging as a compilation; again Matthews' big band backs the primary artist. His other arranging assignments for recordings included work for Herb Alpert and Curtis Amy's 1965 LP The Sounds of Broadway/The Sounds of Hollywood for Palomar Records. He did some writing for Lloyd Price's big band and also the Jazz with Steve KTLA T.V. show from Los Angeles in 1963. From then on there were no more releases by Matthews as leader for Capitol or any other recording label; much was recorded with Capitol and finally released for the first time on the Mosaic Select 29 CD set in 2007.

Matthews was known as a singer, but the only documentation of this is on the 2007 Mosaic set. Producer Michael Cuscuna found three tracks Matthews recorded during this era in July and October 1964, where he overdubbed his singing while fronting his big band. These had never been issued before the Mosaic set was issued. The Onzy Matthews big band was recorded far more on other artists' releases, primarily backing singers, than under his own name.

=== Ray Charles and other writing ===
During the mid-1960s, Matthews was able to parlay his earlier arranging success into being offered numerous arranging assignments with singer Ray Charles. All these tracks were recorded for ABC-Paramount. In March and June 1965, two arrangements by Matthews were recorded for Charles' album Country & Western meets Rhythm & Blues. He had one arrangement on the 1966 album Ray's Moods, and three more on Charles' Cryin' Time. Both these 1966 albums charted with Billboard. One last chart completed for Ray Charles was done for the single "That's All I Am To You". Matthews arrangement of Driftin' Blues on Cryin' Time is noted as a standout that features a guitar solo by Ray Crawford. More writing assignments during this time include arranging for television shows such as the June 29, 1965 CBS special, It's What's Happening, Baby! featuring numerous contemporary pop acts.

=== Acting career ===
Matthews first worked in Los Angeles night clubs as a singer in the 1950s, and became known as a personality. He had his first television appearance on the KLAC-TV show Hollywood On Television hosted by Al Jarvis, where he sang in duet with co-host Betty White (her first T.V. work). He also broke into acting around Hollywood; Matthews was tall, handsome, and very well spoken. He appeared in the July 1965 NBC Kraft Suspense Theatre episode Connery's Hand and also the February 14, 1966, episode In Search of April from Run for Your Life starring Ben Gazzara which also ran on NBC.

=== Duke Ellington, Paris, last move to Dallas ===
Matthews and his band went on a three-week tour in 1966 for Capitol Records to promote his second album for the label (Sounds of the '60s!). During a stop in New York City, he met Mercer Ellington and as a result became a piano substitute for Duke Ellington. He undertook several collaborations with the Duke Ellington Orchestra through the 1970s as an arranger. He co-wrote an unrecorded composition with Ellington, Just a Gentle Word from You Will Do. Several years after Duke Ellington died, Matthews had a disagreement in 1979 with Mercer Ellington, and later had to settle a pay dispute with Ellington's son arising from Matthews' uncredited arrangements on the 1996 Musicmasters Records CD release Only God Can Make A Tree.

During the 1970s, Matthews arranged music for albums by Earl Hines and Roy Ayers; he also worked on television music for Paul Anka. At that time, he moved around between New York, Dallas and Seattle, and at one point worked for Sheraton Resorts in the Virgin Islands, Aruba, and Curaçao as solo pianist and singer. Disenchanted by much of the musical scene, in 1979 Matthews moved to Paris and started another jazz orchestra. Working from there as a composer, arranger, and actor, he appeared in the movie Dingo (1991) playing the trumpeter Caesar alongside Miles Davis.

Matthews returned to New York in 1993 after a financially devastating operation for prostate cancer. Mercer Ellington offered Matthews work on his father's Sacred Concert music as an arranger. Matthews also contributed string arrangements for Vanessa Rubin's I'm Glad There Is You album done for RCA Novus during this time. Prompted by his mother's death, in 1994 he moved back to Dallas to be with his father; his father died on May 26, 1995.

Onzy Matthews had a last set of tours and concerts in Europe and Dallas, conducting his own music and that of Duke Ellington in 1996–1997; an interview by the Dallas Observer three months before his death outlined his musical career. Matthews died at the age of 67 on November 13, 1997, in his Dallas apartment, of heart failure brought on by arteriosclerosis.

== Musical legacy ==
In 2007 Michael Cuscuna produced a set of recordings for Mosaic documenting the music from Onzy Matthews' Capitol recordings. This set comprises the two albums he released with his big band plus all the other unissued material recorded at Capitol by Matthews with his band. The first LP, the bossa nova project from 1963, was not put on the market at the time, despite its writing and playing being equal to anything happening during that time in jazz and pop music. Matthews' big bands recorded much more on other artists' LPs than under his own name. He was in demand as an arranger for numerous singers, and the band had a level of success that translated into being a very good live "club date" band and "studio" orchestra. His music and his band never got a real opportunity to stand on its own.

He was an important part of several different musical and cultural movements on the West Coast during the 1950s and 1960s. Matthews was part of the Central Avenue music scene in the 1950s and grew musically from interaction with important jazz musicians such as Lionel Hampton, Dexter Gordon, and Curtis Amy. He also trained at the Westlake College of Music with great composers and arrangers such as Bill Holman, Gary Peacock, Bob Cooper, and Bob Graettinger. Matthews is enigmatic and a hard person to pinpoint; in many ways he did not get nearly the credit he deserved in comparison with big band leaders or musical directors such as Oliver Nelson, Gerald Wilson, or Harold Wheeler.

== Discography, television, film ==
=== As leader ===
- [1963] Non-stop Jazz Samba (Capitol)
- 1964 Blues With A Touch Of Elegance (Capitol)
- 1964 Lefty Louie/Blues Non-Stop (7", Single) (Capitol)
- 1966 Sounds For The '60s! (Capitol)
- 2007 Onzy Matthews: Mosaic Select 29 (Mosaic)

=== As composer, arranger, and/or conductor ===
- 1956 Maurice Meunier & His Orchestra Maurice Meunier (Barclay, FRANCE)
- 1960 Memorial Album, Kenny Dorham (Xanadu)
- 1961 Meetin' Here, Curtis Amy (Pacific Jazz)
- 1962 Break Through, Gene Shaw (Argo)
- 1962 Way Down, Curtis Amy (Pacific Jazz)
- 1962 Black and Blue, Lou Rawls (Capitol)
- 1963 Tobacco Road, Lou Rawls (Capitol)
- 1963 Judy Henske, Judy Henske (Elektra)
- 1964 Book of the Blues, Vol. 1, Richard "Groove" Holmes (Pacific Jazz)
- 1964 Balanced for Broadcast: June 1964, Various artists (Capitol - promotional)
- 1965 Gettin' Around, Dexter Gordon (Blue Note)
- 1965 Country & Western meets Rhythm & Blues, Ray Charles (ABC-Paramount)
- 1965 The Sounds of Broadway/The Sounds of Hollywood, Curtis Amy (Palomar Records)
- 1966 Ray's Moods, Ray Charles (ABC-Paramount)
- 1966 Cryin' Time, Ray Charles (ABC-Paramount)
- 1966 A Bowl Of Soul, Richard "Groove" Holmes (Pacific Jazz)
- 1970/1976 Confessin' the Blues, Esther Phillips (Atlantic)
- 1975 Mystic Voyage, Roy Ayers (Polydor)
- 1977 Jazz Is His Old Lady and My Old Man, Earl Hines (Catalyst Records)
- 1989 Music Is My Mistress Duke Ellington (Musicmasters)
- 1980 Landslide, Dexter Gordon (Blue Note)
- 1994 I'm Glad There Is You: A Tribute to Carmen McRae, Vanessa Rubin (RCA-Novus)
- 1996 Only God Can Make A Tree, Mercer Ellington (Musicmasters)

=== Television and film (actor) ===
- 1965 Kraft Suspense Theatre: Connery's Hands
- 1966 Run for Your Life: In Search of April
- 1991 Dingo

== See also ==
- Lou Rawls
- Ray Charles
- Esther Phillips
- Capitol Records

== Bibliography ==
- Cuscuna, Michael. Mosaic Select 29: Onzy Matthews 3 CDs and extensive liner notes. Mosaic Records, Stamford CT. 2007. OCLC 166272818
- Garneau, Theo. If It Swings, It's Music: the Autobiography of Hawaii's Gabe Baltazar Jr. University of Hawaii Press. 2012. OCLC 767806923
