= Tippin' on Through =

Live album by Curtis Amy
- Released: 1962
- Recorded: July 29, 1962
- Venues: The Lighthouse, Hermosa Beach, CA
- Genre: Jazz
- Labels: Pacific Jazz; PJ 62
- Producer: Richard Bock

Curtis Amy chronology
Way Down (1962)	Tippin' on Through (1962)	Katanga! (1963)

Tippin' on Through is a live album by saxophonist Curtis Amy recorded in 1962 for the Pacific Jazz label.

== Reception ==
Professional ratings
Review scores
Source	Rating
AllMusic	3/5 stars

AllMusic rated the album with 3 stars.

== Track listing ==
All compositions by Curtis Amy except as indicated

1. "Tippin' on Through" (Benny Golson) - 8:43
2. "Funk in the Evening" - 9:38
3. "For Ayers Only" - 6:51
4. "In Your Own Sweet Way" (Dave Brubeck) - 6:34
5. "Summertime" (George Gershwin, DuBose Heyward) - 6:56
6. "Set Call" - 0:25

== Personnel ==
- Curtis Amy - tenor saxophone
- Roy Brewster - valve trombone
- Roy Ayers - vibraphone
- John Houston - piano
- Bob Whitlock - bass
- Lawrence Marable - drums
