= Let's Get Lost (1988 film) =

1988 documentary film by Bruce Weber

- Theatrical poster
- Directed by: Bruce Weber
- Written by: Bruce Weber
- Produced by: Bruce Weber
- Starring: Chet Baker; William Claxton; Russ Freeman; Carol Baker; Vera Baker; Lisa Marie (Actress); Diane Vavra; Ruth Young
- Cinematography: Jeff Preiss
- Edited by: Angelo Corrao
- Music by: Chet Baker
- Production company: Little Bear
- Distributed by: Zeitgeist Films
- Release date: September 15, 1988 (Toronto International Film Festival)
- Running time: 120 minutes
- Country: United States
- Language: English
- Budget: $1,000,000 (estimated)
- Box office: $477,113

Let's Get Lost is a 1988 American documentary film, written and directed by Bruce Weber, about the turbulent life and career of jazz trumpeter Chet Baker, who died four months before the film's release. The title is derived from the song "Let's Get Lost" by Jimmy McHugh and Frank Loesser from the 1943 film Happy Go Lucky, which Baker recorded for Pacific Records.

== Synopsis ==
A group of people who knew Baker, ranging from ex-associates to ex-wives and children, talk about him and his life. Weber's film traces the musician's career from the 1950s, playing with jazz greats like Charlie Parker, Gerry Mulligan, and Russ Freeman, to the 1980s, when his heroin addiction and domestic upheavals led to a relocation to Europe. By juxtaposing these two decades, Weber presents a sharp contrast between the younger, handsome Baker — the statuesque idol who resembled a mix of James Dean and Jack Kerouac — to what he became, “a seamy looking drugstore cowboy-cum-derelict”, as J. Hoberman put it in his Village Voice review.

Let's Get Lost begins near the end of Baker's life, on the beaches of Santa Monica, and ends at the Cannes Film Festival. Weber uses these moments in the present as bookends to the historic footage contained in the bulk of the film. The documentation ranges from vintage photographs by William Claxton in 1953 to appearances on The Steve Allen Show and kitschy, low budget Italian films Baker did for quick money. Musician Michael "Flea" Balzary appears briefly, discussing trumpet playing with Baker.

== Development ==
Bruce Weber first became interested in Chet Baker when he spotted a photograph of the musician in a Pittsburgh record store on the cover of the 1955 vinyl LP Chet Baker Sings and Plays when he was 16 years old; the film's title comes from a song from the album.

Weber first met Baker in the winter of 1986 at a club in New York City and convinced him to do a photo shoot and what was originally only going to be a three-minute film. Weber had wanted to make a short film from an Oscar Levant song called "Blame It on My Youth". They had such a good time together that Baker started opening up to Weber. Afterwards, Weber convinced Baker to make a longer film and the musician agreed. Filming began in January 1987. Interviewing Baker was a challenge as Weber remembers, "Sometimes we'd have to stop for some reason or another and then, because Chet was a junkie and couldn't do things twice, we'd have to start all over again. But we grew to really like him".

"You'd decide that, when Chet finally gets up, you'll grab him and talk to him about the early days", Weber expanded to Time Out. "But then Chet gets here, and he's had a fight with his girlfriend, and he wants to record a song… So what happens is that your world becomes like a jazz suite. You have to go along with him".

In May 1987, when Weber's documentary Broken Noses premiered at the Cannes Film Festival, he brought Baker along to shoot footage for Let's Get Lost. Weber spent a million dollars of his own money on the documentary and filmed it when he had the time and the money, describing it as "a very ad hoc film".

== Reception and legacy ==
Let's Get Lost had its world premiere at the 1988 Toronto International Film Festival, four months after Chet Baker's death.

The documentary was well received by critics and currently has a 97% rating on Rotten Tomatoes. Entertainment Weekly gave the film an "A−" rating and said that Weber "created just about the only documentary that works like a novel, inviting you to read between the lines of Baker's personality until you touch the secret sadness at the heart of his beauty". In her review for the Los Angeles Times, Carina Chocano wrote, "If there's a driving force to Weber's film, it seems to be delving into the nature and purpose of star quality and personal magnetism, which Baker had in droves but which didn't save him". In his review for The Washington Post, Hal Hinson wrote that what Weber "provides us is rapturous, deeply involving, and more than a little puzzling". Terrence Rafferty, in his review for The New York Times, wrote, "The enduring fascination of Let's Get Lost, the reason it remains powerful even now, when every value it represents is gone, is that it's among the few movies that deal with the mysterious, complicated emotional transactions involved in the creation of pop culture — and with the ambiguous process by which performers generate desire".

A newly restored print was screened at the 2008 Cannes Film Festival.

The film was spoofed on the mockumentary series Documentary Now as Long Gone.

=== Awards ===
Let's Get Lost was nominated for an Academy Award for Best Documentary Feature in 1989.

It won the Italian Critics' Prize at the Venice Film Festival.

== Musical score and soundtrack ==
Let's Get Lost

Soundtrack album by Chet Baker
- Released: 1989
- Recorded: January–May, 1987
- Studios: Sage & Sound Studios, Hollywood, CA and Studio Davout Paris, France
- Genre: Film score
- Length: 62:56 CD release with additional tracks
- Labels: RCA Novus; 3054-1-N
- Producer: Steve Backer

Chet Baker chronology
Cool Cat (1986)	Let's Get Lost (1989)	Chet Baker in Tokyo (1987)

The film score features performances by Baker from the 1950s and 1960s along with newly recorded performances from 1987 and the soundtrack album was released on the RCA Novus label (full title Chet Baker Sings and Plays from the Film "Let's Get Lost") in 1989.

"Baker is my favourite vocalist of the century," Björk told Q. "There were two albums – both with the same title, ridiculously – which were released with Bruce Weber's film of his life, Let's Get Lost. One was recorded when the film was being made, when he was older, and the other with all the stuff he sung when he was young, which I prefer… he's the only singer I've ever been able to identify with. I love the fact he's so expressive, so overemotional. It's classic stuff; it makes me soft in my knees… He was so into it: like, 'Fuck those notes I'm singing, and fuck those songs I'm singing – what I want is the emotion.' That's how I feel about it too."

Baker's recording of "Chetty's Lullaby" with Ennio Morricone as conductor of his orchestra was also featured in the film. Baker brought his 1985 recording of "So Hard To Know" from Brazil to include in the film.

=== Reception ===
Professional ratings
Review scores
Source	Rating
AllMusic	4/5 stars

Lindsay Planer of AllMusic retrospectively stated, "Even though time and substances have given Baker the visage of a man twice his age, those inimitable pipes and velvet tone have worn surprisingly well. The track list is quite literally replete with something old, new, borrowed, and blue ... Ironically, the title song "Let's Get Lost" isn't on this album. While the tune was in the documentary, it is the familiar 1956 version. This leads to one of the primary criticisms that can be leveled at this collection – it would have been well served by a supplementary volume of vintage Baker featured in the movie, although presumably licensing prohibited such".

=== Track listing ===
1. "Moon & Sand" (Alec Wilder, Morty Palitz, William Engvick) – 5:30
2. "Imagination" (Jimmy Van Heusen, Johnny Burke) – 4:52
3. "You're My Thrill" (Jay Gorney, Sidney Clare) – 4:59
4. "For Heaven's Sake" (Sherman Edwards, Elise Bretton, Donald Meyer) – 4:51 Additional track on CD release
5. "Every Time We Say Goodbye" (Cole Porter) – 4:48
6. "I Don't Stand a Ghost of a Chance with You" (Victor Young, Bing Crosby, Ned Washington) – 5:03 Additional track on CD release
7. "Day Dream" (Billy Strayhorn, Duke Ellington, John La Touche) – 5:00
8. "Zingaro" (Antônio Carlos Jobim) – 7:33
9. "Blame It on My Youth" (Oscar Levant, Edward Heyman) – 6:18
10. "My One and Only Love" (Guy Wood, Robert Mellin) – 5:30
11. "Everything Happens to Me" (Tom Adair, Matt Dennis) – 5:19 Additional track on CD release
12. "Almost Blue" (Elvis Costello) – 3:13

=== Musicians ===
- Chet Baker – trumpet, vocals
- Frank Strazzeri, piano
- John Leftwich – bass
- Ralph Penland – drums (tracks 1, 3–6)
- Nicola Stilo – guitar (track 8)

=== Swimming by Moonlight ===
Swimming by Moonlight, a double album set of previously unreleased live and studio recordings by Chet Baker from the period of the making of Bruce Weber’s documentary Let’s Get Lost, was released on November 7, 2025.

== Home media ==
Let's Get Lost was released on VHS and Laserdisc in Japan by Nippon Columbia on November 21, 1993.

Let's Get Lost was originally going to be released on DVD in 2007 along with an expanded version of the film's soundtrack. According to Weber, the DVD was to be released in December 2007 but failed to do so. The DVD was released in the United Kingdom on July 28, 2008. The DVD was finally released in the United States by Docurama on December 3, 2013. A Blu-ray edition was released in Italy for Region B.

It is also available for streaming and downloading.
