= Curtis Amy =

American jazz saxophonist (1927–2002)

- Born: Curtis Edward Amy; October 11, 1927; Houston, Texas, U.S.
- Died: June 5, 2002 (aged 74) Los Angeles, California, U.S.
- Genres: Jazz
- Occupation: Musician
- Instrument: Saxophone
- Years active: 1950s–1970s
- Labels: Pacific Jazz, Verve

Curtis Edward Amy (October 11, 1927 – June 5, 2002) was an American jazz saxophonist.

== Biography ==
Amy was born in Houston, Texas, United States. He learned how to play clarinet before joining the Army, and during his time in service, picked up the tenor saxophone. After his discharge, he attended and graduated from Kentucky State College. He worked as an educator in Tennessee while playing in midwestern jazz clubs. In the mid-1950s, he relocated to Los Angeles and later signed with Pacific Jazz Records, often playing with organist Paul Bryant. In the mid-1960s, he spent three years as musical director of Ray Charles' orchestra, together with his wife, Merry Clayton, and Steve Huffsteter.

As well as leading his own bands and recording albums under his own name, Amy did session work and played the solos on several recordings, including The Doors song "Touch Me", Carole King's Tapestry, and Lou Rawls' first albums, Black and Blue and Tobacco Road, coinciding with Dexter Gordon in the Onzy Matthews big band, as well as working with Marvin Gaye, Tammi Terrell and Smokey Robinson.

Up until his death, he was married to singer and recording artist Merry Clayton. Their son, Kevin Amy has also pursued a musical career.

Carole King's song "Jazzman", from her 1974 album Wrap Around Joy, was inspired by her experience working with Amy on the Tapestry album.

== Discography ==
=== As leader ===
- The Blues Message (Pacific Jazz, 1960)
- Meetin' Here (Pacific Jazz, 1961)
- Groovin' Blue (Pacific Jazz, 1961)
- Tippin' on Through (Pacific Jazz, 1962)
- Way Down (Pacific Jazz, 1962)
- Katanga! (Pacific Jazz, 1963)
- The Sounds of Broadway/The Sounds of Hollywood (Palomar, 1965)
- Mustang (Verve, 1966)
- Jungle Adventure in Music and Sound (Coliseum, 1966)
- Peace For Love (Fresh Sounds 1994)

=== As sideman ===
With Roy Ayers

- West Coast Vibes (United Artists, 1963)

With The Doors

- The Soft Parade (Elektra, 1969)

With Don Everly

- Don Everly (Ode, 1970)

With Dizzy Gillespie

- Jazz Recital (Norgran, 1956)

With Carole King

- Tapestry (Ode, 1971)

With Lou Rawls

- Black and Blue (Capitol, 1963)
- Tobacco Road (Capitol, 1963)

With Gerald Wilson

- On Stage (Pacific Jazz, 1965)
- Feelin' Kinda Blues (Pacific Jazz, 1965)
