= Frank Campo =

American composer (1927–2026)

- Born: February 4, 1927; New York City, U.S.
- Died: August 10, 2026 (aged 99)
- Era: Contemporary
- Works: Dall'ombra alla luce, Dialogues II, Op. 126, Trio, Op. 87

Frank Campo (February 4, 1927 – August 10, 2026) was an American composer. He was Emeritus Professor of Music at California State University Northridge.

== Life and career ==
Frank Campo was born on February 4, 1927.

Campo died on August 10, 2026, at the age of 99.

== Selected recorded works ==
- Dall'ombra alla luce
- Dialogues II, Op. 126
- Trio, Op. 87
- Variations on a Theme of Paganini
