= Chet Baker in Tokyo =

- Originally designed for Chet Baker in Tokyo: Memories (1988).

Live album by Chet Baker
- Released: October 21, 1993
- Recorded: June 14, 1987
- Venue: Hitomi Memorial Hall, Showa Women's University, Tokyo, Japan
- Genre: Cool Jazz, West Coast Jazz
- Length: 115:14
- Label: King; Paddle Wheel; Evidence Music
- Producer: Yoichi Nakao

Alternative cover

Cover art for Chet Baker in Tokyo: Four
- The original release featured, on its booklet cover, the artwork from Chet Baker in Tokyo: Four (1989).

Chet Baker in Tokyo is a live album by jazz trumpeter and singer Chet Baker, recorded at Showa Women's University's Hitomi Memorial Hall. Recorded just eleven months before his death, the album has been hailed as "A glorious moment in Chet Baker's twilight." This double album was originally released as two separate albums: Disc One was released in September 1988 as Chet Baker in Tokyo: Memories, and Disc Two was released in January 1989 as Chet Baker in Tokyo: Four.

== Reception ==
Professional ratings
Review scores
Source	Rating
Allmusic	4/5 stars

John Vinocur of The New York Times praised the album, saying:

The performances are remarkable because they take in, at the highest level, everything that people said Chet could do – play ballads with almost painful, poetic eloquence – and what many said he could not: blow hard and tough enough so as to make the trumpet sound its essence.

Rick Anderson of AllMusic said the album "shows he was still in complete control of his musical faculties, playing not just beautifully and well, but with energy and even speed despite his deteriorating health."

== Track listing ==
Disc one:

1. "Stella by Starlight" – 10:50
2. "For Minors Only" – 7:40
3. "Almost Blue" – 7:53
4. "Portrait in Black and White" – 15:46
5. "My Funny Valentine" – 13:14

Disc two:

1. "Four" – 7:28
2. "Arborway" – 14:00
3. "I'm A Fool to Want You" – 11:22
4. "Seven Steps to Heaven" – 7:56
5. "For All We Know" – 8:57
6. "Broken Wing" – 10:08

== Personnel ==
=== Musicians ===
- Chet Baker – trumpet & vocals
- Harold Danko – piano
- Hein Van Der Geyn – acoustic bass
- John Engels – drums

=== Production ===
- Yoichi Nakao – Producer
