= The Raelettes =

1950s–2000s American girl group

- Also known as: Ray Charles and the Raelettes
- Origin: United States
- Genres: R&B, pop, soul
- Occupation: Girl group
- Years active: 1950s–2000s
- Label: Tangerine/ABC-Paramount
- Past members: Ray Charles; Merry Clayton; Susaye Greene; Margie Hendrix; Denise Jackson; Mable John; Clydie King; Lalomie Washburn; Edna Wright; See also: Other members

The Raelettes (or occasionally The Raelets or The Raeletts) were an American women group formed in 1958 to provide backing vocals for Ray Charles. They were reformed from the group The Cookies. Between 1966 and 1973, the Raelettes recorded on Tangerine Records as a separate act produced and accompanied by Charles.

== History ==
Reformed by Ray Charles from the all-girl singing group The Cookies, Charles first invited the group for a recording session in New York City, in August 1956, where they taped "Lonely Avenue", "I Want To Know" and "Leave My Woman Alone". The Cookies' lineup at the time consisted of Margie Hendrix, Dorothy Jones, and Darlene McCrea.

The Raelettes were officially established in 1958. The first lineup consisted of Darlene McCrea, Margie Hendrix, Priscilla "Pat" Lyles, and Gwendolyn Berry. The Raelettes were an integral part of Charles' organization and provided backing vocals on various hits, such as "Night Time Is the Right Time" (1958), "What'd I Say" (1959) and "Hit the Road Jack" (1961).

In the early years, Margie Hendrix was the Raelettes' foremost member. Ray Charles said about her: "Aretha, Gladys, Etta James — these gals are all bad, but on any given night, Margie will scare you to death." Ray and Margie had many affairs, but she started using drugs and alcohol and after a final argument in 1964, she was fired from the Raelettes and later died in 1973.

The group always consisted of 4 or 5 singers. The ever-changing lineup included Minnie Riperton, Merry Clayton, Clydie King of the Blackberries, Edna Wright of Honey Cone, and latter-day Supreme Susaye Greene.

Charles also produced and played piano on solo singles for various Raelettes. He formed Tangerine Records in 1962, and the Raelettes released three top 40 R&B hits between 1967 and 1971: "One Hurt Deserves Another" (1967), "I'm Gettin' 'Long All Right" (1968), and "Bad Water" (1971). The compilation Souled Out was released in 1970, featuring songs R&B duo Ike & Tina Turner had recorded for Tangerine.

In the 1970s, Mable John sang lead vocals and the Raelettes toured independent of Charles. After she left, the Raelettes returned to the background for good, with various lineups backing Charles until his death in 2004.

== Members ==
- Shalaine Adams (selected but never performed, 2005)
- Mabel Armed (1969)
- Fritz Basket (1964–1965)
- Dorothy Berry (1971–1980)
- Gwen "Squatty Roo" Berry (1960–1968)
- Tangy Biggers (1999)
- Anita Brooks (1989)
- Alexandra Brown (1966–1968)
- Helen Bryant (1964)
- Dottie Clark (1964)
- Merry Clayton (1966–1968)
- Chrylynn Cobb (1978)
- Trudy Cochran (1977–1991)
- Kathryn Collier (c. 1973)
- Sharon Creighton (1986–1987)
- Pamela Diggs-De Ramus (1992)
- Karen Evans (1996–1999)
- Verlyn Flenaugh (1968)
- Lillian Fort (1964–1965)
- Valerie Geason
- Renee Georges (1994–1996, 2000–2003)
- Deborah Gleese (1977)
- Rita Graham (1968–1969)
- Susaye Greene (1968–1975)
- Katrina Harper-Cooke (1997)
- Avis Harrell (1979–1982)
- Margie Hendrix (1955–1964)
- Peggy Hutcherson (1966)
- Denise Jackson (1973)
- Doretta James (1957)
- Mable John (1968–1978, 1998)
- Ann Johnson (1981–1985)
- Clydie King (1966–1968)
- Jean King (1963)
- Beverly Ann Lesure (1968)
- Pat Lion (1957)
- Pat (Priscilla) Lyles (1955–1965)
  a.k.a. Pat Mosley
- Kathy Mackey (1997)
- Tammy McCann (2001)
- Marilyn McCoo (1965)
- Gladezz McCoy
- Darlene McCrea (1956–1964)
- Tonette McKinney (1994–2003)
- Paula Michelle Moye(1991)
- Janice Mitchell (1981–1986)
- Mae Mosely-Lyles (1959–1961)
  a.k.a. Mae Mosely-Saunders
- Vernita Moss (1969–1975)
- Paula Moye (1991–1992)
- Kay Nickerson (1989–1994)
- Pat Peterson (1980–1989)
- Bobbie Pierce (1964)
- Madelyn Quebec (1973–1987)
- Patricia Richards (1963)
- Minnie Riperton
- Donna M. Jones
- Ruby Rae Roberson (1959–1960)
- Vermettya Royster (1965–1966)
- Cynthia Scott (1972–1974)
- Linda Sims (1975–1978)
- Bettye Smith (1960)
- Gwendolyn Smith (1988–1991)
- Joy Styles (2005)
- Barbara Nell Terrault (1968)
- Brianna Perry Tucker (2001–2002)
- Andromeda Turre (selected but never performed, 2005)
- Lalomie Washburn (1990)
- Tracey Whitney (1991)
- Elaine Woodard (1983–1987)
- Angela Workman (1987–1999)
- Edna Wright (1966)
- Estella Yarbrough (1969–2003)

== Discography ==
=== Albums ===
- 1970: Souled Out (Tangerine 1511) – The Raelets with Ike & Tina Turner
- 1972: (Ray Charles Presents) The Raeletts, Yesterday... Today... Tomorrow (Tangerine 1515)
- 1993: The Raelettes, Hits And Rarities (Titanic Records TR-CD 4422)

=== Singles ===
Single (A-side, B-side)	Year	Label & Cat No.	Peak chart positions	
Single (A-side, B-side)	Year	Label & Cat No.	US	US R&B
"One Hurt Deserves Another" b/w "One Room Paradise"	1967	Tangerine 972	76	24
"Into Something Fine" b/w "Lover's Blues"	1967	Tangerine 976	—	—
"I Want to Thank You" b/w "It's Almost Here"	1968	Tangerine 986	—	47
"I'm Gettin' 'Long All Right" b/w "All I Need Is His Love"	1968	Tangerine 984	—	23
"I Want To (Do Everything for You)" b/w "Keep It to Yourself"	1970	Tangerine 1006	96	39
"Bad Water" b/w "That Goes to Show You"	1971	Tangerine 1014	58	40
"Here I Go Again" b/w "Leave My Man Alone"	1971	Tangerine 1017	101	—
"Come Get It, I Got It" b/w "Try a Little Kindness"	1972	Tangerine 1024	—	—
"You Must Be Doing Alright" b/w "You Have a Way with Me"	1973	Tangerine 1029	—	—
"If You Wanna Keep Him" b/w "Many Rivers to Cross"	1973	Tangerine 1031	—	—
"—" denotes releases that did not chart.
