= Free Jazz Festival =

Brazilian music festival (1985–2001)

- Genre: jazz
- Dates: two weeks in September, annually
- Locations: Rio de Janeiro and São Paulo, Brazil
- Years active: 1985–2001
- Founders: Monique and Sylvia Gardenberg

The Free Jazz Festival was a two-week annual music festival debuting in 1985 with performances taking place in Rio de Janeiro and São Paulo. It ran between 1985 and 2001 featuring Chet Baker, Hubert Laws, Little Richard, Chuck Berry, BB King, Al Green, James Brown, Etta James, Nina Simone, Chick Corea, Sarah Vaughan, Pat Metheny, Toots Thielemans, Bobby McFerrin, Sonny Rollins, Ernie Watts, Joe Pass, and McCoy Tyner and Stanley Jordan alongside Brazilian musicians Moacir Santos, Heraldo do Monte, Egberto Gismonti, Uakti, Marcio Montarroyos, Paulo Moura, and Sivuca.

The festival was founded by Monique and Sylvia Gardenberg, two sisters from Rio de Janeiro new on the Brazilian music scene. They secured sponsorship from Pan Am and the tobacco company Souza Cruz, a subsidiary of British American Tobaccos, who made "Free" cigarettes, naming the festival Free Jazz Festival. The name has no direct relation to Ornette Coleman's jazz style - on the contrary, the festival hosted a wide variety of performances, without being tied to any specific style, featuring everything from Chet Baker's cool jazz to Fatboy Slim's electronic music.

The success of the festival increased sales of jazz records in Brazil, influencing EMI and WEA Brazil to release more American jazz artists and Brazilian instrumental musicians.

In January 2003, an anti-smoking law came into force, which prohibited tobacco companies from sponsoring cultural and sporting events in Brazil, effectively putting an end to the festival. The telecommunications company TIM Brasil sponsored a successor known as the TIM Festival.
