= Maybeck Recital Hall =

Music venue in Berkeley, California, USA

Coordinates: 37°52′50″N 122°15′40″W

Maybeck Recital Hall, also known as Maybeck Studio for Performing Arts, is located inside the Kennedy-Nixon House located at 1537 Euclid Avenue in Berkeley, California, United States. It was built in 1914 by Bernard Maybeck. The hall seats up to 50 people and was designed upon commission for the Nixon family, local arts patrons who wanted a live-in studio for their daughter Milda's piano teacher, Mrs. Alma Kennedy. The room is paneled in unfinished clear-heart redwood, which contributes to an unusually rich and warm, yet bright and clear acoustic quality. There are two grand pianos in the space: a Yamaha S-400, and a Yamaha C7. Maybeck originally designed the space to accommodate an 1898 7-foot Bechstein.

== History ==
In 1923, the hall was destroyed in a hillside fire. It was rebuilt quickly by Maybeck.

Milda Nixon lived at the residence until her death in 1981 at the age of 92. Her adopted son, Charles R. Fulweiler, then held the house for several years. In 1987, the house was purchased by jazz pianist Dick Whittington, who opened the hall for public recitals.

Between 1989 and 1995, Concord Records produced 42 solo piano recitals in Maybeck Recital Hall. Each recital featured a different jazz pianist; the series eventually consisted of 42 CD. Concord also recorded 10 jazz duets at Maybeck during the same time period, which the label also released as a series of CDs.

In 1996, the house was purchased by Gregory Moore. The recital hall was no longer open for public concerts, although it was used for private concerts which were attended by invitation only. Since 2013, the newly named Maybeck Studio for the Performing Arts has continued the tradition of public concerts on Sundays at 3pm during their September–June season. The intimate hall seats 40 audience members.

== Albums ==
=== Live at Maybeck series ===
Volume	Artist
1: Live at Maybeck Recital Hall, Volume 1	Joanne Brackeen
2: Live at Maybeck Recital Hall, Volume Two	Dave McKenna
3: Music of 1937	Dick Hyman
4: Live at Maybeck Recital Hall, Volume Four	Walter Norris
5: Live at Maybeck Recital Hall, Volume Five	Stanley Cowell
6: Live at Maybeck Recital Hall, Volume Six	Hal Galper
7: Live at Maybeck Recital Hall, Volume Seven	John Hicks
8: Live at Maybeck Recital Hall, Volume Eight	Gerald Wiggins
9: Live at Maybeck Recital Hall, Volume Nine	Marian McPartland
10: Live at Maybeck Recital Hall, Volume Ten	Kenny Barron
11: Live at Maybeck Recital Hall, Volume Eleven	Roger Kellaway
12: Live at Maybeck Recital Hall, Volume Twelve	Barry Harris
13: Live at Maybeck Recital Hall, Volume Thirteen	Steve Kuhn
14: Live at Maybeck Recital Hall, Volume Fourteen	Alan Broadbent
15: Live at Maybeck Recital Hall, Volume Fifteen	Buddy Montgomery
16: Live at Maybeck Recital Hall, Volume Sixteen	Hank Jones
17: Jaki Byard at Maybeck	Jaki Byard
18: Mike Wofford at Maybeck	Mike Wofford
19: Richie Beirach at Maybeck	Richie Beirach
20: Jim McNeely at Maybeck	Jim McNeely
21 Jessica Williams at Maybeck	Jessica Williams
22: Ellis Larkins at Maybeck	Ellis Larkins
23: Gene Harris at Maybeck	Gene Harris
24: Adam Makowicz at Maybeck	Adam Makowicz
25: Cedar Walton at Maybeck	Cedar Walton
26: Bill Mays at Maybeck	Bill Mays
27: Denny Zeitlin at Maybeck	Denny Zeitlin
28: Andy LaVerne at Maybeck	Andy LaVerne
29: John Campbell at Maybeck	John Campbell
30: Ralph Sutton at Maybeck	Ralph Sutton
31: Fred Hersch at Maybeck	Fred Hersch
32: Maybeck Recital Hall Series, Volume Thirty-Two	Roland Hanna
33: Don Friedman at Maybeck	Don Friedman
34: Kenny Werner at Maybeck	Kenny Werner
35: George Cables at Maybeck	George Cables
36: Toshiko Akiyoshi at Maybeck	Toshiko Akiyoshi
37: John Colianni at Maybeck	John Colianni
38: Ted Rosenthal at Maybeck	Ted Rosenthal
39: Kenny Drew Jr. at Maybeck	Kenny Drew Jr.
40: Monty Alexander at Maybeck	Monty Alexander
41: Allen Farnham at Maybeck	Allen Farnham
42: James Williams at Maybeck	James Williams

=== Concord Duo series ===
1. Roger Kellaway & Red Mitchell
2. Dave McKenna & Gray Sargent
3. Ken Peplowski & Howard Alden
4. Alan Broadbent & Gary Foster
5. Adam Makowicz & George Mraz
6. Ralph Sutton & Dick Hyman
7. Bill Mays & Ed Bickert
8. Denny Zeitlin & David Friesen
9. Michael Moore & Bill Charlap
10. Chris Potter & Kenny Werner: Concord Duo Series Volume Ten
