= Dream Dancing (Cole Porter song) =

Song by Fred Astaire
- B-side: "The wedding cake walk"
- Written: Cole Porter
- Released: September 10, 1941
- Label: Decca

"Dream Dancing" is a song written by Cole Porter for the 1941 film You'll Never Get Rich, where it was introduced as an instrumental. The first recording was made by Fred Astaire (who also starred in the film) with Harry Sosnik and his Orchestra and The Delta Rhythm Boys in 1941 under the Decca label (#18188).

== Notable recordings ==
=== Vocal ===
- Tony Pastor and His Orchestra - So Near And Yet So Far (1941)
- Ella Fitzgerald – Dream Dancing (1978)
- Mel Tormé, George Shearing – An Evening at Charlie's (1983)
- Tony Bennett and Lady Gaga - for their collaborative album Love for Sale (2021)

=== Instrumental ===
- Dave McKenna – Live at Maybeck Recital Hall, Vol. 2 (1990)
- Spike Robinson – Reminiscin' (1992)
- Beegie Adair - Dream Dancing: Songs of Cole Porter (2001)
- Jan Lundgren – All By Myself [solo piano] (Fresh Sound) (2014)
