= Teddi King =

American singer (1929–1977)

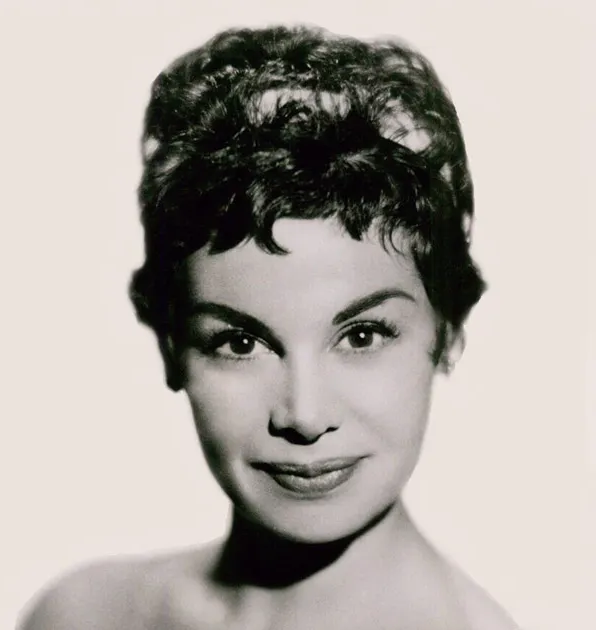
- King, c. 1950

Background information
- Born: Theodora King; September 18, 1929; Boston, Massachusetts, U.S.
- Died: November 18, 1977 (aged 48)
- Genres: Pop standards, jazz
- Instrument: Vocals
- Years active: 1949–1977
- Labels: RCA, Coral, Audiophile

Theodora King (September 18, 1929 – November 18, 1977) was an American jazz and pop vocalist.

King was born in Boston, Massachusetts, United States. She won a singing competition hosted by Dinah Shore at Boston's Tributary Theatre, later beginning work in a touring revue involved with "cheering up the military in the lull between the Second World War and the Korean conflict." Improving her vocal and piano technique during this time, she first recorded with Nat Pierce in 1949, later recording with the Beryl Booker trio and with several other small groups from 1954 to 1955 (recordings which were available on three albums for Storyville). She then toured with George Shearing for two years beginning in the summer of 1952, and for a time was managed by George Wein. King later began performing for a time in Las Vegas.

Ultimately signing with RCA, she recorded three albums for the label, beginning with 1956's Bidin' My Time. She also had some minor chart success with the singles "Mr. Wonderful" (which made the Top 20 in 1956), "Married I Can Always Get" and "Say It Isn't So" (both of which made the Billboard Hot 100 from 1957 to 1958). Her critically praised 1959 album All the Kings' Songs found her interpreting the signature songs of contemporary male singers like Frank Sinatra and Nat King Cole (the "kings" of the title). In the 1960s, she opened the Playboy Club, where she often performed.

After developing lupus, she managed to make a brief comeback with a 1977 album featuring Dave McKenna, and with two more albums recorded for Audiophile released posthumously. She died of the disease on November 18, 1977.

King's style, influenced by Lee Wiley, Mildred Bailey and Mabel Mercer, has won her a small but devoted cult following.

== Discography ==
- 'Round Midnight (Storyville, 1953)
- Now in Vogue (Storyville, Vogue in Europe, 1955)
- Storyville Presents Miss Teddi King (Storyville, Vogue in Europe, 1955)
- To You from Teddi King with George Siravo (RCA Victor, 1956)
- Bidin' My Time with Al Cohn (RCA Victor, 1956)
- A Girl and Her Songs (RCA Victor, 1957)
- All the Kings' Songs (Coral, 1959)
- Marian Remembers Teddi with Marian McPartland (Halcyon, 1974)
- Lovers & Losers (Audiophile, 1976)
- This Is New with Dave McKenna (Inner City, 1978)
- Someone to Light Up Your Life (Audiophile, 1979)
- In the Beginning (1949–1954) (Baldwin Street, 1999)
