= I Am Waiting =

I Am Waiting may refer to:

- I Am Waiting (film) (俺は待ってるぜ Ore wa matteru ze), 1957 Japanese film directed by Koreyoshi Kurahara
- "I Am Waiting" (song), song written by Rolling Stones from 1966 album Aftermath
- "I Am Waiting", song by Ollabelle from Ollabelle (album)
- "I Am Waiting", song by Cassandra Wilson from Point of View (Cassandra Wilson album)
- "I Am Waiting", song and 12" single by Vigil (band) 1986
- "I Am Waiting", song by jazz pianist Stanley Cowell Live at Maybeck Recital Hall, Volume Five, recorded in 1990
- "I Am Waiting", song by Mihailo Živanović
- "I Am Waiting", song by Jimmy Hotz
- "I Am Waiting", song written Rabin, Anderson from List of Yes concert tours (1980s–90s)
- "I Am Waiting", poem by Lawrence Ferlinghetti
