= Adam Makowicz at Maybeck =

Live album by Adam Makowicz
- Released: 1993
- Venues: Maybeck Recital Hall, Berkeley, California
- Genre: Jazz
- Label: Concord

Adam Makowicz at Maybeck: Maybeck Recital Hall Series Volume Twenty-Four is an album of solo piano performances by jazz pianist Adam Makowicz.

== Music and recording ==
The album was recorded at the Maybeck Recital Hall in Berkeley, California. The first track, "Tatum on My Mind", is a Makowicz original; the other ten tracks are Cole Porter compositions.

== Release and reception ==
Professional ratings
Review scores
Source	Rating
AllMusic	4.5/5 stars
The Penguin Guide to Jazz on CD	3/4 stars
The Virgin Encyclopedia of Jazz	3/5 stars

The album was released by Concord Records in 1993. The AllMusic review concluded that, "Although Makowicz has recorded sessions that contained more variety, his total command of the piano is particularly well displayed throughout this memorable set." The Chicago Tribune reviewer commented on the high speed of the playing on several tracks.

== Track listing ==
1. "Tatum on My Mind"
2. "Get Out of Town"
3. "Easy to Love"
4. "I Get a Kick Out of You"
5. "You Do Something to Me"
6. "I Concentrate on You"
7. "You'd Be So Nice to Come Home To"
8. "Night and Day"
9. "Begin the Beguine"
10. "Love for Sale"
11. "Just One of Those Things"

== Personnel ==
- Adam Makowicz – piano
