= John Colianni at Maybeck =

Live album by John Colianni
- Recorded: 1994
- Venue: Maybeck Recital Hall, Berkeley, California
- Genre: Jazz
- Label: Concord

John Colianni at Maybeck: Maybeck Recital Hall Series Volume 37 is an album of solo performances by jazz pianist John Colianni.

== Music and recording ==
The album was recorded at the Maybeck Recital Hall in Berkeley, California in 1994. The material includes perhaps the first jazz reading of Kurt Cobain's "Heart-Shaped Box".

== Release and reception ==
Professional ratings
Review scores
Source	Rating
AllMusic	3/5 stars
The Penguin Guide to Jazz	3/4 stars
The Virgin Encyclopedia of Jazz	4/5 stars

The AllMusic reviewer wrote: "this mostly conventional recital is far from a statement of rebellion, or a statement of anything other than the usual generic veneration of the old masters", and praised the juxtaposition of "Goodbye" and "Heart-Shaped Box" at the end of the album. The Penguin Guide to Jazz wrote that the album "is about par for the course and, though Colianni plays as well as he ever has on record, there's not a great deal of special distinction about it". Don Heckman of the Los Angeles Times called Colianni "a masterful technician," and stated: "The Maybeck series... usually brings out the best in pianists, and Colianni’s performance here is no exception."

== Track listing ==
1. "Blue and Sentimental"
2. "Stardust"
3. "What's Your Story, Morning Glory?"
4. "It Never Entered My Mind"
5. "Londonderry Air"
6. "Don't Stop the Carnival"
7. "When Your Lover Has Gone"
8. "Ja-Da"
9. "Basin Street Blues"
10. "I Never Knew"
11. "Baby Won't You Please Come Home"
12. "Tea for Two"
13. "Goodbye"
14. "Heart-Shaped Box"

== Personnel ==
- John Colianni – piano
