= I Should Care =

Song
- Published: 1944 by Dorsey Bros. Music
- Songwriters: Axel Stordahl, Paul Weston and Sammy Cahn

"I Should Care" is a popular song with music by Axel Stordahl and Paul Weston and lyrics by Sammy Cahn, published in 1944. Cahn said that the title came to him by the time they played the first 4 bars. It first appeared in the MGM film Thrill of a Romance.

The song has become both a popular standard and a jazz standard, with recordings by many artists.

== Notable recordings ==
- Frank Sinatra – 1945 recording with orchestra directed by Axel Stordahl (78 single B-side of "When Your Lover Has Gone")
- Peggy Lee – 1945 transcription recording with Dave Barbour and His Orchestra
- Harry James – 1946 recording live at Meadowbrook Gardens, CA (One Night Stand With Harry James, 1975, Joyce LP-1014)
- Bud Powell – 1947 recording on The Bud Powell Trio (1951), Blues in the Closet (1956), Budism (1962), and Earl Bud Powell, Vol. 10 – Award at Birdland, 64 (1964)
- Dizzy Gillespie and His Orchestra with Johnny Hartman – recorded 1949 (The Complete RCA Victor Recordings, 1995)
- Ralph Flanagan and His Orchestra – single B-side c/w "Tippin' In" (1952)
- Jeff Chandler – 45 rpm single (1953)
- June Christy (with Orchestra dir. by Pete Rugolo) – Something Cool (1954)
- Julie London – Julie Is Her Name (1955)
- Nat Adderley – Introducing Nat Adderley (1955)
- Nat King Cole with Orchestra cond. by Billy May – Just One of Those Things (1957)
- Thelonious Monk – Thelonious Himself (1957), Solo Monk (1965)
- Mel Tormé – Tormé (1958)
- Stan Kenton – 1958 recording, At the Rendezvous: Vol. 2 (1989)
- The Four Freshmen – Love Lost (1959)
- Bill Evans Trio – How My Heart Sings! (1962), and on several concert recordings in 1965 and 1966 in Europe and in New York.
- Gloria Lynne in 1964
- Mina – Dedicato a mio padre (1967)
- Taco – After Eight (1982)
- John Abercrombie – Solar (1984)
- Marian McPartland – Live at Maybeck Recital Hall, Volume Nine (1991)
- Amy Winehouse – At the BBC (2012)

== Literature ==
- I Should Care (Transcription). Jazz Research News 6
- Stephan Richter: The Beauty of Building, Dwelling, and Monk: Aesthetics, Religion, and the Architectural Qualities of Jazz. African American Review, Vol. 29, No. 2 (1995), S. 259–268
