= Music of 1937 =

Live album by Dick Hyman
- Released: 1990
- Recorded: February 1990
- Venue: Maybeck Recital Hall, Berkeley, California, U.S.
- Genre: Jazz
- Label: Concord

Music of 1937: Maybeck Recital Hall Series, Volume Three is an album of solo performances by jazz pianist Dick Hyman.

== Music and recording ==
The album was recorded at the Maybeck Recital Hall in Berkeley, California in February 1990. The eleven compositions debuted in the year 1937.

== Release and reception ==
Professional ratings
Review scores
Source	Rating
AllMusic	4/5 stars
The Penguin Guide to Jazz	3.5/4 stars

It was released by Concord Records in 1990. The AllMusic reviewer concluded: "The wide range of emotions [...] and Hyman's typically brilliant playing on the solo recital make this CD a particular standout." The Penguin Guide to Jazz commented on Hyman's "sprightly and glowing readings" of the largely dated material.

== Track listing ==
1. "Spoken Introduction"
2. "Where or When"
3. "A Foggy Day"
4. "Bob White (Whatcha Gonna Swing Tonight?)"
5. "Someday My Prince Will Come"
6. "The Folks Who Live on the Hill"
7. "Bei Mir Bist du Schön"
8. "Loch Lomond"
9. "Thanks for the Memory"
10. "In the Still of the Night"
11. "My Funny Valentine"
12. "Caravan"

== Personnel ==
- Dick Hyman – piano
