= Kenny Werner at Maybeck =

Live album by Don Friedman
- Recorded: February 1994
- Venue: Maybeck Recital Hall, Berkeley, California
- Genre: Jazz
- Label: Concord

Kenny Werner at Maybeck: Maybeck Recital Hall Series Volume Thirty-Four is an album of solo performances by jazz pianist Kenny Werner.

== Music and recording ==
The album was recorded at the Maybeck Recital Hall in Berkeley, California in February 1994. The material includes "Naima".

== Release and reception ==
Professional ratings
Review scores
Source	Rating
AllMusic	4/5 stars
The Penguin Guide to Jazz	3/4 stars

The AllMusic reviewer called the album "A most attractive entry in the long Maybeck line." The Penguin Guide to Jazz suggested that Werner was better when playing his own material.

== Track listing ==
1. "Roberta Moon"
2. "Someday My Prince Will Come"
3. "In Your Own Sweet Way/Naima"
4. "Autumn Leaves"
5. "Try to Remember/St. Thomas"
6. "Guru"
7. "A Child Is Born"

== Personnel ==
- Kenny Werner – piano
