= Live at Maybeck Recital Hall, Volume Thirteen =

Live album by Steve Kuhn
- Released: 1991
- Recorded: November 1990
- Venue: Maybeck Recital Hall, Berkeley, California, U.S.
- Genre: Jazz
- Label: Concord

Live at Maybeck Recital Hall, Volume Thirteen is an album of solo performances by jazz pianist Steve Kuhn, recorded in 1990.

== Music and recording ==
The album was recorded in November 1990 at the Maybeck Recital Hall in Berkeley, California. Kuhn deconstructs and then reconstructs "I Remember You" and "Autumn in New York".

Pianist Liam Noble described Kuhn's performance of "Old Folks": "the colla voce movement punctuated by long right hand breaks and eccentric repeated notes, a sound that he's made his own over the years. He goes where his fingers take him: and when he hits the stride section, it's a peculiar, clipped feel like [Thelonious] Monk's but with less front on the note".

== Release and reception ==
Professional ratings
Review scores
Source	Rating
AllMusic	4/5 stars
The Penguin Guide to Jazz	3.5/4 stars

Live at Maybeck Recital Hall, Volume Thirteen was released by Concord Records. The Penguin Guide to Jazz concluded that the album was "Impressive and worthwhile", but commented that "Kuhn's sometimes extreme opposition of left and right hands [...] still betrays a certain crudity towards the bass end." The AllMusic reviewer wrote that, "This very satisfying concert CD is well-worth acquiring".

== Track listing ==
1. "Old Folks"
2. "Solar"
3. "Don't Explain"
4. "I Remember You"
5. "Autumn in New York"
6. "The Meaning of the Blues"

== Personnel ==
- Steve Kuhn – piano
