= Gene Harris at Maybeck =

Live album by Gene Harris
- Released: 1993
- Recorded: August 1992
- Venue: Maybeck Recital Hall, Berkeley, California
- Genre: Jazz
- Label: Concord

Gene Harris at Maybeck: Maybeck Recital Hall Series Volume Twenty-Three is an album of solo performances by jazz pianist Gene Harris.

== Music and recording ==
The album was recorded at the Maybeck Recital Hall in Berkeley, California, in August 1992. "Lu's Blues" is played at a slow tempo; "Elephant Blossom Blues" is much faster; and "Blues for Rhonda" "emphasizes a percussive, boogie woogie-like approach".

== Release and reception ==
Professional ratings
Review scores
Source	Rating
AllMusic	4.5/5 stars
The Penguin Guide to Jazz	3/4 stars

The album was released by Concord Records in 1993. The AllMusic review ended with the line: "Don't miss this excellent date." The Chicago Tribune reviewer wrote that Harris' style was "conventional [...] with a swinging stride to his approach". The Penguin Guide to Jazz described it as "typically straight-ahead and without frills".

== Track listing ==
1. "Lu's Blues"
2. "Penthouse Serenade (When We're Alone)"
3. "Old Folks"
4. "In the Wee Small Hours of the Morning"
5. "Elephant Blossom Blues"
6. "My Funny Valentine"
7. "They Can't Take That Away from Me"
8. "Blues for Rhonda"
9. "Angel Eyes"
10. "Erroll's Theme"

== Personnel ==
- Gene Harris – piano
