= Maybeck Recital Hall Series, Volume Thirty-Two =

Live album by Roland Hanna
- Released: 1994
- Recorded: August 1993
- Venue: Maybeck Recital Hall, Berkeley, California
- Genre: Jazz
- Label: Concord

Maybeck Recital Hall Series, Volume Thirty-Two is an album of solo performances by jazz pianist Roland Hanna.

== Music and recording ==
The album was recorded at the Maybeck Recital Hall in Berkeley, California in August 1993. The material is mostly Gershwin compositions, including medleys.

== Release and reception ==
Professional ratings
Review scores
Source	Rating
AllMusic	4.5/5 stars
The Penguin Guide to Jazz	3.5/4 stars
The Rolling Stone Jazz & Blues Album Guide	4/5 stars
The Encyclopedia of Popular Music	4/5 stars

The Penguin Guide to Jazz highlighted Hanna's use of chromaticism. The AllMusic reviewer wrote that Hanna "mixes his stride, Tatum, bop and classical strains freely, but with the structure of his instant compositions always in mind, the signs of a musician who knows how to put together a satisfying solo piano gig". A reviewer for Billboard praised Hanna's "offbeat, intricate arrangements" and "idiosyncratic melodic vision". Ron Welburn of JazzTimes expressed admiration for the voicings on "Love Walked In" and stated that the "bluesy intro would allow you to drift leisurely at will".

== Track listing ==
1. "Love Walked In"
2. "They Can't Take That Away from Me"
3. "Softly, As in a Morning Sunrise"
4. "Fascinating Rhythm/The Man I Love/Let's Call the Whole Thing Off"
5. "How Long Has This Been Going On?"
6. "Oleo"
7. "Lush Life"
8. "This Can't Be Love"

== Personnel ==
- Roland Hanna – piano
