= Live at Maybeck Recital Hall, Volume Sixteen =

Live album by Hank Jones
- Released: 1992
- Recorded: November 11, 1991
- Venues: Maybeck Recital Hall, Berkeley, California
- Genre: Jazz
- Length: 59:37
- Label: Concord
- Producer: Carl Jefferson

Hank Jones chronology
The Oracle (1989)	Live at Maybeck Recital Hall, Volume Sixteen (1992)	Steal Away (1995)

Live at Maybeck Recital Hall, Volume Sixteen is a solo piano album by Hank Jones, recorded at the Maybeck Recital Hall in Berkeley, California.

== Reception ==
Professional ratings
Review scores
Source	Rating
AllMusic	4.5/5 stars
The Penguin Guide to Jazz Recordings	3.5/4 stars

The album was positively reviewed by Richard S. Ginell at AllMusic, who wrote that the album was "one of the most musical, and certainly one of the most enjoyable, concerts" in Concord's Maybeck Hall recital series, and wrote that Jones "always chooses his notes with care while rarely losing touch with the pulse of jazz, which is all too tempting in a solo format." Pianist Liam Noble described the performance of "'Round Midnight": "Tiny variations in voicing, placement and colour just seem to jump out... at times the lead line sounds almost quieter than the accompaniment and yet draws your ear straight to it."

== Track listing ==
1. Introduction - 0:14
2. "I Guess I'll Have to Change My Plan" (Howard Dietz, Arthur Schwartz) - 3:15
3. "It's the Talk of the Town" (Jerry Livingston, Al J. Neiburg, Marty Symes) - 3:47
4. "The Very Thought of You" (Ray Noble) - 5:00
5. "The Night We Called It a Day" (Tom Adair, Matt Dennis) - 3:20
6. "Bluesette" (Norman Gimbel, Toots Thielemans) - 3:07
7. "A Child Is Born" (Thad Jones) - 4:37
8. "What Is This Thing Called Love?" (Cole Porter) - 3:34
9. "Oh, What a Beautiful Morning" (Oscar Hammerstein II, Richard Rodgers) - 5:04
10. "Six and Four" (Hank Jones) - 3:43
11. "I Cover the Waterfront" (Johnny Green, Edward Heyman) - 4:20
12. "Memories of You" (Eubie Blake, Andy Razaf) - 4:24
13. Introduction - 0:14
14. "Blue Monk" (Thelonious Monk) - 4:44
15. "'Round Midnight" (Bernie Hanighen, Monk, Cootie Williams) - 5:06
16. Introduction - 0:19
17. "Oh! Look at Me Now" (Joe Bushkin, John DeVries) - 4:38

== Personnel ==
- Hank Jones – piano
- Kent Judkins - art direction
- Phil Edwards - assembly
- Barbara Fisher - assistant engineer
- Nick Phillips - assistant producer
- David Luke - engineer
- Leonard Feather - liner notes
- George Horn - mastering
- James Gudeman - photography
- Carl Jefferson - producer
- John Burk - production coordination
- Bud Spangler - remote recording coordinator
