= Jim McNeely at Maybeck =

Live album by Jim McNeely
- Recorded: January 1992
- Venue: Maybeck Recital Hall, Berkeley, California
- Genre: Jazz
- Label: Concord

Jim McNeely at Maybeck: Maybeck Recital Hall Series Volume Twenty is an album of solo performances by jazz pianist Jim McNeely.

== Music and recording ==
The album was recorded at the Maybeck Recital Hall in Berkeley, California in January 1992. McNeely plays "There Will Never Be Another You" in all twelve keys.

== Release and reception ==
Professional ratings
Review scores
Source	Rating
AllMusic	4/5 stars
The Penguin Guide to Jazz	4/4 stars

The AllMusic review concluded: "Sometimes the inspiration level is uneven, but the payoff is high when all cylinders are pumping." The Penguin Guide to Jazz wrote of McNeely that "for all the clarity of his touch, he takes in more of the keyboard in each improvisation than many do over a whole recital". Pianist Liam Noble described the performance of "'Round Midnight" as "updating the chord sequence to a kind of post-Bill Evans modality that only unsettle at the very edges of the image".

== Track listing ==
1. "Introductory Announcement" – 0:12
2. "There Will Never Be Another You" (Harry Warren, Mack Gordon) – 5:14
3. "Zingaro" (Antônio Carlos Jobim) – 8:58
4. "Bye-Ya" (Thelonious Monk) – 6:46
5. "'Round Midnight" (Monk, Cootie Williams, Bernard Hanighen) – 7:39
6. "Un Poco Loco" (Bud Powell) – 5:51
7. "Touch" (Jim McNeely) – 8:41
8. "All the Things You Are" (Jerome Kern, Oscar Hammerstein II) – 6:42
9. "Body and Soul" (Johnny Green, Edward Heyman, Robert Sour, Frank Eyton) – 8:21
10. "Breaking up, Breaking Out" (McNeely) – 6:33

== Personnel ==
- Jim McNeely – piano
