= Windmills of Your Mind (Bud Shank album) =

Studio album by Bud Shank
- Released: 1969
- Recorded: 1969; Los Angeles, CA
- Genre: Jazz
- Label: Pacific Jazz; ST-20157
- Producer: Richard Bock

Bud Shank chronology
Magical Mystery (1967)	Windmills of Your Mind (1969)	Let It Be (1970)

Windmills of Your Mind is an album by the saxophonist Bud Shank recorded in 1969 for the Pacific Jazz label. The album features music by Michel Legrand who also provided the arrangements.

== Reception ==
Professional ratings
Review scores
Source	Rating
The Virgin Encyclopedia of Fifties Music	2/5 stars

In a review for JazzWax, Marc Myers wrote that, on the album, Shank "wasn't turning on or selling out. Instead, his hard sound and all-out blowing on alto sax and flute gave the music a speeding-MG, mid-life crisis sophistication. On Windmills of Your Mind, he fed Michel Legrand's jazz-based pop melodies through the Bud Shank jazz grinder, resisting the temptation to convert the film tunes into adult contemporary fare."

A reviewer for The Skeptical Audiophile stated: "If you love hearing INTO a recording, actually being able to 'see' the performers, and feeling as if you are sitting in the studio with Shank, this is the record for you. It's what vintage all analog recordings are known for — this sound."

== Track listing ==
All compositions by Michel Legrand, except as indicated

1. "The Windmills of Your Mind" (Legrand, Alan Bergman, Marilyn Bergman) - 3:09
2. "Watch What Happens" (Legrand, Norman Gimbel) - 4:01
3. "Theme d'Elise" - 3:44
4. "One Day" (Legrand, Bergman, Bergman) - 4:56
5. "Chanson de Solange" (Legrand, Jacques Demy) - 2:52
6. "De Delphine a Lancien" (Legrand, Demy) - 3:16
7. "I Will Wait for You" (Legrand, Gimbel) - 3:27
8. "His Eyes, Her Eyes" (Legrand, Bergman, Bergman) - 4:22
9. "Once Upon a Summertime" (Legrand, Johnny Mercer, Eddie Barclay Eddy Marnay) - 3:28
10. "Chanson des Jumelles" (Legrand, Demy) - 1:52

== Personnel ==
- Bud Shank - alto saxophone, flute
- Gary Barone, Bud Brisbois, Conte Candoli - trumpet
- Billy Byers - trombone
- Ernie Watts - tenor saxophone
- Michel Legrand - piano, harpsichord, arranger
- Artie Kane - electronic organ
- Howard Roberts - guitar
- Ray Brown - double bass
- Shelly Manne - drums
