= John Campbell at Maybeck =

Live album by John Campbell
- Recorded: May 1993
- Venue: Maybeck Recital Hall, Berkeley, California
- Genre: Jazz
- Label: Concord

John Campbell at Maybeck: Maybeck Recital Hall Series Volume 29 is an album of solo performances by jazz pianist John Campbell.

== Music and recording ==
The album was recorded at the Maybeck Recital Hall in Berkeley, California in May 1993. The eight tracks are performances of standards.

== Release and reception ==
Professional ratings
Review scores
| Source | Rating |
|---|---|
| AllMusic | 4/5 stars |
| The Penguin Guide to Jazz | 3.5/4 stars |

The Penguin Guide to Jazz commented on Campbell's "tough but sophisticated bop playing". The AllMusic reviewer suggested that the pianist overused key changes.

== Track listing ==
1. "Just Friends"
2. "Invitation"
3. "Emily"
4. "Darn That Dream"
5. "You and the Night and the Music"
6. "Easy to Love"
7. "I Wish I Knew"
8. "The Touch of Your Lips"

== Personnel ==
- John Campbell – piano
