= Let It Be (Bud Shank album) =

Studio album by Bud Shank with the Bob Aclivar Singers
- Released: March 1970
- Recorded: 1970; Los Angeles, CA
- Genre: Jazz
- Label: Pacific Jazz; ST-20170
- Producer: Richard Bock

Bud Shank chronology
Windmills of Your Mind (1969)	Let It Be (1970)	Sunshine Express (1976)

Let It Be is an album by the saxophonist Bud Shank recorded in 1970 for the Pacific Jazz label.

== Reception ==
Professional ratings
Review scores
Source	Rating
AllMusic	3/5 stars

AllMusic rated the album with 3 stars.

== Track listing ==
1. "Let It Be" (John Lennon, Paul McCartney) - 3:55
2. "Games People Play" (Joe South) - 4:43
3. "Something" (George Harrison) - 2:59
4. "Long Time Gone" (Tex Ritter, Frank Harford) - 3:37
5. "Both Sides Now" (Joni Mitchell) - 3:00
6. "Love's Been Good to Me" (Jimmy Peppers) - 3:54
7. "A Famous Myth" (Jeffrey Comanor) - 4:04
8. "Didn't We?" (Jimmy Webb) - 2:40
9. "The Long and Winding Road" (Lennon, McCartney) - 2:45
10. "For Once in My Life" (Ron Miller, Orlando Murden) - 3:10

== Personnel ==
- Bud Shank - alto saxophone
- Roger Kellaway - piano
- Dennis Budimir - guitar
- Carol Kaye - electric bass
- John Guerin - drums
- The Bob Alcivar Singers arranged and conducted by Bob Alcivar
