= Live at Maybeck Recital Hall, Volume Six =

Live album by Hal Galper
- Released: 1990
- Recorded: July 1990
- Venues: Maybeck Recital Hall, Berkeley, California, U.S.
- Genre: Jazz
- Label: Concord

Live at Maybeck Recital Hall, Volume Six is an album of solo performances by jazz pianist Hal Galper, recorded in 1990.

== Music and recording ==
The album was recorded in July 1990 at the Maybeck Recital Hall in Berkeley, California. Galper commented that, "I was approaching it with a perfectionist attitude, like I had to have everything worked out. And I was getting more and more uptight about it. So I threw all my plans out the window! I went in with 20 or 25 songs that I had sort of done things on, and I winged it!"

== Release and reception ==
Professional ratings
Review scores
Source	Rating
AllMusic	3/5 stars
The Penguin Guide to Jazz	2.5/4 stars

Live at Maybeck Recital Hall, Volume Six was released by Concord Records. The AllMusic reviewer commented that "Galper goes about each task armed with a keen rhythmic sense and a fount of harmonic knowledge." The Penguin Guide to Jazz concluded that "Galper's touch is exact; the ideas come unimpeded but rarely glibly. There is, though, a lack of any real drama, and the set doesn't repay repeated listening."

== Track listing ==
1. "Spoken Introduction"
2. "Whisper Not"
3. "It Never Was You"
4. "All God's Chillun Got Rhythm"
5. "A Kiss to Build a Dream On"
6. "Willow Weep for Me"
7. "The Touch of Your Lips"
8. "Bemsha Swing"
9. "Detour Ahead"
10. "Airegin"

== Personnel ==
- Hal Galper – piano
