= Ted Rosenthal =

American jazz musician

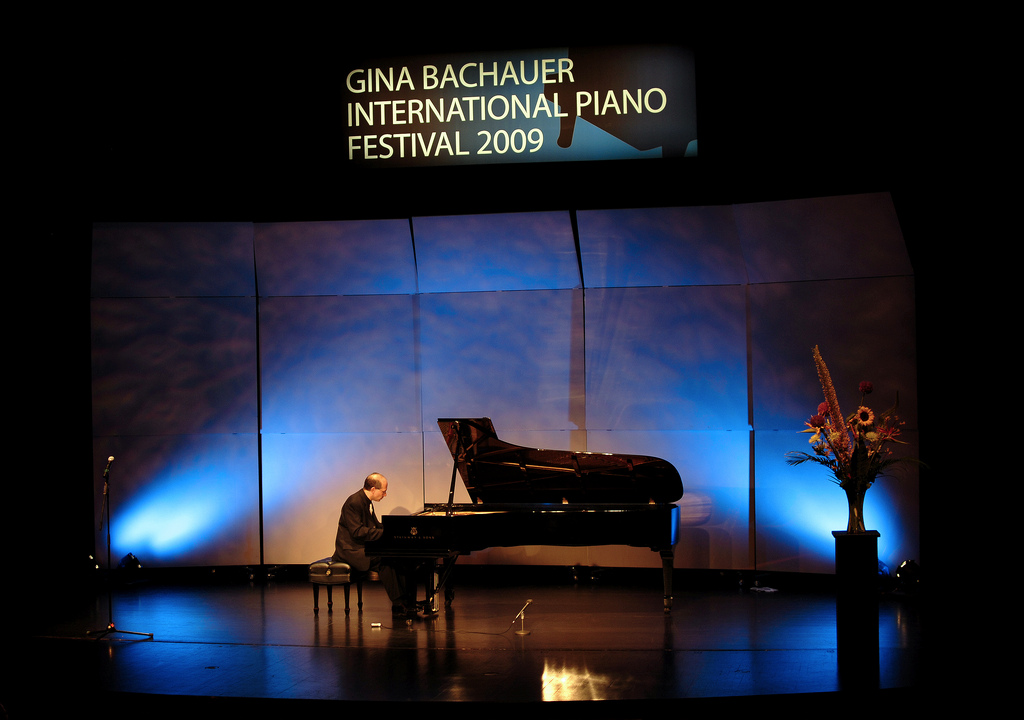
Ted Rosenthal performing at the 2009 Gina Bachauer International Piano Festival

Ted Rosenthal (born 1959) is an American jazz pianist. He was featured on David Sanborn's series Night Music, and has performed worldwide, both as a leader and as a sideman with many jazz greats, including Gerry Mulligan, Art Farmer, Phil Woods, Bob Brookmeyer, and Jon Faddis. Rosenthal has released 15 CDs as a leader, which include Great American Songbook standards, jazz classical compositions, and Rosenthal's own original compositions. In addition to his career as a performing artist, Rosenthal holds faculty positions at the Juilliard School, Manhattan School of Music, and The New School.

== Early life ==
Rosenthal was born and raised in Great Neck, Long Island, New York. He began playing by ear at a young age, and started studying at 12 with Tony Aless, a sideman with Charlie Parker and Stan Getz. In high school, he studied briefly with Jaki Byard and Lennie Tristano, and attended workshops with Billy Taylor, Woody Shaw and others.

Although jazz was Rosenthal's main passion, at the time there were limited opportunities to study jazz at the conservatory level. Since he also found satisfaction and joy in classical music, he pursued classical piano studies at Manhattan School of Music. He received bachelor's and master's degrees in piano performance while continuing to pursue his love of jazz outside the classroom. After college, he continued his classical piano studies with Phillip Kawin while playing jazz in and around New York.

== Later life and career ==
Rosenthal was the winner of the Thelonious Monk International Jazz Competition in 1988, which launched his career as a solo artist, leading to the release of his first CD as a leader New Tunes, New Traditions. The album features Ron Carter, Billy Higgins and Tom Harrell and features a mix of compositions by Thelonious Monk and Rosenthal.

Rosenthal toured in the early 1990s with the last Gerry Mulligan Quartet, recording three CDs with Mulligan and performed in major jazz festivals throughout the world. Jazz critic Gene Lees wrote in his Jazz Letter publication that "the rapport of the group was amazing, particularly Gerry's telepathic communication with outstanding pianist Ted Rosenthal....The byplay with Rosenthal left me with my jaw hanging down". After Mulligan's death, Rosenthal became musical director of The Gerry Mulligan All Star Tribute Band, featuring Lee Konitz, Bob Brookmeyer and Randy Brecker. The group's CD, Thank You, Gerry!, was nominated for a Grammy award in 1998.

As a sideman, Rosenthal has performed in small groups led by Art Farmer, Jon Faddis, Phil Woods, and Jay Leonhart. He has also performed with Wynton Marsalis and the Lincoln Center Jazz Orchestra, the Carnegie Hall Jazz Band, the Westchester Jazz Orchestra and the Vanguard Jazz Orchestra. Rosenthal is the pianist of choice for many top jazz vocalists including Helen Merrill, Mark Murphy and Ann Hampton Callaway. He accompanied the latter one in various editions of the annual Jazz Cruise, supported by Martin Wind (b) and Tim Horner (dr). Serving on the faculty at both the Juilliard School and Manhattan School of Music in New York City, he is also a member of the Juilliard Jazz Quintet.

Rosenthals's CDs as a leader showcase both his creative approach to standards and classics as well as his original compositions. His latest, The King and I (2006), features Rosenthal's jazz takes (with George Mraz on bass, Lewis Nash on drums) on songs from the classic musical. One Night in Vermont (2004), a duo performance with trombonist Bob Brookmeyer, explores great American standards in an inventive and improvisatory style.

Rosenthal regularly performs in jazz piano concerts, including at the 92nd Street Y with Bill Charlap and Dick Hyman. At the 2003 JVC Jazz Festival, he performed in, and co-produced with George Wein, "Piano Starts Here", also featuring Kenny Barron and Cedar Walton. Rosenthal has also appeared on Marian McPartland's Piano Jazz on National Public Radio and on NBC's Night Music with David Sanborn.

Rosenthal composes large-scale works as well as jazz tunes. "The Survivor", a concerto for piano and orchestra that combines written and improvised sections for the soloist, has been performed by Rosenthal with the Rockland Symphony and with the Manhattan Jazz Philharmonic. As an orchestral soloist, he has appeared with the Boston Pops, the Detroit Symphony Orchestra, and many regional American symphony orchestras.

Rosenthal's opera Dear Erich was premiered by the New York City Opera in January 2019 at the Museum of Jewish Heritage. The opera is inspired by more than 200 letters Rosenthal found in his attic. The letters were written by his grandmother to his father in Germany between 1938-1941.

Rosenthal is active in jazz education. He presents jazz clinics throughout the world, often in association with his touring. He was a contributing editor for Piano and Keyboard magazine and has published piano arrangements and feature articles for Piano Today and The Piano Stylist.

== Discography ==
=== As leader ===
- New Tunes, New Traditions (Ken Music, 1990)
- Calling You (CTI, 1992)
- Images of Monk (Jazz Alliance, 1993)
- Ted Rosenthal at Maybeck (Concord Jazz, 1994)
- The Gerry Mulligan Songbook (Chiaroscuro, 1996)
- Rosenthology (Concord Jazz, 1996)
- Threeplay (Playscape, 2001)
- The 3 B's (Playscape, 2002)
- One Night In Vermont (Planet Arts, 2003)
- Expressions (Jazz 'N Pulz, 2004)
- The King and I (Venus, 2006)
- My Funny Valentine (Venus, 2008)
- So In Love (SS Jazz, 2010)
- Impromptu (Playscape, 2010)
- Out Of This World (Playscape, 2011)
- Wonderland (Playscape, 2013)
- Rhapsody In Gershwin (Playscape, 2014)
- My Funny Valentine [reissue] (Venus, 2014)

=== As sideman ===
With Arkadia Jazz All Stars

- Thank You, John! Our Tribute To John Coltrane (1997)
- Thank You, Gerry! Our Tribute To Gerry Mulligan (1998)
