= Monty Alexander at Maybeck =

Live album by Monty Alexander
- Released: 1995
- Recorded: September 20, 1994
- Venue: Maybeck Recital Hall, Berkeley, California
- Genre: Jazz
- Label: Concord

Monty Alexander at Maybeck: Maybeck Recital Hall Series Volume Forty is an album of solo performances by jazz pianist Monty Alexander.

== Music and recording ==
The album was recorded at the Maybeck Recital Hall in Berkeley, California in 1994. The material includes the Alexander original "The Serpent", a "running ostinato blues".

== Release and reception ==
Professional ratings
Review scores
Source	Rating
AllMusic	3/5 stars
The Penguin Guide to Jazz	3.5/4 stars

The AllMusic reviewer wrote that Alexander "remains mostly hidden behind the usual bop-and-standards conventions that have come to dominate these [Maybeck] concerts". The Penguin Guide to Jazz described the album as "a fine, forceful performance that will delight his fans and satisfy anyone putting together a piano library on the strength of this [Maybeck] series".

== Track listing ==
1. "When the Saints Go Marching In"
2. "When I Grow Too Old to Dream"
3. "Close Enough for Love"
4. "The Serpent"
5. "Where Is Love?"
6. "Renewal"
7. "Island in the Sun"
8. "Estaté"
9. "For Sentimental Reasons"
10. "Speak Low"
11. "Smile"

== Personnel ==
- Monty Alexander – piano
