= Ted Rosenthal at Maybeck =

Live album by Ted Rosenthal
- Recorded: October 1994
- Venue: Maybeck Recital Hall, Berkeley, California
- Genre: Jazz
- Label: Concord

Ted Rosenthal at Maybeck: Maybeck Recital Hall Series Volume Thirty-Eight is an album of solo performances by jazz pianist Ted Rosenthal.

== Music and recording ==
The album was recorded at the Maybeck Recital Hall in Berkeley, California in October 1994. The material consists of some standards, two Rosenthal originals, and some pieces associated with other pianists.

== Release and reception ==
Professional ratings
Review scores
Source	Rating
AllMusic	3/5 stars
The Penguin Guide to Jazz	3/4 stars

The AllMusic reviewer wrote: "His technique is immaculate and contrapuntal-minded, the selection of material offbeat, but we don't feel as if we are in the presence of a strong individual personality; one responds with the head and not the heart." The Penguin Guide to Jazz preferred Rosenthal's originals, and suggested that he tended to show off.

== Track listing ==
1. "It's All Right with Me"
2. "Long Ago (and Far Away)"
3. "Lennie's Pennies"
4. "Better You Than Me"
5. "You're a Joy"
6. "Jesu, Joy of Man's Desiring"
7. "Drop Me a Line"
8. "117th Street"
9. "Gone with the Wind"
10. "Hallucinations"
11. "You've Got to Be Modernistic"

== Personnel ==
- Ted Rosenthal – piano
