= Live at Maybeck Recital Hall, Volume Eleven =

Live album by Roger Kellaway
- Recorded: March 1991
- Venue: Maybeck Recital Hall, Berkeley, California, U.S.
- Genre: Jazz
- Label: Concord

Live at Maybeck Recital Hall, Volume Eleven is an album of solo performances by jazz pianist Roger Kellaway, recorded in 1991.

== Music and recording ==
The album was recorded in March 1991 at the Maybeck Recital Hall in Berkeley, California. The material consists of jazz standards and two originals.

== Release and reception ==
Professional ratings
Review scores
Source	Rating
AllMusic	4.5/5 stars
The Penguin Guide to Jazz	3.5/4 stars

Live at Maybeck Recital Hall, Volume Eleven was released by Concord Records. The AllMusic reviewer described it as "one of the most strikingly individual editions of the exhaustive Live at Maybeck series." The Penguin Guide to Jazz suggested that some of the slower tracks were too long, but added that "there is much marvellous pianism here".

== Track listing ==
1. "Introductory Announcement"
2. "How Deep Is the Ocean?"
3. "I'm Still in Love with You"
4. "Love of My Life"
5. "Close Your Eyes"
6. "New Orleans"
7. "My One and Only Love"
8. "Creole Love Call"
9. "I'm Getting Sentimental over You"

== Personnel ==
- Roger Kellaway – piano
