= James Williams at Maybeck =

Live album by James Williams
- Recorded: August 27 1995
- Venue: Maybeck Recital Hall, Berkeley, California
- Genre: Jazz
- Label: Concord

James Williams at Maybeck: Maybeck Recital Hall Series Volume Forty-Two is an album of solo performances by jazz pianist James Williams.

== Music and recording ==
The album was recorded at the Maybeck Recital Hall in Berkeley, California. on August 27 1995. The material is mostly pop and jazz standards.

== Release and reception ==
Professional ratings
Review scores
Source	Rating
AllMusic	2.5/5 stars
Los Angeles Times	3/4 stars

James Williams at Maybeck was released by Concord Records. The AllMusic reviewer concluded: "this CD is a pleasing, often reflective possible capstone to the long Maybeck project". The Los Angeles Times reviewer indicated that solo playing accentuated Williams's style, and concluded that the album was "One of the 10 best in Concord's distinguished Maybeck series". Pianist Liam Noble described the performance of "'Round Midnight": "Williams really hangs on to the mood and, he gives us only one statement of the tune and then out, there’s a world of ideas and originality and, above all, authenticity in what he does in these four short minutes".

== Track listing ==
1. "Polka Dots and Moonbeams" – 8:35
2. "Footprints" – 5:08
3. "Dreamsville" – 7:21
4. "I Fall in Love Too Easily" – 7:44
5. "New York" – 5:51
6. "'Round Midnight" – 4:26
7. "Inner Urge" – 3:15
8. "Street of Dreams" – 4:04
9. "Blues Etude" – 5:11
10. "Spirtual Medley: Holy, Holy, Holy" – 1:25
11. "Spirtual Medley: Sometimes I Feel Like a Motherless Child" – 4:40
12. "Spirtual Medley: Blessed Assurance" – 2:06
13. "Spirtual Medley: Why We Sing" – 4:31

== Personnel ==
- James Williams – piano
