= Ralph Sutton at Maybeck =

Live album by Ralph Sutton
- Recorded: August 1993
- Venue: Maybeck Recital Hall, Berkeley, California
- Genre: Jazz
- Label: Concord

Ralph Sutton at Maybeck: Maybeck Recital Hall Series Volume Thirty is an album of solo performances by jazz pianist Ralph Sutton.

== Music and recording ==
The album was recorded at the Maybeck Recital Hall in Berkeley, California in August 1993. The performances include tributes to Bix Beiderbecke, Willie "The Lion" Smith, and Fats Waller.

== Release and reception ==
Professional ratings
Review scores
Source	Rating
AllMusic	4.5/5 stars
The Penguin Guide to Jazz	3.5/4 stars
The Virgin Encyclopedia of Jazz	3/5 stars

The Penguin Guide to Jazz commented that the piano sound was good, "something that has eluded him many times in the past". The AllMusic reviewer concluded that "This recital is as joyful and as hard-swinging as one would hope."

== Track listing ==
1. "Honeysuckle Rose"
2. "In a Mist"
3. "Clothes Line Ballet"
4. "In the Dark"
5. "Ain't Misbehavin'"
6. "Echoes of Spring"
7. "Dinah"
8. "Love Lies"
9. "Russian Lullaby"
10. "St. Louis Blues"
11. "Viper's Drag"
12. "After You've Gone"

== Personnel ==
- Ralph Sutton – piano
