= The Roger Kellaway Trio =

Studio album by Roger Kellaway
- Released: 1965
- Recorded: May 11–13, 1965; New York City
- Genre: Jazz
- Length: 40:30
- Label: Prestige; PR 7399
- Producer: Lew Futterman

Roger Kellaway chronology
Happiness (1964)	The Roger Kellaway Trio (1965)	Stride! (1966)

The Roger Kellaway Trio is an album by jazz pianist Roger Kellaway recorded for the Prestige label in 1965.

== Reception ==
Professional ratings
Review scores
Source	Rating
AllMusic	4/5 stars
The Penguin Guide to Jazz Recordings	3.5/4 stars

The AllMusic site awarded the album 4 stars stating "the 26-year-old shows off impressive technique, a swinging style, and the willingness to experiment... A frequently intriguing early set by the talented pianist".

== Track listing ==
All compositions by Roger Kellaway except as indicated

1. "Organ Morgan" (Patte Hale) – 2:41
2. "One Night Stand" – 3:08
3. "I'll Follow the Sun" (John Lennon, Paul McCartney) – 6:00
4. "Brats" – 5:40
5. "Can't You See It" (Lee Adams, Charles Strouse) – 2:36
6. "Sweet and Lovely" (Gus Arnheim, Jules LeMare, Harry Tobias) – 3:33
7. "Sigma: O.N." – 4:08
8. "Ballad of the Sad Young Men" (Fran Landesman, Tommy Wolf) – 4:33
9. "No More" (Adams, Strouse) – 2:51
10. "The Fall of Love" (Dimitri Tiomkin, Ned Washington) – 5:20

== Personnel ==
- Roger Kellaway – piano
- Russell George – bass
- Dave Bailey – drums

=== Production ===
- Lew Futterman – producer
