= In My Life (Marian McPartland album) =

Studio album by Marian McPartland
- Released: 1993
- Recorded: 1993
- Genre: Jazz
- Length: 1:02:53
- Label: Concord CCD-4561
- Producer: Carl Jefferson

Marian McPartland chronology
| Marian McPartland: Live at the Maybeck Recital Hall, Volume Nine (1990) | In My Life (1993) | Marian McPartland Plays the Music of Mary Lou Williams (1994) |

In My Life is a 1993 album by jazz pianist Marian McPartland.

== Reception ==
Professional ratings
Review scores
| Source | Rating |
|---|---|
| Allmusic | 4.5/5 stars |
| The Penguin Guide to Jazz Recordings | 4/4 stars |

The album was positively reviewed by Scott Yanow at Allmusic who wrote that "Despite the diverse repertoire, McPartland's own flexible style shines through and her individual musical personality is felt in each song. ...McPartland's closing wistful solo piano version of "Singin' the Blues" (dedicated to her late husband, cornetist Jimmy McPartland) should not be missed". The Penguin Guide to Jazz Recordings included the album in its suggested “core collection” of essential recordings.

== Track listing ==
1. "Grooveyard" (Carl Perkins) – 4:10
2. "In My Life" (John Lennon, Paul McCartney) – 4:28
3. "In the Days of Our Love" (Peggy Lee, Marian McPartland) – 3:47
4. "Red Planet" (John Coltrane) – 5:57
5. "What's New?" (Johnny Burke, Bob Haggart) – 5:01
6. "Gone with the Wind" (Herbert Magidson, Allie Wrubel) – 5:20
7. "Close Your Eyes" (Bernice Petkere) – 3:46
8. "For Dizzy" (McPartland, George Young) – 2:25
9. "Moon and Sand" (William Engvick, Morty Palitz, Alec Wilder) – 5:27
10. "Naima" (John Coltrane) – 8:23
11. "Velas" (Ivan Lins, Vítor Martins) – 5:23
12. "Ramblin'" (Ornette Coleman) – 4:08
13. "Singin' the Blues (Till My Daddy Comes Home)" (Con Conrad, Sam M. Lewis, J. Russel Robinson, Joe Young) – 3:39

== Personnel ==
- Marian McPartland – piano
- Chris Potter - alto saxophone, tenor saxophone
- Gary Mazzaroppi – bass
- Glenn Davis – drums
- Peter Beckerman – assistant engineer
- Elizabeth Bell – production coordination
- Chip Deffaa, Studs Terkel – liner notes
- Phil Edwards – remixing
- George Horn – mastering
- Carl Jefferson – producer
- Kent Judkins – art direction
- A.T. Michael MacDonald – engineer
- Sylvia Rogers – illustrations
