= Live at Maybeck Recital Hall, Volume Nine =

Live album by Marian McPartland
- Released: 1991
- Recorded: 1991 at the Maybeck Recital Hall, Berkeley, California
- Genre: Jazz
- Length: 1:02:53
- Label: Concord CCD-4460
- Producer: Carl Jefferson

Marian McPartland chronology
Marian McPartland Plays the Benny Carter Songbook (1990)	Live at Maybeck Recital Hall, Volume Nine (1991)	In My Life (1993)

Live at Maybeck Recital Hall, Volume Nine is a 1991 live album by jazz pianist Marian McPartland, recorded at the Maybeck Recital Hall in Berkeley, California.

== Reception ==
Professional ratings
Review scores
Source	Rating
Allmusic	4.5/5 stars
The Penguin Guide to Jazz Recordings	3.5/4 stars

The album was positively reviewed by Ken Dryden at Allmusic who wrote that McPartland's "chops are never in question". Dryden highlighted Duke Ellington's "Clothed Woman", writing that "McPartland slowly unveils its shrouds, gliding through a maze of dramatic chords, joyous stride piano and repetitious vamps with a veteran's confidence" and regretted that the concert wasn't filmed "...in order for the rest of us to catch her playfulness at the piano, her head thrown back with laughter, with her witty introductions to each piece (which are unfortunately edited out of the CD)". Dryden concluded that the album "not only ranks with the best of the Maybeck solo series, but it should be considered as one of the best solo concerts ever to be released".

== Track listing ==
1. "This Time the Dream's on Me" (Harold Arlen, Johnny Mercer) – 4:03
2. "A Fine Romance" (Dorothy Fields, Jerome Kern) – 3:12
3. "Willow Weep for Me" (Ann Ronell) – 5:42
4. "Twilight World" (Marian McPartland) – 4:22
5. "Clothed Woman" (Duke Ellington) – 3:32
6. "Prelude to a Kiss" (Ellington, Irving Gordon, Irving Mills) – 5:20
7. "The Duke" (Dave Brubeck) – 4:26
8. "Theme from Piano Jazz" (McPartland) – 2:31
9. "Love You Madly" (Ellington) – 4:34
10. "Easy Living" (Ralph Rainger, Leo Robin) – 4:06
11. "Things Ain't What They Used to Be" (Mercer Ellington) – 3:24
12. "I Should Care" (Sammy Cahn, Axel Stordahl, Paul Weston) – 3:49
13. "My Funny Valentine" (Lorenz Hart, Richard Rodgers) – 5:23
14. "Turnaround" (Ornette Coleman) – 4:13
15. "It's You or No One" (Sammy Cahn, Jule Styne) – 4:13
16. "I'll Be Around" (Alec Wilder) – 4:02

== Personnel ==
- Marian McPartland – piano
- Kent Judkins - art direction
- Leslie Gourse - liner notes
- George Horn - mastering
- James Gudeman - photography, cover photograph
- Ron Davis - assembly, engineer
- Nick Phillips - assistant producer
- Bud Spangler - engineer, remote recording coordinator
- John Burk - production coordination
- Carl Jefferson - producer
