= Live at Maybeck Recital Hall, Volume Fourteen =

Live album by Alan Broadbent
- Released: 1991
- Recorded: May 1991
- Venue: Maybeck Recital Hall, Berkeley, California, U.S.
- Genre: Jazz
- Label: Concord

Live at Maybeck Recital Hall, Volume Fourteen is an album of solo performances by jazz pianist Alan Broadbent, recorded in 1991.

== Music and recording ==
The album was recorded in May 1991 at the Maybeck Recital Hall in Berkeley, California. Three of the 13 pieces are Broadbent originals.

== Release and reception ==
Professional ratings
Review scores
| Source | Rating |
|---|---|
| AllMusic | 4/5 stars |
| The Penguin Guide to Jazz | 4/4 stars |

Live at Maybeck Recital Hall, Volume Fourteen was released by Concord Records. The Penguin Guide to Jazz commented that "Broadbent's internal rhythms are springy enough to keep even his ballads on a simmering heat" and again praised the sound quality of the Maybeck piano recordings.

== Track listing ==
1. "Introduction" – 0:15
2. "I Hear a Rhapsody" – 3:36
3. "Oleo" – 3:02
4. "You've Changed" – 4:45
5. "Lennie's Pennies" – 3:31
6. "Strollin'" – 4:02
7. "Peace" – 4:10
8. "Nardis" – 3:58
9. "Woody 'n' I" – 6:36
10. "Sweet and Lovely" – 4:00
11. "Mendocino Nights" – 5:22
12. "Upper Manhattan Medical Group" – 5:26
13. "Don't Ask Why" – 4:59
14. "Parisian Thoroughfare" – 3:45

== Personnel ==
- Alan Broadbent – piano
