= Mike Holober =

American jazz pianist, composer, and educator

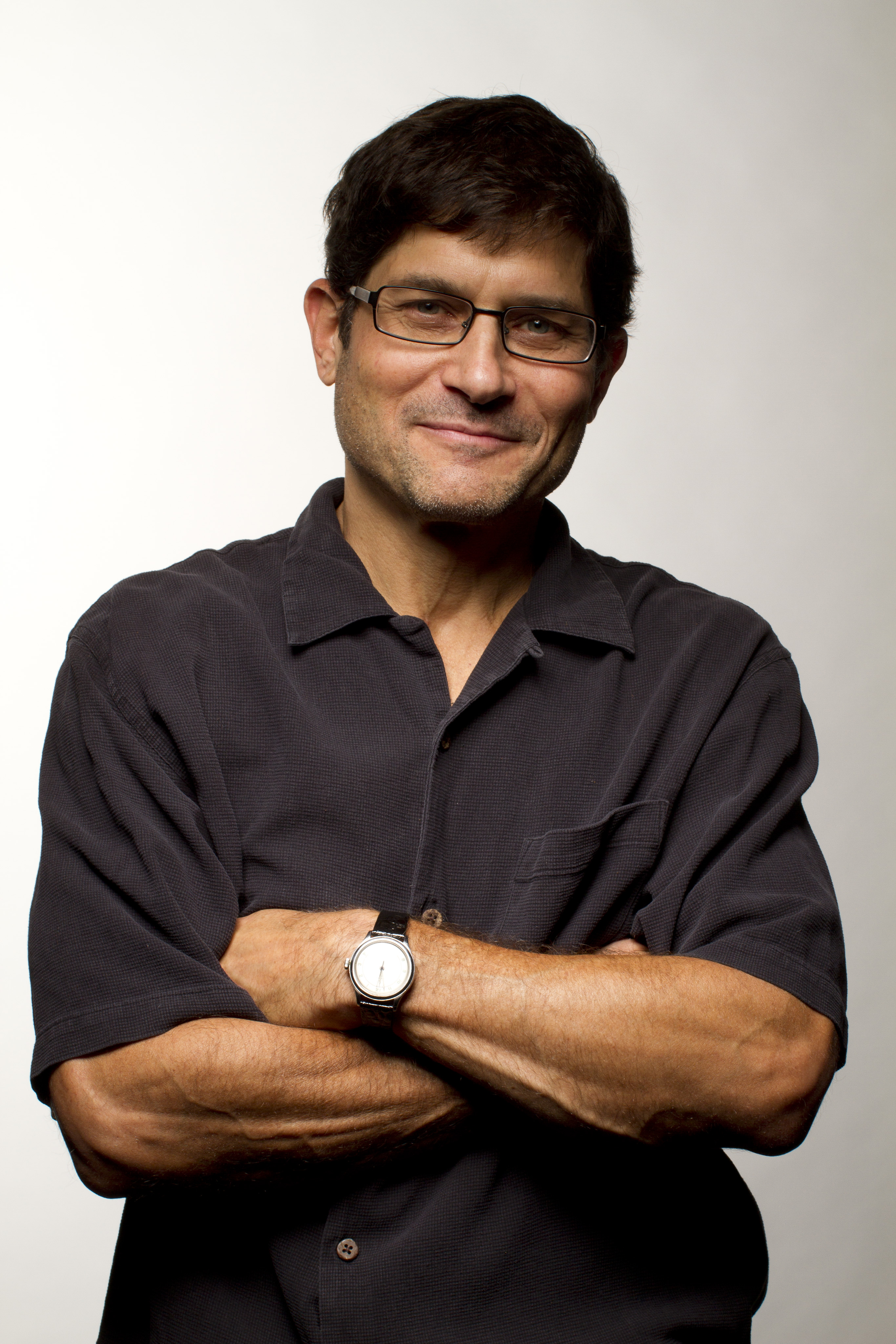
Mike Holober, pianist, composer, arranger. Photo by Darryl Estrine.

Mike Holober (born April 21, 1957) is an American jazz pianist, composer, arranger, and educator.

Holober moved to New York in 1986, and worked as a composer and sideman pianist. After working with baritone saxophonist Nick Brignola in the late 1990s, he formed The Mike Holober Quintet, featuring original compositions and arrangements performed by Tim Ries (saxophone), Wolfgang Muthspiel (guitar), Brian Blade (drums), and Scott Colley and John Patitucci (bass). The quintet recorded two albums on Sons of Sound: Canyon (2003) and Wish List(2006).

Holober's big band, The Gotham Jazz Orchestra, released two recordings: thought Trains (Sons of Sound, 2004) and Quake (Sunnyside, 2009). The group's most recent recording, Hiding Out, is due for release August 2019 on ZOHO. The double CD features Hiding Out, commissioned for by The Philadelphia Museum of Art (funded by the Pew Foundation), Flow, commissioned by the Westchester Jazz Orchestra (funded by a NYSCA Individual Artist's Grant), and Jumble, commissioned by The U.S. Army Jazz Knights of West Point. The recording also includes an arrangement of Jobim's Caminhos Cruzados, commissioned by the Westchester Jazz Orchestra and written for and featuring trumpet master Marvin Stamm. Other featured artists on Hiding Out include Billy Drewes, Jason Rigby, Scott Wendholt, Adam Kolker, Jon Gordon, Steve Cardenas, and Jesse Lewis.

Holober is a 2017-18 recipient of a Chamber Music America New Jazz Works Grant for Don't Let Go, a song-cycle in the tradition of Robert Schumann, Samuel Barber, and Ralph Vaughan Williams, and premiered at Symphony Space (The Leonard Nimoy Thalia) in June 2018. Don't Let Go was written for Holober's octet Balancing Act, whose premiere recording Balancing Act was released in 2015 (Palmetto), featuring Mike's original compositions (several with lyrics), performed by Kate McGarry, Dick Oatts, Jason Rigby, Marvin Stamm, Mark Patterson, John Hebert, and Brian Blade.

Holober was the musical director of the Westchester Jazz Orchestra from 2007 to 2013, a non-profit organization based in Westchester New York. Under his leadership, the organization commissioned over 140 new works for jazz orchestra. Guest artists included Joe Lovano, Kate McGarry, Janis Siegal, John Scofield, John Patitucci, Randy Brecker, and Paquito D'Rivera. Holober also served as conductor, artistic director, and lead arranger for WJO's 2011 release, Maiden Voyage Suite, a reworking of Herbie Hancock's 1965 Blue Note recording.

Holober has worked with several big bands in Europe, including the HR-Bigband (Frankfurt), where he served as Associate Guest Conductor from 2011 to 2015, and the WDR Big Band (Cologne). Projects for the HR Big Band include arranging and conducting concert length projects for Kurt Rosenwinkel, Billy Cobham, Jane Monheit, Terje Rypdal, Dr. Lonnie Smith, Miguel Zenon, and Jazz From Hell, a concert of the works of Frank Zappa for the 2015 Frankfurt Jazz festival. With the WDR Big Band (WestDeutsche Rundfunk - Cologne, Germany) he has written and conducted projects for Avishai Cohen and Eli Degibri, and for drummer Al Foster. Other projects include arrangements for a concert featuring Eli Degibri with jazz orchestra and strings, which was performed at the National Opera House in Tel Aviv in 2014.

Holober is a full professor at The City College of New York and was named the inaugural Stuart Z. Katz Professor of Humanities and the Arts in 2018. He is a five-time MacDowell Fellow, Ucross Foundation Fellow and Yaddo Guest. He also teaches composing and arranging at The Manhattan School of Music. From 2007 - 2015 he served as associate director of the BMI Jazz Composer's Workshop, where he taught with musical director Jim McNeely.

== Discography ==
- The Mike Holober Quintet, Canyon (Sons of Sound, 2003)
- The Gotham Jazz Orchestra, Thought Trains (Sons of Sound, 2004)
- The Mike Holober Quintet, Wish List (Sons of Sound, 2006)
- The Gotham Jazz Orchestra, Quake (Sunnyside, 2009)
- Mike Holober & Balancing Act, Balancing Act (Palmetto, 2015)
- The Gotham Jazz Orchestra, Hiding Out (Zoho Music, 2019)
