= Jaki Byard at Maybeck =

Live album by Jaki Byard
- Released: 1992
- Recorded: September 8, 1991
- Venue: Maybeck Recital Hall, Berkeley, California
- Genre: Jazz
- Label: Concord

Jaki Byard at Maybeck: Maybeck Recital Hall Series Volume Seventeen is an album of solo performances by jazz pianist Jaki Byard.

== Music and recording ==
The album was recorded at the Maybeck Recital Hall in Berkeley, California in 1991. Byard played in a variety of styles: "It's all here, the lyrical and the rollicking, the finely-tuned comic flair and roving, impish imagination filtered through a bedrock sense of swing and surpassing technical command".

== Release and reception ==
Professional ratings
Review scores
Source	Rating
AllMusic	4/5 stars
The Penguin Guide to Jazz	3.5/4 stars

It was released by Concord Records in 1991. The AllMusic reviewer concluded that this was "an excellent outing" by "one of the most underrated jazz pianists of all time".

== Track listing ==
1. "Hello, Young Lovers" – 7:12
2. "Tribute to the Ticklers" – 5:27
3. "My One and Only Love" – 7:28
4. "European Episode" – 11:01
5. "Collage of Thelonions Monk" – 7:40
6. "'Round Midnight/Friday the Thirteenth/Ruby My Dear" – 2:22
7. "Dedication to Art Blakey, Walter Davis, Leonard Bernstein and Aaron" – 14:37

== Personnel ==
- Jaki Byard – piano
