= Westchester Jazz Orchestra =

American concert jazz orchestra

- Origin: Westchester, New York
- Genres: Jazz, big band
- Years active: 2002–present
- Label: WJO Productions
- Members: Mike Holober, Artistic Director and Conductor; Jay Brandford, Lead Alto Saxophone; David Brandom, Alto Saxophone; Ralph Lalama, Tenor Saxophone; Jason Rigby, Tenor Saxophone; Ed Xiques, Baritone Saxophone; Tony Kadleck, Lead Trumpet; Craig Johnson, Trumpet; Scott Wendholt, Trumpet; Marvin Stamm, Trumpet; Larry Dean Farrell, Trombone; Keith O'Quinn, Trombone; Bruce Eidem, Trombone; George Flynn, Bass Trombone; Ted Rosenthal, Piano; Harvie S, Bass; Andy Watson, Drums; Emily Tabin, Executive Director
- Website: www.artswestchester.org/profile/westjazzorch/

The Westchester Jazz Orchestra is a 16 piece concert jazz orchestra based in Westchester, New York currently conducted by jazz pianist and composer Mike Holober. The orchestra has been critically acclaimed by The New York Times, Down Beat, and JazzTimes. The Westchester Jazz Orchestra was honored as a runner up for "Best Big Band" in the 2011 JazzTimes readers' poll. The ensemble operates as a non-profit artistic entity based in the Westchester County region of New York.

Co-founded in 2002 by saxophonist Joey Berkley, guitarist Peter Hand (who left the group during its initial season), and Executive Director Emily Tabin, the ensemble has been directed by pianist Mike Holober since 2007. WJO musicians are world-class as are the composers and arrangers from whom they commission music. They primarily use the talents of their own members for new, original music. Their first album, "All In," was released in 2007 under their own label, WJO Productions, and their second, "Maiden Voyage Suite," in 2010.

WJO features studio musicians in the New York City region and has performed numerous concerts that include artistic collaborations with performers, composers and arrangers such as Alan Broadbent, Janis Siegel, Pete McGuinness, Kenny Berger, Joe Lovano, Jack Cooper, Randy Brecker, John Scofield and Paquito D'Rivera.

== Discography/DVD ==
- 2007 All In (WJO Productions)
- 2011 Maiden Voyage Suite (WJO Productions)

== See also ==
- Mike Holober
- Marvin Stamm
