= Live at Maybeck Recital Hall, Volume Eight =

Live album by Gerald Wiggins
- Recorded: August 1990
- Venue: Maybeck Recital Hall, Berkeley, California, U.S.
- Genre: Jazz
- Label: Concord

Live at Maybeck Recital Hall, Volume Eight is an album of solo performances by jazz pianist Gerald Wiggins, recorded in 1990.

== Music and recording ==
The album was recorded in August 1990 at the Maybeck Recital Hall in Berkeley, California. The material is mostly jazz standards.

== Release and reception ==
Professional ratings
Review scores
Source	Rating
AllMusic	4.5/5 stars
The Penguin Guide to Jazz	3.5/4 stars

Live at Maybeck Recital Hall, Volume Eight was released by Concord Records. The AllMusic reviewer commented that "No matter how familiar the standard, [...] Wiggins finds a fresh approach while retaining the lyrical essence of each piece." The Penguin Guide to Jazz described it in 1992 as "arguably his best-ever record". A reviewer for CD Review Digest called Wiggins "one of the most schooled and versatile pianists playing jazz today," and wrote: "His ballads are beautiful, his swingers swing, and his treatment of standards is so refreshing that you might almost be hearing them for the first time." Bill Kohlhaase of the Los Angeles Times stated that "There's a bit of Art Tatum to be heard" on the album," and noted that Wiggins "brings some of the same strolling rhythms, a rich harmonic sense and the kind of playful, inventive embellishments to his standard treatments that Tatum... brought to his music."

== Track listing ==
1. "Yesterdays"
2. "My Ship"
3. "All the Things You Are"
4. "Night Mist Blues"
5. "Body and Soul"
6. "Easy to Love"
7. "You're Mine You"
8. "I Should Care"
9. "Don't Blame Me"
10. "Take the 'A' Train"
11. "Berkeley Blues"
12. "Lullaby of the Leaves"

== Personnel ==
- Gerald Wiggins – piano
