= Bill Mays at Maybeck =

Live album by Bill Mays
- Recorded: September 1992
- Venue: Maybeck Recital Hall, Berkeley, California
- Genre: Jazz
- Label: Concord
- Producer: Carl Jefferson

Bill Mays at Maybeck: Maybeck Recital Hall Series Volume Twenty-Six is an album of solo performances by jazz pianist Bill Mays.

== Music and recording ==
The album was recorded at the Maybeck Recital Hall in Berkeley, California in September 1992. Most of the material is swing standards.

== Release and reception ==
Professional ratings
Review scores
Source	Rating
AllMusic	4.5/5 stars
The Penguin Guide to Jazz	3/4 stars

The AllMusic reviewer recommended one track in particular: "'A Nightingale Sang in Berkeley Square' (which starts and ends with a very impressionistic fantasy, making one wonder if its swinging middle section was indeed a dream) is most memorable". The Penguin Guide to Jazz wrote that the standards were played with imagination, but that some of the other tracks were lacking expression.

== Track listing ==
No.	Title	Writer(s)	Length
1.	"A Nightingale Sang in Berkeley Square"	Eric Maschwitz, Manning Sherwin	7:30
2.	"I Wish I Knew"	Mack Gordon, Harry Warren	4:58
3.	"Stompin' at the Savoy"	Benny Goodman, Andy Razaf, Edgar Sampson, Chick Webb	5:31
4.	"Boardwalk Blues"	Bill Mays	6:22
5.	"Lush Life"	Billy Strayhorn	6:09
6.	"I'm Confessin' (That I Love You)"	Doc Daugherty, Al J. Neiburg, Ellis Reynolds	4:22
7.	"Guess I'll Hang My Tears Out to Dry"	Sammy Cahn, Jule Styne	7:08
8.	"Jitterbug Waltz"	Richard Maltby, Jr., Fats Waller	6:21
9.	"Thanksgiving Prayer"	Mays	5:19
10.	"Why Did I Choose You?/Never Let Me Go"	Michael Leonard, Herbert Martin	5:22
11.	"Grandpa's Spells"	Jelly Roll Morton	1:46

== Personnel ==
- Bill Mays – piano
