= Gerald Wiggins =

American pianist (1922-2008)

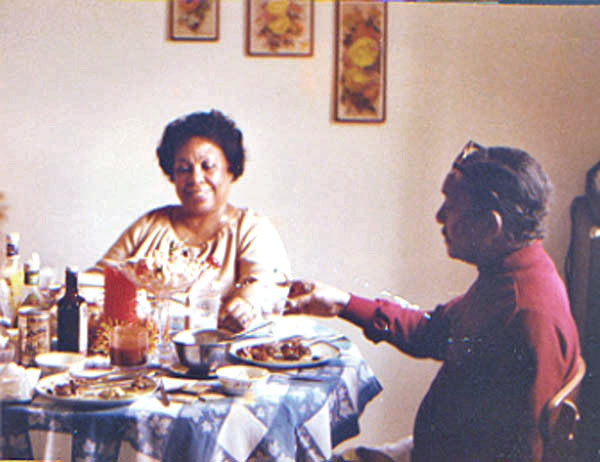
- Helen Humes and Wiggins at the Village Jazz Lounge in Walt Disney World

Background information
- Born: Gerald Foster Wiggins; May 12, 1922; New York City, New York, U.S.
- Died: July 13, 2008 (aged 86) Encino, California, U.S.
- Genres: Jazz
- Occupations: Musician, composer, arranger
- Instruments: Piano, organ

Gerald Foster Wiggins (May 12, 1922 – July 13, 2008) was an American jazz pianist and organist.

== Early life ==
Wiggins was born in New York City on May 12, 1922. He studied classical music, but switched to jazz in his teens.

== Later life and career ==
Wiggins began as a professional career as a musician accompanying comedian Stepin Fetchit. Wiggins worked with Louis Armstrong and Benny Carter. He was in the military from 1944 to 1946. In the 1940s, he moved to Los Angeles, where he played music for television and film. He also worked with singers like Lena Horne (1950–51), Kay Starr, and Eartha Kitt. In 1960, his best recording as a pianist appeared, Wiggin' Out, known for the quality of its music and fresh, clear sound. He recorded another LP at the organ with saxophonist Teddy Edwards. "In the 1960s he worked as a music director and vocal coach in film studios," including "a lengthy stint as vocal coach for Marilyn Monroe." In the 1970s he often collaborated with vocalist Helen Humes.

Wiggins was known for his trio with Andy Simpkins and Paul Humphrey, among others. He also appeared in an episode of 227, and an episode of Moesha, in both cases he played a pianist. "He appeared regularly at American jazz parties and festivals and occasionally at Japanese and European festivals and was in demand for recording sessions." Late in his career, Wiggins recorded for Concord Records which according to The New Grove Dictionary of Jazz "demonstrate his firm touch, all-round musicianship, and sense of swing."

== Personal life and death ==
Wiggins was married to Lynn Wiggins from 1987 until his death. He had two children, three step-children, and several grandchildren, and died in Los Angeles on July 13, 2008, at the age of 86.

== Selected discography ==
=== As leader/co-leader ===
- Wiggin' with Wig (Dig, 1956)
- Relax and Enjoy It! (Contemporary, 1956)
- Collections with Red Norvo, Art Pepper and Joe Morello (Intro, 1957)
- Reminiscin' with Wig (Motif, 1957)
- The King and I (Challenge, 1957)
- The Gerald Wiggins Trio (Tampa, 1958)
- The Loveliness of You... (Tampa, 1958)
- Music from "Around the World in 80 days" in Modern Jazz (Specialty, 1958)
- Wiggin' out (Hi-Fi Jazz, 1960) – as organist
- Memory Lane (Ava, 1964)
- Wig is here (Black and Blue, 1977)
- A beautiful friendship (Black and Blue, 1977)
- Live at Maybeck Recital Hall, Volume Eight (Concord, 1990)
- Soulidarity (Concord, 1995)
- Gerry Wiggins and friends (Madwig Music, 2002)

=== As sideman ===
With Mel Brown

- Chicken Fat (Impulse!, 1967)

With Red Callender

- The Lowest (MetroJazz, 1958)

With Benny Carter

- Aspects (United Artists, 1959)

With Buddy Collette

- Tanganyika (Dig, 1956)
- Man of Many Parts (Contemporary, 1956)
- Everybody's Buddy (Challenge, 1957)
- Porgy & Bess (Interlude 1957 [1959])

With Harry Edison

- "Sweets" for the Sweet (Sue, 1964)
- Sweets for the Sweet Taste of Love (Vee-Jay, 1964)

With Teddy Edwards

- Heart & Soul (as organist) (Contemporary, 1962)

With Tal Farlow

- Autumn In New York (Norgran 1954)

With Paul Horn

- House of Horn (Dot, 1957)

With Illinois Jacquet

- Illinois Jacquet and His Orchestra (Verve, 1956)

With Cal Tjader

- Cal Tjader Quartet (Fantasy, 1956)

With Gerald Wilson

- Jessica (Trend, 1983)
