= Dave McKenna =

American jazz pianist

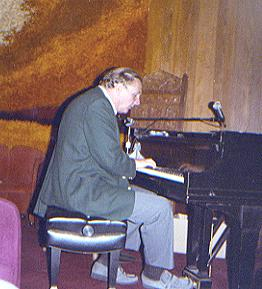
- Jazz pianist Dave McKenna at the Village Jazz Lounge in Walt Disney World

Background information
- Born: May 30, 1930; Woonsocket, Rhode Island, U.S.
- Died: October 18, 2008 (aged 78) State College, Pennsylvania, U.S.
- Genres: Jazz, swing
- Occupation: Musician
- Instrument: Piano
- Years active: 1940s–1990s
- Labels: Epic, Bethlehem, Inner City, Chiaroscuro, Concord

Dave McKenna (May 30, 1930 – October 18, 2008) was an American jazz pianist known primarily as a solo pianist and for his "three-handed" swing style. He was a significant figure in the evolution of jazz piano.

== Career ==
He was born in Woonsocket, Rhode Island, United States. At age 15, McKenna worked in big bands with Charlie Ventura (1949) and Woody Herman's Orchestra (1950–51). He then spent two years in the military, in the Korea War, before returning to Ventura (1953–54). During his career he worked in swing and dixieland settings with Al Cohn, Eddie Condon, Stan Getz, Gene Krupa, Zoot Sims, Joe Venuti, and often with Bob Wilber and Bobby Hackett. McKenna released his first solo album in 1955. During the 1980s, he worked as a pianist at the Copley Plaza Hotel in Boston.

== Recordings ==
McKenna recorded extensively from 1958–2002, beginning with ABC-Paramount (1956), Epic (1958), Bethlehem (1960) and Realm (1963). He made several recordings for Chiaroscuro in the 1970s, including his comeback album Solo Piano. He debuted with the Concord Jazz label in 1979, for whom he recorded many albums as both a soloist and group member. He was featured in the second volume of Concord's 42-disc series recorded live at Maybeck Recital Hall. His last recording, An Intimate Evening with Dave McKenna was released by Arbors in 2002.

== Musical style ==
McKenna's musical style relied on two key elements relating to his choices of tunes and set selection, and the method of playing that has come to be known as "three-handed swing".

His renditions usually began with a spare, open statement of the melody; or, on ballads, a freely played, richly harmonized one. He then often stated the theme a second time, gradually bringing in more harmony or a stronger pulse.

His improvisation then began in earnest on three simultaneous levels: a walking bassline, mid-range chords, and an improvised melody. The bassline, for which McKenna frequently employed the rarely used lowest regions of the piano, was often played non-legato to simulate a double bassist's phrasing. The chords were played with the thumb and forefinger of the right hand or of both hands combined, if the bass was not too low to make the stretch unfeasible. Sometimes he also added a guide-tone line consisting of thirds and sevenths on top of the bass, played by the thumb of the left hand. With his right hand's remaining fingers, he then played the melody, weaving it into improvised lines featuring colorful chromaticism, blues licks and mainstream-jazz ideas. The result was the sound of a three-piece band under one person's creative control.

McKenna often used his left hand to emulate the sound of a rhythm jazz guitarist, playing a four-to-the-bar "strum" consisting of a bass note (root/fifth/other interval), third and seventh. This pattern often took the form of intervals of a tenth, which is why the voicings were frequently "broken" arpeggiated, with the top two notes being played on the beat and the bass note slightly before. He often subtly altered these voicings every two beats for variety.

His "broken tenth" sound was frequently mistaken for stride piano. However, it was a more modern four-beat style, as opposed to stride's two-beat "oom-pah" rhythm (a la Fats Waller). McKenna was also quite capable of playing full stride piano, and occasionally broke into stride choruses, especially on songs associated with traditional jazz or at the height of an up-tempo song's development.

The characteristic that perhaps most distinguishes McKenna's playing is his sense of time. One of the biggest challenges of solo jazz piano is the need to provide a compelling time feel, in part by emulating the rhythmic landscape normally provided by three or four players in a small group. By conceiving multiple "parts" and playing them with distinct volume levels and time feels (often with right hand chords ahead of the beat and the melody behind the beat), McKenna had a unique ability to reproduce, on his own, the sound of a small group.

McKenna liked to create medleys around a common word or theme in song titles. He often combined ballads and up-tempo songs with standards, pop tunes, blues, and TV themes and folk songs.

== Death ==
McKenna died on October 18, 2008, in State College, Pennsylvania at the age of 78 from lung cancer.

== Partial discography ==
=== As leader ===
- Solo Piano (ABC-Paramount, 1956)
- The Piano Scene of Dave McKenna (Epic, 1959)
- Solo Piano (Chiaroscuro, 1973)
- Cookin' at Michael's Pub (Halcyon, 1973)
- Dave "Fingers" McKenna (Chiaroscuro, 1977)
- No Bass Hit (Concord Jazz, 1979)
- Giant Strides (Concord Jazz, 1979)
- Piano Mover (Concord Jazz, 1981)
- Bill Evans: A Tribute (Palo Alto, 1982)
- A Celebration of Hoagy Carmichael (Concord Jazz, 1983)
- Dancing in the Dark and Other Music of Arthur Schwartz (Concord Jazz, 1986)
- My Friend the Piano (Concord Jazz, 1987)
- No More Ouzo for Puzo (Concord Jazz, 1989)
- Live at Maybeck Recital Hall, Volume Two (Concord Jazz, 1989)
- Christmas Ivory (Concord Jazz, 1997)
- An Intimate Evening With Dave McKenna (Arbors, 2002)

=== As sideman ===
With Ed Bickert

- Bye Bye Baby (Concord, 1984)

With Urbie Green

- Blues and Other Shades of Green (ABC-Paramount, 1955)
- All About Urbie Green and His Big Band (ABC-Paramount, 1956)

With Bobby Hackett

- Creole Cookin' (Verve, 1967)

With Teddi King

- This is New (1977)

With Zoot Sims

- From A to...Z (RCA Victor, 1956), The Al Cohn/Zoot Sims Sextet
- Down Home (Bethlehem, 1960)
