= John Campbell (jazz pianist) =

American jazz pianist (born 1955)

John Campbell (born July 7, 1955) is an American jazz pianist.

Campbell was born in Bloomington, Illinois. He studied piano privately as a youth, then attended University High School (Normal) (class of 1973). He briefly attended Illinois State University where he was known nearly as well for his vibes work as for his piano playing. In the 1970s, he moved to Chicago, then to New York City in the 1980s. He has worked with Buddy DeFranco, Terry Gibbs, Stan Getz, Eddie Harris, James Moody, Charles McPherson, Clark Terry, and Mel Tormé. Campbell has recorded as a soloist on John Campbell at Maybeck (Concord Jazz, 1993) and in various trios, such as After Hours (Contemporary, 1988) with bassist Todd Coolman and drummer Gerry Gibbs, and Workin' Out (Criss Cross Jazz, 2001) with bassist Jay Anderson and drummer Billy Drummond.

== Discography ==
=== As leader ===
- After Hours (Contemporary, 1988)
- Turning Point (Contemporary, 1990)
- Technicolours (Maranatha Music, 1991)
- John Campbell at Maybeck (Concord Jazz, 1993)
- Workin' Out (Criss Cross, 2001)

=== As sideman ===
With Clark Terry

- Squeeze Me! (Chiaroscuro, 1989)
- Having Fun (Delos, 1990)
- Carnegie Blues (Squatty Roo, 2015)

With others

- Buddy DeFranco & Terry Gibbs, Holiday for Swing (Contemporary, 1988)
- Greg Gisbert, Harcology (Criss Cross, 1994)
- Greg Gisbert, On Second Thought (Criss Cross, 1994)
- Denise Jannah, I Was Born in Love with You (Blue Note, 1995)
- Jump 'n the Saddle Band, Jump 'n the Saddle Band (Atlantic, 1984)
- Pete Minger, Look to the Sky (Concord Jazz, 1993)
- Terry Gibbs & Buddy DeFranco, Chicago Fire (Contemporary, 1987)
- Terry Gibbs, 92 Years Young (Whaling City Sound, 2017)
- Randy Stonehill, Paradise Sky (Stonehillian Music, 2008)
- Cy Touff & Sandy Mosse, Tickle Toe (Delmark, 2008)
- Mel Torme, Night at the Concord Pavilion (Concord, 1990)
- Mel Torme, Recorded Live at the Fujitsu-Concord Jazz Festival in Japan '90 (Concord Jazz, 1991)
