= Roger Kellaway =

American jazz musician (born 1939)

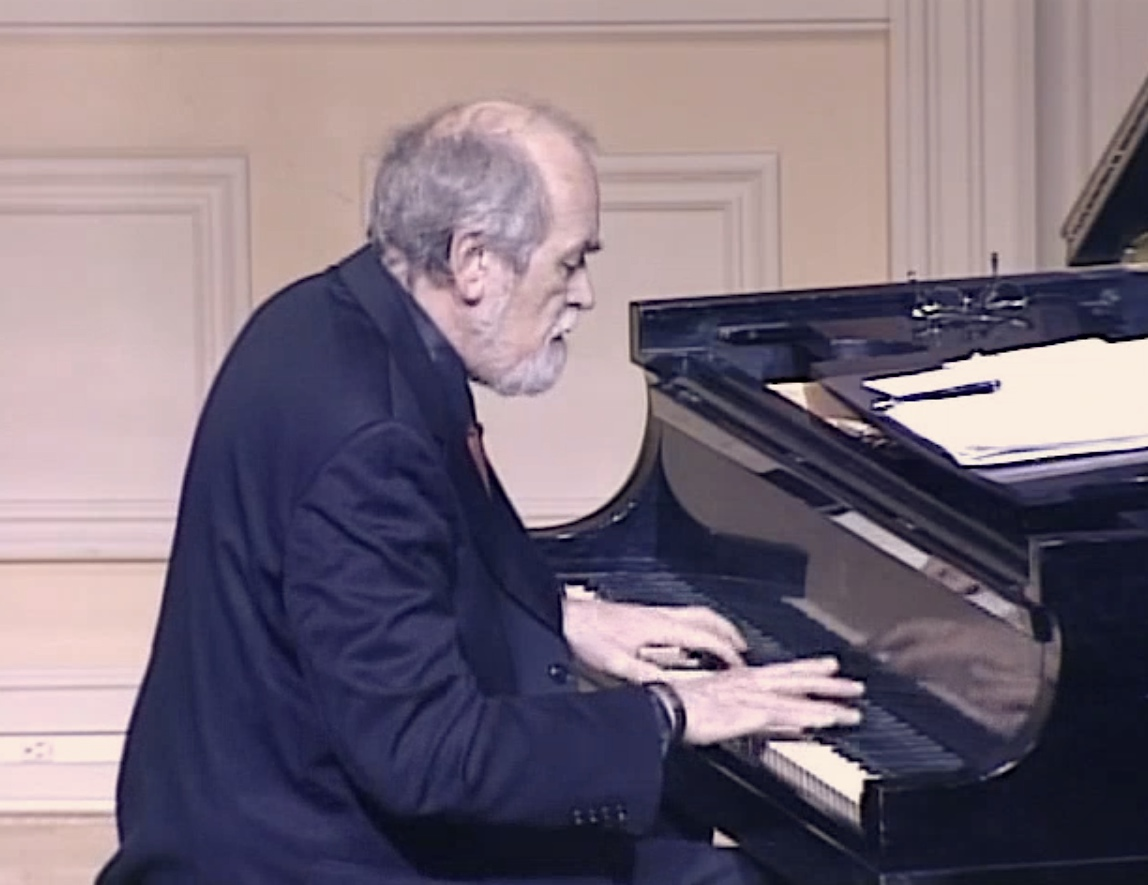
- Kellaway in 2011

Background information
- Born: 1 November 1939 (age 86); Waban, Massachusetts, U.S.
- Genres: Jazz; film score
- Occupations: Composer, arranger, bandleader, pianist
- Instrument: Piano
- Member of: Roger Kellaway Trio
- Website: rogerkellaway.com

Roger Kellaway (born November 1, 1939) is an American composer, arranger and jazz pianist, who has recorded over 250 albums, and composed over 20 film scores. He is a Grammy Award winner and an Academy Award nominee.

== Life and career ==
Kellaway was born in Waban, Massachusetts, United States. He is an alumnus of the New England Conservatory. Kellaway has composed commissioned works for ensembles of various sizes. He also has composed music for film, television, ballet and stage productions. Pianist Phil Saltman was one of his early mentors.

In 1964, Kellaway was a piano sideman for composer/arranger Boris Midney's group The Russian Jazz Quartet's album Happiness on ABC/Impulse jazz records.

Kellaway composed the closing theme, "Remembering You" for the television sitcom All in the Family, which was also used as the closing theme for the spinoff Archie Bunker's Place.

In 1970, Kellaway formed the Roger Kellaway Cello Quartet with cellist Edgar Lustgarden. Their piece "Come to the Meadow" was used as the theme for the NPR program Selected Shorts. For their 1978 album, Nostalgia Suite, the group became a quintet with drummer Joe Porcaro.

On November 7 and 8, 2008, Kellaway was bandleader and pianist for the Astral Weeks Live at the Hollywood Bowl concerts by Van Morrison, celebrating the 40th anniversary of Morrison's acclaimed 1968 album.

Kellaway was nominated for an Oscar for Best Adaptation Score for A Star Is Born (1976), and a Grammy Award for Best Instrumental Arrangement for the Eddie Daniels album Memos from Paradise (1988). Guitarist Robben Ford credits Kellaway and Tom Scott, whom he met while playing for Joni Mitchell, as major influences on his music. Kellaway was featured on Ilya Serov's original rendition of Django Reinhardt's song "Swing 42" in 2017.

== Discography ==
=== As leader ===
Year recorded	Title	Label	Notes
1963	A Portrait of Roger Kellaway	Regina	Some tracks trio, with Ben Tucker (bass), Dave Bailey (drums); some tracks quartet, with Jim Hall (guitar), Steve Swallow (bass), Tony Inzalaco (drums)
1965	The Roger Kellaway Trio	Prestige	Trio, with Russell George (bass), Dave Bailey (drums)
1966	Stride!	World Pacific	With Red Mitchell (bass), John Guerin (drums), strings, brass
1967	Spirit Feel	Liberty Records	With Tom Scott (alto and soprano sax), Chuck Domanico (bass), John Guerin (drums), Paul Beaver (tape recorder), Red Mitchell (bass on Double Fault)
1970	Say That Again	Dobre	Solo piano; Kellaway adds vocals on two tracks. All tracks on Dobre DR 1045 LP release (p) 1978 Expression Sound, Inc.
1971	Cello Quartet	A&M	with strings; Joe Pass (guitar) added on two tracks
1972	Center of the Circle	A&M	With various
1974	Come to the Meadow	A&M	With Edgar Lustgarten (cello), Chuck Domanico (bass), Emil Richards (drums)
1978	Nostalgia Suite	Discwasher	With various
1978	Solo Piano	Dobre	Solo piano Dobre DR 1027; re-released 2010 as Solo Piano (Digitally Remastered), Essential Media Group - 4943260
1981	Live at Michael's Pub	Jazz Mania	Duo, with Dick Hyman (piano); in concert
1982	As It Happened, Vol. 1	Jazz Heritage	Quartet, with Bob Brookmeyer (valve trombone), Chuck Domanico (bass), John Guerin (drums); in concert
1986	Ain't Misbehavin'		Solo piano
1986	In Japan	All Art Jazz	Some tracks solo piano; some tracks trio, with John Goldsby (bass), Terry Clarke (drums); some tracks quartet, with Valery Ponomarev (trumpet) added
1987	Fifty-Fifty	Stash Records	With Red Mitchell (bass), Brad Terry (whistling)
1987	The Art of Interconnectedness	Challenge	In concert
1988	Alone Together	Dragon	Duo, with Red Mitchell (bass)
1989	Some o' This and Some o' That	Dragon	With Putte Wickman (clarinet), Red Mitchell (bass)
1991	Live at Maybeck Recital Hall, Volume Eleven	Concord Jazz	Solo piano; in concert
1991	That Was That	Dragon	With Jan Allan (trumpet), Red Mitchell (bass)
1992	Roger Kellaway Meets The Duo: Gene Bertoncini and Michael Moore	Chiaroscuro	Trio, with Gene Bertoncini (guitar), Michael Moore (bass)
1992	Life's a Take	Concord Jazz	Duo, with Red Mitchell (bass); in concert
1993	Windows	Angel	With Emil Richards (marimba), Chuck Domanico (bass), Joe Porcaro and Bob Zimmitti (percussion), Fred Seykora (cello)
1996	Inside & Out	Concord	Duo, co-led with Ruby Braff (cornet)
1996	Soaring	Chintamani	Solo piano Chintamani CM9601(US)
2005	I Was There: Roger Kellaway Plays from the Bobby Darin Songbook	IPO	Solo piano
2005	Remembering Bobby Darin	IPO	Trio, with Bruce Forman (guitar), Dan Lutz (bass)
2006	Heroes	IPO	Trio, with Bruce Forman (guitar) Brad Lutz (bass)
2008	Live at the Jazz Standard	IPO	With Russell Malone (guitar), Jay Leonhart (bass), Stefon Harris (vibraphone), Borislav Strulev (cello); in concert
2013	Duke at the Roadhouse: Live in Santa Fe	IPO	Most tracks duo, co-led with Eddie Daniels (clarinet); some tracks trio, with James Holland (cello) added; in concert
2018	New Jazz Standards Vol. 3	Summit	Trio, with Jay Leonhart (bass), Peter Erskine (drums)
2019	The Many Open Minds of Roger Kellaway		Trio, with Bruce Forman (guitar), Dan Lutz (bass).
2024	Live at Smalls	Cellar Music Group	With Abraham Burton, George Burton, Boris Kozlov, and Donald Edwards
2024	Live at Mezzrow	Cellar Music Group	With Jay Leonhart, Dennis Mackerel, and Roni Ben-Hur

=== As arranger ===
With Melanie

- Born to Be (Buddah, 1968)
- Gather Me (Neighborhood/Buddah, 1971)
- Stoneground Words (Neighborhood, 1972)
- Madrugada (Neighborhood, 1973)

With Carmen McRae

- I Am Music (Blue Note, 1975)

With Diane Schuur

- Love Songs (UMG, 1993)

With Liza Minnelli

- Gently (Angel, 1996)

With Robben Ford

- Supernatural (GRP, 1999)

With Gary Lemel

- Moonlighting (Warner, 1999)

=== As sideman ===
With Kenny Burrell

- Guitar Forms (Verve, 1964–65)

With The Russian Jazz Quartet

- Happiness (Impulse!, 1964)

With Stan Getz

- Stan Getz Plays Music from the Soundtrack of Mickey One (MGM, 1965)

With J. J. Johnson and Kai Winding

- Betwixt & Between (A&M/CTI, 1969)

With George Harrison

- Dark Horse (Apple, 1974)

With Jimmy Knepper

- Jimmy Knepper in L.A. (Discomate, 1977)

With Herbie Mann

- Herbie Mann Plays The Roar of the Greasepaint – The Smell of the Crowd (Atlantic, 1965)

With Mark Murphy

- That's How I Love the Blues! (Riverside, 1962)

With Oliver Nelson

- More Blues and the Abstract Truth (Impulse!, 1964)
- Soulful Brass with Steve Allen (Impulse!, 1968)
- Black, Brown and Beautiful (Flying Dutchman, 1969)

With Art Pepper

- Unreleased Art Pepper Vol. 2 — the Last Concert (Widow's Choice, 2019)

With Sonny Rollins

- Alfie (Impulse!, 1966)

With Lalo Schifrin

- There's a Whole Lalo Schifrin Goin' On (Dot, 1968)

With Bud Shank

- Let It Be (Pacific Jazz, 1970)

With Zoot Sims

- Just Friends with Harry Sweets Edison

With Sonny Stitt

- Broadway Soul (Colpix, 1965)

With Clark Terry

- The Happy Horns of Clark Terry (Impulse!, 1964)
- Tonight (Mainstream, 1965)
- The Power of Positive Swinging (Mainstream, 1965)

With Ben Webster

- See You at the Fair (Impulse!, 1964)

With Kai Winding

- Rainy Day (Verve, 1965)

With Jimmy Witherspoon

- Blues for Easy Livers (Prestige, 1965)

With Stéphane Grappelli & Yo-Yo Ma

- Anything Goes (CBS, 1989)
