= Live at Maybeck Recital Hall, Volume Two =

Live album by Dave McKenna
- Recorded: November 1989
- Venue: Maybeck Recital Hall, Berkeley, California, U.S.
- Genre: Jazz
- Label: Concord

Live at Maybeck Recital Hall, Volume Two is an album of solo performances by jazz pianist Dave McKenna, recorded in 1989.

== Music and recording ==
The album was recorded in November 1989 at the Maybeck Recital Hall in Berkeley, California. Some of the tracks are medleys and are based on themes in the titles.

Pianist Liam Noble commented on "Dream Dancing": "What you feel is the pulse, always, the constant polyphony between the hands serving the bounce, always. As the right hand lines move into the shriller high register, he backs off, similarly with the low end. The balance is impeccable, but it’s a warm perfection. When he shifts tempo halfway through, it's an easy slide not an abrupt shift.".

== Release and reception ==
Professional ratings
Review scores
Source	Rating
AllMusic	4.5/5 stars
The Penguin Guide to Jazz	3.5/4 stars
The Encyclopedia of Popular Music	2/5 stars

It was released by Concord Records. The AllMusic reviewer concluded: "Beautifully recorded and performed, this valuable CD was one of many Maybeck titles that was unfortunately deleted from Concord's active catalog."

== Track listing ==
1. "Spoken Introduction"
2. "Dream Dancing"
3. "Detour Ahead"
4. "Exactly Like You"
5. "I'm Glad There Is You/I'm Glad I Waited for You"
6. "Knowledge Medley: Teach Me Tonight/School Days/An Apple for the Teacher/I Didn't Know About You"
7. "Knowledge Medley (Part 2): I Didn't Know What Time It Was/I Wish I Knew/I Don't Know Enough About You"
8. "I Don't Know Why (I Just Do)/You'll Never Know"
9. "I Never Knew"
10. "'C' Jam Blues"
11. "Limehouse Blues"

== Personnel ==
- Dave McKenna – piano
