= Live at Maybeck Recital Hall, Volume Five =

Live album by Stanley Cowell
- Released: 1990
- Recorded: June 1990
- Venue: Maybeck Recital Hall, Berkeley, California, U.S.
- Genre: Jazz
- Label: Concord

Live at Maybeck Recital Hall, Volume Five is an album of solo performances by jazz pianist Stanley Cowell, recorded in 1990.

== Music and recording ==
The album was recorded in June 1990 at the Maybeck Recital Hall in Berkeley, California. Most of the material is standards and common bebop pieces, with some Cowell compositions added. The originals include "Cal Massey", a tribute to the trumpeter. Cowell plays in all twelve keys during "Softly, as in a Morning Sunrise".

== Release and reception ==
Professional ratings
Review scores
Source	Rating
AllMusic	4.5/5 stars
The Penguin Guide to Jazz	3.5/4 stars
Tom Hull – on the Web	B

Live at Maybeck Recital Hall, Volume Five was released by Concord Records. The AllMusic reviewer described it as "A very interesting recital." The Penguin Guide to Jazz concluded that it is "An excellent set by a master at the height of his considerable powers."

== Track listing ==
1. "Softly, as in a Morning Sunrise"
2. "Stompin' at the Savoy"
3. "I Am Waiting"
4. "Nefertiti"
5. "Jitterbug Waltz"
6. "Stella by Starlight"
7. "I'll Remember April"
8. "Lament"
9. "Out Of This World"
10. "Django"
11. "Big Foot"
12. "Little Sunny"
13. "Autumn Leaves"
14. "Cal Massey"

== Personnel ==
- Stanley Cowell – piano
