= John Colianni =

American jazz pianist (1962–2023)

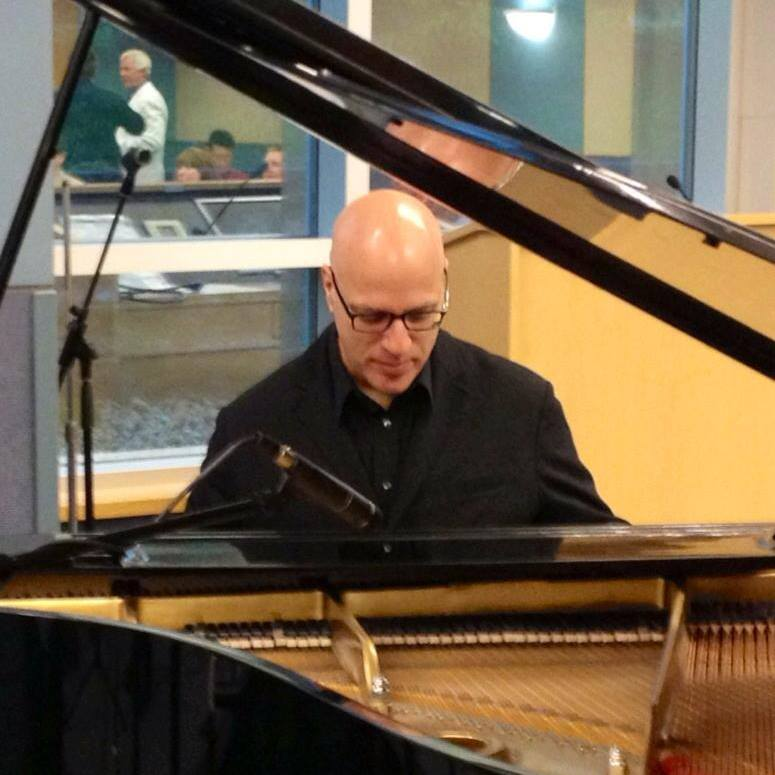

Background information
- Born: John Kelly Colaianni; January 7, 1962; Paterson, New Jersey, U.S.
- Died: November 28, 2023 (aged 61) Langhorne, Pennsylvania, U.S.
- Genres: Jazz
- Occupation: Musician
- Instrument: Piano
- Years active: 1970s–2023
- Labels: Concord, Patuxent
- Website: johncolianni.com

John Kelly Colianni (January 7, 1962 – November 28, 2023) was an American jazz pianist.

== Early life ==
The son of Patricia Colaianni and journalist James F. Colaianni, John Colianni was born in Paterson, New Jersey, on January 7, 1962, and grew up in Maryland. Duke Ellington performed a concert in 1974 at Georgetown University. Colianni was mesmerized by Ellington's piano work, orchestrations, and stage presence. Weekly lessons began at the age of 14.

== Career ==
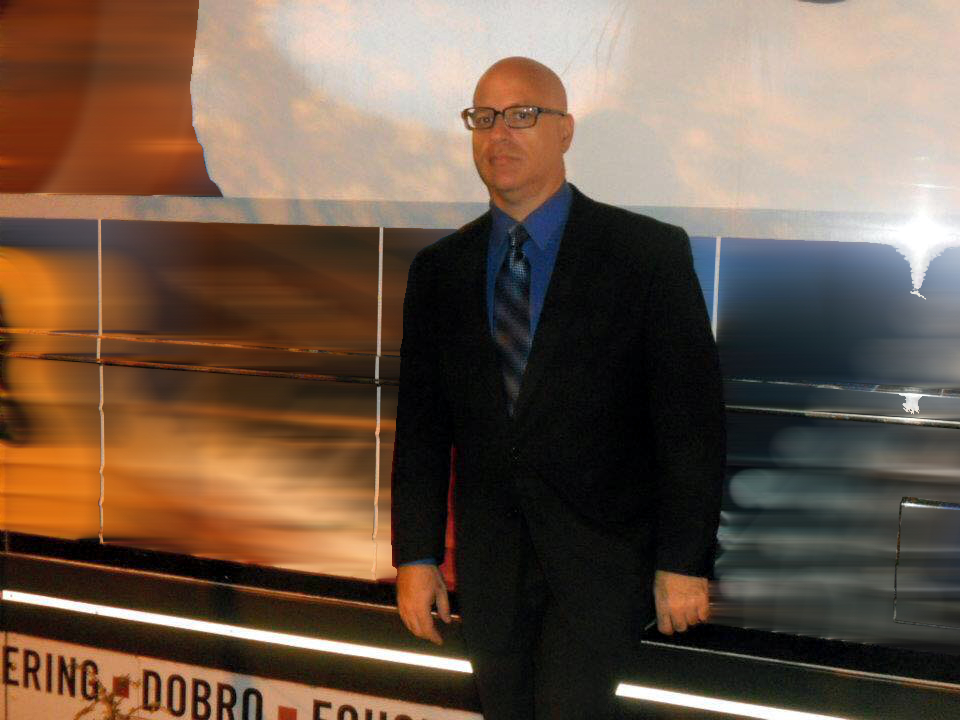

Colianni played in jazz clubs in Washington D.C., and appeared as a teen with a traveling group of young musicians known as Jazz Stars of the Future. This group performed under the direction of Keter Betts. During his last year of high school, Colianni moved to New Jersey with his family.

Colianni became a pianist in Lionel Hampton's big band for three years. His debut album was released by Concord Records. He came in third in the 1987 Thelonious Monk Institute of Jazz International Piano Competition in Washington D.C.

From 1987 to 1990 he played with film director and clarinetist Woody Allen's Ragtime and Funeral Orchestra. He recorded with Mel Tormé and toured with him in the early 1990s. From 2003–2009 he was a member of a trio led by guitarist Les Paul. From 2010–2013 he toured and recorded with the trio of Larry Coryell. In 2004 he worked with vocalist Anita O'Day. He recorded with Joe Wilder, Connie Kay, Emily Remler, Mel Lewis, and Lew Tabackin.

== Death ==
Colianni died in Langhorne, Pennsylvania, on November 28, 2023, at the age of 61.

== Discography ==
=== As leader ===
- John Colianni (Concord Jazz, 1986)
- Blues-o-Matic (Concord Jazz, 1989)
- At Maybeck (Concord Jazz, 1995)
- Colianni & Company (1998)
- Swings (Amosaya, 1999)
- Johnny Chops (Patuxent, 2008)
- On Target (Patuxent, 2011)
- After Hours (Patuxent, 2015)
- I Never Knew (Patuxent, 2018)
- Ahead of the Crowd (Patuxent, 2021)

=== As sideman ===
With Mel Torme

- Christmas Songs (Telarc, 1992)
- Nothing Without You (Concord Jazz, 1992)
- Sing, Sing, Sing (Concord Jazz, 1993)
- The Great American Songbook: Live at Michael's Pub (Telarc, 1993)
- A Tribute to Bing Crosby (Concord Jazz, 1994)

With others

- Muriel Anderson, Wildcat (Heartstrings Attached, 2005)
- Larry Coryell, Montgomery (Patuxent, 2011)
- Lionel Hampton, Made in Japan (Timeless, 1983)
- Lionel Hampton, Mostly Ballads (Musicmasters, 1990)
