= Adam Makowicz =

Polish pianist and composer

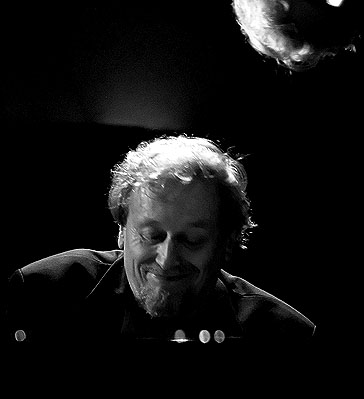

Background information
- Born: Adam Matyszkowicz; 18 August 1940 (age 86); Hnojník, Cieszyn Silesia, Nazi Germany
- Genres: Jazz, classical piano
- Occupations: Musician, composer
- Instrument: Piano
- Years active: 1965–present
- Label: Jaymz Bee

Adam Makowicz (born Adam Matyszkowicz; 18 August 1940) is a Polish pianist and composer living in New York. He performs jazz and classical piano pieces, as well as his own compositions.

== Biography ==
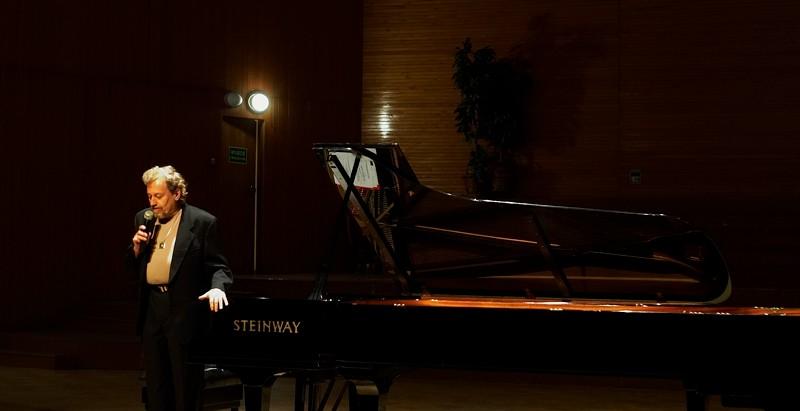
Adam Makowicz concert appearance at Rzeszów Philharmonia, 2006

Adam Makowicz was born into a family of ethnic Poles in Hnojník (Cieszyn Silesia, now in the Czech Republic), in an area annexed by Nazi Germany at the beginning of World War II. After the war, he was raised in Poland. He studied classical music at the Chopin Conservatory of Music in Kraków. Overcoming cultural restrictions under the communist government, he developed a passion for modern jazz. At the time, political freedom and improvisation were disapproved of by the pro-Soviet authorities. Nonetheless, he embarked on a new professional life by switching from the career of a classical pianist to that of a touring jazz pianist. After years of hardship, Makowicz gained a regular gig at a small jazz club in a cellar of a house in Kraków. He was named the "Best jazz pianist" by the readers of Poland's Jazz Forum magazine, and was awarded a gold medal for his contribution to the arts.

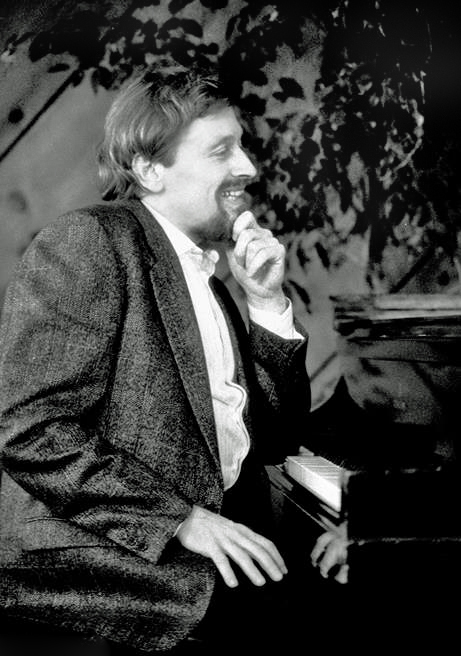
Adam Makowicz at Bach Dancing & Dynamite Society, Half Moon Bay CA, mid-1980s

In 1977, Makowicz made a 10-week concert tour of the United States, produced by John Hammond. At that time, he recorded a solo album titled Adam on CBS. In 1977, he settled in New York. Makowicz was banned from Poland during the 1980s after the Polish regime imposed martial law to crush the Solidarity movement. At that time, he took part in Ronald Reagan's initiative called "Let Poland Be Poland", joining many artists and public figures.

During the 2000s, he moved to Toronto, Canada, and continued his career as a concert pianist and recording artist. In the course of his career, Makowicz has performed with major symphony orchestras, such as the National Symphony Orchestra, at Carnegie Hall, at the Kennedy Center, and other major concert halls in Americas and in Europe. He has recorded over 30 albums of jazz, popular, and classical music, with his own arrangements of pieces by Chopin, Gershwin, Berlin, Kern, Porter, Rodgers, and other composers. Makowicz also wrote and recorded his own compositions for piano.

Makowicz has been building bridges between cultures by his numerous concerts performance and recordings of cross-cultural and cross-style compositions. He performed and recorded music by Chopin and Gershwin with the Warsaw Philharmonic, Moscow Philharmonic Orchestra, National Symphony in Washington, London Royal Philharmonic Orchestra, and other internationally recognized companies. In 1999, in commemoration of 150th anniversary of Chopin's death, Adam Makowicz played his piano tribute to Chopin at the French embassy in Washington. His interpretations of classical pieces by Chopin and Gershwin are marked by finesse, inventiveness, and extraordinary technical virtuosity.

== Instruments ==
- Bösendorfer pianos – some live performances in the 1990s and 2000s, some recordings
- Steinway & Sons pianos – most stage performances with symphony orchestras, and solo from 1950s through the 2000s, some recordings
- Baldwin pianos – some performances in the USA
- C. Bechstein Pianofortefabrik pianos – live performances and some recordings in Europe
- Bluthner pianos – some performances in Europe
- Fazioli pianos – some performances
- Rhodes electric piano – live recording in Europe
- Yamaha pianos – some performances and studio recordings
- Grand Malmsjö piano – Blue Sapphires LP recording

== Selected discography ==
=== As Leader ===
- 1972 Newborn Light (Cameo) with Urszula Dudziak
- 1973 Unit (Muza)
- 1975 Live Embers (Muza)
- 1977 Piano Vista Unlimited (Helicon)
- 1978 Adam (Columbia)
- 1978 Winter Flowers (Supraphon)
- 1981 From My Window (Choice Records)
- 1982 Classic Jazz Duets (Stash Records) with George Mraz (b)
- 1983 The Name Is Makowicz (Sheffield Lab) with Phil Woods (as)
- 1986 Moonray (RCA)
- 1987 Naughty Baby (RCA)
- 1987 Interface (Sonet)
- 1989 Swiss Encounter (East-West with James Morrison
- 1992 Plays Irving Berlin (VWC Records)
- 1992 Adam Makowicz at Maybeck Recital Hall Berkeley (Concord) solo Cole Porter
- 1993 The Music Of Jerome Kern (Concord) with George Mraz (b) Alan Dawson (dm)
- 1993 The Solo Album - Adam in Stockholm (Verve)
- 1994 Concord Duo Series Vol. 5 Live (Concord) with George Mraz (b)
- 1994 My Favorite Things: The Music of Richard Rodgers (Concord)
- 1997 A Tribute To Art Tatum (VWC Records)
- 1997 A Handful of Stars (Chiaroscuro Records)
- 1998 Gershwin (Agencja)
- 2000 Reflections On Chopin (AM Records)
- 2000 Plays Duke Ellington (Showcase Records)
- 2003 Songs For Manhattan (AM Records)
- 2004 At The Carnegie Hall (Pomaton EMI) with Leszek Mozdzer
- 2005 From My Field (AM Records)
- 2007 Indigo Bliss (Universal Music)
- 2008 Makowicz & Orkiestra Filharmonii Częstochowskiej, dyr. Jerzy Salwarowski (Warner Music Poland)
- 2010 Brillante – The Adam Makowicz Chopin Project (A.M. Global Arts Management)
- 2014 Jazzovia Presents Makowicz Plays Kobylinski (Jazzovia)
- 2018 Swinging Ivories (AM piano)
- 2023 Welcome Back, Adam (AM piano)
- 2023 Blue Sapphires (AM Piano)
- 2025 Makowicz & Medyna – New York Flavors (For Tune)
