= Marian McPartland =

English-American jazz pianist and radio host (1918–2013)

Marian McPartland OBE
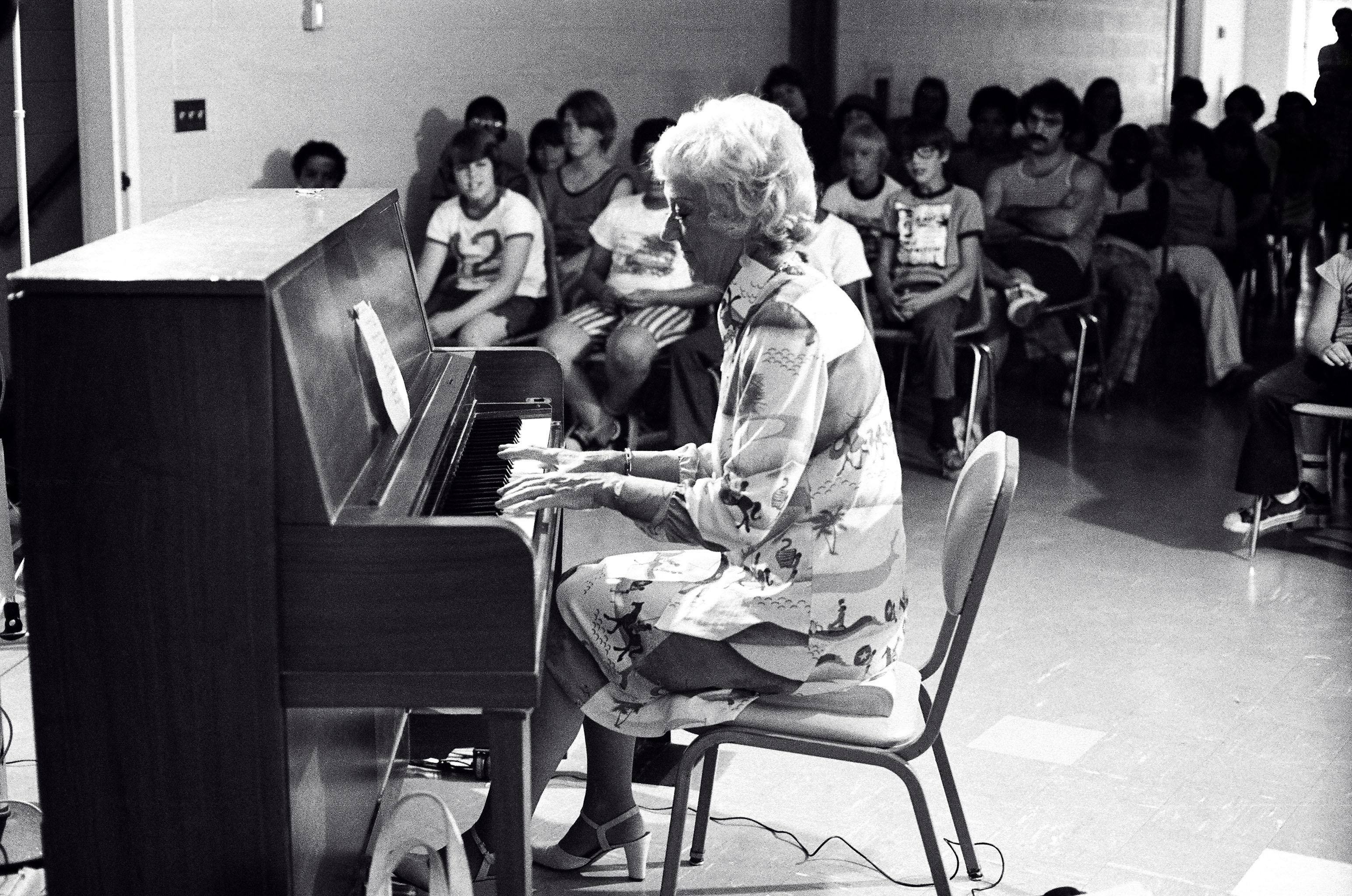
- McPartland playing at St. Joseph's Villa near Rochester, New York, in 1975

Background information
- Born: Margaret Marian Turner; 20 March 1918; Slough, England
- Died: 20 August 2013 (aged 95) Port Washington, New York, US
- Genres: Cool jazz, bebop, mainstream jazz, swing, post-bop
- Occupations: Pianist, composer, radio host, writer
- Instrument: Piano
- Years active: 1938–2013
- Labels: Halcyon, Concord Jazz, Jazz Alliance, Bainbridge, Savoy, Capitol, RCA

Margaret Marian McPartland OBE (née Turner; 20 March 1918 – 20 August 2013), was an English and American jazz pianist, composer, and writer. She was the host of Marian McPartland's Piano Jazz on National Public Radio from 1978 to 2011.

After her marriage to trumpeter Jimmy McPartland in February 1945, she resided in the United States when not travelling to perform. In 1969, she founded Halcyon Records, a recording company that issued albums for 10 years. In 2000, she was named a National Endowment for the Arts Jazz Master. In 2004, she was given a Grammy Award for lifetime achievement. In 2007, she was inducted into the National Radio Hall of Fame. Although known mostly for jazz, she composed other types of music as well, performing her own symphonic work A Portrait of Rachel Carson with the University of South Carolina Symphony Orchestra in 2007. In 2010, she was named a member of the Order of the British Empire.

== Early life ==
Margaret Marian Turner was born on 20 March 1918 to Frank and Janet (née Payne) Turner in Slough, Berkshire, west of central London, England. She had one younger sibling, a sister, Joyce. She demonstrated early aptitude at the piano, and would later realize that she had perfect pitch. Margaret (Maggie to her family) studied violin from the age of nine, but never took to the instrument. She also trained as a vocalist and received a number of favorable reviews in the local paper. Janet refused to find her daughter a piano teacher until the age of 16, by which time Margaret was already adept at learning songs by ear. This lack of early education meant that Margaret was never a strong reader of notated music, and would always prefer to learn through listening.

Turner studied at Miss Hammond's School for Young Children from 1924 to 1927, Avonclyffe from 1927 to 1929, Holy Trinity Convent from 1929 to 1933, and finally Stratford House for Girls from 1933 to 1935. There, she met Doris Mackie, a teacher who would be hugely influential on her. Mackie suggested to the Turners that Margaret should apply to the Guildhall School of Music and Drama in London, since she clearly had an aptitude and passion for music. She was accepted in the spring of 1935 on the merit of her "rampant enthusiasm, God-given faculty, and a dangerous surplus of imagination" and in spite of the fact that she was "sadly lacking in technique."

== Early career (Europe) ==
Turner pursued studies at the Guildhall School of Music and Drama in London, where she worked toward a performance degree that would enable her to become a concert pianist, though she also did coursework in vocal performance. She studied with Orlando Morgan, who also taught Myra Hess. Turner's talents for improvisation and composition were recognized early when she won the Wainwright Memorial Scholarship for Composition, the Worshipful Company of Musicians Composition Scholarship, and the Chairman's School Composition Prize in 1936 and 1937. Much to her family's dismay, she developed a love for American jazz and musicians such as Duke Ellington, Fats Waller, Teddy Wilson, and Mary Lou Williams, among others. In 1938, Turner sought out Billy Mayerl at his School of Modern Syncopation to seek lessons, and was convinced to audition for his piano quartet. Despite her family's efforts to keep her at Guildhall, Turner left to join Billy Mayerl's Claviers, a four-piano vaudeville act. There, she elected to perform under the stage name of Marian Page. She promised her family that she would one day return to finish her degree at Guildhall. After the Claviers tour, Marian returned to London in the fall of 1938 and played sporadically for shows and on the Carroll Lewis Show. To avoid conscription during World War II, she volunteered for the Entertainment National Service Association (ENSA), a group that was playing for Allied troops, in fall 1940. In 1944, her friend Zonie Dale recommended that Marian join the United Service Organizations (USO) because they paid more and played with American men.

With the USO, Marian went through basic training and was issued a set of combat gear – GI boots, helmet, and uniform. Marian was assigned to a group called the Band Wagon, which followed the Allied forces after the D-Day invasion. In anticipation of wartime demands, Marian learned to play the accordion in the event that there was no piano available with which to play for the troops.

In St Vith, Belgium, on 14 October 1944, Marian met a Chicago cornetist named Jimmy McPartland at a jam session. McPartland had volunteered for the army and was serving active duty when his superiors realized that he could do better work as an entertainer, since he was well known among the troops. Jimmy was solicited to put together a sextet to entertain the troops, and invited Marian to join him as their pianist. They soon fell in love, and signed an official US Army marriage document on 14 December 1944. They married on 3 February 1945, in Aachen, Germany, and played at their own military base wedding. Her marriage to an American male automatically gave Marian US citizenship, side by side with her British citizenship. Marian was reluctant to tell her parents of the marriage, and had Jimmy's commanding officer tell them when he had lunch with them in England in early 1945. It was with Jimmy that Marian began her first real training in jazz. Jimmy and Marian did their first recording together on 6 January 1946 in London before leaving for the US. They arrived in New York City on 23 April 1946, and Marian would never live outside of the US again. However, she kept her British citizenship throughout her life.

== Early career (Chicago 1946–50 and New York City 1950–62) ==
After the war, Marian and Jimmy moved to Chicago to be near his family. Jimmy was raised in the Austin neighborhood of Chicago, and was an original member of the Austin High Gang that played Chicago-style Dixieland jazz in the 1920s. In June 1946, Marian made her American debut at the Moose Lodge. Soon, Jimmy's group, which now included Marian, landed a standing gig at the Rose Bowl through the end of 1946. This engagement was followed by ones at Taboo, Capitol Lounge, and finally Brass Rail. Marian flourished in Jimmy's group, and by her association with him. They played at clubs like Blue Note and Silhouette with stars like Billie Holiday.

During their Chicago years, Jimmy and Marian visited France in 1949 for the Paris Jazz Festival. This was semi-important for their association with the European jazz scene, but more significant because it marked the beginning of Marian's writing career. Marian's testimonial about the festival ran in the July 1949 issue of DownBeat.

In 1949, the McPartlands settled in Manhattan, living in an apartment in the same building as the Nordstrom Sisters. In 1950, she announced that she would no longer go by her stage name, Marian Page, but would now go by her married name, Marian McPartland. With Jimmy's help and encouragement, Marian started her own trio, which started performing at the newly opened 54th street club called The Embers on 8 May 1951. Here, she learned how to lead her own group, and played with musicians such as Roy Eldridge, Coleman Hawkins, and Terry Gibbs. After trying out different combos, she settled on a trio of piano, bass, and drums that would soon become standard. This gig led to a laudatory DownBeat profile by Leonard Feather, an advocate for women in jazz, who wrote that French fans would be unlikely to accept her because "She is English, white and a girl--three hopeless strikes against her from the Gallic angle. Yet, if you ask Coleman Hawkins...or any of the other cats...you'll know from their enthusiasm that ...She's a fine, swinging pianist..." (McPartland sometimes loosely paraphrased Feather as saying "Oh, she'll never make it: she's English, white and a woman.") She signed her first record deal without Jimmy in 1951, with Savoy Records. On 2 February 1952, McPartland opened a gig at the Hickory House that continued regularly through November 1962. During her time at the Hickory House, Duke Ellington would often be in the audience. Ellington was influential on McPartland's development as a pianist, and told her she played too many notes, a sentiment she would take to heart. The drummer Joe Morello joined the group in 1953 and was a member of the trio until he departed to join Dave Brubeck's Quartet in late 1956. In December 1953, Bill Crow replaced Vinnie Burke as her bass player. This trio of McPartland, Morello, and Crow would stay together through 1956, and be named Small Group of the Year by Metronome in 1954. The success of this trio would lead to the signing of McPartland to Capitol Records for five albums. The group of McPartland, Crow, and Morello would become McPartland's best-known trio. It has been argued that McPartland never received the acclaim she deserved because she never stayed with any sidemen long enough to develop a unique sound, her 1953-1956 group being the exception to this rule.

In 1956, McPartland and Morello began an affair that would continue for almost ten years. In late 1956, Morello's wife discovered their affair, and Brubeck hired Morello away.

McPartland continued writing testimonial pieces for journals such as Down Beat after the favorable reception of her first piece in 1949. Toward the end of the 1950s, she began to write about the issue of being a woman in jazz. She questioned "Can't we women make our own contribution to jazz by playing like women, but still capturing the essential elements of jazz – good beat – good ideas – honesty and true feeling?"

In the 1953–54 season, McPartland appeared as a regular on NBC's Judge for Yourself quiz program emceed by Fred Allen.

In 1958 a black and white group portrait of 57 notable jazz musicians, including McPartland, was photographed in front of a brownstone in Harlem, New York City. Art Kane, a freelance photographer working for Esquire magazine, took the photo, which was called, "A Great Day in Harlem", and it became a well-known image of New York's jazz musicians of the time. Immediately preceding her death in August 2013, she was one of only four of the 57 participating musicians who were still alive. After many years of recording for labels such as Capitol, Savoy, Argo, Sesac, Time, and Dot, in 1969 she founded her own record label, Halcyon Records, before having a long association with the Concord label. Marian and Jimmy divorced in 1972, but they remained close, and remarried in 1991, shortly before Jimmy's death.

== Mid-career (New York City 1962–78) ==
After McPartland's Hickory House engagement ended, Benny Goodman offered her a spot in his septet for his 1963 tour. It quickly became clear that Goodman did not like her more modern playing style, and she shifted out of the full septet to play exclusively in the trio numbers. The physical and emotional strain of the last few years weighed hard on Marian during the stressful tour, and she checked herself into the Menninger Clinic in Topeka, Kansas for two weeks as an outpatient when the tour finished. There, she was referred to Dr. William Benjamin, a psychotherapist who would counsel her for many years.

McPartland's counselling with Benjamin eventually led her to a number of important choices, the first being the decision to end her affair with Morello in the spring of 1964. The second was her decision to divorce Jimmy in the summer of 1967, a separation that was made public in December of the same year. Despite their divorce, Marian and Jimmy would remain close friends and eventually remarry weeks before Jimmy's 1991 death.

In the late 1960s, McPartland began reviewing albums for DownBeat. During 1966–69, she reviewed 34 albums. Her perspective was unique, because she approached the review from her background as a peer musician. After 1969, she stopped reviewing, but continued to write instructional pieces. In May 1966, she began hosting a weekly radio show called A Delicate Balance that aired for two hours each Saturday. The show began as a traditional program, but soon shifted to include interviews as well. These interviews and connections would prove to be an important precursor to McPartland's Piano Jazz series.

Marian struggled to connect to the avant-garde jazz of the late 1960s, though she did endeavor to learn and adapt the free jazz style for her own use. She was not in high demand as a performer through the 1960s, and her focus shifted to focus on jazz education. Marian became aware of the need for jazz education when she was convinced to do a workshop at a high school in Rochester, New York, in 1956. She realized that the adolescents were totally unaware of jazz, and utterly enamored with the new rock and roll sweeping the country. In 1964, she began teaching at jazz clinics organized by Clem DeRosa, one of her former drummers. DeRosa was developing a jazz curriculum in the Huntington, New York school district. In 1966, DeRosa received a grant that allowed him to further develop his method, and he moved to the Cold Spring Harbor High School. Through this grant, he was able to pay Marian full-time to teach with him through 1967. McPartland continued to work in jazz education throughout the following decade. One of her most challenging projects was in 1974 when she received a Washington DC grant to teach in poor black neighborhoods. McPartland would be recognized for her work in jazz education in 1986, when she received the Jazz Educator of the Year award. She would continue to teach and judge jazz festivals for young people for the rest of her life.

During an engagement at the Apartment, a New York club, in February 1967 she met Alec Wilder, a man with whom she would develop a great friendship and who would encourage her to write and compose. They encountered each other again when Marian was touring in Rochester and began a collaboration that would become important, though difficult, for both of them. In 1974, Marian recorded an album, Marian McPartland Plays the Music of Alec Wilder, which was released by Halcyon Records.

After many years of recording for labels such as Capitol, Savoy, Argo Records, Sesac, Time, Design, and Dot Records, in 1969 McPartland co-founded her own record label, Halcyon Records. She would later have a long association with the Concord Records label. McPartland founded Halcyon with Sherman Fairchild and Hank O'Neal. They joined with a mind to produce the work of underrated or underrepresented jazz artists. Their first album was Interplay, a McPartland–Linc Milliman (bass) album of duets. Fairchild died in 1971, and McPartland bought out O'Neal in order to maintain the label for self-distribution or other projects. The last Halcyon album was released in 1979.

By 1977, McPartland had become a public advocate for women in jazz, and headlined the first Women's Jazz Festival, which took place in Kansas City, 17–19 March 1978. In the late '70s, Marian performed internationally, including appearances in Asia, Europe, South America, and across the United States. McPartland rarely used women in her combos, but she helped many young women find their feet in the jazz business such as Mary Fettig (first female musician in the Stan Kenton band) and Susannah McCorkle.

McPartland appears in the 5 December 1977 issue of The New Yorker – Goings on About Town, "presides over the keyboard in the Bemelmans Bar (at the Carlyle Hotel) Mondays through Saturdays from nine-thirty to one (a.m.)." It's likely this was a gig she held for a time in 1977.

In 1978, McPartland performed Grieg's Piano Concerto in A Minor with the Rochester Philharmonic Orchestra. Though the performance was poorly reviewed by most critics, she went on to perform the work with many symphonies across the country. Due to her poor sight-reading skills, she learned the piece principally by ear.

== Late career (Piano Jazz and on) ==
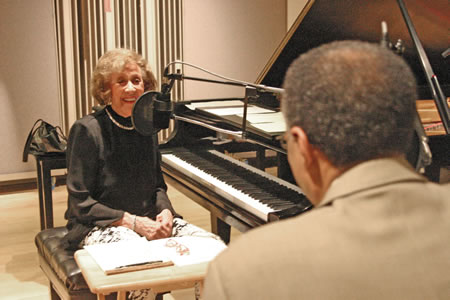
Marian McPartland interviews Ramsey Lewis on her radio show, Marian McPartland's Piano Jazz in 2009

In 1964, Marian McPartland launched a new venture on WBAI-FM (New York City), conducting a weekly radio program that featured recordings and interviews with guests. Pacifica Radio's West Coast stations also carried this series, which paved the way for Marian McPartland's Piano Jazz, a National Public Radio (NPR) series that began recording on 8 October 1978 and premiered on 1 April 1979 on WLTR (South Carolina) and was offered nationally by NPR. McPartland was offered the opportunity primarily on the recommendation of her friend Alec Wilder, who hosted American Popular Song until his health prevented him from continuing the program. Piano Jazz was the longest-running cultural program on NPR, as well as one of the longest-running jazz programs ever produced on public radio. The theme, "Kaleidoscope", was an original composition by McPartland. The program featured McPartland at the keyboard with guest performers, usually pianists, but also singers, guitarists, other musicians, and even the author Studs Terkel, who was not a musician. The first show aired 1 April 1979, with guest Mary Lou Williams. Several Piano Jazz programs have been released on CD by Concord Records.

In 1984, Piano Jazz received the Peabody Award for excellence in broadcasting. In 1986, it won both the Gabriel Award and the NY Gold Medal Awards.

She celebrated the 25th anniversary of the NPR series with a live taping at the Kennedy Center for which Peter Cincotti was the guest. After not having recorded a new show since September 2010, on 10 November 2011, NPR announced that McPartland was stepping down as host of Piano Jazz. She then asked her long-time friend, jazz pianist Jon Weber, to carry on with the show. As a result, Piano Jazz: Rising Stars, an NPR series hosted by Weber, began broadcast on 3 January 2012. Piano Jazz soon returned to the air in repeat broadcasts. Due to Marian's increased profile, mostly from the success of Piano Jazz, she began booking increasingly prestigious shows and recording more often. McPartland was beloved for bringing in an underrepresented demographic to jazz clubs. She also used her celebrity to champion young artists and feature them in her combos.

In 1979, McPartland received an NEH grant to write a book about women in jazz, focusing specifically on The International Sweethearts of Rhythm. This endeavor was further supported with a 1980 Guggenheim Fellowship. Although she published a provisional essay in June 1980, she struggled to complete her book. In the early '80s, many books were published about the rise of women in jazz, including interviews with many of the same people that she interviewed, thereby reducing the novelty of her own research. She eventually published a collection of 13 essays, All in Good Time, in 1987. She attempted to write her autobiography for many years, with the encouragement of Alec Wilder, but never completed the project.

== Death and legacy ==
DownBeat honored McPartland with a Lifetime Achievement Award in 1994.

McPartland was awarded a Grammy in 2004, a Trustees' Lifetime Achievement Award, for her work as an educator, writer, and host of NPR Radio's long-running Marian McPartland's Piano Jazz. Although a master at adapting to her guest's musical styles and having a well-known affinity for beautiful and harmonically rich ballads, she also recorded many tunes of her own. Her compositions included "Ambiance", "There'll Be Other Times", "With You in Mind", "Twilight World", and "In the Days of Our Love".

Just before her 90th birthday, McPartland composed and performed a symphonic piece, A Portrait of Rachel Carson, to mark the centennial of the environmental pioneer.

McPartland was appointed Officer of the Order of the British Empire (OBE) in the 2010 New Year Honours, "For services to jazz and to aspiring young musicians in the USA".

McPartland's encyclopaedic knowledge of jazz standards, highly musical ear, involvement in over 60 years of evolving jazz styles, and rich experience blending with radio guests led to a musical style that was described as "flexible and complex, and almost impossible to pigeonhole." She was known as a harmonically and rhythmically complex and inventive improviser. "She was never content to be in one place, and always kept improving. She has great ears and great harmonics. Because of her ear, she can go into two or three different keys in a tune and shift with no problem."

McPartland was also a synesthete, associating different musical keys with colours, stating that "The key of D is daffodil yellow, B major is maroon, and B flat is blue."

McPartland died at her home in Port Washington, New York on 20 August 2013. She was 95.

== Discography ==
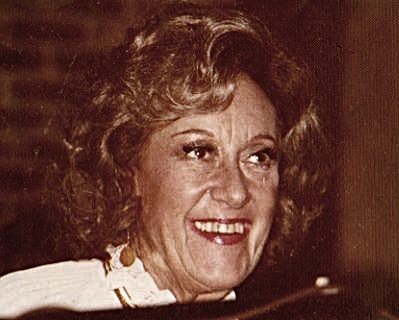
Jazz pianist Marian McPartland at the Village Jazz Lounge in Walt Disney World

- Jazz at Storyville (Savoy, 1951)
- Lullaby of Birdland (Savoy, 1952)
- Marian McPartland Trio (Savoy, 1952)
- The Magnificent Marian McPartland at the Piano (Savoy, 1952)
- Moods (Savoy, 1953)
- Jazz at the Hickory House (Savoy, 1953)
- Marian McPartland at the Hickory House (Capitol, 1954)
- Marian McPartland After Dark (Capitol, 1956)
- The Marian McPartland Trio (Capitol, 1956)
- Marian McPartland Trio with Strings: With You in Mind (Capitol, 1957)
- Marian McPartland Trio: At the London House (Argo, 1958)
- Marian McPartland Plays Music of Leonard Bernstein (Time, 1960)
- Jimmy and Marian McPartland Play TV Themes (Design, 1960)
- Marian McPartland: Bossa Nova + Soul (Time, 1963)
- She Swings with Strings (Marian McPartland with the Frank Hunter Orchestra) (Sesac, 1964)
- My Old Flame: Marian McPartland Performs the Classic Hits of Sam Coslow (Dot, 1968)
- Interplay (Halcyon, 1969)
- Elegant Piano: Solos and Duets by Teddy Wilson and Marian McPartland (Halcyon, 1970)
- Marian McPartland: A Delicate Balance (Halcyon, 1972)
- Live at the Monticello: Jimmy and Marian McPartland (Halcyon, 1972)
- Swingin': Marian and Jimmy McPartland and Guests (Halcyon, 1973)
- Marian McPartland: Plays the Music of Alec Wilder (Halcyon, 1974)
- Marian McPartland: Solo Concert at Haverford (Halcyon, 1974)
- Let It Happen (RCA, 1974) as the Jazz Piano Quartet with Dick Hyman, Hank Jones and Roland Hanna
- The Maestro and Friend: Marian McPartland and Joe Venuti (Halcyon, 1974)
- Concert in Argentina: Earl Hines, Teddy Wilson, Marian McPartland, Ellis Larkins (Halcyon, 1974)
- Marian McPartland: Plays the Music of Alec Wilder (Halcyon, 1974)
- Live in Tokyo: Marian McPartland and Hank Jones (TDK, 1976)
- Now's the Time (Halcyon, 1977)
- Tony Bennett, the McPartlands, and Friends Make Magnificent Music (Improv, 1977)
- From This Moment On (Concord, 1978)
- Marian McPartland: Live at the Carlyle (Halcyon, 1979)
- Ambiance (Jazz Alliance, 1970)
- At the Festival (Concord, 1979)
- Portrait of Marian McPartland (Concord, 1980)
- Marian McPartland: At the Festival (Concord, 1980)
- Marian McPartland and George Shearing: Alone Together (Concord, 1982)
- Personal Choice (Concord, 1982)
- Willow Creek and Other Ballads (Concord, 1985)
- Marian McPartland Plays the Music of Billy Strayhorn (Concord, 1987)
- Marian McPartland Plays the Benny Carter Songbook (Concord, 1990)
- Marian McPartland: Live at the Maybeck Recital Hall, Volume Nine (Concord, 1991)
- In My Life (Concord, 1993)
- Marian McPartland Plays the Music of Mary Lou Williams (Concord, 1994)
- Live in Tokyo: Marian McPartland and Hank Jones (Concord, 1994)
- Live at Yoshi's Nitespot (Concord, 1995)
- An NPR Jazz Christmas with Marian McPartland I (1996)
- An NPR Jazz Christmas with Marian McPartland II (1997)
- Marian McPartland with Strings: Silent Pool (Concord, 1997)
- Marian McPartland: Just Friends (Concord, 1998)
- Marian McPartland's Hickory House Trio: Reprise (Concord, 1999)
- Marian McPartland: Portraits (NPR, 1999)
- Marian McPartland: The Single Petal of a Rose, The Essence of Duke Ellington (Concord, 2000)
- Marian McPartland and Willie Pickens: Ain't Misbehavin' – Live at the Jazz Showcase (Concord, 2001)
- Windows (Concord, 2004)
- Marian McPartland Trio with Joe Morello and Rufus Reid – Live in New York (Concord, 2005)
- Marian McPartland & Friends: 85 Candles – Live in New York (Concord, 2005)
- An NPR Jazz Christmas with Marian McPartland III (2007)
- Twilight World (2008)

With Helen Merrill

- Merrill at Midnight (EmArcy, 1957)

== Accolades and honours ==
=== Honorary degrees ===
- Bates College
- Berklee College of Music
- Bowling Green State University
- City University of New York
- Eastman School of Music
- Hamilton College
- Ithaca College
- Union College
- University of South Carolina

=== Other awards ===
- 2007 – National Radio Hall of Fame
- 2006 – Long Island Music Hall of Fame induction
- 2004 – Grammy Trustees Award from the Recording Academy
- 2004 – Sapientia et Doctrina award, from Fordham University, NYC
- 2001 – American Eagle Award from the National Music Council
- 2001 – Gracie Allen Award from the American Women in Radio and Television
- 2000 – NEA Jazz Masters Award
- 2000 – Mary Lou Williams Women in Jazz Award
- 1994 – Down Beat Lifetime Achievement Award
- 1991 – ASCAP-Deems Taylor Award
- 1986 – International Jazz Association of Jazz Education Hall of Fame induction
- 1983 – Peabody Award
