= Booker Little (album) =

Studio album by Booker Little
- Released: 1960
- Recorded: April 13 & 15, 1960
- Genre: Jazz
- Length: 35:15
- Label: Time
- Producer: Irving Joseph

Booker Little chronology
Booker Little 4 and Max Roach (1958)	Booker Little (1960)	Out Front (1961)

Booker Little is an album by American jazz trumpeter Booker Little featuring performances recorded in 1960 for the Time label.

== Reception ==
The Allmusic review by Scott Yanow awarded the album 4½ stars and stated "Trumpeter Booker Little's second session as a leader (there would only be four) is a quartet outing that puts the emphasis on relaxed tempoes. Little's immediately recognizable melancholy sound and lyrical style are heard in top form".

Professional ratings
Review scores
Source	Rating
Allmusic	4.5/5 stars
The Rolling Stone Jazz Record Guide	4/5 stars
The Penguin Guide to Jazz Recordings	3.5/4 stars

== Track listing ==
All compositions, and all sessions led, by Booker Little except as indicated

1. "Opening Statement" – 6:42
2. "Minor Sweet" – 5:38
3. "Bee Tee's Minor Plea" – 5:40
4. "Life's a Little Blue" – 6:53
5. "The Grand Valse" – 4:57
6. "Who Can I Turn To?" (Alec Wilder, William Engvick) – 5:25

The following tracks appear in some CD reissues, and do not include the same personnel as the original session and LP. Most CD reissues keep the original LP format.

7. "My Old Flame" [take 1 stereo] (Sam Coslow, Arthur Johnston) – 3:34 (Max Roach Quartet)
8. "My Old Flame" [take 2 mono] (Coslow, Johnston) – 3:38 (Max Roach Quartet)
9. "Sweet and Lovely" (Gus Arnheim, Jules LeMare, Harry Tobias) – 4:14
10. "Moonlight Becomes You" (Johnny Burke, Jimmy Van Heusen) – 5:41
11. "Blues De Tambour" (Ed Shaughnessy) – 3:39 (Teddy Charles Sextet)
12. "Tune Up" (Miles Davis) – 5:21 (Max Roach New Quintet)
- Recorded in Chicago in June 1958 (tracks 7 & 8), at the Newport Jazz Festival, Rhode Island on July 6, 1958 (track 12), and in New York City in October 1958 (tracks 9 & 10), April 13, 1960 (tracks 1, 2, 5 & 6) April 15, 1960 (tracks 3 & 4), and August 25, 1960 (track 11).

== Personnel ==
- Booker Little – trumpet
- Tommy Flanagan (tracks 1, 2, 5, 6), Wynton Kelly (tracks 3 & 4) – piano
- Scott LaFaro (tracks 1–6) – bass
- Roy Haynes (tracks 1–6) – drums

Additional tracks on later CD reissues:

- George Coleman (tracks 7–10 & 12) – tenor sax
- Ray Draper (tracks 9, 10 & 12) – tuba
- Eddie Baker (tracks 7 & 8), Tommy Flanagan (tracks 9 & 10), Mal Waldron (track 11) – piano
- Bob Cranshaw (tracks 7 & 8), Art Davis (tracks 9, 10 & 12), Addison Farmer (track 11) – bass
- Max Roach (tracks 7–10 & 12), Ed Shaughnessy (track 11) – drums
