= Alone Together: The Best of the Mercury Years =

Compilation album by Clifford Brown and Max Roach
- Released: January 24, 1995
- Recorded: August 3, 1954 – October 1960
- Genre: Jazz
- Length: 148:45
- Label: Verve; 526373-2
- Producer: Bob Shad

Alone Together: The Best of the Mercury Years is a compilation album featuring recordings by trumpeter Clifford Brown and drummer Max Roach in groups together and separately which were originally released on Mercury and subsidiary labels.

== Reception ==
Professional ratings
Review scores
Source	Rating
Allmusic	5/5 stars
Penguin Guide to Jazz	4/4 stars

Allmusic's John Bush noted "Verve's two-disc collection of the best recordings from the Clifford Brown-Max Roach Quintet recorded for Mercury/Emarcy between 1954 and 1956 includes a parade of Brown-Roach classics ...The second disc, which doesn't include Brown at all, reels through a highlight film of Max Roach's varied quintets of the late '50s after the death of Brown in 1956. Of course, Roach's sessions during that time feature many great recordings – trumpeter Booker Little is a competent replacement for Brown, and tenors Sonny Rollins, Hank Mobley, and Stanley Turrentine all have great spots – but record buyers expecting this set to live up to its title might be disappointed". The Penguin Guide to Jazz selected this album as part of its suggested Core Collection.

== Track listing ==
Disc one

1. "Cherokee" (Ray Noble) – 5:43
2. "Joy Spring" (Clifford Brown) – 6:51
3. "What's New?" (Bob Haggart, Johnny Burke) – 3:25
4. "Mildama" (Max Roach) – 4:32
5. "September Song" (Kurt Weill, Maxwell Anderson) – 5:46
6. "What Am I Here For?" (Duke Ellington, Frankie Laine) – 3:09
7. "Sandu" (Brown) – 4:55
8. "Daahoud" (Brown) – 4:02
9. "Born to Be Blue" (Robert Wells, Mel Tormé) – 5:15
10. "Jordu" (Duke Jordan) – 7:46
11. "Gertrude's Bounce" (Richie Powell) – 4:10
12. "Stardust" (Hoagy Carmichael, Mitchell Parish) – 3:24
13. "Parisian Thoroughfare" (Bud Powell) – 7:19
14. "Blues Walk" (Brown) – 6:46

Disc two

1. "Dr. Free-Zee" (Roach) – 2:07
2. "Just One of Those Things" (Cole Porter) – 7:21
3. "Valse Hot" (Sonny Rollins) – 14:28
4. "Tune-Up" (Eddie Vinson) – 7:46
5. "Yardbird Suite" (Charlie Parker) – 3:54
6. "A Night in Tunisia" (Dizzy Gillespie, Frank Paparelli) – 8:15
7. "La Villa" (Kenny Dorham) – 6:17
8. "Max's Variations" (Harold Farberman) – 2:20
9. "Prelude" (Consuela Lee) – 5:08
10. "Juliano" (Julian Priester) – 5:43
11. "Lotus Blossom" (Arthur Johnston, Sam Coslow) – 5:34
12. "The Left Bank" (Brown) – 3:17
13. "Never Leave Me" (Gordon Jenkins) – 6:49

== Personnel ==
- Max Roach – drums (All tracks except Disc One: tracks 5 & 9)
- Clifford Brown (Disc One), Kenny Dorham (Disc Two: tracks 1–5), Booker Little (Disc Two: tracks 6, 7 & 9), Tommy Turrentine (Disc two: tracks 10–13) – trumpet
- Julian Priester – trombone (Disc Two: tracks 9–13)
- Ray Draper – tuba (Disc Two: tracks 6 & 7)
- Herbie Mann – flute (Disc One: track 5)
- George Coleman (Disc Two: tracks 6, 7 & 9), Harold Land (Disc One: tracks: 1–2, 4, 6–8, 10 & 13–14), Hank Mobley (Disc Two: tracks 4 & 5), Paul Quinichette (Disc One: track 5), Sonny Rollins (Disc One: track 11, Disc Two: tracks 1–3), Stanley Turrentine (Disc Two: tracks 10–13) – tenor saxophone
- Danny Banks – baritone saxophone (Disc One: track 9)
- Barry Galbraith (Disc One: tracks 3, 9 & 12) – guitar
- Ray Bryant (Disc Two: tracks 1, 2 & 13), Jimmy Jones (Disc One: tracks 5 & 9), Richie Powell (Disc One: tracks 1–4, 6–8 & 10), Bill Wallace (Disc Two: track 3) – piano
- Joe Benjamin (Disc One: track 5), Bob Boswell (Disc Two: tracks 10–13), Nelson Boyd (Disc Two: track 5), Art Davis (Disc Two: tracks 6, 7 & 9), Milt Hinton (Disc One: track 9), George Morrow (Disc One: tracks 1–4, 6–8 & 10–14, Disc Two: tracks 1–4) – bass
- Roy Haynes (Disc One: track 5), Osie Johnson (Disc One: track 9) – drums
- The Boston Percussion Ensemble – percussion (Disc Two: track 8)
- Abbey Lincoln (Disc Two: track 13), Helen Merrill (Disc One: track 9), Sarah Vaughan (Disc One: track 5) – vocals
- Unidentified string section (Disc One: tracks 3 & 12)
- Irving Faberman (Disc Two: track 8), Neil Hefti (Disc One: tracks 3 & 12), Quincy Jones (Disc One: track 9), Ernie Wilkins (Disc One: track 5) – arranger and conductor
