= Booker Little 4 and Max Roach =

Studio album by Booker Little
- Released: 1959
- Recorded: October 1958
- Genre: Jazz
- Length: 50:40
- Label: United Artists

Booker Little chronology
Booker Little 4 and Max Roach (1959)	Booker Little (1960)

Booker Little 4 and Max Roach (also released as The Defiant Ones) is an album by American jazz trumpeter Booker Little featuring performances recorded in 1958 (and 1959 on the CD reissue) for the United Artists label.

== Reception ==
The AllMusic review by Scott Yanow stated: "Overall, this forward-looking hard bop set is easily recommended".

Professional ratings
Review scores
Source	Rating
AllMusic	4.5/5 stars
DownBeat	3/5 stars
The Penguin Guide to Jazz Recordings	3/4 stars
Tom Hull	B+

== Track listing ==
All compositions by Booker Little except as indicated

1. "Milestones" (John Lewis) – 5:33
2. "Sweet and Lovely" (Gus Arnheim, Jules LeMare, Harry Tobias) – 4:13
3. "Rounder's Mood" – 5:19
4. "Dungeon Waltz" – 4:27
5. "Jewel's Tempo" – 6:35
6. "Moonlight Becomes You" (Johnny Burke, Jimmy Van Heusen) – 5:40
7. "Things Ain't What They Used to Be" (Mercer Ellington) – 10:44
8. "Blue 'n' Boogie" (Dizzy Gillespie, Frank Paparelli) – 8:09

Recorded in New York City in October 1958 (at Nola Penthouse Studios, #1–6) and January 30, 1959 (#7–8, some sources suggest Olmsted Sound Studios, NYC, April 15, 1959).

== Personnel ==
On #1–6

- Booker Little – trumpet
- George Coleman – tenor saxophone
- Tommy Flanagan – piano
- Art Davis – bass
- Max Roach – drums

Originally released as United Artists UAL4034 (mono)/UAS5034 (stereo).

On #7–8 (1991 Blue Note CD reissue only)

- Booker Little, Louis Smith – trumpets
- Frank Strozier – alto saxophone
- George Coleman – tenor saxophone
- Phineas Newborn – piano
- Calvin Newborn – guitar
- George Joyner – bass
- Charles Crosby – drums

Originally released as by Young Men From Memphis on Down Home Reunion, United Artists UAL4029 (mono)/UAS5029 (stereo).
