= Here and There (Eric Dolphy album) =

Live album by Eric Dolphy
- Released: May 1966
- Recorded: Tracks 1 and 2 on July 16, 1961; Five Spot, New York City; Tracks 3 and 4 on April 1, 1960; Van Gelder Studio, Englewood Cliffs; Track 5 on September 6, 1961; Berlingske Hus, Copenhagen
- Length: 46:15
- Labels: Prestige; PRLP 7382
- Producer: Esmond Edwards

Eric Dolphy chronology
Last Date (1965)	Here and There (1966)	Iron Man (1968)

Here and There is a jazz album by multi-instrumentalist Eric Dolphy. It was originally released in 1966 on the Prestige label as PRLP 7382. It contains tracks recorded on three separate dates, in different locations. Mal Waldron's "Status Seeking" and Dolphy's solo bass clarinet version of Billie Holiday's "God Bless the Child" were recorded on July 16, 1961, at the Five Spot in New York City as part of the concert that was documented on the At the Five Spot recordings. (This version of "God Bless the Child" was Dolphy's first recorded performance of the tune.) "April Fool" and "G.W. (Take 1)" were recorded on April 1, 1960, at Van Gelder Studio in Englewood Cliffs, New Jersey as part of the session that yielded Outward Bound, Dolphy's first album as a leader. ("G.W. (Take 1)" is an alternate take of the first track on Outward Bound. It previously appeared on Dash One, and was not part of the original LP issue of Here and There. "G.W." is dedicated to the Californian bandleader Gerald Wilson.) "Don't Blame Me" was recorded on September 6, 1961, in Berlingske Has, Copenhagen, Denmark during Dolphy's second European tour, as part of the sessions that produced Eric Dolphy in Europe Volumes 1–3.

== Reception ==
Professional ratings
Review scores
Source	Rating
AllMusic	4/5 stars
MusicHound Jazz	4.5/5 stars
The Penguin Guide to Jazz Recordings	3/4 stars
The Rolling Stone Jazz Record Guide	4/5 stars

In a review for AllMusic, Scott Yanow wrote: "Although it is easy to think of this set on a whole as containing 'leftovers,' Dolphy's strong playing on alto, flute and bass clarinet makes the music of strong interest to his fans."

== Track listing ==
1. "Status Seeking" (Waldron) – 13:08
2. "God Bless the Child" (Billie Holiday/Arthur Herzog Jr.) – 5:16
3. "April Fool" (Dolphy) – 4:10
4. "G.W." [Take 1] (Dolphy) – 12:11
5. "Don't Blame Me" (Jimmy McHugh/Dorothy Fields) – 13:07

== Personnel ==
- Eric Dolphy – alto sax (tracks 1, 4), bass clarinet (2), flute (3, 5)
- Mal Waldron – piano (1)
- Booker Little – trumpet (1)
- Eddie Blackwell – drums (1)
- Richard Davis – double bass (1)
- Roy Haynes – drums (3, 4)
- Freddie Hubbard – trumpet (4)
- George Tucker – double bass (3, 4)
- Jaki Byard – piano (3, 4)
- Bent Axen – piano (5)
- Erik Moseholm – double bass (5)
- Jorn Elniff – drums (5)
