= Deeds, Not Words =

Studio album by Max Roach Quintet
- Released: 1958
- Recorded: September 4, 1958; New York City
- Genre: Jazz
- Length: 43:27
- Labels: Riverside; RLP 12-280
- Producer: Orrin Keepnews

Max Roach chronology
Max Roach with the Boston Percussion Ensemble (1958)	Deeds, Not Words (1958)	Award-Winning Drummer (1958)

Deeds, Not Words is an album by American jazz drummer Max Roach featuring tracks recorded in 1958 and released on the Riverside label.

== Reception ==
Professional ratings
Review scores
Source	Rating
Allmusic	4.5/5 stars
The Penguin Guide to Jazz Recordings	4/4 stars

Allmusic awarded the album 4½ stars, stating: "This is fine music from a group that was trying to stretch themselves beyond hard bop".

== Track listing ==
1. "You Stepped Out of a Dream" (Nacio Herb Brown, Gus Kahn) - 7:46
2. "Filidé" (Ray Draper) - 7:06
3. "It's You or No One" (Sammy Cahn, Jule Styne) - 4:14
4. "Jodie's Cha-Cha" (Bill Lee) - 4:56
5. "Deeds, Not Words" (Lee) - 4:34
6. "Larry-Larue" (Booker Little) - 5:13
7. "Conversation" (Max Roach) - 3:48
8. "There Will Never Be Another You" (Mack Gordon, Harry Warren) - 5:50

Track 8 with Oscar Pettiford is a CD bonus track recorded at the sessions for Sonny Rollins' Freedom Suite.

== Personnel ==
- Max Roach - drums
- Booker Little - trumpet (tracks: 1 to 6)
- Ray Draper - tuba (tracks: 1 to 6)
- George Coleman - tenor saxophone (tracks: 1 to 6)
- Art Davis - bass (tracks: 1 to 6)
- Oscar Pettiford - bass (track: 8)
