= Dash One =

Studio album by Eric Dolphy
- Released: 1982
- Recorded: April 1, 1960, December 21, 1960, and July 16, 1961
- Studio: Van Gelder Studio, Englewood Cliffs, New Jersey
- Genre: Jazz
- Label: Prestige Records; MPP-2517
- Producer: Esmond Edwards

Dash One is an album by Eric Dolphy consisting of alternate takes of four pieces recorded for other albums.

"G.W." and "245" were recorded on April 1, 1960, during the Outward Bound session. "Serene" was recorded on December 21, 1960, during the Far Cry session. "Bee Vamp," recorded on July 16, 1961, during the concert for the live album At the Five Spot. The album was released in 1982 by Prestige Records.

== Reception ==
Professional ratings
Review scores
Source	Rating
AllMusic	4/5 stars

In a review for AllMusic, Scott Yanow wrote: "This LP contains four rare items by Eric Dolphy, alternate takes of 'G.W.,' '245,' 'Bee Vamp' and 'Serene.' The first two selections also feature trumpeter Freddie Hubbard while Booker Little provides the brass on the latter two songs. Needless to say, Dolphy (heard here on alto and bass clarinet) takes completely different improvisations than on the originally released recordings, making this a valuable addition to his discography."

A reviewer for JazzTimes stated: "Dash One is as much an invaluable document for the Dolphy scholar and student as it is an excellent buy for the price-conscious general listener."

Coda's Gerard Futrick called the music "vital and essential," and commented: "Here one has the opportunity to witness the creative process in action; the improvising musician attempting to bring his craft to the ultimate level of perfection... It is a must for any serious student of the art form we refer to as jazz and a valuable addition to the already rich recorded legacy of Eric Dolphy."

== Track listing ==
1. "G.W." (Dolphy) – 12:07
2. "245" (Dolphy) – 7:54
3. "Bee Vamp" (Booker Little) – 9:33
4. "Serene" (Dolphy) – 6:38

== Personnel ==
- Eric Dolphy – alto saxophone, bass clarinet, flute
- Freddie Hubbard – trumpet (tracks 1 and 2)
- Booker Little – trumpet (tracks 3 and 4),
- Jaki Byard – piano (tracks 1, 2, and 4)
- Mal Waldron – piano (track 3)
- George Tucker – bass (tracks 1 and 2)
- Richard Davis – bass (track 3)
- Ron Carter – bass (track 4)
- Roy Haynes – drums (tracks 1, 2, and 4)
- Ed Blackwell – drums (track 3)
