= Long Night (album) =

Studio album by Frank Strozier
- Released: 1961
- Recorded: September 12, 1961; Plaza Sound Studios, New York City
- Genre: Jazz
- Length: 39:07
- Label: Jazzland; JLP 56
- Producer: Orrin Keepnews

Frank Strozier chronology
Fantastic Frank Strozier (1960)	Long Night (1961)	March of the Siamese Children (1962)

Professional ratings
Review scores
Source	Rating
AllMusic	4/5 stars
Down Beat	3.5/5 stars

Long Night is an album by jazz musician Frank Strozier, recorded in 1961 for Jazzland.

== Reception ==
In a review for the August 16, 1962 issue of Down Beat magazine jazz critic Pete Welding wrote: "Strozier's writing for the sextet numbers is spare and attractive: he has avoided the temptation to keep three horns going all the time and uses the tenor and baritone for effective ensemble accents."

== Track listing ==
1. "Long Night" (Strozier) – 4:34
2. "How Little We Know" (Leigh, Philip Springer) – 5:57
3. "The Need for Love" (Strozier) – 4:40
4. "The Man That Got Away" (Arlen, Gershwin) – 4:19
5. "Happiness Is a Thing Called Joe" (Arlen, Harburg) – 5:57
6. "The Crystal Ball" (Strozier) – 5:33
7. "Pacemaker" (Strozier) – 4:05
8. "Just Think It Over" (Strozier) – 4:02

== Personnel ==
- Frank Strozier – alto sax, flute (6)
- George Coleman – tenor sax (1, 3, 6, 8)
- Pat Patrick – baritone sax (1, 3, 8), flute (6)
- Chris Anderson – piano
- Bill Lee – bass
- Walter Perkins – drums
