= MJT + 3 =

Studio album by MJT + 3
- Released: 1961
- Recorded: May 12, 1960; Universal Recorders, Chicago
- Genre: Jazz
- Length: 35:41
- Label: Vee-Jay; VJLP 3014
- Producer: Sid McCoy

Professional ratings
Review scores
| Source | Rating |
|---|---|
| Allmusic | 4/5 stars |

MJT + 3 is an album by MJT + 3, recorded in 1960 for Vee-Jay Records.

== Track listing ==
1. "Branching Out" (Mabern) - 6:57
2. "Lil' Abner" (Willie Thomas) - 4:10
3. "Don't Ever Throw My Love Away" (Strozier) - 9:08
4. "Raggity Man" (Thomas) - 6:29
5. "To Sheila" (Strozier) - 4:57
6. "Love for Sale" (Porter) - 4:00

== Personnel ==
- Frank Strozier - alto sax, flute
- Willie Thomas - trumpet
- Harold Mabern - piano
- Bob Cranshaw - bass
- Walter Perkins - drums
