= Parisian Sketches =

Studio album by Max Roach
- Released: 1960
- Recorded: March 1–2, 1960
- Studio: Barclay Studios, Paris, France
- Genre: Jazz
- Length: 35:57
- Label: Mercury; MG 20491

Max Roach chronology
Long as You're Living (1960)	Parisian Sketches (1960)	We Insist! (1961)

Professional ratings
Review scores
Source	Rating
Down Beat	4/5 stars
Allmusic	3/5 stars

Parisian Sketches is an album by American jazz drummer Max Roach recorded in Paris in 1960 and released on the Mercury label.

== Track listing ==
All compositions by Max Roach except as indicated

1. "Parisian Sketches: The Tower/The Champs/The Caves/The Left Bank/The Arch" - 17:13
2. "Nica" (Sonny Clark) - 4:48
3. "Petit Déjeuner" (Julian Priester) - 4:06
4. "Un Nouveau Complet" (Tommy Turrentine) - 3:25
5. "Liberte" - 6:25
- Recorded at Barclay Studios, Paris, France on March 1, 1960 (tracks 1, 3 & 4), and March 2, 1960 (tracks 2 & 5)

== Personnel ==
- Max Roach - drums
- Tommy Turrentine - trumpet
- Julian Priester - trombone
- Stanley Turrentine - tenor saxophone
- Bob Boswell - bass
