= Out Front (Booker Little album) =

Studio album by Booker Little
- Released: October 1961
- Recorded: March 17 & April 4, 1961
- Genre: Jazz
- Length: 43:33
- Label: Candid
- Producer: Nat Hentoff

Booker Little chronology
Booker Little (1960)	Out Front (1961)	Booker Little and Friend (1961)

Out Front is a 1961 album by American jazz trumpeter Booker Little featuring performances recorded and released by the Candid label.

== Reception ==
Professional ratings
Review scores
Source	Rating
AllMusic	5/5 stars
The Rolling Stone Jazz Record Guide	5/5 stars
The Penguin Guide to Jazz Recordings	3.5/4 stars
Pitchfork	9.3/10

The AllMusic review by Scott Yanow stated "His seven now-obscure originals (several of which deserve to be revived) are challenging for the soloists and there are many strong moments during these consistently challenging and satisfying performances".

== Track listing ==
All compositions by Booker Little

1. "We Speak" – 6:47
2. "Strength and Sanity" – 6:18
3. "Quiet Please" – 8:11
4. "Moods in Free Time" – 5:45
5. "Man of Words" – 4:52
6. "Hazy Hues" – 6:42
7. "A New Day" – 5:31

*Recorded at Nola's Penthouse Sound Studios in New York City on March 17, 1961 (tracks 1, 3 and 7) and April 4, 1961 (tracks 2 & 4–6).

== Personnel ==
- Booker Little – trumpet
- Julian Priester – trombone
- Eric Dolphy – alto saxophone, bass clarinet, flute
- Don Friedman – piano
- Art Davis (tracks 1, 3 & 7), Ron Carter (tracks 2 and 4–6) – bass
- Max Roach – drums, timpani, vibraphone
