= Award-Winning Drummer =

Studio album by Max Roach
- Released: 1960
- Recorded: November 4, 1958; Capitol Studios, New York City
- Genre: Jazz
- Label: Time; T/70003
- Producer: Bob Shad

Max Roach chronology
Deeds, Not Words (1958)	Award-Winning Drummer (1960)	The Many Sides of Max (1959)

Award-Winning Drummer (also released as Max Roach) is an album by American jazz drummer Max Roach featuring a session recorded in 1958 and released on the Time label.

== Reception ==
Professional ratings
Review scores
Source	Rating
AllMusic	3/5 stars
DownBeat	3.5/5 stars
Tom Hull	B+

Allmusic reviewer Ron Wynn stated the group was "among the finest hard bop ensembles around".

== Track listing ==
All compositions by Max Roach, except as indicated,

1. "Tuba de Nod" — 3:56
2. "Milano" (John Lewis) — 5:09
3. "Variations on the Scene" (George Coleman) — 5:37
4. "Pies of Quincy" — 3:19
5. "Old Folks" (Dedette Lee Hill, Willard Robison) — 4:16
6. "Sadiga" (Coleman) — 6:31
7. "Gandolfo's Bounce" (Booker Little) — 5:38
8. "Milano" [alternate take] (Lewis) — 6:33 bonus track on iTunes release
9. "Old Folks" [alternate take] (Hill, Robison) — 4:31 bonus track on iTunes release
10. "Gandolfo's Bounce" [alternate take] (Little) — 6:12 bonus track on iTunes release

== Personnel ==
- Max Roach — drums
- Booker Little — trumpet
- George Coleman — tenor saxophone
- Ray Draper — tuba
- Art Davis — bass
