= Booker Little and Friend =

Studio album by Booker Little
- Released: 1961
- Recorded: Summer 1961
- Genre: Jazz
- Length: 48:22
- Label: Bethlehem
- Producer: Teddy Charles

Booker Little chronology
| Out Front (1961) | Booker Little and Friend (1961) |

Booker Little and Friend is the final album led by American jazz trumpeter Booker Little featuring performances recorded in 1961 for the Bethlehem label. It was reissued under the title Victory and Sorrow in the vinyl era. The CD reissue added two previously released alternate takes.

== Reception ==
The Allmusic review by Scott Yanow awarded the album 4½ stars and stated: "Booker Little is generally the top soloist on the harmonically advanced hard bop date and he is in peak form throughout".

Professional ratings
Review scores
| Source | Rating |
|---|---|
| Allmusic | 4.5/5 stars |
| The Rolling Stone Jazz Record Guide | 4/5 stars |
| The Penguin Guide to Jazz Recordings | 4/4 stars |

== Track listing ==
All compositions by Booker Little except as indicated

1. "Victory and Sorrow" – 5:56
2. "Forward Flight" – 6:18
3. "Looking Ahead" – 7:25
4. "If I Should Lose You" (Ralph Rainger, Leo Robin) – 5:11
5. "Calling Softly" – 5:39
6. "Booker's Blues" – 5:16
7. "Matilde" – 5:55
8. "Looking Ahead" [alternate take 4] – 8:27 Bonus track on CD reissue
9. "Looking Ahead" [alternate take 7] – 8:15 Bonus track on CD reissue

*Recorded in New York City, Summer 1961.

== Personnel ==
- Booker Little – trumpet
- Julian Priester – trombone (tracks 1–3 & 5–9)
- George Coleman – tenor saxophone (tracks 1–3 & 5–9)
- Don Friedman – piano
- Reggie Workman – bass
- Pete LaRoca – drums
