= We Insist! =

1960 studio album by Max Roach

Studio album by Max Roach
- Released: January 1961
- Recorded: August 31 & September 6, 1960
- Studio: Nola Penthouse Sound Studio, New York City
- Genre: Avant-garde jazz
- Length: 37:17
- Label: Candid
- Producer: Nat Hentoff

Max Roach chronology
Parisian Sketches (1960)	We Insist! (1961)	Percussion Bitter Sweet (1961)

We Insist! (subtitled Max Roach's Freedom Now Suite) is an album by the jazz drummer and composer Max Roach which was released in January 1961 through Candid Records. It consists of a suite that Roach and lyricist Oscar Brown had begun to develop in 1959 with a view to its performance in 1963 on the centennial of the Emancipation Proclamation. The cover references the sit-in movement of the Civil Rights Movement. The Penguin Guide to Jazz awarded the album one of its rare crown accolades, in addition to featuring it as part of its Core Collection.

The music consists of five selections concerning the Emancipation Proclamation and the growing African independence movements of the 1950s. Only Roach and vocalist Abbey Lincoln perform on all five tracks, and one track features a guest appearance by saxophonist Coleman Hawkins.

In 2022, the album was selected by the Library of Congress for preservation in the United States National Recording Registry as being "culturally, historically, or aesthetically significant".

Professional ratings
Review scores
Source	Rating
The Guardian	4/5 stars
The Penguin Guide to Jazz Recordings	4/4 stars
Allmusic	5/5 stars

== Composition ==
We Insist! is an avant-garde jazz album and a vocal-instrumental suite on themes related to the Civil Rights Movement. It incorporates aspects of avant-garde trends during the 1960s, including the use of a pianoless ensemble, screaming vocals on "Protest", and moments of collective improvisation, such as at the end of "Tears for Johannesburg". Max Roach collaborated with lyricist Oscar Brown Jr. on the album and wrote songs that played variations on the theme of the struggle for African Americans to achieve equality in the United States. Abbey Lincoln, a frequent collaborator and subsequent wife of Roach's, performed vocals on the album. While Brown's lyrics were verbal, Lincoln sang wordless vocals on her parts.

Brown and Roach began collaborating in 1959 on a longer piece that they planned to perform at the centennial of the Emancipation Proclamation in 1963. However, the urgency of civil rights issues steered them towards a new project in 1960 – the album that would become the Freedom Now Suite. This urgency was sparked by the Greensboro sit-ins at a lunch counter in Greensboro, North Carolina, and the rapidly spreading momentum of the civil rights movement aided by the Southern Christian Leadership Conference (SCLC) and Congress of Racial Equality (CORE).

During the composition of the album, Roach lived in New York and Brown in Chicago, and Brown recalls that "we did it on the road kind of; we really wrote it by telephone." From this came tensions between the two composers about the political content of the article and especially about how the album should end. The pair continued arguing throughout the composition, and eventually Brown backed out. Monson wrote that "Brown did not know about the Freedom Now Suite recording until he received a postcard from Nat Hentoff requesting biographical material to be included in the liner notes to the album. Brown was disappointed that the music from their collaboration had been rearranged without his knowledge to serve Max Roach's political vision." Specifically, Brown did not like the screaming section of "Protest" in the track "Triptych". Although both Brown and Roach agreed on issues of social justice, they disagreed on the vehicles with which to express this.

In the LP's liner notes, Hentoff writes: "During the same period, there was also increasing press coverage of the emerging, newly independent nations of Africa. Negro students in the south had been particularly aware of the impetus to their own campaigns for freedom given by the African examples because of the presence of African students on their campuses. Jazzmen too had been becoming conscious and prideful of the African wave of independence."

=== "Driva' Man" ===
Written by Max Roach and Oscar Brown, "Driva Man" tells the explicit story of slavery through its lyrics and accompaniment. Nat Hentoff, who was present at the recording sessions of the album, wrote that the Driva' Man "is a personification of the white overseer in slavery times who often forced women under his jurisdiction into sexual relations." Also in the lyrics are "pater ollers". Hentoff in his liner notes includes a description of the patrollers by a former slave, who says they are men "who would catch you from home and wear you out and send you back to your master....Most of them there patrollers was poor white folks....Poor white folks had to hustle round to make a living, so they hired out theirselves to slaveowners and rode the roads at night and whipped you if they catched you off their plantation without a pass."

This track uses several tactics to evoke its images of slavery. Alisa White describes how the 5/4 time signature of the track adds an intense percussive hit, played either by a tambourine or as a rimshot, on the first beat of each measure. The track does not deviate from this pattern, which White wrote, "conjures up images of forced labor", specifically a cracked whip. Additionally, the track is played in a blues form that is only six bars long, however this is found in pairs, so that each chorus is actually 12 bars long. Abbey Lincoln is the first to enter the tune, singing the melody a cappella and accompanying herself with tambourine. Coleman Hawkins then enters with the tenor saxophone melody, along with the three horns supporting him. After a chorus of instrumental melody, Hawkins takes a four-chorus solo. All the while, Roach maintains the unusual 5/4 time signature with the punching hit on the first beat of each measure. Melodically, "Driva' Man" is the simplest tune on the album, based in a C-minor pentatonic scale.

Coleman Hawkins makes an appearance here and "plays the male counterpart to Abbey Lincoln", as Hentoff notes in his liner notes. Hawkins would stay far past his part in the recording, and he would turn to Max Roach in astonishment, asking: "Did you really write this, Max?" In his liner notes, Hentoff wrote of an interaction between Hawkins and Abbey Lincoln after a squeak in Lincoln's opening solo in "Driva' Man": "No, don't splice," said Hawkins. "When it's all perfect, especially in a piece like this, there's something very wrong."

=== "Freedom Day" ===
The second track on the album is "Freedom Day," a track that is an extension from the slavery-driven "Driva' Man". This track is a response to Emancipation, which became official law in 1865. This track was also written and arranged by Max Roach.

Although the track is titled Freedom Day, Max Roach confessed to Ingrid Monson "we could never finish it", because freedom itself was so hard to grasp: "we don't really understand what it really is to be free. The last sound we did, 'Freedom Day,' ended with a question mark." This tension between expectancy and disbelief is also mirrored in the musical technique of the track. Hentoff wrote: "'Freedom Day' manages to capture both the anticipation and anxiety of the moment of Emancipation by setting its minor-blue solos over a feverishly paced rhythm section." The conflicting layering of the instruments in the track help to express this conflict of belief in the piece.

Hentoff wrote that Lincoln's vocal performance is bursting with impatience, reflecting the anticipation that the track inhabits. Although this track is the most highly arranged tune on the album and the melody is simple, the rhythms of Lincoln's vocal lines do not match the accent patterns created by the rhythm section. This track also switched textures frequently, moving quickly from an opening of horn voicings to Lincoln's vocals, followed by the introduction of a new horn melody, consecutive horn solos, and a drum solo. In his liner notes, Hentoff includes the instrumental solos played by Booker Little on trumpet, Walter Benton on tenor saxophone, Julian Priester on trombone, and Max Roach on drums.

=== "Triptych: Prayer, Protest, Peace" ===
"Triptych" is the third, and the middle, track of the album. The track is split into three sections, "Prayer", "Protest", and "Peace". According to Hentoff's liner notes, the piece was originally composed to be a part of a ballet, in which the majority of the choreography would be improvisation. This track links the histories of slavery in America to the struggles of bondage and freedom in South Africa, on which the two tracks following "Triptych" ("All Africa" and "Tears for Johannesburg") will focus. This climactic track is a dynamic duet between Abbey Lincoln and Max Roach that moves through wordless vocals and percussion in "Prayer", to Lincoln's screaming section in "Protest", and finally back to "Peace". In the liner notes Nat Hentoff wrote that "Triptcyh" is a "final, uncontrollable unleashing of rage and anger that have been compressed in fear for so long that the only catharsis can be the extremely painful tearing out of all the accumulating fury...."

The first section, "Prayer", exposes "Abbey Lincoln at her most haunting, as she slowly builds from low to high in call and response with Roach's drums, which are tuned to match the tonality of Lincoln's voice." Lincoln's low moan signifies "the cry of the oppressed people, any and all oppressed peoples of whatever color or combination of colors." the second section of the track, "Protest", proves the most avant-garde of the three sections, most signified by Abbey Lincoln's one minute and twenty seconds of screaming, accompanied by Max Roach on drums.

"Lincoln recalls that it was Max Roach's idea, not hers, to include the screaming: 'It wasn't an approach to music that I would have chosen, but because I thought of him as a teacher–he preceded me–I did what I could to please him.' Lincoln, whose voice throughout is the vibrant carrier of the message, took greater heat for that message than Roach."

The "Protest" section of the album took the most heat out of any part of the album because of its explicit political message. Critics reviewed this section as an explicit rejection of Martin Luther King's nonviolent protest philosophy with a very clear take-away message from Max Roach. The final section of Triptych, "Peace", brings the tone of the track to a different place.

"Peace", as Max explained to Abbey before the take, "is the feeling of relaxed exhaustion after you've done everything you can to assert yourself. You can rest now because you've worked to be free. It's a realistic feeling of peacefulness. You know what you've been through."

"Peace" provides the first time in the track when Max Roach plays a steady rhythm behind Lincoln, whose vocal part transitions from scatting into a guttural tone and finishes with an exhaustive exhale. "If this is Peace, it is peace with gothic undertones, as if ghosts of the past might be appeased for a moment but never exorcised in their entirety."

=== "All Africa" ===
The fourth track of the album, "All Africa", moves the album into the topics of civil rights in Africa, beginning with a celebration of African nationalism. Nigerian drummer Babatunde Olatunji, a primary force in popularizing African drumming in America, plays the drums in "All Africa". In the introduction of All Africa, Olatunji accompanies Abbey Lincoln with polyrhythmic beat and direction

Along with the new personnel on this track, including Afro-Cuban players Mantillo and DuVal, a new percussion ensemble, rhythmic ostinatos, and open-ended modal frameworks are added to point the listener more specifically to its African, Cuban, and Caribbean influences. Furthermore, Monson adds, "an African diasporic sensibility is musically enacted in the extended percussion solo that follows the recitation through the use of a well-known seven bell pattern that is found not only in West Africa but also in the sacred music of the Caribbean and Brazil."

Abbey Lincoln adds to this African influence with her vocal part, which begins with the recitation of the names of various African tribes. Throughout the three choruses of the piece, Lincoln chants the names of African tribes amidst Olatunji's responses with freedom sayings of his tribe. The second half of "All Africa" is filled with an extensive percussion solo that leads into the final track, Tears for Johannesburg.

=== "Tears for Johannesburg" ===
The fifth and final track of the album, "Tears for Johannesburg", continues the album's focus on civil rights issues in Africa. "Tears for Johannesburg" was a response to the Sharpeville massacre in South Africa in 1960, the same year that the Freedom Now Suite was recorded. San Francisco Examiner reviewer C.H. Garrigues called it a "beautiful and moving dirge".

Hentoff's liner notes continue:

Tears for Johannesburg sums up, in large sense, what the players and singers of the album are trying to communicate. There is still an incredible and bloody cruelty against African Americans, as in the Sharpeville massacres of South Africa. There is still much to be won in America. But, as the soloists indicate after Abbey's wounding threnody, there will be no stopping the grasp for freedom everywhere.

Drummer Olatunji continues his presence in this track. Musically, Monson wrote, "Tears for Johannesburg has inverted the usual order of melody and embellishment, presenting paraphrased versions of the composition first, the most direct statement of the melody last." Although there is a set chorus structure for this track, it sounds open and free In order, solos are played by Booker Little, Walter Benton, Julian Priester, and the drummers. Alisa White wrote, "just as Driva' Man sets the stage for the album, Tears for Johannesburg sums it up. The 5/4 time returns and wordless vocals express emotions too complex to be put into words."

== Reception and legacy ==
On its release in January 1961, We Insist! was not a commercial success and received mixed reviews from contemporary music critics. Many praised the album's ambitious concept, but some critics found it to be too controversial. Nonetheless, Roach vowed after its release that he would never again play music that is not socially relevant and told Down Beat magazine, "We American jazz musicians of African descent have proved beyond all doubt that we’re master musicians of our instruments. Now what we have to do is employ our skill to tell the dramatic story of our people and what we’ve been through." The album inspired Roach to broaden his scope as a composer and collaborate with choreographers, filmmakers, and Off-Broadway playwrights on projects such as a stage version of We Insist!.

Audiences, along with critics, found the album to be controversial. This was especially the case in the performances of the work at the Jazz Gallery in New York City. However, according to DownBeat magazine, 2,500 NAACP members were in the audience at a performance at the NAACP national convention, and there was a decision to "support further performances in as many cities as could be fitted into a schedule. There [was] even a proposal calling for air travel in a chartered Freedom Plane".

With the album, Roach was among the first artists to use jazz as a way of addressing racial and political issues during the 1960s. In a retrospective five-star review of the album, Allmusic's Michael G. Nastos called it a crucial work in the civil rights movement of the early 1960s, Roach's discography, and African-American music in general because of the emotional range and resolve of the music and the enduring relevance of its message: "Every modern man, woman, and child could learn exponentially listening to this recording — a hallmark for living life." John Morthland of eMusic gave the album four-and-a-half stars and wrote that, as a "jazz landmark" and enduring civil rights statement, it provided the model for numerous subsequent musical suites and presentations that dealt with the same subject.

In addition to a maximum four-star rating, The Penguin Guide to Jazz Recordings included the album in its suggested “core collection” of essential recordings, and awarded it a “crown” indicating a recording for which the authors felt a particular admiration or affection.

In 2007, We Insist! was reissued by Candid in honor of Roach after his death. John Fordham of The Guardian gave the reissue four stars and called it a "landmark jazz album" that "testifies simultaneously to Roach's remarkable playing, his clout in the jazz world, and his politics.".

The album has also received acclaim outside of jazz criticism, with Pitchfork ranking the album as the 153rd best of the 1960s and singling out the track "All Africa" as a highlight.

Scholar Richard Brent Turner writes in his 2021 book, Soundtrack to a Movement: African American Islam, Jazz, and Black Internationalism (New York University Press) that the album "set the tone for the liberation values that Islam and jazz exemplified in the 1960s and the intersecting political strategies of civil rights and Black Power that influenced the global consciousness of musicians."

== Track listing ==
=== Side one ===
1. "Driva Man" (Roach, Oscar Brown) – 5:17
2. "Freedom Day" (Roach, Brown) – 6:08
3. "Triptych: Prayer/Protest/Peace" (Roach) – 8:09

=== Side two ===
1. "All Africa" (Roach, Brown) – 8:01
2. "Tears for Johannesburg" (Roach) – 9:42

== Personnel ==
- Max Roach – drums
- Abbey Lincoln – vocals
- Booker Little – trumpet on "Driva Man", "Freedom Day", "All Africa", and "Tears for Johannesburg"
- Julian Priester – trombone on "Driva Man", "Freedom Day", and "Tears for Johannesburg"
- Walter Benton – tenor saxophone on "Driva Man", "Freedom Day", and "Tears for Johannesburg"
- Coleman Hawkins – tenor saxophone on "Driva Man"
- James Schenk – bass on "Driva Man", "Freedom Day", and "Tears for Johannesburg"
- Michael Olatunji – congas, vocals on side two
- Raymond Mantilla – percussion on side two
- Tomas du Vall – percussion on side two

== See also ==
- Ten Freedom Summers
