= Fantastic Frank Strozier =

Studio album by Frank Strozier
- Released: 1960
- Recorded: December 9, 1959 (#1–2, 7–10); February 3, 1960 (#3–6, 11)
- Studio: Fine Sound (New York City) (#1–2, 7–10); Bell Sound (New York City) (#3–6, 11)
- Genre: Jazz
- Length: 34:46 original LP; 72:15 CD reissue
- Label: Vee-Jay; VJLP 3005
- Producer: Sid McCoy

Frank Strozier chronology
Fantastic Frank Strozier (1960)	Long Night (1961)

Fantastic Frank Strozier is the debut album by American saxophonist Frank Strozier, recorded in 1959 and 1960 for Vee-Jay Records. The personnel includes the rhythm section from part of Miles Davis's Kind of Blue, recorded earlier in 1959.

== Reception ==
Scott Yanow of AllMusic describes the music of Fantastic Frank Strozier as "advanced hard bop" that "is both enjoyable and (due to Little's presence) somewhat historic"; (trumpeter Booker Little died in 1961 after a short but brilliant career, making this album one of Little's few recordings). Critics Richard Cook and Brian Morton of The Penguin Guide to Jazz gave the album a favorable review, noting that "we have long held this record in high esteem and it never fails to deliver."

Professional ratings
Review scores
Source	Rating
AllMusic	4.5/5 stars
Penguin Guide to Jazz	3/4 stars

== Track listing ==
All compositions by Frank Strozier except as indicated

1. "W. K. Blues" (Wynton Kelly) – 4:07
2. "A Starling's Theme" – 5:27
3. "I Don't Know" – 8:19
4. "Waltz of the Demons" (Booker Little) – 5:42
5. "Runnin'" – 4:20
6. "Off Shore" (Leo Diamond, Michael Goldsen) – 6:51

Bonus tracks on VeeJay 2014 CD reissue:

7. "Lucka Duce" – 9:57
8. "Run" – 3:39
9. "Tibbit" – 9:51
10. "Just in Time" (Jule Styne, Betty Comden, Adolph Green) – 7:30
11. "Off Shore" (Alternate Take 3) (Leo Diamond, Michael Goldsen) – 6:32

Bonus tracks on Koch Jazz 2000 CD reissue:

7. "Lucka Duce" – 9:57
8. "Tibbit" – 9:51
9. "Just in Time" (Jule Styne, Betty Comden, Adolph Green) – 7:30
10. "Waltz of the Demons" (Alternate Take) (Booker Little) – 6:30
11. "Off Shore" (Alternate Take 3) (Leo Diamond, Michael Goldsen) – 6:32

== Personnel ==
- Frank Strozier – alto sax
- Booker Little – trumpet
- Wynton Kelly – piano
- Paul Chambers – bass
- Jimmy Cobb – drums
