= March of the Siamese Children =

Studio album by Frank Strozier Quartet
- Released: July 1962
- Recorded: March 28, 1962; Plaza Sound Studios, New York City
- Genre: Jazz
- Length: 39:41
- Label: Jazzland; JLP 70
- Producer: Orrin Keepnews

Frank Strozier Quartet chronology
Long Night (1961)	March of the Siamese Children (1962)	Remember Me (1977)

Professional ratings
Review scores
Source	Rating
AllMusic	3/5 stars
Down Beat	3/5 stars

March of the Siamese Children is an album by jazz musician Frank Strozier, recorded in 1962 for Jazzland.

== Track listing ==
1. "March of the Siamese Children" (Rodgers, Hammerstein II) – 5:10
2. "Extension 27" (Strozier) – 4:57
3. "Something I Dreamed Last Night" (Fain, Magidson, Yellen) – 5:21
4. "Don't Follow the Crowd" (Bill Lee) – 4:58
5. "Our Waltz" (David Rose) – 5:33
6. "Will I Forget?" (Strozier) – 5:32
7. "Lap" (Lee) – 3:35
8. "Hey, Lee!" (Mabern) – 4:35

== Personnel ==
- Frank Strozier – alto sax, flute (1, 6)
- Harold Mabern – piano
- Bill Lee – bass
- Al Dreares – drums
