= A Few Miles from Memphis =

Studio album by Harold Mabern
- Released: 1968
- Recorded: March 11, 1968
- Studio: Van Gelder Studio, Englewood Cliffs, New Jersey
- Genre: Jazz
- Length: 40:56
- Label: Prestige; PR 7568
- Producer: Cal Lampley

Harold Mabern chronology
A Few Miles from Memphis (1968)	Rakin' and Scrapin' (1968)

A Few Miles from Memphis is the first album with pianist Harold Mabern as leader. It was recorded in 1968 and released on the Prestige label in the same year.

== Reception ==
Professional ratings
Review scores
Source	Rating
Allmusic	3/5 stars
The Penguin Guide to Jazz Recordings	3/4 stars

In his review for Allmusic, Ronnie D. Lankford Jr. calls the album "a bluesy, rhythm-filled set".

== Track listing ==
All compositions by Harold Mabern except as noted

1. "A Few Miles From Memphis" - 5:30
2. "Walkin' Back" - 5:52
3. "A Treat For Bea" - 6:08
4. "Syden Blue" - 4:00
5. "There's a Kind of Hush" (Geoff Stephens, Les Reed) - 5:35
6. "B & B" - 7:27
7. "To Wane" - 6:24

== Personnel ==
- Harold Mabern - piano
- George Coleman, Buddy Terry - tenor saxophone
- Bill Lee - bass
- Walter Perkins - drums
