= It's Time (Max Roach album) =

Studio album by Max Roach
- Released: 1962
- Recorded: February 15, 26–27, 1962
- Studio: Fine Recording Ballroom Studio A New York City
- Genre: Jazz
- Length: 43:51
- Label: Impulse! A-16
- Producer: Bob Thiele

Max Roach chronology
Percussion Bitter Sweet (1961)	It's Time (1962)	Money Jungle (1963)

Professional ratings
Review scores
Source	Rating
AllMusic	4/5 stars
Down Beat	4/5 stars
The Rolling Stone Jazz Record Guide	4/5 stars
The Penguin Guide to Jazz Recordings	4/4 stars
Tom Hull	B+

It's Time is a 1962 album by jazz drummer Max Roach, released on Impulse! Records which also features trumpeter Richard Williams, tenor saxophonist Clifford Jordan, trombonist Julian Priester, pianist Mal Waldron, bassist Art Davis, and a vocal choir conducted by Coleridge-Taylor Perkinson. Singer Abbey Lincoln appears on "Lonesome Lover".

== Track listing ==
All composed by Max Roach

1. "It's Time" – 6:44
2. "Another Valley" – 8:46
3. "Sunday Afternoon" – 6:16
4. "Living Room" – 7:31
5. "The Profit" – 7:32
6. "Lonesome Lover" – 7:02

Recorded on February 15 (tracks 1, 4), February 26 (tracks 2, 5), February 27 (tracks 3, 6), 1962.

== Personnel ==
- Max Roach – drums
- Richard Williams – trumpet
- Julian Priester – trombone
- Clifford Jordan – tenor saxophone
- Mal Waldron – piano
- Art Davis – bass
- Coleridge-Taylor Perkinson – conductor
- Abbey Lincoln – vocals (#6)
