= Percussion Bitter Sweet =

Studio album by Max Roach
- Released: Late 1961
- Recorded: August 1, 3, 8–9, 1961; Van Gelder Studio; Englewood Cliffs, NJ
- Genre: Jazz
- Length: 40:50
- Label: Impulse! A-8
- Producer: Max Roach

Max Roach chronology
We Insist! (1961)	Percussion Bitter Sweet (1961)	It's Time (1962)

Professional ratings
Review scores
Source	Rating
Down Beat	2.5/5 stars
AllMusic	5/5 stars
Tom Hull	B+

Percussion Bitter Sweet is an album by jazz drummer Max Roach recorded in 1961, released on Impulse! Records. It was trumpeter Booker Little's penultimate recording before he died from uremia in early October 1961.

== Track listing ==
All compositions by Max Roach, except where noted

1. "Garvey's Ghost" - 7:53
2. "Mama" - 4:50
3. "Tender Warriors" - 6:52
4. "Praise for a Martyr" - 7:09
5. "Mendacity" (Chips Bayen, Max Roach) - 8:54
6. "Man From South Africa" - 5:12

Tracks 1 and 5 recorded on August 1, 1961; #2 and 3 on August 3; #4 on August 8 and #6 on August 9, 1961.

== Personnel ==
- Booker Little - trumpet
- Julian Priester - trombone
- Eric Dolphy - alto saxophone, flute, bass clarinet
- Clifford Jordan - tenor saxophone
- Mal Waldron - piano
- Art Davis - double bass
- Max Roach - drums, percussion
- Carlos "Patato" Valdés - congas (1, 3, 6)
- Eugenio "Totico" Arango (credited as Carlos Eugenio) - cowbell (1, 3, 6)
- Abbey Lincoln - vocal (1, 5)

== Production ==
- Margo Guryan - liner notes
