= Max Roach + 4 on the Chicago Scene =

Studio album by Max Roach
- Released: 1958
- Recorded: June 3, 1958; Universal Recorders, Chicago
- Genre: Jazz
- Length: 31:21
- Labels: EmArcy; MG 36132

Max Roach chronology
MAX (1958)	Max Roach + 4 on the Chicago Scene (1958)	Max Roach + 4 at Newport (1958)

Max Roach + 4 on the Chicago Scene is an album by the American jazz drummer Max Roach featuring tracks recorded in Chicago in 1958 and released on the EmArcy label in mono; alternate versions of four tracks were released in Japan on a 1984 stereo reissue.

== Reception ==
Professional ratings
Review scores
Source	Rating
Allmusic	4/5 stars
The Rolling Stone Jazz Record Guide	3/5 stars
The Penguin Guide to Jazz Recordings	3/4 stars

Allmusic awarded the album 4 stars. In his review, Scott Yanow wrote, "This album might be brief (only around 31 minutes) but it has plenty of fine playing."

== Track listing ==
1. "Shirley" (George Coleman) - 6:42
2. "My Old Flame" (Sam Coslow, Arthur Johnston) - 3:41
3. "Sporty" (Bill Lee) - 5:53
4. "Stella by Starlight" (Ned Washington, Victor Young) - 4:23
5. "Stompin' at the Savoy" (Benny Goodman, Andy Razaf, Edgar Sampson, Chick Webb) - 2:55
6. "Memo: To Maurice" (Eddie Baker) - 7:47

== Personnel ==
- Max Roach - drums
- Booker Little - trumpet
- George Coleman - tenor saxophone
- Eddie Baker - piano
- Bob Cranshaw - upright bass
