= Remember Me (Frank Strozier album) =

Studio album by Frank Strozier Sextet
- Released: Early 1977
- Recorded: November 10, 1976; New York City
- Genre: Jazz
- Length: 42:53
- Label: SteepleChase; SCS 1066
- Producer: Nils Winther

Frank Strozier Sextet chronology
March of the Siamese Children (1962)	Remember Me (1977)	What's Goin' On (1978)

Professional ratings
Review scores
Source	Rating
AllMusic	4/5 stars
The Penguin Guide to Jazz Recordings	3/4 stars

Remember Me is an album by jazz musician Frank Strozier, recorded in 1976 for SteepleChase Records.

== Track listing ==
All tracks by Strozier, except where noted.

1. "Remember Me" – 6:32
2. "Kram Samba" – 4:54
3. "Neicy" – 6:41
4. "Sidestreet" – 4:22
5. "For Our Elders" – 8:50
6. "Get Out of Town" (Cole Porter) – 6:32
7. "Hit It" (Atkinson) – 5:02

== Personnel ==
- Frank Strozier – alto sax, flute (3)
- Danny Moore – flugelhorn (all except 5)
- Howard Johnson – tuba (all except 5)
- Harold Mabern – piano
- Lisle Atkinson – bass
- Michael Carvin – drums
