= What's Goin' On (Frank Strozier album) =

Studio album by Frank Strozier Quintet
- Released: 1978
- Recorded: November 5, 1977
- Studio: Mediasound (New York City)
- Genre: Jazz
- Length: 34:18
- Label: SteepleChase; SCD 17001
- Producer: Nils Winther

Frank Strozier Quintet chronology
Remember Me (1977)	What's Goin' On (1978)

Professional ratings
Review scores
Source	Rating
AllMusic	3/5 stars
The Penguin Guide to Jazz Recordings	3/4 stars

What's Goin' On is an album by jazz musician Frank Strozier, recorded in 1977 for SteepleChase Records. It would be his last effort as a leader.

== Track listing ==
All tracks by Strozier, except where noted.

1. "What's Going On" – 13:41 (Gaye, Benson, Cleveland)
2. "The Chief" – 4:14 (Mabern)
3. "Chelsea Drugs" – 5:19
4. "Ollie" – 4:28
5. "Psalm for John Coltrane" – 6:36

== Personnel ==
- Frank Strozier – alto sax, flute (3)
- Danny Moore – trumpet (2–3)
- Harold Mabern – piano
- Stafford James – bass
- Louis Hayes – drums
