= Exultation! =

Studio album by Booker Ervin
- Released: October 1963
- Recorded: June 19, 1963
- Studio: Van Gelder Studio, Englewood Cliffs, NJ
- Genre: Jazz
- Length: 36:51 1963 LP; 41:58 1970 LP/CD reissue
- Label: Prestige; PRLP 7293 (1963); PRLP 7844 (1970)
- Producer: Don Schlitten

Booker Ervin chronology
That's It! (1961)	Exultation! (1963)	Gumbo! (1963)

Alternative cover
- 1970 LP reissue (PRLP 7844)

Exultation! is an album by American jazz saxophonist Booker Ervin featuring performances recorded in 1963 for the Prestige label. It was first released in 1963, then reissued in 1971 with two alternate takes labeled "short version" (the a- and b-sides of a 1963 single, "No Land's Man" backed with "Just in Time").

== Reception ==
The AllMusic review by Scott Yanow awarded the album 4 stars and stated "Ervin and Strozier made a mutually inspiring team; pity that this was their only recording together".

Professional ratings
Review scores
Source	Rating
AllMusic	4/5 stars
The Rolling Stone Jazz Record Guide	3/5 stars
The Penguin Guide to Jazz Recordings	3/4 stars

== Track listing ==
All compositions by Booker Ervin except as indicated

1. "Mooche Mooche" – 7:18
2. "Black and Blue" (Harry Brooks, Andy Razaf, Fats Waller) – 6:19
3. "Mour" (Perkins) – 4:08
4. "Just in Time" (Jule Styne, Betty Comden, Adolph Green) – 2:29
5. "Just in Time" [Long Take] (Styne, Comden, Green) – 4:55
6. "No Land's Man" (Booker Ervin, Walter Perkins) – 2:38
7. "No Land's Man" [Long Take] (Booker Ervin, Walter Perkins) – 5:39
8. "Tune In" – 8:32

== Personnel ==
- Booker Ervin – tenor saxophone
- Frank Strozier – alto saxophone
- Horace Parlan – piano
- Butch Warren – bass
- Walter Perkins – drums
