= Frank Strozier =

American jazz saxophonist (born 1937)

- Born: Frank R. Strozier, Jr. June 13, 1937 (age 88); Memphis, Tennessee, U.S.
- Genres: Jazz
- Occupations: Musician, composer
- Instruments: Alto saxophone, flute, piano
- Years active: 1958-1990
- Labels: Vee-Jay; Jazzland; SteepleChase

Frank R. Strozier Jr. (born June 13, 1937) is a jazz alto saxophonist, flutist, pianist and composer.

== Life and career ==
Strozier was born in Memphis, Tennessee, where he learned to play piano. In 1954, after high school, he moved to Chicago, where he studied clarinet at the Chicago Conservatory of Music and performed with Harold Mabern, George Coleman, and Booker Little (like Strozier, they were from Memphis). He recorded with the MJT + 3 from 1959 to 1960, and led sessions for Vee-Jay Records.

After moving to New York, Strozier was briefly with the Miles Davis Quintet in 1963 (between the tenures of Hank Mobley and George Coleman). Along with Coleman and Harold Mabern, he was recommended for Davis' 1963 gig at the Black Hawk by John Coltrane. He also gigged and recorded with Roy Haynes during this time. After moving to Los Angeles, he worked with Chet Baker, Shelly Manne, and the Don Ellis big band. Returning to New York in 1971, he worked with Keno Duke's Jazz Contemporaries, the New York Jazz Repertory Company, Horace Parlan, and Woody Shaw.

Strozier dropped out of the music scene by the mid-1980s. He then became a teacher in the New York public school system. He made a return to music in 1990 in a trio setting as a pianist, but has since been mostly inactive.

== Discography ==
=== As leader ===
- Fantastic Frank Strozier (Vee-Jay, 1960)
- Long Night (Jazzland, 1961)
- March of the Siamese Children (Jazzland, 1962)
- Here's Frank Strozier (Vee-Jay, 1977, recorded 1960)
- Remember Me (SteepleChase, 1977)
- What's Goin' On (SteepleChase, 1978)

=== As sideman ===
With Roy Haynes

- Cymbalism (New Jazz, 1963)
- People (Pacific Jazz, 1964)

With Shelly Manne

- Manne–That's Gershwin! (Capitol, 1965)
- Boss Sounds! (Atlantic, 1966)
- Daktari (Atlantic, 1967)
- Jazz Gunn (Atlantic, 1967)
- Perk Up (Concord Jazz, 1976)

With MJT+3

- Make Everybody Happy (Vee Jay, 1959)
- MJT + 3 (Vee Jay, 1961)

With Oliver Nelson

- Live from Los Angeles (Impulse!, 1967)
- Black, Brown and Beautiful (Flying Dutchman, 1970)

With others

- Booker Little, Booker Little 4 and Max Roach (1958)
- Walter Perkins, Walter Perkins' MJT+3 (Vee Jay, 1959)
- Johnny Griffin, The Big Soul-Band (Riverside, 1960)
- The Young Lions, The Young Lions (Vee Jay, 1960)
- Sam Jones, Down Home (Riverside, 1962)
- Booker Ervin, Exultation! (Prestige, 1963)
- McCoy Tyner, Today and Tomorrow (Impulse!, 1964)
- Chet Baker, Baby Breeze (Limelight, 1965)
- Don Ellis, Autumn (Columbia, 1968)
- The Three Sounds and the Oliver Nelson Orchestra, Coldwater Flat (Blue Note, 1968)
- Steve Allen, Soulful Brass (Flying Dutchman, 1969)
- Sonny Stitt, Dumpy Mama (Flying Dutchman, 1975)
- Horace Parlan, Frank-ly Speaking (SteepleChase, 1977)
- Woody Shaw, Little Red's Fantasy (Muse, 1978)
- Louis Hayes, Variety Is the Spice (Gryphon, 1979)
- Stafford James, Stafford James Ensemble (Red, 1979)
