= Max Roach with the Boston Percussion Ensemble =

Live album by Max Roach
- Released: 1958
- Recorded: August 17, 1958
- Venue: The Music Inn, Lenox, Massachusetts
- Genre: Jazz
- Label: EmArcy; MG 36144
- Producer: Jack Tracy

Max Roach chronology
Max Roach + 4 at Newport (1958)	Max Roach with the Boston Percussion Ensemble (1958)	Deeds, Not Words (1958)

Professional ratings
Review scores
Source	Rating
Allmusic	3/5 stars

Max Roach and the Boston Percussion Ensemble is a live album by American jazz drummer Max Roach featuring tracks recorded at the Music Inn in Lenox, Massachusetts in 1958 and released on the EmArcy label.

== Track listing ==
All compositions by Harold Faberman.

1. "Variations on a Familiar Theme"- 6:42
2. "Evolution" - 18:05
3. "The Music Inn Suite: The Music Inn #1" - 0:45
4. "The Music Inn Suite: The Poodle Tower" - 2:51
5. "The Music Inn Suite: Soliloquy #1" - 0:34
6. "The Music Inn Suite: Potting Shed Passacaglia" - 3:28
7. "The Music Inn Suite: Soliloquy #2" - 1:10
8. "The Music Inn Suite: Stephanie B." - 2:16
9. "The Music Inn Suite: Duo Concertante" - 2:16
10. "The Music Inn Suite: The Music Inn #2" - 1:10

== Personnel ==
- Max Roach - drums
- Al Portch - French horn
- Irving Farberman, Everette Firth, Lloyd McCausland, Arthur Press, Charles Smith, Harold Thompson, Walter Tokarczyk - percussion
- Corinne Curry - soprano voice
- Harold Faberman - conductor, musical director
