= Max Roach + 4 at Newport =

Live album by Max Roach
- Released: 1958
- Recorded: July 6, 1958; Newport, Rhode Island
- Venue: Newport Jazz Festival, Newport, Rhode Island
- Genre: Jazz
- Length: 31:21
- Label: EmArcy; MG 36140

Max Roach chronology
Max Roach + 4 on the Chicago Scene (1958)	Max Roach + 4 at Newport (1958)	Max Roach with the Boston Percussion Ensemble (1958)

Max Roach + 4 at Newport is a live album by American jazz drummer Max Roach recorded at the Newport Jazz Festival in 1958 and released on the EmArcy label.

== Track listing ==
1. "La Villa" (Kenny Dorham) - 6:19
2. "A Night in Tunisia" (Dizzy Gillespie, Frank Paparelli) - 8:20
3. "Deeds, Not Words" (Bill Lee) - 4:28
4. "Minor Mode" (Booker Little) - 5:30
5. "Tune-Up" (Miles Davis) - 5:21
6. "Love for Sale" (Cole Porter) - 9:57

== Personnel ==
- Max Roach - drums
- Booker Little - trumpet
- George Coleman - tenor saxophone
- Ray Draper - tuba
- Art Davis - bass

== Reception ==
In his review for AllMusic, Scott Yanow rated the album 4 of 5 stars, stating, "The main reason to search for this out-of-print LP is for the playing of the great, if short-lived, trumpeter Booker Little who was the first on his instrument to emerge from the shadow of Clifford Brown and start to develop his own voice... The quintet performs six consistently enjoyable and hard-swinging numbers."
