= Walter Perkins (musician) =

American jazz musician (1932–2004)

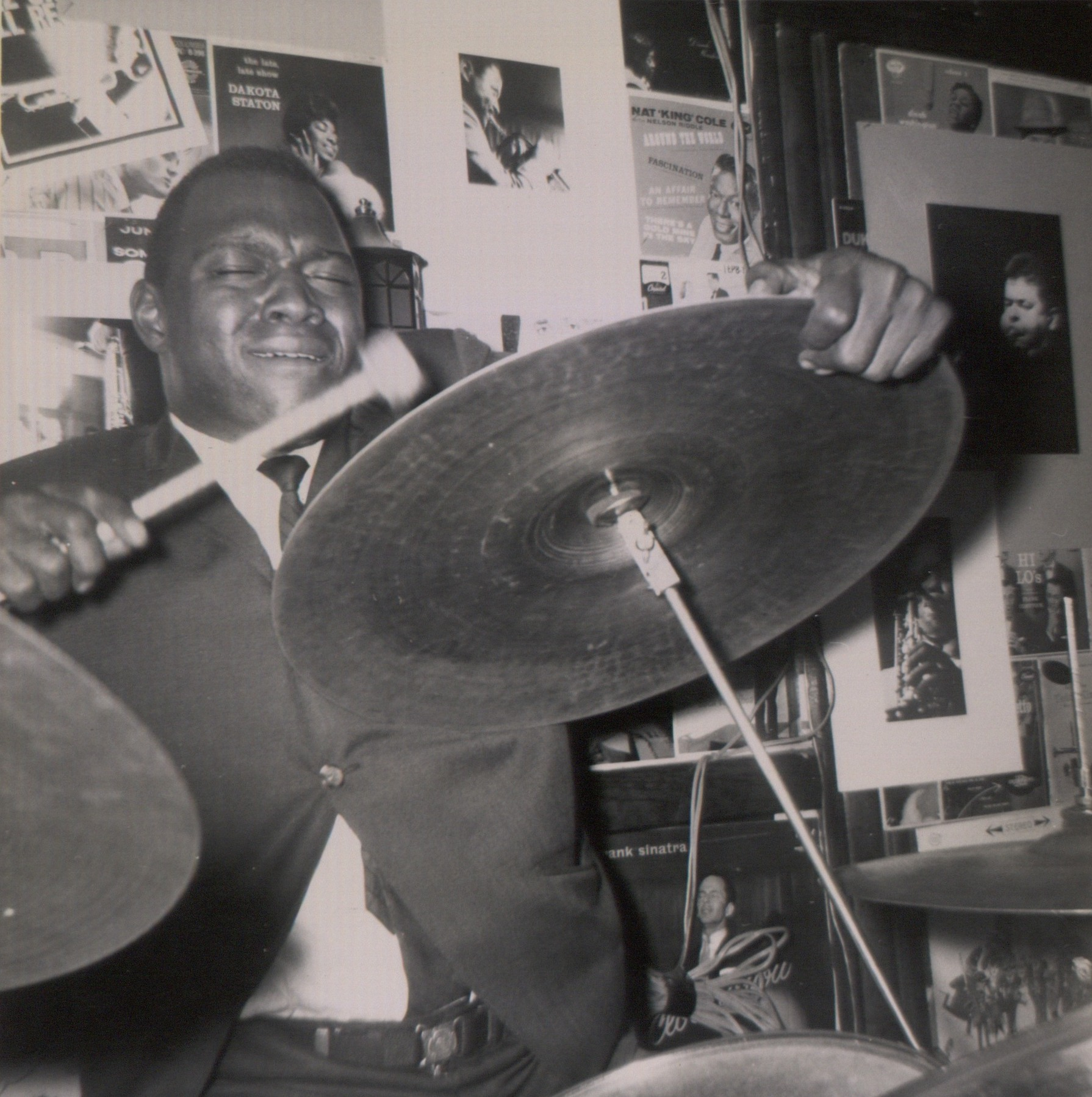
- Perkins in 1963

Background information
- Born: October 2, 1932; Chicago, Illinois, U.S.
- Died: February 14, 2004 (aged 71) Queens, New York City, U.S.
- Instrument: Drums

Walter "Baby Sweets" Perkins (February 10, 1932 – February 14, 2004) was an American jazz drummer.

Starting out in Chicago, Perkins began his professional career with Ahmad Jamal in 1956–57. He recorded for Argo Records in 1957 as a leader under the name MJT+3 with Paul Serrano on trumpet, Nicky Hill on tenor sax, Muhal Richard Abrams on piano, and Bob Cranshaw on bass. In 1959, he regrouped under the same name with Willie Thomas on trumpet, Frank Strozier on alto sax, Harold Mabern on piano, and Cranshaw on bass; they recorded for Vee-Jay in 1959 and 1960 and played in Chicago until 1962, when he moved to New York City.

Perkins played with Sonny Rollins in 1962 and accompanied Carmen McRae in 1962–63. In 1964 he played with Art Farmer and Teddy Wilson. Following this he recorded with many musicians, including Rahsaan Roland Kirk, George Shearing, Gene Ammons, Charles Mingus, Billy Taylor, Booker Ervin, Jaki Byard, Lucky Thompson, Pat Martino, Sonny Stitt, Sonny Criss, and Charles Earland.

He died in Queens of lung cancer at the age of 72.

== Discography ==
With MJT+3

- Daddy-O Presents MJT + 3 (Argo, 1957)
- Walter Perkins' MJT + 3 (Vee-Jay, 1959)
- Make Everybody Happy (Vee-Jay, 1960)
- MJT + 3 (Vee-Jay, 1960)
- Message from Walton Street (Vee-Jay, 1960)

With Ahmed Abdul-Malik

- Spellbound (Status, 1964)

With Gene Ammons

- Twisting the Jug (Prestige, 1961) with Joe Newman and Jack McDuff
- Soul Summit Vol. 2 (Prestige, 1962)
- Late Hour Special (Prestige, 1962, [1964])
- Sock! (Prestige, 1962 [1965])

With Chris Anderson

- Inverted Image (Jazzland, 1961)

With Peter Brötzmann

- The Ink Is Gone (2002)

With Ray Bryant

- Soul (Sue, 1965)

With Jaki Byard

- Out Front! (Prestige, 1964)

With Johnny Coles

- Little Johnny C (Blue Note, 1963)

With Sonny Criss

- Sonny Criss at the Crossroads (Peacock, 1959)

With Charles Earland

- Soul Crib (Choice, 1969)
- Smokin' (Muse, 1969/77 [1977])
- Mama Roots (Muse, 1969/77 [1977])

With Booker Ervin

- Exultation! (Prestige, 1964)

With Art Farmer

- Interaction (Atlantic, 1963) with Jim Hall
- Live at the Half-Note (Atlantic, 1963) with Jim Hall

With Gigi Gryce

- Reminiscin' (Mercury, 1960)

With Ahmad Jamal

- Count 'Em 88 (Argo, 1956)

With J. J. Johnson

- J.J.'s Broadway (Verve, 1963)

With Etta Jones

- Lonely and Blue (Prestige, 1962)

With Roland Kirk

- Reeds & Deeds (1963)
- I Talk with the Spirits (1964)

With Harold Mabern

- A Few Miles from Memphis (Prestige, 1968)

With Pat Martino

- Strings! (Prestige, 1967)

With Charles Mingus

- Mingus Mingus Mingus Mingus Mingus (Impulse!, 1963)

With Sal Nistico

- Heavyweights (Jazzland, 1961)

With William Parker

- Bob's Pink Cadillac (Eremite, 2000)

With Duke Pearson

- Hush! (Jazzline, 1962)

With Dave Pike

- Pike's Peak (Epic, 1962)
- Dave Pike Plays the Jazz Version of Oliver! (Moodsville, 1963)

With Sonny Stitt

- The Matadors Meet the Bull (Roulette, 1965)
- What's New!!! (Roulette, 1966)
- I Keep Comin' Back! (Roulette, 1966)

With Frank Strozier

- Long Night (Jazzland, 1961)

With Billy Taylor

- Impromptu (Mercury, 1962)

With Clark Terry

- The Happy Horns of Clark Terry (Impulse!, 1964)

With Lucky Thompson

- Lucky Thompson Plays Happy Days Are Here Again (Prestige, 1965)

With Bobby Timmons

- Holiday Soul (1964)

With John Wright

- Mr. Soul (Prestige, 1962)
