= The Many Sides of Max =

Studio album by Max Roach Quintet
- Released: 1964
- Recorded: January 22, 1959; Fine Recording, New York City
- Genre: Jazz
- Length: 31:40
- Label: Mercury; MG 20911

Max Roach chronology
Award-Winning Drummer (1958)	The Many Sides of Max (1964)	Rich Versus Roach (1959)

The Many Sides of Max is an album by American jazz drummer Max Roach featuring tracks recorded in 1959 but not released on the Mercury label until 1964.

== Reception ==
Professional ratings
Review scores
Source	Rating
Allmusic	3/5 stars
The Rolling Stone Jazz Record Guide	4/5 stars

Allmusic awarded the album 3 stars with its review by Scott Yanow stating "all seven selections on the admittedly brief album (around 31 minutes) are worth hearing".

== Track listing ==
All compositions by Max Roach except as indicated

1. "Prelude" (Consuela Lee) — 5:06
2. "Lepa" (Muhal Richard Abrams) — 2:08
3. "Connie's Bounce" (Lee) — 5:19
4. "A Little Sweet" — 3:05
5. "Tympanalli" — 4:52
6. "Bemsha Swing" (Denzil Best, Thelonious Monk) — 5:26
7. "There's No You" (Tom Adair, George Durgom, Hal Hopper) — 5:41

== Personnel ==
- Max Roach — drums
- Booker Little — trumpet
- Julian Priester — trombone
- George Coleman — tenor saxophone
- Art Davis — bass
