= Freedom Suite (Sonny Rollins album) =

1958 studio album by Sonny Rollins

Studio album by Sonny Rollins
- Released: June 1958
- Recorded: February 11 & March 7, 1958
- Studio: WOR Recording Studio
- Genre: Jazz
- Length: 40:43
- Label: Riverside; Jazzland (reissue)
- Producer: Orrin Keepnews, Bill Grauer

Sonny Rollins chronology
| Sonny Rollins Plays (1958) | Freedom Suite (1958) | Sonny Side Up (1959) |

Freedom Suite is a 1958 studio album by jazz saxophonist Sonny Rollins, his last recorded for the Riverside label, featuring performances by Rollins with Oscar Pettiford and Max Roach.

== Reception ==
Professional ratings
Review scores
| Source | Rating |
|---|---|
| AllMusic | 4.5/5 stars |
| The Rolling Stone Jazz Record Guide | 5/5 stars |
| The Penguin Guide to Jazz Recordings | 3.5/4 stars |

The AllMusic review by Scott Yanow states: "Rollins is very creative, stretching out on his lengthy 'Freedom Suite,' clearly enjoying investigating the obscure Noël Coward melody 'Someday I'll Find You,' turning the show tune 'Till There Was You' into jazz, and finding beauty in 'Shadow Waltz' and 'Will You Still Be Mine?' A near masterpiece."

== Track listing ==
1. "The Freedom Suite" (Sonny Rollins) - 19:17
2. "Someday I'll Find You" (Noël Coward) - 4:35
3. "Will You Still Be Mine?" (Tom Adair, Matt Dennis) - 2:54
4. "Till There Was You" (Meredith Willson) - 4:54
5. "Till There Was You" [alternate take] (Willson) - 4:55 Bonus track on CD rerelease
6. "Shadow Waltz" (Al Dubin, Harry Warren) - 4:08
- Recorded at WOR Recording Studio, NYC, on February 11 (tracks 2–6), and March 7 (track 1), 1958

== Personnel ==
- Sonny Rollins – tenor saxophone
- Oscar Pettiford – bass
- Max Roach – drums
