= Far Cry (album) =

Studio album by Eric Dolphy
- Released: 1962
- Recorded: December 21, 1960
- Studios: Van Gelder Studio, Englewood Cliffs, NJ
- Genres: Jazz, avant-garde jazz
- Length: 41:38
- Labels: New Jazz; NJ 8270
- Producer: Esmond Edwards

Eric Dolphy chronology
| At the Five Spot (1961) | Far Cry (1962) | The Quest (1962) |

Professional ratings
Review scores
| Source | Rating |
|---|---|
| AllMusic | 4.5/5 stars |
| DownBeat (Original Lp release) | 3.5/5 stars |
| The Penguin Guide to Jazz | 4/4 stars |
| The Rolling Stone Jazz Record Guide | 5/5 stars |

Far Cry is the third album by jazz musician Eric Dolphy, released in 1962 on New Jazz (a subsidiary of the Prestige label.) Featuring a quintet co-led with trumpeter Booker Little, it is one of the few recordings of their partnership. Pianist Jaki Byard, bassist Ron Carter and drummer Roy Haynes all return from earlier Dolphy albums. This was a busy time for Dolphy- he took part in Ornette Coleman's Free Jazz session and recorded this album on the same day, and had participated in the Jazz Abstractions ("John Lewis Presents Contemporary Music: Compositions by Gunther Schuller and Jim Hall") project the previous day.

== Content ==
The entire first side presents a suite to Charlie Parker. "Mrs. Parker of K.C. (Bird's Mother)" and "Ode to Charlie Parker," both composed by pianist Jaki Byard, are respectively dedicated to Addie, Charlie Parker's mother, and a tribute to Parker. "Far Cry," composed by Dolphy, is also a tribute to Parker (the melody is identical to "Out There"), while "Miss Ann" is a musical portrait of a girl whom Dolphy knew at the time. Pianist Mal Waldron, who would be in Dolphy's touring band during 1961, composed the tribute to Billie Holiday "Left Alone." The album also includes two standards among the originals, "Tenderly" and "It's Magic." Little only appears on "Miss Ann" during side two, and "Tenderly" is Dolphy unaccompanied on alto saxophone.

The album was reissued on Fantasy Records in 20-bit resolution on August 20, 2002. A bonus track of Eric Dolphy's "Serene," re-recorded at these sessions and previously recorded for his album Out There, was included.

== Reception ==
In a review for AllMusic, Al Campbell wrote: "Charlie Parker's influence permeates this 1960 session. Beyond the obvious acknowledgment on song titles... his restless spirit is utilized as a guiding light for breaking bebop molds... Far Cry finds... Dolphy in a transitional phase, relinquishing Parker's governing universal impact and diving into the next controversial phase...'" Similarly, Stuart Nicholson wrote: "as this album shows, his highly sophisticated style evolved out of bebop and Charlie Parker and was not devised in opposition to it, as many critics at the time thought." He called "Tenderly" "a minor masterpiece, anticipating virtually every technical and structural device on Anthony Braxton’s 'For Alto'." Writing for All About Jazz, C. Michael Bailey called the album "Dolphy's most firmly ground effort in the Be Bop Tradition" and referred to Dolphy as "the grand unifier in jazz", "[d]ecried by neoconservatives as being too free and the jazz freedom fighters as being too traditional."

The authors of The Penguin Jazz Guide noted that Far Cry "marks the first recorded appearance of Dolphy's most celebrated composition, 'Miss Ann', a delightful 14-bar theme that he was to play until the end of his life", and describe Dolphy's performance of "Tenderly" as "an astonishing, unaccompanied alto solo, a piece of work that bridges Coleman Hawkins's pioneering 'Picasso' and Dolphy's own later solo bass clarinet excursions on 'God Bless The Child', except that here the tune is still very much in evidence. Some have suggested that he was influenced by Sonny Rollins's unaccompanied 'Body And Soul', recorded two years earlier."

In his review, David Rickert wrote that on Far Cry, "[e]verything that we've come to love about Dolphy is on display here, from the unorthodox instruments to the stuttering, belligerent solos that seem to go from New York to LA by way of Saturn", and called the album "a bold attempt to challenge the status quo". Martin Williams called Far Cry "evidence of what an ideal companion trumpeter Booker Little was for Dolphy—and what a loss to Dolphy's music Little's death was only ten months later. As Far Cry shows, Little was moving gracefully, and with an easy and unforced trumpet sound, into musical areas in which Dolphy was already feeling comfortable."

== Track listing ==
=== Side one ===
1. "Mrs. Parker of K.C. (Bird's Mother)" (Jaki Byard) – 8:03
2. "Ode to Charlie Parker" (Byard) – 8:42
3. "Far Cry" (Eric Dolphy) – 3:55

=== Side two ===
1. "Miss Ann" (Dolphy) – 4:17
2. "Left Alone" (Billie Holiday, Mal Waldron) – 6:41
3. "Tenderly" (Walter Gross, Jack Lawrence) – 4:20
4. "It's Magic" (Jule Styne, Sammy Cahn) – 5:40

=== CD reissues bonus track ===
8. "Serene" (Dolphy) – 6:37

== Personnel ==
- Eric Dolphy – bass clarinet on "Mrs. Parker of K.C.," "It's Magic," and "Serene"; flute on "Ode to Charlie Parker" and "Left Alone"; alto sax all other tracks
- Booker Little – trumpet on all tracks except "Left Alone", "Tenderly" and "It's Magic"
- Jaki Byard – piano on all tracks except "Tenderly"
- Ron Carter – bass on all tracks except "Tenderly"
- Roy Haynes – drums on all tracks except "Tenderly"
