= At the Five Spot =

Live album by Eric Dolphy
- Released: Volume 1: December 1961; Volume 2: November 1963 Memorial Album: 1965
- Recorded: 16 July 1961
- Venues: Five Spot Café, New York, NY
- Genres: Avant-garde jazz Post-bop
- Label: New Jazz
- Producer: Esmond Edwards

Eric Dolphy chronology
| Where? (1961) | At the Five Spot (1961) | Far Cry (1962) |

Volume Two cover

Professional ratings
Review scores
| Source | Rating |
|---|---|
| AllMusic | 4/5 stars |
| AllMusic | 4/5 stars |
| Down Beat | 3.5/5 stars |
| The Rolling Stone Jazz Record Guide | 5/5 stars |
| The Penguin Guide to Jazz Recordings | 4/4 stars |

Eric Dolphy at the Five Spot is a pair of live albums by the jazz musician and composer Eric Dolphy. They were released in December 1961 (Volume 1) and November 1963 (Volume 2) through Prestige Records. They were recorded on the night of 16 July 1961 at the end of Dolphy's two-week residency, alongside trumpeter Booker Little, at the Five Spot jazz club in New York. It was the only night to be recorded. The engineer was Rudy Van Gelder.

A third volume of recordings from the same evening, given the title Memorial Album, was released in 1965, after the premature deaths of both Little and Dolphy, containing "Number Eight (Potsa Lotsa)" and "Booker's Waltz". These two tracks were later released on the Van Gelder remaster of Volume 2.

cover for Memorial Album

All three volumes were reissued, without alternate takes, as a triple LP under the title The Great Concert of Eric Dolphy. Two other tracks, Mal Waldron's "Status Seeking" and Dolphy's solo rendition of Billie Holiday's "God Bless The Child", were released on the Dolphy compilation Here and There. Dolphy and Little were backed by a rhythm section consisting of pianist Mal Waldron, bassist Richard Davis, and drummer Eddie Blackwell.

Dolphy's composition "The Prophet" is a tribute to the artist Richard "Prophet" Jennings, who had designed the covers of Dolphy's earlier albums, Outward Bound and Out There.

== Reception ==
In an AllMusic review of volume 1, Michael G. Nastos stated that Dolphy's group had "developed into a role model for all progressive jazz combos to come", while "[t]he combined power of Dolphy and Little -- exploring overt but in retrospect not excessive dissonance and atonality -- made them a target for critics but admired among the burgeoning progressive post-bop scene." Nastos continued: "With the always stunning shadings of pianist Mal Waldron, the classical-cum-daring bass playing of Richard Davis, and the colorful drumming of alchemistic Ed Blackwell, there was no stopping this group." He concluded: "Most hail this first volume, and a second companion album from the same sessions, as music that changed the jazz world as much as Ornette Coleman and John Coltrane's innovative excursions of the same era. All forward thinking and challenged listeners need to own these epic club dates."

Scott Yanow, reviewing volume 2, called the album "[a]n excellent set that records what may have been Dolphy's finest group ever, as well as one of that era's best working bands." A review in PDX Jazz called the Five Spot recordings "a tremendous live set" and "a very spirited performance with surprisingly good sound quality given its recording in a mere club back in the early 1960s." Stuart Nicholson, writing for Jazzwise, included the Five Spot tracks in his list of "five essential albums" by Dolphy, and wrote: "Eric Dolphy liked plenty of solo space to express himself, and this live date at New York's Five Spot... gave him precisely that. His fiercely vocalised alto solo on 'Fire Waltz' is the stuff of legend, for many his most memorable, diverging from the linear logic and techniques of variation employed by most post-war jazz musicians."

Dolphy biographers Vladimir Simosko and Barry Tepperman observed that the Five Spot recordings "present the rare opportunity to study a night's work in the club," and stated: "despite any unevenness in strength of solos or tightness of the performances, a very well-balanced and brilliant group is in evidence... the unity and wide dimensions revealed by the preservation of one night's work remain to testify to the quintet's worth and vitality."

== Setlist ==
1. "Status Seeking"
2. "God Bless the Child"
3. "Aggression"
4. "Like Someone in Love"
5. "Fire Waltz"
6. "Bee Vamp" (two takes)
7. "The Prophet"
8. "Number Eight (Potsa Lotsa)"
9. "Booker's Waltz"

== Track listing ==
=== Volume one ===
1. "Fire Waltz" (Waldron) – 13:44
2. "Bee Vamp" (Little) – 12:30
3. "The Prophet" (Dolphy) – 21:22
4. "Bee Vamp" (Alternate Take) – 9:27

(Track 4 not on original LP.)

=== Volume two ===
1. "Aggression" (Little) – 17:21
2. "Like Someone in Love" (Jimmy Van Heusen) – 19:58
3. "Number Eight (Potsa Lotsa)" (Dolphy) – 15:33
4. "Booker's Waltz" (Little) – 14:39

(Tracks 3–4 not on original LP.)

=== Memorial Album ===
1. "Number Eight (Potsa Lotsa)" (Dolphy) – 15:33
2. "Booker's Waltz" (Little) – 14:39

== Personnel ==
- Eric Dolphy — alto saxophone (on "Fire Waltz" and "The Prophet"), bass clarinet (on "Bee Vamp" and "Aggression") and flute (on "Like someone in Love")
- Booker Little — trumpet
- Mal Waldron — piano
- Richard Davis — double bass
- Ed Blackwell — drums

== Sources ==
- Richard Cook & Brian Morton. The Penguin Guide to Jazz on CD 6th edition. ISBN 0-14-051521-6
