= Art Davis (bassist) =

American double bassist

- Born: Arthur David Davis; December 5, 1934; Harrisburg, Pennsylvania, U.S.
- Died: July 29, 2007 (aged 72)
- Genre: Jazz
- Occupation: Musician
- Instrument: Double bass

Arthur David Davis (December 5, 1934 – July 29, 2007) was a double-bassist, known for his work with Thelonious Monk, John Coltrane, Dizzy Gillespie, McCoy Tyner and Max Roach.

== Biography ==
Davis was born in Harrisburg, Pennsylvania, United States, where he began studying the piano at the age of five, switched to tuba, and finally to bass while attending high school. He studied at Juilliard and Manhattan School of Music but graduated from Hunter College.

As a New York session musician, he recorded with many jazz and pop musicians and also in symphony orchestras such as the New York Philharmonic and Los Angeles Philharmonic. He recorded with Dizzy Gillespie, Max Roach, and John Coltrane among other jazz musicians. Art Davis was a professor at Orange Coast College.

Davis is also known for starting a legal case that led to blind auditions for orchestras.

Davis earned a Ph.D. in clinical psychology from New York University in 1982. He moved in 1986 to southern California, where he balanced his teaching and practicing of psychology with jazz performances.

Davis died on July 29, 2007, following a heart attack. He was survived by two sons and a daughter.

== Discography ==
=== As leader ===
- Reemergence (Interplay, 1980) - with Hilton Ruiz, Greg Bandy
- Life (Soul Note, 1985) - with John Hicks, Idris Muhammad, Pharoah Sanders
- A Time Remembered (Jazz Planet, 1995) - with Ravi Coltrane, Herbie Hancock, Marvin Smith

=== As sideman ===
With Gene Ammons

- Up Tight! (Prestige, 1961)
- Boss Soul! (Prestige, 1961)

With John Coltrane

- Africa/Brass (Impulse!, 1961)
- Olé Coltrane (Impulse!, 1961)
- Ascension (Impulse!, 1965)
- The John Coltrane Quartet Plays (Impulse!, 1965)
- Evenings at the Village Gate: John Coltrane with Eric Dolphy (Impulse!, 2023) – rec. 1961

With Dizzy Gillespie

- Gillespiana (Verve, 1960)
- Carnegie Hall Concert (Verve, 1961)

With Freddie Hubbard

- The Artistry of Freddie Hubbard (Impulse!, 1960)
- Ready for Freddie (Blue Note, 1961)

With Elvin Jones

- Elvin! (Riverside, 1962) – rec. 1961–1962
- And Then Again (Atlantic, 1965)

With Tisziji Munoz

- Visiting This Planet (Anami Music, 1980's)
- Hearing Voices (Anami Music, 1980's)

With Max Roach

- Max Roach + 4 at Newport (EmArcy, 1958)
- Deeds, Not Words (Riverside, 1958)
- Award-Winning Drummer (Time, 1958)
- The Many Sides of Max (Mercury, 1959)
- Percussion Bitter Sweet (Impulse!, 1961)
- It's Time (Impulse!, 1962)
- The Max Roach Trio featuring the Legendary Hasaan (Atlantic, 1964)

With Hilton Ruiz

- The People's Music – Live at Jazz Unité, vol 1 (1981)
- Green Street – Live at Jazz Unité, vol 2 (1981)

With others

- Joe Albany, Bird Lives! (Interplay, 1979)
- Count Basie, Back with Basie (Roulette, 1962)
- Art Blakey, A Jazz Message (Impulse!, 1963)
- Buddy Emmons, Steel Guitar Jazz (Mercury, 1964)
- Curtis Fuller, Cabin in the Sky (Impulse!, 1962)
- Bunky Green, Healing the Pain (Delos, 1990)
- Al Grey and Billy Mitchell, The Al Grey - Billy Mitchell Sextet (Argo, 1961)
- Eddie Harris, Bossa Nova (Vee-Jay, 1962)
- Hasaan Ibn Ali, Metaphysics: The Lost Atlantic Album (Omnivore, 2021) – rec. 1965
- Etta Jones, Lonely and Blue (Prestige, 1962)
- Quincy Jones, Golden Boy (Mercury, 1964)
- Clifford Jordan and Sonny Red, A Story Tale (Jazzland, 1961)
- Roland Kirk, We Free Kings (1961)
- Abbey Lincoln, Straight Ahead (Candid, 1961)
- Booker Little, Out Front (Candid, 1961)
- Roberto Magris, Kansas City Outbound (JMood Records, 2008)
- Lee Morgan, Expoobident (1960)
- Joe Newman, Joe Newman Quintet at Count Basie's (Mercury, 1961)
- Dizzy Reece, Manhattan Project (1978)
- Sal Salvador, Juicy Lucy (Bee Hive, 1978)
- Pharoah Sanders, Rejoice (Theresa, 1981)
- Lalo Schifrin, Lalo = Brilliance (Roulette, 1962)
- Shirley Scott, For Members Only (Impulse!, 1963)
- Jack Teagarden, Think Well of Me (Verve, 1962)
- Clark Terry, Clark Terry Plays the Jazz Version of All American (Moodsville, 1962)
- McCoy Tyner, Inception (1962)
- Leo Wright, Blues Shout (Atlantic, 1960)
