= George Coleman =

American jazz saxophonist (born 1935)

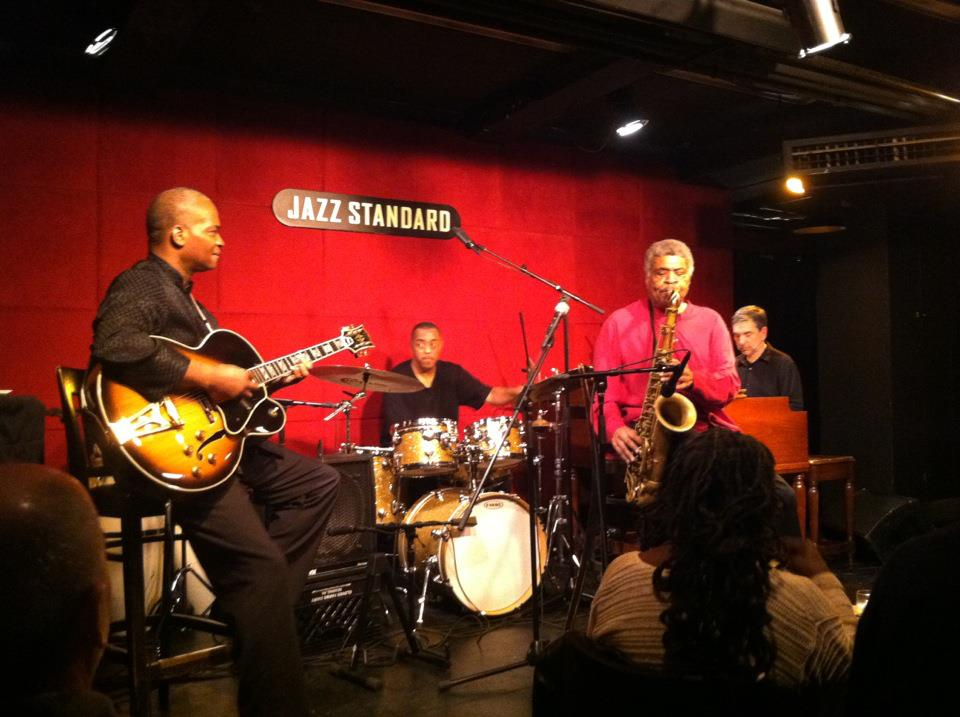
- The George Coleman Quintet, 2012

Background information
- Born: George Edward Coleman; March 8, 1935 (age 91); Memphis, Tennessee, U.S.
- Genres: Jazz, hard bop, post-bop
- Occupation: Musician
- Instrument: Saxophone
- Years active: 1950s–present
- Labels: Evidence, Telarc, Theresa, Smoke Sessions
- Website: georgecoleman.com

George Edward Coleman (born March 8, 1935) is an American jazz saxophonist known for his work with Miles Davis and Herbie Hancock in the 1960s. In 2015, he was named an NEA Jazz Master.

== Early life ==
Coleman was born in Memphis, Tennessee. Inspired by Charlie Parker, Coleman taught himself to play the alto saxophone as a teenager. Among his schoolmates were Harold Mabern, Booker Little, Frank Strozier, Hank Crawford, and Charles Lloyd.

== Later life and career ==
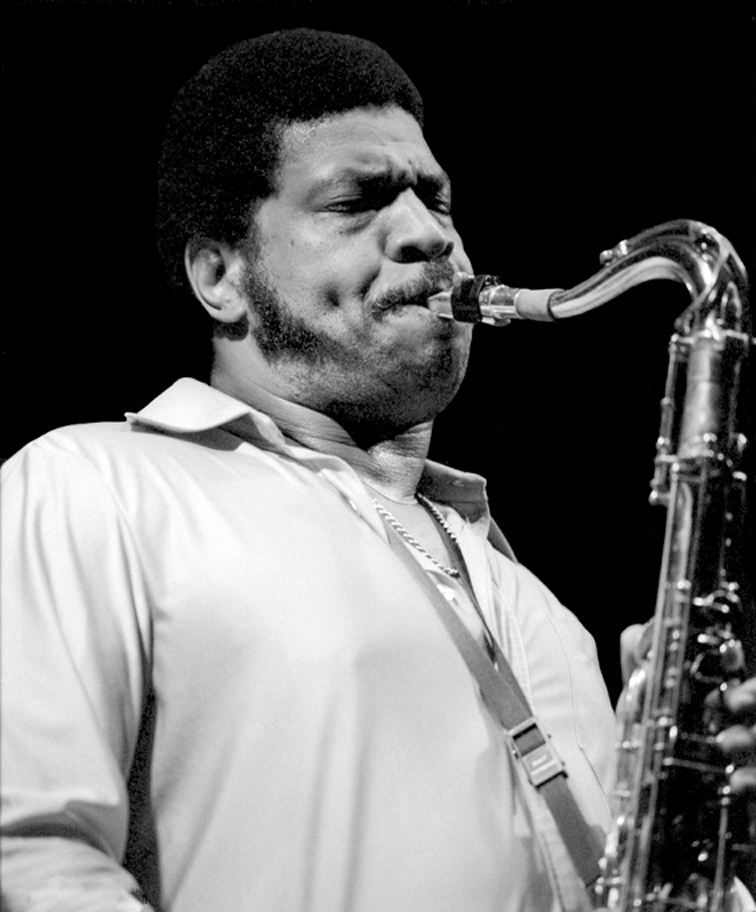
George Coleman at Keystone Korner, San Francisco CA 8/29/79

After working with Ray Charles, Coleman started working with B.B. King in 1953, at which point he switched to tenor saxophone when King needed a tenor player in his band, even buying a tenor saxophone for Coleman. In 1956 Coleman moved to Chicago, along with Booker Little, where he worked with Gene Ammons and Johnny Griffin before joining Max Roach's quintet (1958–1959). Coleman recorded with organist Jimmy Smith on his album House Party (1957), along with Lee Morgan, Curtis Fuller, Kenny Burrell, and Donald Bailey. Moving to New York City with Max Roach in that year, he went on to play with Slide Hampton (1959–1962), Ron Carter, Jimmy Cobb, and Wild Bill Davis (1962), before joining Miles Davis' quintet in 1963–1964.

His albums with Davis (and the rhythm section of Herbie Hancock (piano), Ron Carter (bass), and Tony Williams (drums)) are Seven Steps to Heaven (1963), A Rare Home Town Appearance (1963), Côte Blues (1963), In Europe (1963), My Funny Valentine, and Four & More, both live recordings of a concert in Lincoln Center for the Performing Arts in New York City in February 1964. Shortly after this concert, Coleman left the band and was replaced, briefly, by Sam Rivers before Wayne Shorter joined Davis in September. Nevertheless, Davis retained a high opinion of Coleman's playing, stating that "George played everything almost perfectly...He was a hell of a musician." Coleman played with Lionel Hampton (1965–1966), also in 1965 on Chet Baker's The Prestige Sessions, with Kirk Lightsey, Herman Wright, and Roy Brooks. Clark Terry, Horace Silver, Elvin Jones (1968), Shirley Scott (1972), Cedar Walton (1975), Charles Mingus (1977–1978), Ahmad Jamal (1994, 2000), and many others.

Coleman also appeared in the science-fiction film Freejack (1992), starring Emilio Estevez, Mick Jagger, and Anthony Hopkins; and 1996's The Preacher's Wife, with Denzel Washington and Whitney Houston.

Coleman recorded into the 2020s. His CD as co-leader, Four Generations of Miles: A Live Tribute To Miles, with bassist Ron Carter, drummer Jimmy Cobb and guitarist Mike Stern was released on Chesky Records in October 2002, and it concentrates on the 1960s working repertoire of Miles Davis. Tracks include: "There Is No Greater Love", "All Blues", "On Green Dolphin Street", "Blue in Green", "81", "Freddie Freeloader", "My Funny Valentine", "If I Were a Bell", and "Oleo". He was featured on Organic Vibes (2006) by Joey DeFrancesco, alongside vibraphonist Bobby Hutcherson. The album peaked at No. 17 on Billboard’s Top Jazz Albums chart.

Coleman was married to jazz organist Gloria Coleman. They had two children, including jazz drummer George Coleman Jr. They are divorced.

He was named an NEA Jazz Master and to the Memphis Music Hall of Fame in 2015, and received a brass note on the Beale Street Brass Notes Walk of Fame.

Coleman continues actively performing and recording as of October 2024.

== Discography ==
=== As leader/co-leader ===
Year recorded	Title	Label	Notes
1977	Meditation	Timeless	Duo, with Tete Montoliu (piano)
1977	Revival	Catalyst; Affinity	Octet; released in Europe as Big George
1978	Amsterdam After Dark	Timeless	Quartet, with Hilton Ruiz (piano), Sam Jones (bass), Billy Higgins (drums)
1979	Playing Changes	Jazz House	Quartet, with Hilton Ruiz (piano), Ray Drummond (bass), Billy Higgins (drums); in concert at Ronnie Scott's
1985	Manhattan Panorama	Theresa; Evidence	Quartet, with Harold Mabern (piano), Jamil Nasser (bass), Idris Muhammad (drums); in concert at the Village Vanguard
1989	At Yoshi's	Theresa; Evidence	Quartet, with Harold Mabern (piano), Ray Drummond (bass), Alvin Queen (drums); in concert
1990	Convergence	Triloka	Duo, with Richie Beirach (piano)
1991	My Horns of Plenty	Birdology/Verve; Birdology/Dreyfus	Quartet, with Harold Mabern (piano), Ray Drummond (bass), Billy Higgins (drums)
1995	Blues Inside Out	Jazz House	Quintet, with Peter King (alto sax), Julian Joseph (piano), Dave Green (bass), Mark Taylor (drums); in concert at Ronnie Scott's
1996	Danger High Voltage	Two & Four	Octet, Harold Mabern (piano), Ray Drummond (bass), George Coleman Jr. (drums), Jim Rotondi (trumpet), Adam Brenner (alto sax), Ned Otter (tenor sax), Gary Smulyan (baritone sax), with Daniel Sadownick (percussion) added on several tracks
1998	I Could Write a Book: The Music of Richard Rodgers	Telarc	Quartet, with Harold Mabern (piano), Jamil Nasser (bass), Billy Higgins (drums)
2002	Four Generations of Miles: A Live Tribute To Miles	Chesky	Quartet, with Mike Stern (guitar), Ron Carter (bass), Jimmy Cobb (drums); in concert
2016	A Master Speaks	Smoke Sessions	Quartet, with Mike LeDonne (piano), Bob Cranshaw (bass), George Coleman Jr. (drums); one track quintet, with Peter Bernstein (guitar) added
2018	Groovin' With Big G	SteepleChase	Quartet, Brian Charette (Hammond B3 organ), Vic Juris (guitar), George Coleman Jr. (drums)
2019	The Quartet	Smoke Sessions	Quartet, Harold Mabern (piano), John Webber (bass), Joe Farnsworth (drums)
2020	The George Coleman Quintet in Baltimore	Reel To Real	Quintet, Danny Moore (trumpet), Albert Dailey (piano), Larry Ridley (bass), Harold White (drums); in concert May 23, 1971
2020	On Green Dolphin Street	Blue Jack; Solid	Quartet, with Rob Agerbeek (piano), Rob Langereis (bass), Eric Ineke (drums); in concert April 9, 1974
2023	George Coleman Live at Smalls Jazz Club	Cellar Music Group	Quartet, Spike Wilner (piano), Peter Washington (bass), Joe Farnsworth (drums)
2024	Big George	Smoke Sessions	Septet, Jim Rotondi (trumpet), Steve Davis (trombone), Eric Alexander (alto sax/tenor sax), David Hazeltine (piano), John Webber (bass), Joe Farnsworth (drums)

=== As sideman ===
With Chet Baker

- Smokin' with the Chet Baker Quintet (Prestige, 1965)
- Groovin' with the Chet Baker Quintet (Prestige, 1965)
- Comin' On with the Chet Baker Quintet (Prestige, 1965)
- Cool Burnin' with the Chet Baker Quintet (Prestige, 1965)
- Boppin' with the Chet Baker Quintet (Prestige, 1965)

With Miles Davis

- Seven Steps to Heaven (Columbia, 1963)
- Miles Davis in Europe [live] (Columbia, 1963)
- Live at the 1963 Monterey Jazz Festival (Monterey Jazz Festival/Concord, 2007)
- My Funny Valentine [live] (Columbia, 1964)
- Four & More [live] (Columbia, 1964 [rel. 1966])

With Charles Earland

- Soul Crib (Choice, 1969)
- Smokin' (Muse, 1969/1977 [rel. 1977])
- Mama Roots (Muse, 1969/1977 [rel. 1977])

With Red Garland

- So Long Blues (Galaxy, 1979 [rel. 1981])
- Strike Up the Band (Galaxy, 1979 [rel. 1981])

With Slide Hampton

- Slide Hampton and His Horn of Plenty (Strand, 1959)
- Sister Salvation (Atlantic, 1960)
- Somethin' Sanctified (Atlantic, 1961)
- Jazz with a Twist (Atlantic, 1962)
- Drum Suite (Epic, 1962)
- Exodus (Philips, 1962 [rel. 1964])

With Ahmad Jamal

- The Essence Part One (Birdology/Verve, 1995)
- Ahmad Jamal à l'Olympia [live] (Dreyfus, 2000)

With Elvin Jones

- Live at the Village Vanguard (Enja, 1968)
- Poly-Currents (Blue Note, 1969)
- Coalition (Blue Note, 1970)
- Mr. Jones (Blue Note, 1973)
- Time Capsule (Vanguard, 1977)

With Booker Little

- Booker Little 4 and Max Roach (United Artists 1958)
- Booker Little and Friend (Bethlehem, 1961)

With Harold Mabern

- A Few Miles from Memphis (Prestige, 1968)
- Rakin' and Scrapin' (Prestige, 1968)
- Workin' & Wailin' (Prestige, 1969)

With Lee Morgan

- City Lights (Blue Note, 1957)
- Sonic Boom (Blue Note, 1966)

With Don Patterson

- Oh Happy Day (Prestige, 1969) – reissued on CD as Dem New York Dues
- Tune Up! (Prestige, 1969)

With Duke Pearson

- Honeybuns (Atlantic, 1965)
- Prairie Dog (Atlantic, 1966)

With Max Roach

- The Max Roach 4 Plays Charlie Parker (Emarcy, 1958)
- Max Roach + 4 on the Chicago Scene (Emarcy, 1958)
- Max Roach + 4 at Newport (Emarcy, 1958)
- Deeds, Not Words (Riverside, 1958)
- Award-Winning Drummer (Time, 1958)
- The Many Sides of Max (Mercury, 1959)

With Shirley Scott

- Lean on Me (Cadet, 1972)
- Queen Talk: Live at the Left Bank (Wienerworld/Cellar Live, 1972 [rel. 2023)

With Jimmy Smith

- House Party (Blue Note, 1957–58)
- The Sermon! (Blue Note, 1958)

With Roseanna Vitro

- Reaching for the Moon (Chase Music Group, 1991)
- Softly (Concord, 1993)

With Cedar Walton

- Eastern Rebellion (Timeless, 1975) – with Sam Jones, Billy Higgins
- Eastern Rebellion 5: Live (Timeless, 7/26/76 [rel. 2021])
- Eastern Rebellion 6: Live (Timeless, 7/20/76 [rel. 2024])

With others

- Roy Brooks, The Free Slave [live] (Muse, 1970 [rel. 1972])
- Paul (PB) Brown, Paul Brown Quartet Meets The Three Tenors (Brownstone, 1998)
- Terri Lyne Carrington, TLC and Friends (CEI, 1981)
- Brian Charette, Groovin' with Big G (Steeplechase, 2018) – with Vic Juris, George Coleman Jr.
- Joey DeFrancesco, Organic Vibes (Concord, 2005)
- Herbie Hancock, Maiden Voyage (Blue Note, 1965)
- Johnny Hartman, Today (Perception, 1972)
- Jazz Contemporaries, Reasons In Tonality (Strata-East, 1972)
- Jack McDuff, A Change Is Gonna Come (Atlantic, 1966)
- Howard McGhee, Sharp Edge (Fontana, 1966 [rel. Black Lion, 1977])
- Charles Mingus, Three or Four Shades of Blues (Atlantic, 1977)
- Idris Muhammad, Kabsha (Theresa, 1980)
- One for All, Big George (Smoke Sessions, 2022 [rel. 2024])
- John Patton, Memphis to New York Spirit (Blue Note, 1969)
- Nicholas Payton, Smoke Sessions (Smoke Sessions, 2021)
- Louis Smith, Just Friends (Steeplechase, 1982)
- Melvin Sparks, Akilah! (Prestige, 1972)
- Grady Tate, Movin' Day (Janus, 1974)
- Howard Tate, Howard Tate (Atlantic, 1972)
- Clark Terry's Big Bad Band, In Concert - Live (Etoile, 1973)
- Charles Tolliver, Impact (Strata-East, 1975)
- Mal Waldron, Sweet Love, Bitter (Impulse!, 1967)
- Lee Willhite, First Venture (Big Tampa Records, 1982)
- Reuben Wilson, Love Bug (Blue Note, 1969)
