= Katharine McPhee discography =

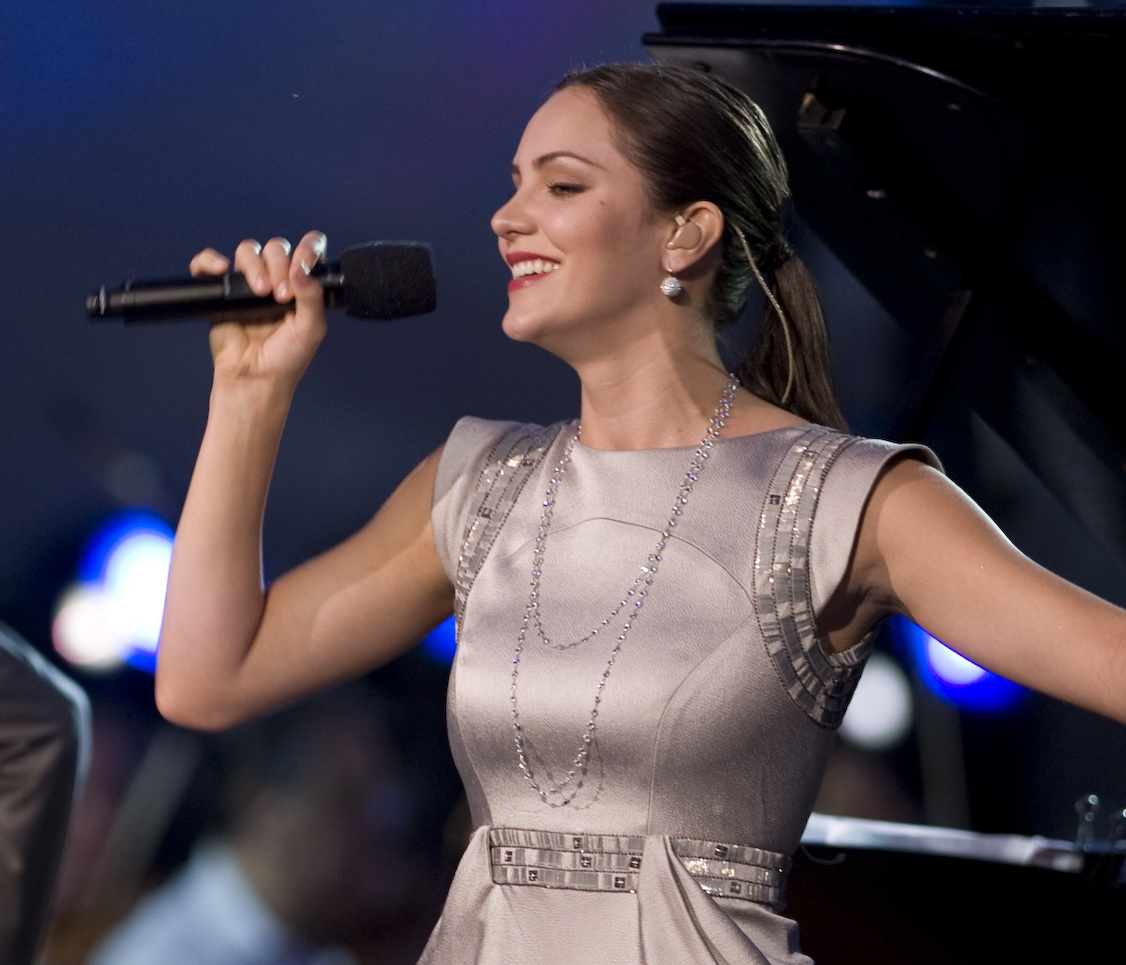
- McPhee at the National Memorial Day Concert in Washington, D.C., on May 24, 2009
- Studio albums: 4
- Singles: 10
- Music videos: 10

The discography of Katharine McPhee consists of four studio albums, ten singles, ten music videos, and other miscellaneous songs and albums.

== Albums ==
=== Studio albums ===
Title	Album details	Peak positions					Sales
Title	Album details	US	US Digital	US Holiday	US Indie	US Jazz	Sales
Katharine McPhee	Released: January 30, 2007; Label: RCA; Format: CD, digital download	2	2	—	—	—	US: 381,000
Unbroken	Released: January 5, 2010; Label: Verve Forecast; Format: CD, digital download	27	25	—	—	—	US: 45,000
Hysteria	Released: September 18, 2015; Label: eOne; Format: CD, digital download	—	—	—	37	—	
I Fall in Love Too Easily	Released: November 17, 2017; Label: BMG; Format: CD, digital download	—	—	—	27	2	

=== Christmas albums ===
Title	Album details
Christmas Is the Time to Say I Love You	Released: October 12, 2010; Label: Verve Forecast; Format: CD, digital download
Christmas Songs	Released: October 20, 2023; Label: Loma Vista; Format: CD, digital download

=== Appearances in other albums ===
Title	Album details	Peak positions			sales
Title	Album details	US	US Soundtracks	CAN	sales
The Music of Smash	Released: May 1, 2012; Label: Columbia; Format: CD, digital download	9	1	35	US: 112,000
Bombshell	Released: February 12, 2013; Label: Columbia; Format: CD, digital download	43	3	—	US: 26,000

== Extended plays ==
List of extended plays
Title	EP details
Christmas Songs	Released: November 25, 2022; Labels: Loma Vista; Format: CD, digital download

== Singles ==
- Sales under Sales column are for digital sales only.
- "Somewhere Over the Rainbow/My Destiny" was also sold as a physical single, which sold 169,000 copies.

Year	Single	Peak chart positions (Billboard)				RIAA cert	Sales	Album
Year	Single	US	US Pop	US AC	CAN	RIAA cert	Sales	Album
2006	"Somewhere Over the Rainbow"	12	12	—	—	—	131,000	Non-album singles
2006	"My Destiny"	60	42	—	—	—	98,000	Non-album singles
2006	"Think"	121	90	—	—	—	21,000	American Idol Season 5: Encores
2007	"Over It"	29	23	—	25	Gold	645,000	Katharine McPhee
2007	"Love Story"	—	—	—	—	—	92,000	Katharine McPhee
2009	"Had It All"	—	—	22	—	—	29,000	Unbroken
2009	"I'll Be Home for Christmas"	—	—	—	—	—	3,000	Non-album single
2010	"Have Yourself a Merry Little Christmas" (featuring Chris Botti)	—	—	16	—	—		Christmas Is the Time to Say I Love You
2015	"Lick My Lips"	—	—	—	—	—		Hysteria
2017	"Night and Day"	—	—	—	—	—		I Fall in Love Too Easily
2022	"Jingle Bell Rock" (with David Foster)	—	—	9	—	—		Christmas Songs
2023	"Carol of the Bells" (with David Foster)	—	—	10	—	—		Christmas Songs

=== Promotional singles ===
These songs charted from unsolicited airplay and/or sales on Billboard charts.

Year	Single	Sales	Album
2009	"Say Goodbye"	7,000	Unbroken
2009	"Lifetime"	5,000	Unbroken
2009	"How"	9,000	Unbroken
2010	"Terrified" (featuring Zachary Levi)		Non-album single

== Miscellaneous songs ==
- Sales numbers under Sales column for songs are for digital sales only
- unk - Sales unknown
- n/a - Not applicable (not released for sale as a digital single under that album)

=== Charted songs ===
Year	Song	Peak chart positions				Sales	Album
Year	Song	US	CA	NZ	US Dance Club	Sales	Album
2010	"We Are the World: 25 for Haiti" (Artists for Haiti)	2	8	17	—	580,000	Non-album single
2012	"Touch Me"	—	—	—	4	18,000	The Music of Smash (soundtrack)

=== Other songs ===
Year	Song	Sales	Album
2006	"Can't Help Falling in Love" (with Andrea Bocelli)	—N/a	Under the Desert Sky
2006	"Somewhere Over the Rainbow"	—N/a	J.C. Penney Jam: Concert for America's Kids
2006	"Somos Novios" (with Andrea Bocelli)	—N/a	J.C. Penney Jam: Concert for America's Kids
2007	"Better Off Alone"	34,000	Katharine McPhee
2007	"O Come All Ye Faithful"	19,000	O Come All Ye Faithful - Single
2008	"Real Love" (with Elliott Yamin)	8,000	Randy Jackson's Music Club, Vol. 1
2008	"I Will Be There With You"	—N/a	Promotional song for Japan Airlines
2008	"I Know What Boys Like"	9,000	I Know What Boys Like - Single
2008	"Connected"	5,000	Barbie and the Diamond Castle Original Movie Soundtrack
2008	"Let Your Heart Sing"	Unknown	Tinker Bell Original Movie Soundtrack
2008	"The Prayer" (with Andrea Bocelli)	Unknown	Hit Man: David Foster & Friends
2008	"Somewhere"	Unknown	Hit Man: David Foster & Friends
2009	"I've Got You Under My Skin"	Unknown	Chris Botti In Boston
2010	"Terrified" (with Jason Reeves)	41,000	Unbroken
2010	"You Are"	—N/a	UNCF's An Evening of Stars with Lionel Richie
2011	"Seems Like Yesterday"	Unknown	Peace, Love & Misunderstanding soundtrack
2012	"Beautiful"	15,000	Smash cast (single)
2012	"Let Me Be Your Star" (with Megan Hilty)	48,000	Smash cast (single)
2012	"Call Me"	Unknown	Smash cast (single)
2012	"The 20th Century Fox Mambo"	Unknown	Smash cast (single)
2012	"Redneck Woman"	Unknown	Smash cast (single)
2012	"It's a Man's Man's Man's World"	Unknown	Smash cast (single)
2012	"Cheers (Drink to That)" (with Megan Hilty)	Unknown	Smash cast (single)
2012	"Never Give All the Heart"	Unknown	Smash cast (single)
2012	"A Thousand and One Nights" (with Raza Jaffrey)	Unknown	Smash cast (single)
2012	"Smash!" (with Megan Hilty)	Unknown	Smash cast (single)
2012	"Don't Forget Me"	Unknown	Smash cast (single)
2012	"Shake It Out"	Unknown	The Music of Smash
2012	"Brighter Than the Sun"	Unknown	The Music of Smash
2012	"Our Day Will Come"	Unknown	The Music of Smash
2012	"Run"	Unknown	The Music of Smash
2012	"Stand"	Unknown	The Music of Smash
2013	"Cut, Print...Moving On"	Unknown	Bombshell
2013	"Our Little Secret" (with Julian Ovenden)	Unknown	Bombshell
2013	"Public Relations" (with Christian Borle)	Unknown	Bombshell
2013	"On Broadway" (with Jennifer Hudson)	Unknown	Smash cast (single)
2013	"Caught in the Storm"	Unknown	Smash cast (single)
2013	"Good For You"	Unknown	Smash cast (single)
2013	"Some Boys"	Unknown	Smash cast (single)
2013	"This Will Be Our Year" (with Jeremy Jordan, Andy Mientus, and Krysta Rodriguez)	Unknown	Smash cast (single)
2013	"Heart Shaped Wreckage" (with Jeremy Jordan)	11,000	Smash cast (single)
2013	"Rewrite This Story" (with Jeremy Jordan)	Unknown	Smash cast (single)
2013	"I Heard Your Voice In a Dream" (with Jeremy Jordan)	10,000	Smash cast (single)
2013	"Original"	unk	Smash cast (single)
2013	"That's Life" (with Megan Hilty)	12,000	Smash cast (single)
2013	"Don't Let Me Know" (with Jeremy Jordan)	Unknown	Smash cast (single)
2013	"The Goodbye Song" (with Jeremy Jordan and Krysta Rodriguez)	Unknown	Smash cast (single)
2013	"Pretender"	Unknown	Smash cast (single)
2013	"I'm Not Sorry" (with Mara Davi)	Unknown	Smash cast (single)
2013	"Under Pressure" (with Jeremy Jordan, Leslie Odom, Jr, Krysta Rodriguez, Christian Borle, Debra Messing, Megan Hilty, Jack Davenport, Anjelica Huston)	Unknown	Smash: The Complete Season 2
2013	"Would I Lie to You?" (with Megan Hilty)	Unknown	Smash: The Complete Season 2
2013	"Broadway, Here I Come!" (with Jeremy Jordan, Leslie Odom, Jr and Krysta Rodriguez)	Unknown	Smash: The Complete Season 2
2013	"Big Finish" (with Megan Hilty)	Unknown	Smash: The Complete Season 2

=== Songwriter credits ===
Year	Song	Artist	Album
2010	"Love's Never Leavin'" (co-written with Richard Marx)	Chelsea Field	non-album single
2012	"Beautiful Stranger" (co-written with David and Shauna Jackson)	Maila Gibson	You May Not Kiss the Bride (soundtrack)

== Music videos ==
Year	Song	Director
2007	"Over It"	Liz Friedlander
2007	"Love Story"	Marcus Raboy
2008	"Connected" (for Barbie and the Diamond Castle)	
2009	"Had It All"	Cyril Guyot
2010	"We Are the World: 25 for Haiti" featuring Artists for Haiti	Paul Haggis
2010	"Terrified" (featuring Zachary Levi)	Judson Pearce Morgan
2010	"Say Goodbye"	Judson Pearce Morgan
2010	"It's Not Christmas Without You"	Judson Pearce Morgan
2012	"Beautiful" (for Smash)	
2015	"Lick My Lips"	Diane Martel
