= Mike Metheny =

American jazz musician and journalist

- Born: August 28, 1949 (age 77); Lee's Summit, Missouri, U.S.
- Genres: Jazz, classical
- Occupations: Musician, music journalist, educator
- Instruments: Flugelhorn, trumpet, EVI
- Years active: 1970s–present
- Label: 3 Valve Music
- Website: www.mikemetheny.com

Mike Metheny (/məˈθiːni/ məth-EE-nee; born August 28, 1949) is an American jazz musician and music journalist. He is the older brother of the jazz guitarist Pat Metheny.

Mike Metheny studied music education at the University of Missouri School of Music and Northeast Missouri State University, then played trumpet in the U.S. Army Field Band, Washington D.C. (1971–74). Following his time in the Army, he became an adjunct lecturer and assistant to the head of the trumpet department at the Berklee College of Music (1976–83).

From 1978 to 1989 Metheny led his own Boston-based quartet, and in 1988 he was named "Outstanding Brass Player" at the annual Boston Music Awards.

== Career ==
Metheny has released twelve full-length albums, the first in 1982. He produced two records with major labels, in 1986 and 1987, to mixed reviews. Since 2000, his albums have been produced by his own record label, 3 Valve Music.

Metheny has pursued a career in music journalism since the early 1990s. He was editor for Kansas City's Jazz Ambassador Magazine (JAM) from 1994 to 2003 and has contributed to KC Magazine, Jazziz, and The DaCapo Jazz & Blues Lover's Guide to the U.S.

Commenting on Metheny's move from Boston to Missouri, and his transition to music journalism, the Boston Globe wrote in 1991, "Mike Metheny seemed on the verge of national recognition. He had a sweet sound, a gift for melody and three records under his name, two of them on a major label. Then he stopped." Metheny himself jokes that his career as a journalist is "an occupation that pays less than being a jazz musician".

He continues to perform, primarily in Kansas and Missouri, and with a particular emphasis on the electronic valve instrument (EVI), a trumpet synthesizer that he has featured in his recordings and which was given to him by his brother Pat as a present.

In 2007, Mike and Pat set up the Metheny Music Foundation of which Mike serves as the chairman. The foundation was established to "preserve, promote, and perpetuate an informed appreciation for all styles of music, honoring the history of the Metheny family through four generations and the rich musical heritage of the city of Lee's Summit, the state of Missouri, and the surrounding region."

In 2016, Mike Metheny published the anthology Old Friends Are the Best Friends: the Letters of John McKee and Mike Metheny. The book's foreword was written by Pat Metheny.

=== Pat Metheny ===
Mike Metheny is the older brother of jazz guitarist Pat Metheny. As the Los Angeles Times has pointed out, "Most of fluegelhornist Mike Metheny's career has been spent in the large shadow cast by his younger brother, guitarist Pat." Pat Metheny's greater level of success has not been lost on his brother. As Mike Metheny pointed out in a 1987 interview, at the height of his own music career, "there's a dramatic distinction between where [Pat] is and where I am... Pat is definitely in a class by himself". Notwithstanding, the Boston Globe writes that there is "not even an iota of intra-familial rivalry" between the pair.

Pat is five years younger than Mike. Before dedicating his life to guitar, Pat started playing trumpet at an early age, with older brother Mike as his teacher. Their father played trumpet, as did their mother's father, and with Mike informal trio sessions sometimes occurred. Pat has said that seeing them perform together, and seeing how much his brother practiced, had an important effect on him.

== Discography ==
- Blue Jay Sessions (Headfirst, 1982)
- Day In-Night Out (Impulse!, 1986) U.S. Top Jazz Albums No. 18
- Kaleidoscope (MCA, 1987) U.S. Top Jazz Albums No. 6
- From Then 'Til Now (Altenburgh 1989)
- Street of Dreams (Altenburgh, 1995)
- Close Enough for Love (3 Valve, 2001)
- KC Potpourri (3 Valve, 2003)
- Back to Basics (3 Valve, 2004)
- 60.1 (3 Valve, 2010)
- Old Wine/New Bossa: Selected Tracks (3 Valve, 2011)
- A Kansas City Trumpet Summit (3 Valve, 2013)
- Twelve for the Road (3 Valve, 2015)

=== As guest artist ===
- 1988 MCA Jazz Sampler: Spring into Summer Jazz Sampler '88, Various Artists
- 1991 Dreams Come True, Various Artists (flugelhorn)
- 1992 Secret Story, Pat Metheny (flugelhorn)
- 1992 I Didn't Know About You, Karrin Allyson (flugelhorn)
- 1995 Azure-Té, Karrin Allyson (flugelhorn)
- 1996 Collage, Karrin Allyson (flugelhorn)
- 1996 You Must Believe in Music, Gary Sivils (composer, EVI, liner notes, producer)
- 1997 There Will Never Be Another You, Rick Holland (liner notes)
- 1998 Odahoda, Interstring (liner notes)
- 1998 Special Request, Ida McBeth (liner notes)
- 2001 The Soundtrek Sessions, PBT Trio (EVI, cornet)
- 2002 A Simpler Christmas Time, The Leonard Brothers (flugelhorn)
- 2003 Jazz Trek: A Special Collection, Various Artists (flugelhorn)
- 2005 The Best of Kansas City Jazz: Volume 1, Various Artists (EVI)
- 2005 Live at KEXP, Vol. 1, Various Artists
- 2007 The Best of Kansas City Jazz: Volume 2, Various Artists (flugelhorn)
- 2007 The Flood and the Rainbow, Paul Hofmann (flugelhorn)
- 2007 Sound Advice, Andy Gravish (liner notes)
- 2007 Little Jazz Bird, Megan Birdsall (EVI)
- 2008 More Soundtrek Sessions, PBT Trio (flugelhorn, EVI)
- 2011 Tunnel Vision: A Collection of New Music, University of Missouri Concert Jazz Band (flugelhorn)
