= Blame It on My Youth =

Original song composed by Oscar Levant, lyrics by Edward Heyman

Song
- Published: 1934
- Genre: Jazz standard
- Composer: Oscar Levant
- Lyricist: Edward Heyman

"Blame It on My Youth" is a jazz standard written by Oscar Levant (music) and Edward Heyman (lyrics) in 1934.

== Recorded versions ==
- 1934: The Dorsey Brothers Orchestra (vocal by Bob Crosby) - recorded for Decca Records (catalog 320) on November 15, 1934.
- 1935: Bing Crosby - first broadcast by Crosby on his radio show Bing Crosby Entertains on February 5, 1935.
- 1935: Jan Garber and His Orchestra (vocal by Lee Bennett) - a popular record for RCA Victor.
- 1952: Gordon MacRae - a single release for Capitol Records.
- 1955: Rosemary Clooney - for her album While We're Young.
- 1956: Frank Sinatra – Recorded May 4, 1956 for Capitol album Close to You released 1957
- 1957: Nat King Cole - After Midnight
- 1956: Chris Connor - This Is Chris
- 1956: Mabel Mercer - Midnight at Mabel Mercer's
- 1957: Frank Sinatra - Close to You
- 1958: André Previn and David Rose – Secret Songs for Young Lovers
- 1958: George Shearing - Burnished Brass (instrumental version)
- 1958: Connie Stevens - Conchetta
- 1959: Tammy Grimes - Tammy Grimes
- 1959: Connie Francis - The Exciting Connie Francis
- 1960: Hank Garland - Velvet Guitar (instrumental version)
- 1960: Jeri Southern - At the Crescendo
- 1961: Sammy Davis Jr. - The Wham of Sam
- 1961: Buddy Greco - Songs for Swinging Losers
- 1961: Ann-Margret - And Here She Is ... Ann-Margret
- 1962: Vic Dana - Warm & Wild
- 1962: Julie London - Sophisticated Lady
- 1963: James Darren – "They Should Have Given You the Oscar" (Single B-side)
- 1964: John Davidson - The Young Warm Sound of John Davidson
- 1964: Carmen McRae - Second to None, Carmen's Gold (1971)
- 1964: Keely Smith - The Intimate Keely Smith
- 1965: Gloria Lynne - Intimate Moments
- 1969: The Golddiggers - The Golddiggers
- 1975: Charlie Byrd - Top Hat (instrumental version)
- 1981: Gary Burton Quartet - Easy as Pie (instrumental version)
- 1983: Keith Jarrett Trio - Standards Vol 2 (instrumental version)
- 1983: Art Farmer - Something Tasty (with Tommy Flanagan), Blame It on My Youth (1988) (instrumental versions)
- 1986: Michael Feinstein - Live at the Algonquin.
- 1989: Chet Baker - Chet Baker Sings and Plays from the Film "Let's Get Lost"
- 1991: Keith Jarrett Trio - The Cure (instrumental version)
- 1993: Holly Cole Trio - Don't Smoke in Bed
- 1993: David Silverman Trio - I Have Dreamed
- 1994: Karrin Allyson - Azure-Té
- 1994: Kenny Rankin - Professional Dreamer
- 1995: Lisa Ekdahl - When Did You Leave Heaven
- 1995: Fred Hersch & Jay Clayton - Beautiful Love
- 1995: Trine-Lise Væring - When I Close My Eyes
- 1997: Brad Mehldau - The Art of the Trio Volume One (Grammy Award nominated instrumental version)
- 1999: Keith Jarrett - The Melody at Night, with You (instrumental version)
- 2001: Michiel Borstlap - Gramercy Park (instrumental version)
- 2001: Kurt Elling - Flirting with Twilight
- 2001: Jane Monheit - Come Dream with Me
- 2001: Solveig Slettahjell - Slow Motion Orchestra
- 2001: Viktoria Tolstoy - Blame It on My Youth
- 2003: Aaron Neville - Nature Boy: The Standards Album
- 2004: Eden Atwood - This Is Always: The Ballad Session
- 2004: Jamie Cullum - Twentysomething
- 2004: Nancy Wilson - R.S.V.P. (Rare Songs, Very Personal)
- 2005: Steve Heckman Quartet - "Live at Yoshi's"
- 2005: The New Sound Quartet (Joe Locke, Geoffrey Keezer) - Summertime (instrumental version)
- 2008: Jennifer Leitham - "Left Coast Story"
- 2010: Ania Szarmach - Inna
- 2012: Nat Reeves - State of Emergency (instrumental version)
- 2012: Elisa Rodrigues - Heart Mouth Dialogues
- 2013: Paolo Fresu Devil Quartet - Desertico (instrumental version)
- 2014: Barry Manilow - for his album Night Songs
- 2017: Katharine McPhee - I Fall in Love Too Easily
- 2019: Petros Klampanis - Irrationalities

== Film appearances ==
- 1995 Let It Be Me - sung by Frank Sinatra.
- 1999 Eyes Wide Shut - performed by Brad Mehldau.
