= Azure-Te (Paris Blues) =

1952 blues ballad

Composition by Frank Sinatra
- Released: June 23, 1952
- Recorded: 3 June 1952
- Genre: blues
- Length: 2.36
- Label: Columbia
- Composer: Wild Bill Davis
- Lyricist: Donald E. Wolf

Azure-Te (Paris Blues) is a blues ballad written in 1952 by lyricist Donald E. Wolf for a Wild Bill Davis tune that reached number 30 on the Billboard Hot 100 chart in September 1952 when covered by Frank Sinatra.

The first release was by Louis Jordan's band, subsequent covers having been made by Nat King Cole with George Shearing, John Pizzarelli and others, and the Davis instrumental was also covered both in the 1950s and recently.

== Composition and recording ==
Music publisher Gale and Gayles had songwriter Donald E. Wolf write lyrics for the Wild Bill Davis instrumental composition Azure 'Te, released 29 February 1952, when they took on the tune from Crestwood Music.

The Frank Sinatra recording was made for Columbia on 3 June 1952 in Hollywood, in the same session as "The Birth of the Blues", "Bim Bam Baby", and two other songs. It was conducted by Axel Stordahl.

The personnel included:

- Frank Sinatra — vocals
- Bill Miller - piano
- Allan Reuss — guitar
- Jack Ryan — bass
- Alvin Stoller — drums
- Zeke Zarchy - trumpet
- Les Robinson, Babe Russin, Ted Nash, Chuck Gentry — tenor saxophones

The song was released on 23 July 1952 with "Bim Bam Baby" on the reverse.

== Reception ==
Billboard described the song as a "bluesy ballad", and found Stordahl's arrangement to be "outstanding" - however their verdict on Sinatra's vocals was that he was "not up to his best". Despite this, the song reached #30 on the Billboard Hot 100 chart on 27 September 1952. Others have described the recording as "lovely", and "riveting". According to producer Mitch Miller, Columbia Records hoped for a profitable release to make up for a sizeable advance payment to Sinatra (for a tax bill), but despite the quality of Azure Te and his other songs, they did not sell well at the time.

To evoke a Parisian feeling the arrangement uses a taxi horn rendering of a motif from Gershwin's American in Paris, and contrasts that with loud brass to invoke American swing, according to author Will Friedwald. Of Sinatra's ability to sing blues, he says Sinatra "does better with "Paris Blues"... than he does with "The Birth of the Blues".

== Name ==
The name Azure 'Te was first used on the original instrumental tune released by the Bill Davis Trio in March 1952. The subtitle Paris Blues first appeared a month after Bill Davis's instrumental on the B-side of the Tympany Five single Junco Partner, spelled Azure-Té (Paris Blues), which was the first recording of the tune to have Donald Wolf's lyrics. Frank Sinatra's subsequent cover of the song omitted the accent.

"Azure-Té" is not French and its meaning was unknown according to jazz critic Dave Gelly, who proposed that it be a misspelling of the French 'agité', meaning nervous, restless, agitated.

== Other versions ==
Wild Bill Davis is also heard on at least two other versions of the tune, including the Duke Ellington 70th Birthday Concert and the 1961 small group date Blue Hodge led by Ellington saxophonist Johnny Hodges.

The Tympany Five recording of April 1952, with Wolf's lyrics, was described as a "slow and sophisticated song", and the "best tune of the batch" in John Chilton's 1994 biography of band founder Louis Jordan.

Several other artists have recorded the tune, including Nat King Cole accompanied by George Shearing, having a "haunted beauty" for one reviewer, Kenny Burrell's unpretentious version based on a blues swing, and Karrin Allyson who named her third album after her version of the song. Other covers have been instrumentals, as was the original Bill Davis Trio release.

It was also featured in Five Guys Named Moe, a long-running Olivier Award-winning musical.

== Lyricist Don Wolf ==
The author of the Azure-Te lyrics was Donald Wolf (aka Donald E. Wolf or simply Don Wolf), a jazz and pop lyricist credited on over 300 recordings, including a number of top 100 charting songs, mainly in the US, including Love Is All We Need, which peaked at #15 on the Billboard Hot 100 in 1958 for Tommy Edwards, An ex-GI, Wolf started working as an administrative assistant at WMCA in 1949, moving on to supervise the pop music department at music publisher Merrymount Music Press in the 1950s.

Wolf's other successful songs include: Love Is All We Need, a song written jointly with Ben Raleigh which reached #15 when sung by Tommy Edwards in 1958, Vic Dana and Mel Carter also subsequently charting with it; Exclusively Yours, a song recorded by English singer Mark Wynter which reached #32 in the UK in 1961, following Carl Dobkins Jr. who reached #75 in the US in May 1960. "Until I Met You (Corner Pocket)" sung by The Manhattan Transfer who won the 1982 Grammy Award for Best Jazz Vocal Performance, Duo or Group with it, also recorded by Sarah Vaughan, Tony Bennett, Marvin Gaye the Four Tops and others. the 1958 The Playmates song Let's be lovers, and the 1957 million-copy selling Majesty of Love, recorded by Marvin Rainwater and Connie Francis.

A few of his songs have appeared in film, such as Now He Tells Me, performed by the King Cole Trio in film Killer Diller, Sleep Walk, set to the Santo & Johnny instrumental Sleep Walk used in the 2013 film The Conjuring, likewise the title songs of Fate Is the Hunter, in collaboration with Jerry Goldsmith, and John Goldfarb, Please Come Home! sung by Shirley MacLaine.
