= Stompin' at the Savoy =

1933 jazz standard composed by Edgar Sampson

Single by Chick Webb's Savoy Orchestra
- B-side: "Why Should I Beg For Love"
- Written: 1933
- Released: June 1934
- Recorded: May 18, 1934
- Genre: Swing
- Length: 3:10
- Label: Columbia
- Composer: Edgar Sampson
- Lyricist: Andy Razaf

"Stompin' at the Savoy" is a 1933 jazz standard composed by Edgar Sampson. It is named after the famed Harlem nightspot the Savoy Ballroom in New York City.

== History and composition ==
Although the song is often credited to Benny Goodman, Chick Webb, Edgar Sampson, and Andy Razaf, it was written and arranged by Sampson, Rex Stewart's alto saxophonist. Sampson wrote the song when he was with Stewart's orchestra at the Empire Ballroom in 1933. It was used as the band's theme song until the band broke up, after which Sampson joined Chick Webb's band, taking the song with him. Webb’s recording rose to number ten on the charts in 1934. Famously, on Webb's 1934 version (Columbia 2926) the tenor saxophone hits a wrong note after the introduction, however, Columbia did not cut another take. Two years later, the piece charted with versions by Ozzie Nelson and Benny Goodman.

Both Webb and Benny Goodman recorded it as an instrumental, Goodman's being the bigger hit. Goodman first recorded "Savoy" for the Rhythm Makers series for radio on June 5, 1935. His first commercially released version was on Victor 25247 with his full orchestra, recorded January 24, 1936. He recorded it again with his Quartet (Goodman, Gene Krupa, Teddy Wilson and Lionel Hampton) on December 2, 1936. This recording was released on Victor 25521. Lyrics were added by lyricist Andy Razaf. Goodman's 1936 version is written in 32-bar song form with four 8-bar phrases arranged AABA. The A sections use a Db6, Ab9, Db6, Ddim, Ebm7, Ab7, Db, Db chord sequence. The B section phrases use a Gb9/G9, Gb9, B13/F#m6, B13, E9/F9, E9, A13, Ab13 chord sequence. The tempo is medium fast.

Since becoming a jazz standard, the song has been recorded hundreds of times.

Ella Fitzgerald, Chick Webb's vocalist two years after "Savoy"'s release, sang the song in concert in 1957 in Los Angeles to great acclaim (Verve MG V-8264). Her version of the song is in the musical form of "scat" and has been widely hailed by fans of one of the single greatest examples of that form (references needed).

In 1992, Beverly M. Sawyer wrote a scenario from song Stompin' at the Savoy. American actress, dancer, choreographer, singer, director and producer Debbie Allen thus directed a 2 hour movie starring Vanessa Williams, Lynn Whitfield, Jasmine Guy and Vanessa Bell Calloway. The plot revolves around four young African-american women, who, in 1939 share an apartment. All three women frequent the happening Savoy Ballroom in New York City. Debbie Allen has a small role as a prostitute named Estelle. It was first broadcast on US television channel on CBS and again on NBC in 2018. It was distributed on VHS by CIC Victor Video in Japan in 1993. Choreographer Norma Miller was nominated for an Emmy award that year for Outstanding Individual Achievement in Choreography.

== Various versions ==
- Chick Webb, 1934
- Ozzie Nelson, 1936
- Benny Goodman, 1936
- Judy Garland, 1936
- Isham Jones, 1936
- Ink Spots, 1936
- Charlie Christian, 1941
- Django Reinhardt, 1944
- Art Tatum, 1941
- Glenn Miller and the AAFB, V-Disc, 1944
- Esquire All Stars, 1944
- Gene Krupa, 1945
- Art Tatum, The Art Tatum Solo Masterpieces Volume 5, 1953
- Clifford Brown and Max Roach, Brown and Roach Incorporated, 1954
- Maxine Sullivan with Jack Teagarden and the Charlie Shavers Ensemble, released 1956
- Anita O'Day, Pick Yourself Up with Anita O'Day, 1956
- Ella Fitzgerald and Louis Armstrong, Ella and Louis Again, 1956
- Art Pepper, Modern Art, 1956
- Louis Armstrong and Ella Fitzgerald, Ella and Louis Again, 1957
- Jim Hall, 1957
- Ahmad Jamal and Cal Tjader, 1958)
- Henri Salvador, Salvador plays the blues, 1959
- Wes Montgomery – One Night in Indy -Resonance- Recorded live in 1959 (released 2016)
- Ella Fitzgerald live, on her Ella at the Opera House album, 1958, edit: two distinct versions, one stereo recorded live in Chicago, one mono recorded live in LA.
- Ella Fitzgerald, 1958, Ella in Rome
- Sarah Vaughan, 1964
- Charlie Watts Orchestra, 1986, Live Fulham Town Hall
- Barry Manilow, Swing Street, 1987
- Harry Connick, Jr., When Harry Met Sally..., 1989
- The Boston Pops Orchestra under John Williams, 1991
- Karrin Allyson, Azure-Té, 1995
- Eddie Daniels, Swing Low Sweet Clarinet, 1999
- Nikki Yanofsky with Herbie Hancock and will.i.am, 2007
- Tony Glausi, My Favorite Tunes, 2020

== See also ==
- List of jazz standards (1930s)
