= Azure-Té =

Studio album by Karrin Allyson
- Released: March 21, 1995
- Recorded: November 14–16, 1994
- Studio: Soundtrek Studios, Kansas City, Missouri.
- Genre: Jazz
- Length: 61:34
- Label: Concord Jazz CCD-4641
- Producer: Danny Embrey, Karrin Allyson, Nick Phillips

Karrin Allyson chronology
Sweet Home Cookin' (1994)	Azure-Té (1995)	Collage (1996)

Professional ratings
Review scores
Source	Rating
Allmusic	4/5 stars
Encyclopedia of Popular Music	3/5 stars
The Penguin Guide to Jazz on CD	3/5 stars

Azure-Té is the third studio album by American jazz singer Karrin Allyson. The album was recorded in the Soundtrek Studios of Kansas City, Missouri and was released on March 21, 1995, by Concord Jazz label.

== Reception ==
Chuck Berg writing for JazzTimes commented, "Karrin Allyson's alluring Azure-Té is a gem. Here she takes the action back to her adopted home town with a cross-section of Kansas City's best and brightest." Scott Yanow of AllMusic noted that the album is "highly recommended."

== Track listing ==
No.	Title	Writer(s)	Length
1.	"How High the Moon / Ornithology"	Charlie Parker, Morgan Lewis	5:16
2.	"Gee, Baby, Ain't I Good to You"	Andy Razaf,Don Redman	4:34
3.	"Bernie's Tune"	Mike Stoller	4:12
4.	"Night and Day"	Cole Porter	5:28
5.	"Blame It on My Youth"	Oscar Levant	6:56
6.	"Yardbird Suite"	Charlie Parker	4:06
7.	"Good Morning Heartache"	Dan Fisher, Ervin Drake, Irene Higginbotham	5:55
8.	"Stompin' at the Savoy"	Andy Razaf, Benny Goodman, Chick Webb, Edgar Sampson	5:23
9.	"Azure-Té"	Don Wolf, Bill Davis	6:32
10.	"Some Other Time"	Leonard Bernstein	6:16
11.	"Samba '88"	Danny Embrey, Karrin Allyson	6:17
Total length:			61:34

== Personnel ==
- Karrin Allyson – vocals, piano (tracks: 7)
- Rod Fleeman – acoustic guitar (tracks: 2 4 7 9 11 12)
- Kim Park – alto saxophone (tracks: 3 6), tenor saxophone (tracks: 3 8)
- Bob Bowman – bass (tracks: 1 2 5 6 8 9)
- Gerald Spaits – bass (tracks: 3 10 11)
- Todd Strait – drums (tracks: 1 to 6, 8 to 11)
- Danny Embrey – electric guitar (tracks: 1 3 4 10 12)
- Mike Metheny – flugelhorn (tracks: 5)
- Stan Kessler – flugelhorn (tracks: 3)
- Randy Weinstein – harmonica (tracks: 9)
- Laura Caviani – piano (tracks: 3 10 11)
- Paul Smith – piano (tracks: 1 5 6 8)
- Stan Kessler – trumpet (tracks: 3)
- Claude Williams – violin (tracks: 2)
- Bryan Hicks – vocals (tracks: 3)
