= Corner Pocket =

1955 jazz standard

"Corner Pocket" is a 1955 jazz standard. Versions with lyrics are titled "Until I Met You", or "Until I Met You (Corner Pocket)".

It was composed by Freddie Green, with lyrics by Donald E. Wolf.

== Recordings ==
The song was first popularized in 1957 by Count Basie's instrumental recording for his album April in Paris. Sarah Vaughan sang the first vocal version with the Basie orchestra in 1961. A vocalese cover of this song was released by The Manhattan Transfer for their 1981 album Mecca for Moderns, which would earn them a Grammy Award. The vocalese lyrics are by Jon Hendricks.

Harry James recorded a version on his 1976 album The King James Version.

== See also ==
- List of jazz standards
