= I Fall in Love Too Easily (album) =

Studio album by Katharine McPhee
- Released: November 17, 2017
- Recorded: October 2016–August 2017 Los Angeles, California
- Studios: Capitol Studios and Henson Studios (Hollywood, California): Tinn-Tom Studios (Budapest, Hungary)
- Genre: Jazz
- Length: 40:39
- Label: BMG
- Producer: Don Was

Katharine McPhee chronology
Hysteria (2015)	I Fall in Love Too Easily (2017)

Singles from I Fall in Love Too Easily
- 1. "Night and Day" Released: October 5, 2017

I Fall in Love Too Easily is the fifth studio album by American singer Katharine McPhee. It was released on November 17, 2017 via BMG. The record was produced by Don Was, and features covers of romantic American standards. It was made available for pre-order on October 5, 2017.

== Background ==
In September 2016, McPhee announced that her next studio album was going to feature classic American standards under the supervision of Don Was. When asked about the project, McPhee shared: "They are songs I am inspired by. I've been inspired by them for a long time, these old standards, I've been singing since I was a little kid."

== Recording and inspiration ==
In December 2015, McPhee took part in a CBS special to celebrate Frank Sinatra’s 100th birthday - Sinatra 100: An All-Star Grammy Concert. McPhee and John Legend performed the opening medley of Sinatra's "You Make Me Feel So Young," "My Kind Of Town," and "You And Me (We Wanted It All)". Backstage, she met Don Was and discussed working with him on a project of music similar to what was performed that night. Was assembled a band for them to perform a few concerts at bars in California before heading into the studio together.

She recorded the album in the Capitol Records Building in a studio that included equipment used by Sinatra on his recordings.

== Title ==
On October 5, 2017 in an Instagram and Facebook live, Katharine revealed that her album would be titled I Fall in Love Too Easily, and explained that it had been suggested by producer Don Was. She later admitted that I Fall in Love Too Easily was a fitting title because, "...it's the truth."

== Singles ==
The first single, "Night and Day" was made available for free via SoundCloud, and premiered on Entertainment Weekly's website; it was later added to other streaming sites, and made available for purchase on iTunes. The track was also released as an instant download with the pre-order of the album on iTunes, and amazon.

== Track listing ==
I Fall in Love Too Easily track listing
No.	Title	Writer(s)	Length
1.	"All The Way"	Jimmy Van Heusen • Sammy Cahn	3:57
2.	"I'll Be Seeing You/ Some Other Time" (Medley)	Sammy Fain • Irving Kahal • Leonard Bernstein • Betty Comden • Adolph Green	5:39
3.	"Night and Day"	Cole Porter	5:09
4.	"I Fall in Love Too Easily"	Jule Styne • Sammy Cahn	3:52
5.	"Everything Must Change"	Bernard Ighner	3:29
6.	"I've Grown Accustomed to His Face"	Frederick Loewe • Alan Jay Lerner	2:44
7.	"Sooner or Later"	Stephen Sondheim	3:07
8.	"Who Can I Turn To?"	Leslie Bricusse • Anthony Newley	4:04
9.	"It Never Entered My Mind"	Richard Rodgers • Lorenz Hart	4:29
10.	"Blame It on My Youth/ You Make Me Feel So Young" (Medley)	Oscar Levant • Edward Heyman • Josef Myrow • Mack Gordon	4:09
Total length:			40:39

– Sources:

== Personnel ==
- Katharine McPhee – vocals
- Alan Pasqua – grand piano, track arrangements
- John Clayton – double bass
- Darek Oles – double bass
- Reuben Rogers – double bass
- Peter Erskine – drums
- Joe LaBarbera – drums
- Alex Budman – saxophones
- Francisco Torres – trombone
- Michael Stever – trumpet
- Jeremy Levy – horn arrangements, string arrangements
- Péter Illéyni – conductor
- Balázs Bujtor – concertmaster

=== Production ===
- Randy Cohen – executive producer
- Don Was – producer
- Al Schmitt – recording, mixing
- Steve Genewick – engineer
- Chandler Harrod – engineer
- Támas Kurina – engineer
- Derrick Stockwell – engineer
- Eric Boulanger – mastering at The Bakery (Culver City, California)
- Ivy Skoff – production coordinator
- Rachel Jones – production assistant
- Cassondra Massa – product manager
- Amanda Demme – cover photography

== Charts ==
Chart performance for I Fall in Love Too Easily
Chart (2017)	Peak position
US Independent Albums (Billboard)	27
US Top Jazz Albums (Billboard)	2
