= I Ain't Got Nothin' but the Blues =

1944 song composed by Duke Ellington

"I Ain't Got Nothin' but the Blues" is a 1944 song composed by Duke Ellington, with lyrics written by Don George.

== Notable recordings ==
- Duke Ellington and His Famous Orchestra Voc.: Al Hibbler - Recorded in New York City on December 1, 1944. It was released by RCA Victor Records as catalogue number 20-1623B
- Ella Fitzgerald - Ella Fitzgerald Sings the Duke Ellington Songbook (1957)
- Dinah Shore - included on the album Dinah Sings Some Blues with Red (1960)
- Ella Fitzgerald, Joe Pass - Fitzgerald & Pass... Again (1976)
- Sarah Vaughan - The Duke Ellington Songbook, Vol. 2 (1979)
- Robben Ford - Talk to Your Daughter (1988)
- Roseanna Vitro - Softly (1993)
- Karrin Allyson – Daydream (1997)
- E.G. Kight - Takin' It Easy (2004)

== See also ==
- List of 1940s jazz standards
