= Sweet Home Cookin' =

Sweet Home Cookin

Studio album by Karrin Allyson
- Released: March 1, 1994
- Recorded: June 9–10, 1993, and September 9, 1993
- Studio: Sage & Sound Recording, Hollywood, CA; Soundtrek, Kansas City, MO
- Genre: Jazz
- Length: 1:00:33
- Label: Concord Jazz CCD-4593
- Producer: Danny Embrey, Karrin Allyson

Karrin Allyson chronology
| I Didn't Know About You (1992) | Sweet Home Cookin (1994) | Azure-Té (1995) |

Sweet Home Cookin' is the second studio album by American jazz singer Karrin Allyson. The album was recorded at Sage & Sound Recording, Hollywood, California on June 9–10, 1993, and at Soundtrek, Kansas City, Missouri, on September 9, 1993. The record was released on March 1, 1994, via Concord Jazz label.

== Reception ==
Professional ratings
Review scores
| Source | Rating |
|---|---|
| AllMusic | 4.5/5 stars |
| The Encyclopedia of Popular Music | 3/5 stars |

Scott Yanow of AllMusic stated: "Karrin Allyson has a small and sometimes hoarse voice but she does so much with it that her bop session is easily recommended. Her all-star sextet ... has plenty of short solos on colorful charts by Alan Broadbent. Allyson sounds perfectly at ease, whether scatting on 'No Moon at All,' finding fresh melodic variations on 'I Cover the Waterfront,' or singing her original blues 'Sweet Home Cookin' Man.' She always swings." Doug Ramsey in his review for JazzTimes commented: "Although there is no evidence of strain or intonation problems in her voice, it loses body on some low notes, probably a consequence of aiming below her true range."

== Track listing ==
| No. | Title | Writer(s) | Length |
|---|---|---|---|
| 1. | "One Note Samba" | Jon Hendricks, Antônio Carlos Jobim, Newton Mendonça | 3:40 |
| 2. | "I Cover the Waterfront" | Johnny Green, Edward Heyman | 5:56 |
| 3. | "Can't We Be Friends?" | Paul James, Kay Swift | 3:28 |
| 4. | "Yeh! Yeh!" | Jon Hendricks, Pat Patrick | 4:20 |
| 5. | "Goodbye Pork Pie Hat" | Charles Mingus | 5:22 |
| 6. | "No Moon at All" | Redd Evans, Dave Mann | 4:19 |
| 7. | "Sweet Home Cookin' Man" | Karrin Allyson | 6:11 |
| 8. | "You Are Too Beautiful" | Lorenz Hart, Richard Rodgers | 5:34 |
| 9. | "Social Call" | Gigi Gryce, Jon Hendricks | 4:46 |
| 10. | "Dindi" | Ray Gilbert, Antônio Carlos Jobim | 8:02 |
| 11. | "In a Sentimental Mood" | Duke Ellington, Manny Kurtz, Irving Mills | 5:28 |
| 12. | "I Love Paris" | Cole Porter | 3:27 |
| Total length: | | | 01:00:33 |

== Personnel ==
- Karrin Allyson – vocals
- Randy Sandke – trumpet
- Bob Cooper – tenor sax
- Danny Embrey – guitar
- Alan Broadbent – piano
- Putter Smith – bass
- Sherman Ferguson – drums
