= Daydream (Karrin Allyson album) =

Studio album by Karrin Allyson
- Released: August 19, 1997
- Recorded: 5 January 1996; 10–14 March 1997; 17 March 1997; 24–25 April 1997
- Studio: Soundtrek Studios, Kansas City; Sound on Sound Studios, NYC; A Wing & A Prayer Productions, Central Point, Oregon
- Genre: Jazz
- Length: 63:15
- Label: Concord Jazz CCD-4773
- Producer: Nick Phillips

Karrin Allyson chronology
Collage (1996)	Daydream (1997)	From Paris to Rio (1999)

Professional ratings
Review scores
Source	Rating
Allmusic	4/5 stars
Encyclopedia of Popular Music	3/5 stars
The Penguin Guide to Jazz on CD	3/5 stars

Daydream is the fifth studio album by American jazz singer Karrin Allyson. The album was released on August 19, 1997, by Concord Jazz label. The recording locations were: Soundtrek Studios in Kansas City, Sound on Sound Studios in NYC, and A Wing & A Prayer Productions in Central Point, Oregon.

== Reception ==
In his review for AllMusic, Scott Yanow commented, "Karrin Allyson has a beautiful voice that is also quite flexible, as she shows throughout this consistently interesting release. The emphasis is a little more on ballads than usual, but there are some heated moments too."All About Jazz review stated, "This excellent CD reminds us that Allyson isn't just a pop singer with some jazz influence—she's a improvising, hard swinging jazzer who can blow with the spontaneity of a saxophonist. And if you doubt it, just check out how passionately and freely she swings on everything..."

== Track listing ==
No.	Title	Writer(s)	Length
1.	"Day Dream"	Duke Ellington, John Latouche, Billy Strayhorn	04:36
2.	"Like Someone in Love"	Johnny Burke, James Van Heusen	05:50
3.	"My Foolish Heart"	Ned Washington, Victor Young	07:46
4.	"So Danço Samba"	Antonio Carlos Jobim	5:26
5.	"Corcovado (Quiet Nights)"	Antonio Carlos Jobim	6:57
6.	"Show Me"	Alan Jay Lerner, Frederick Loewe	3:40
7.	"Monk Medley (Straight No Chaser / Blue Monk / I Mean You)"	Thelonious Monk	6:23
8.	"Everything Must Change"	Benard Ighner	6:45
9.	"Donna Lee / (Back Home Again In) Indiana"	Charlie Parker, James F. Hanley	4:44
10.	"I Ain't Got Nothin' but the Blues"	Duke Ellington	6:59
11.	"You Can't Rush Spring"	Ann Hampton Callaway	4:14
Total length:			63:15
