= E.G. Kight =

American singer-songwriter

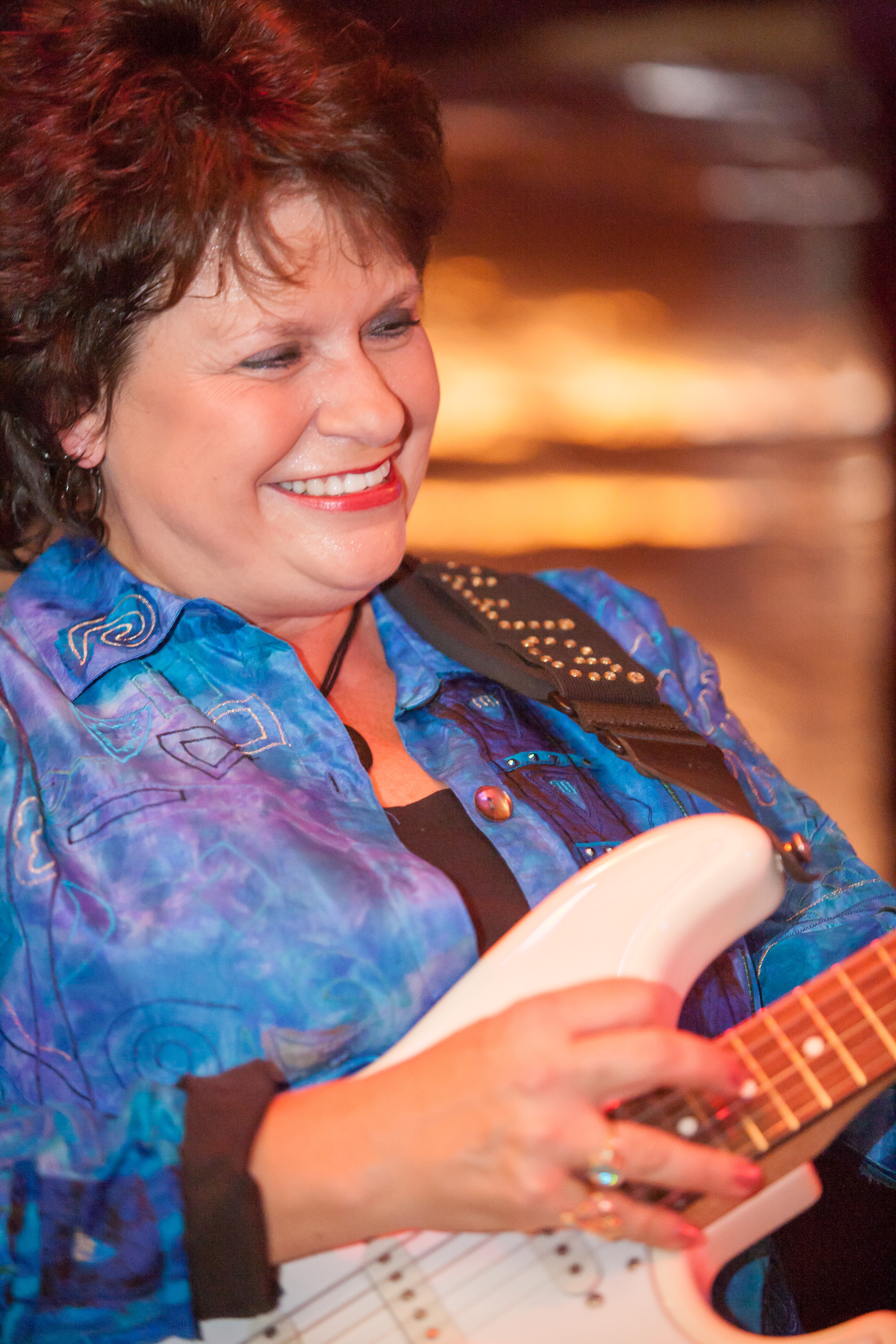
- E.G. Kight on stage (2007)

Background information
- Also known as: The Georgia Songbird
- Born: Eugenia Gail Kight; January 17, 1966 (age 59); Dublin, Georgia, United States
- Genres: Chicago blues
- Occupation(s): Singer, guitarist, songwriter
- Instrument(s): Guitar, vocals
- Years active: 1980s–present
- Labels: Blue South, M.C. Records
- Website: www.egkight.com

E.G. Kight (born January 17, 1966) is an American Chicago blues singer, guitarist and songwriter. She has worked with many musicians, including George Jones, Jerry Lee Lewis, Conway Twitty, Merle Haggard, Luther Allison, Hubert Sumlin, Pinetop Perkins, Taj Mahal, B.B. King, and Koko Taylor. Kight has recorded seven albums to date and received several nominations for Blues Music Awards, in the categories Contemporary Female Artist and Song of the Year.

Kight is billed as "The Georgia Songbird". Her main musical influence was Koko Taylor.

== Life and career ==
Eugenia Gail Kight was born in Dublin, Georgia. At the age of five her grandmother taught her to play the guitar. In her youth she watched Elvis Presley perform in Macon, Georgia. Initially raised on a musical diet of gospel and country music, she gravitated towards the blues after hearing a recording of Koko Taylor. Already a professional musician in her mid-teens, Kight moved away from playing country songs and began her career in Chicago blues. She appeared regularly on the television program Nashville Now in 1989 and toured extensively in the late 1990s and into the new millennium.

Her 1997 album, Come into the Blues, includes a version of "I've Been Loving You Too Long". In 2002, she performed at the ceremony when a statue of the song's writer, Otis Redding, was unveiled at the Georgia Music Hall of Fame. The same year, Blue South Records released Trouble. Southern Comfort followed the next year, with Chuck Leavell playing piano; the album contained her cover version of John Prine's "Angel from Montgomery".

In 2004, she released Takin' It Easy, which included, along with her own compositions, covers of Duke Ellington's "I Ain't Got Nothin' but the Blues" and the Allman Brothers Band's "Southbound." Guest musicians on the album were Ann Rabson, Chris Hicks (of the Marshall Tucker Band), and Greg Piccolo (formerly with Roomful of Blues). In the same year she was nominated for three Blues Music Awards.

On Kight's 2008 album, It's Hot in Here, released by M.C. Records, she wrote or co-wrote most of the tracks. It attained number one on the root blues chart and on Sirius XM Radio.

Prior to Kight's album release, Lip Service (2011), she had two stays in hospital due to a combination of meningitis and encephalitis. The album again had musical and production input from Paul Hornsby and contained "Koko's Song", a tribute to Taylor. The album also had her duet with John Németh.

Her songs have been recorded by Taylor, Dorothy Moore, Saffire – The Uppity Blues Women, and Shakura S'Aida. She endorses Taylor Guitars. Kight continues to live in Dublin, Georgia, on land that has belonged to her family for four generations.

== Discography ==
=== Solo albums ===
Year	Title	Record label
1997	Come into the Blues	Blue South
2002	Trouble	Blue South
2003	Southern Comfort	Blue South
2004	Takin' It Easy	Blue South
2007	EG Live and Naked	Blue South
2008	It's Hot in Here	M.C. Records
2011	Lip Service	Blue South/Vizzitone
2014	A New Day	Blue South

== See also ==
- List of Chicago blues musicians
