= Many a New Day: Karrin Allyson Sings Rodgers & Hammerstein =

Studio album by Karrin Allyson
- Released: September 18, 2015
- Recorded: May 1–2, 2015
- Studio: Sear Sound, New York City, New York
- Genre: Jazz
- Length: 53:40
- Label: Motéma Music
- Producer: Karrin Allyson; Michael Leonhart

Karrin Allyson chronology
NYC Sessions (2015)	Many a New Day: Karrin Allyson Sings Rodgers & Hammerstein (2015)	Some of That Sunshine (2018)

Many a New Day: Karrin Allyson Sings Rodgers & Hammerstein is an album by Karrin Allyson recorded in tribute to the songwriting partnership of Richard Rodgers and Oscar Hammerstein II. It earned Allyson a Grammy Award nomination for Best Jazz Vocal Album. Many a New Day peaked at 13 on the Billboard Jazz albums chart.

== Reception ==
Christopher Loudon reviewed Many a New Day for the Jazz Times in October 2015 and wrote, "At last, the Hammerstein portion of the Rodgers canon is getting serious, full-length appreciation...There's no room on this album for splashy solos or virtuosic grandstanding. The focus is squarely on sensitive, intelligent arrangements shaped around Allyson's unique sound—slightly parched and gently tremulous—expressly built to exalt a spectrum of instantly familiar yet largely underappreciated gems. An exquisitely thoughtful trio album, it's also an important one". C. Michael Bailey reviewed the album for AllAboutJazz and gave it 4.5 stars out of 5.

== Track listing ==
All tracks are written by Richard Rodgers and Oscar Hammerstein II, except "Something Good", words and music by Richard Rodgers.

No.	Title	Length
1.	"Oh! What a Beautiful Mornin'"	4:07
2.	"Many a New Day"	2:57
3.	"Happy Talk"	3:50
4.	"I Cain't Say No"	4:16
5.	"I Have Dreamed"	4:53
6.	"Out of My Dreams"	3:32
7.	"Bali Ha'i"	5:04
8.	"When I Think of Tom/Hello Young Lovers"	4:31
9.	"We Kiss in a Shadow"	4:35
10.	"You've Got to Be Carefully Taught"	4:08
11.	"Something Wonderful"	2:33
12.	"The Surrey with the Fringe on Top"	3:29
13.	"Something Good"	3:16
14.	"Edelweiss"	2:29
Total length:		53:40

== Musicians ==
- Karrin Allyson – Vocals
- Kenny Barron – Piano
- John Patitucci – Double Bass

== Production ==
- Karrin Allyson – Producer, Arranger
- Michael Leonhart – Producer
- Associate Producer – Bill McGlaughlin
- Jana Herzen – Executive Producer
- Katherine Miller – Recording Engineer, Mixer
- Grant Valentine – Assistant Engineer
- Robin Tomchin – Project Management
- Rachel Silton – Project Management
- Seth Cohen – Publicity
- Cynthia Herbst – Artist Management
- Ingrid Hertfelder – Photography
- Stephany Perez – Make Up & Hair
- Karen Perez – Stylist
- Rebecca Meek – Graphic Design

Track information and credits adapted from the album's liner notes.
