= I Didn't Know About You (album) =

Studio album by Karrin Allyson
- Released: 1992
- Studio: Soundtrek studios, Kansas City, MO
- Genre: Chamber jazz
- Length: 1:00:09
- Label: Concord Jazz CCD-4543
- Producer: Danny Embrey, Karrin Allyson

Karrin Allyson chronology
I Didn't Know About You (1992)	Sweet Home Cookin' (1993)

I Didn't Know About You is the debut studio album by American jazz singer Karrin Allyson. The album was released in 1992 via Concord Jazz label. She has remained with Concord Jazz for her next 13 albums issued through 2011.

== Reception ==
Professional ratings
Review scores
Source	Rating
AllMusic	4/5 stars
The Encyclopedia of Popular Music	4/5 stars
Tom Hull	B
The Virgin Encyclopedia of Jazz	4/5 stars

Jack Fuller of the Chicago Tribune stated: "This young singer is terrific. Part cabaret, part Cassandra Wilson, Karrin Allyson has a lovely musical range and a sharp, clear, slightly nasal voice which is capable of stunning scat and other instrumental effects as well as the straight, lyrical approach. Here, she also shows her gifts as an arranger. Some of the interplay she sets up with the small group with which she performs is memorable."

Scott Yanow of AllMusic wrote: "This CD was the debut of the talented singer Karrin Allyson, a creative scat singer also very capable of holding her own on ballads. She primarily utilizes top Kansas City musicians (including pianists Paul Smith, Russ Long and Joe Cartwright, guitarists Danny Embrey and Rod Fleeman, bassists Bob Bowman and Gerald Spaits, drummer Todd Strait, cornetist Gary Sivils and flugelhornist Mike Metheny) on a variety of bop-based material. Among the highlights are 'Nature Boy,' Karrin's chancetaking duet with drummer Strait on 'What a Little Moonlight Can Do,' a rapid version of ''S Wonderful' and a bossa-novatized 'It Might As Well Be Spring.' Karrin Allyson, who also plays piano on three numbers, shows a great deal of potential throughout her rewarding debut."

== Track listing ==
No.	Title	Writer(s)	Length
1.	"Nature Boy"	eden ahbez	6:17
2.	"I Didn't Know What Time It Was"	Lorenz Hart, Richard Rodgers	4:27
3.	"Chopin Prelude Op. 28 No. 4 / Insensatez (How Insensitive)"	Frédéric Chopin, Norman Gimbel, Antônio Carlos Jobim	6:25
4.	"(Pack Your) Suitcase Blues"	Karrin Allyson	3:16
5.	"I Didn't Know About You"	Duke Ellington, Bob Russell	4:28
6.	"Line for Lyons"	Gerry Mulligan	3:38
7.	"Jesse"	Janis Ian	4:26
8.	"What a Little Moonlight Can Do"	Harry Woods	2:32
9.	"I Don't Stand a Ghost of a Chance With You"	Bing Crosby, Ned Washington, Victor Young	5:50
10.	"'S Wonderful"	George Gershwin, Ira Gershwin	4:27
11.	"Save That Time"	Russ Long	3:44
12.	"Guilty"	Randy Newman	5:28
13.	"It Might as Well Be Spring"	Oscar Hammerstein II, Richard Rodgers	5:11
Total length:			01:00:09

== Personnel ==
Band

- Karrin Allyson – piano, vocals, producer
- Doug Auwarter – percussion
- Bob Bowman – bass
- Joe Cartwright – piano
- Danny Embrey – guitar (electric), producer
- Rod Fleeman – guitar (acoustic)
- Bryan Hicks – vocals
- Russ Long – composer, piano
- Mike Metheny – flugelhorn
- Gary Sivils – cornet
- Paul E. Smith – piano
- Gerald Spaits – bass
- Todd Strait – drums, percussion

Production

- John Blank – engineer
- Bill McGlaughlin – liner notes
- Ron Ubel – engineer
