= Had It All =

Single by Katharine McPhee

from the album Unbroken
- Released: August 25, 2009
- Recorded: 2009
- Genre: Pop rock
- Length: 3:04
- Label: Verve Forecast
- Songwriters: Kara DioGuardi; David Hodges; Mitch Allan

Katharine McPhee singles chronology
"Love Story" (2007)	"Had It All" (2009)	"I'll Be Home for Christmas" (2010)

"Had It All" is the first single from American singer Katharine McPhee's second studio album, Unbroken, which was released on January 5, 2010. The song was first released to McPhee's Myspace page and iTunes on August 25, 2009 and then to AC and Hot AC radio on September 21, 2009. The mid-tempo pop rock song was written by David Hodges, Mitch Allan, and Kara DioGuardi. McPhee describes the song as being about "a girl that went out to look for a different love and thought that she could find something better and realized at the end 'Wow, I really had it all.'" She also says the song is very much upbeat and with a "positive vibe to it."

Hodges, Allan, and Dioguardi also recorded a live demo version, which can be viewed on YouTube.

== Critical reception ==
The song has been received with generally positive reviews. Katie Hasty from Hitfix described the song as "warm, percussive but not dancey, and a little bit more soulful than sultry," and commented on its country-crossover appeal, adding "If there was pedal steel and a twang in the back of her throat, this would be a modern country hit." Reviewers at Idol Live repeated the praises and commented on the "indie vibes the got from the song, saying that "her vocals glide seamlessly." They commented especially on the bridge, saying that she "harkens back to her days on 'Idol' with a building, billowing high note that carries through the song's remainder, and finally settles on a crisp, calm finale."

== Charts ==
Chart (2009)	Peak position
U.S. Billboard Adult Contemporary	22

"Had It All" has sold 25,000 copies to date in the United States.

== Music video ==
The music video for "Had It All" was filmed in Saugus, California on August 19 by Cyril Guyot. There were several different looks for McPhee during the filming for the music video. Scenes filmed include McPhee in a tight black dress leaning against a white backdrop with her hair slicked back. Others have been seen with McPhee in different outfits with straight hair in a desert-like area. The video premiered on Yahoo Music on October 13, 2009.
