= Hysteria (Katharine McPhee album) =

Studio album by Katharine McPhee
- Released: September 18, 2015
- Genre: Pop
- Length: 40:40
- Label: eOne
- Producer: Isabella Summers, Smith Carlson

Katharine McPhee chronology
Christmas Is the Time to Say I Love You (2010)	Hysteria (2015)	I Fall in Love Too Easily (2017)

Singles from Hysteria
- 1. "Lick My Lips" Released: May 26, 2015

Hysteria, the fourth studio album by Katharine McPhee, was released via eOne on Friday, September 18, 2015. The album features collaborations with Ryan Tedder, Sia, Isabella Summers, and more.

== Singles ==
The first single, "Lick My Lips," and its music video were released on May 26, 2015.

== Track listing ==
No.	Title	Writer(s)	Producer(s)	Length
1.	"Hysteria"	Katharine McPhee; Kelly Sheehan; Isabella Summers	Isabella Summers	3:23
2.	"Feather"	Luke Atlas; Tim Fagan; Lindsey Lee Taylor	Luke Atlas	2:52
3.	"Burn"	McPhee; Sheehan; Summers	Summers	4:08
4.	"Stranger Than Fiction"	McPhee; Smith Carlson; Ali Tamposi; Ryan Tedder	Smith Carlson	3:31
5.	"Lick My Lips"	Summers; Marcus Miller; Sam Sparro; Luther Vandross	Summers	2:34
6.	"Break"	McPhee; Drew Pearson; Wrabel	Jon Castelli, Aaron Joseph	3:26
7.	"Appetite"	McPhee; Taylor; Sophia Black; Jon Castelli; Aaron Joseph	Castelli, Joseph	3:11
8.	"Love Strikes"	McPhee; Ginny Blackmore; Matthew Marston; Rob Wells	Wells	3:36
9.	"Round Your Little Finger"	McPhee; Chris Braide; Sia Furler	Braide	3:38
10.	"Only One"	McPhee; Sheehan; Chris Loco	Castelli, Joseph	4:02
11.	"Damage Control"	McPhee; Jon Bellion; Jon Levine; Andrew McMahon	Slaptop	3:01
12.	"Don't Need Love"	McPhee; Sheehan; Summers	Summers	3:18
Total length:				40:40

== Personnel ==
Credits adapted from Allmusic.com

- Katharine McPhee – vocal, primary artist
- Christopher Braide – mixing, producer
- Smith Carlson – producer
- Jon Castelli – additional production, mixing, producer
- Chris Galland – assistant
- Paul Grosso – creative director
- Kuk Hurrell – vocal producer
- Aaron Joseph – producer
- Andrew Kelly – art direction, design
- Manny Marroquin – mixing
- Tony Maserati – mixing
- Ike Schultz – assistant
- Dove Shore – photography
- Slaptop – mixing, producer
- Sam Sparro – additional production
- Isabella Summers – producer
- Rob Wells – producer

== Charts ==
Chart performance for Hysteria
Chart (2015)	Peak position
US Independent Albums (Billboard)	37
