= Unbroken (Katharine McPhee album) =

Studio album by Katharine McPhee
- Released: January 5, 2010
- Recorded: 2008–2009
- Studios: The Village Recorder (Los Angeles, California); The Bank (Burbank, California); Cookie Jar Recording (Studio City, California); JHL Sound (Pacific Palisades, California).
- Genre: Pop
- Length: 47:15
- Label: Verve Forecast
- Producers: John Alagía, Martin Bishop, Daniel Lloyd, Katherine McPhee, Boots Ottestad

Katharine McPhee chronology
Katharine McPhee (2007)	Unbroken (2010)	Christmas Is the Time to Say I Love You (2010)

Singles from Unbroken
- 1. "Had It All" Released: August 25, 2009

Unbroken is the second studio album from American Idol season five runner-up Katharine McPhee. The album was released on January 5, 2010, by Verve Forecast Records, her first album on the label. It debuted at number 27 on the Billboard 200, selling 15,000 copies in its first week. As of January 2011, the album has sold 45,000 copies in the US.

== Background ==
After McPhee was dropped from RCA Records, she was signed to Verve Forecast Records, part of the Verve Music Group under Universal Music Group. Verve Music Group president/CEO Bruce Resnikoff told Billboard, "The album she is working on will show many new sides to her talents as an interpreter and a songwriter, and show everyone just how special she is."

For her debut album, McPhee co-wrote three songs. She has had much more involvement in the writing process of this album, with writing credits on six of the songs.

After months of recording, the album process was completed on August 21. When asked to describe the album, McPhee has been quoted as saying that an "organic," "edgy," and more "adult" sound will be prominent on the album.

Inspired by the new label and new album, McPhee traded in her long brunette hair for a short blonde do and made it part of the promotion for the album, with an exclusive "First Look" in People Magazine.

Behind the scenes videos from recording at the Village have been posted on McPhee's MySpace.

The album was set for release on October 6, 2009, but in September, it got pushed back to January 5, 2010, due to scheduling conflicts (McPhee confirmed the new date and explanation in a video on her website).

== Singles ==
"Had It All" was released as the first and only radio single from the album. It was released on McPhee's MySpace page and to iTunes for purchase on August 25, 2009, and to AC and Hot AC radio on September 21. It peaked at number 22 on Billboard's Adult Contemporary chart. The official music video premiered on the music video site Vevo on October 13, 2009. "Had It All" has sold 29,000 downloads to date in the United States.

=== Promotional singles ===
- "Say Goodbye": The song was released on September 15, 2009, on McPhee's Myspace page and for purchase on iTunes and was not released to radio. On October 4, 2010, the official music video for the song premiered on the music video website Vevo. "Say Goodbye" has sold 7,000 downloads in the United States.
- "Lifetime": The song was released on November 10, 2009, on McPhee's Myspace page and for purchase on iTunes and was not released to radio. "Lifetime" has sold 5,000 downloads in the United States.
- "How": The song was released on December 21, 2009, on McPhee's Myspace page and for purchase on iTunes and was not released to radio. "How" has sold 9,000 downloads in the United States.
- "Terrified" became known nationally when the song was used by finalist Didi Benami during the Hollywood round of the ninth season of American Idol on February 10, 2010, to much praise. As a result of Benami's performance, downloads of McPhee's track increased by nearly 10,000 percent, from a couple hundred the week before to nearly 20,000. On May 4, 2010, a new version of the song featuring actor Zachary Levi premiered on Entertainment Weekly's website and was made available for purchase on iTunes. On May 7, 2010, an accompanying music video for the new version premiered on the music video website Vevo. The album version of the song (featuring Jason Reeves) has sold 41,000 downloads in the United States.

== Appearance in media ==
- "Lifetime" was used in an episode of the CBS series Ghost Whisperer, in the Season 5 episode "Dead Eye" that was broadcast April 9, 2010.
- "Lifetime" was used in the CW drama Hellcats, in the episode The Match Game that was broadcast October 27, 2010.
- "Say Goodbye" was featured on the CBS drama CSI: NY, in the episode Prey that was broadcast April 8, 2009. McPhee guest-starred as a singer and stalker victim turned murderer and sang a partial version of the song during the episode.
- "Say Goodbye" was used in the Christian-themed indie movie "I Am - The Movie", which premiered in 2010.

== Track listing ==
No.	Title	Writer(s)	Producer(s)	Length
1.	"It's Not Right"	Lucie Silvas, Gary Go	John Alagia	3:54
2.	"Had It All"	Kara DioGuardi, Mitch Allan, David Hodges	Alagia	3:06
3.	"Keep Drivin"	Katharine McPhee, Chris Tompkins, Rachael Yamagata	Alagia	3:57
4.	"Last Letter"	McPhee, Barry Dean, Luke Laird	McPhee, Martin, Bishop, Daniel Lloyd	3:20
5.	"Surrender"	McPhee, Ingrid Michaelson, Marshall Altman	Alagia	3:42
6.	"Terrified" (featuring Jason Reeves)	DioGuardi, Jason Reeves	Alagia	3:56
7.	"How"	Silvas, busbee, Alex James	Alagia	3:32
8.	"Say Goodbye"	Troy Verges, Aimee Mayo, Chris Lindsey, Hillary Lindsey	Alagia	3:46
9.	"Faultline"	Silvas, Shridhar Solanki, Rachel Thibodeau	Alagia	4:14
10.	"Anybody's Heart"	McPhee, Dean, Laird	Alagia	3:21
11.	"Lifetime"	McPhee, Boots Ottestad	Ottestad	3:11
12.	"Unbroken"	McPhee, Paula Cole	Alagia	4:17
13.	"Brand New Key"	Melanie Safka	Alagia	2:59
Total length:				48:17

iTunes bonus tracks
No.	Title	Writer(s)	Length
14.	"Takes a Lot of Love"	Richard Harris	4:15
15.	"Help Me"	Joni Mitchell	3:28
16.	"I'll Be Home for Christmas"	Kim Gannon, Walter Kent	3:18
17.	"Had It All music video"

Deluxe edition DVD
No.	Title	Length
1.	"Had It All music video"
2.	"Making of album"
3.	"Making of HIA Music Video"
4.	"Behind the scenes of album photoshoot"
5.	"Photo Gallery/Montage"
6.	"Track by Track commentary by McPhee"

== Personnel ==
- Katherine McPhee – vocals
- Zac Rae – keyboards (1–3, 6, 7, 9, 10, 13), acoustic piano (2–5, 7, 8), Hammond B3 organ (2, 5, 6), synthesizers (7)
- Patrice Rushen – acoustic piano (4)
- Billy Childs – acoustic piano (5, 12)
- Boots Ottestad – keyboards (11), acoustic guitar (11), electric guitar (11), bass (11), drums (11), percussion (11), music box (11)
- Mark Goldenberg – electric guitar (1, 2)
- Michael Chaves – guitars (1–7, 9, 10, 13), backing vocals (9)
- John Alagia – acoustic guitar (2), backing vocals (2, 6, 9), acoustic piano (3)
- Paul Jackson Jr. – acoustic guitar (4), electric guitar (4)
- Sean Hurley – bass (1–3, 5–7, 9, 13)
- Rhonda Smith – bass (4)
- Victor Indrizzo – drums (1–3, 5–10, 13), percussion (1–3, 6, 7), programming (1, 3, 7)
- Anthony Moore – drums (1)
- Oliver Kraus – cello (1, 8, 10, 12), violin (1, 8, 10, 12), string arrangements (1, 8, 10, 12)
- Lucie Silvas – backing vocals (1–3, 7, 9)
- Jason Reeves – backing vocals (3), vocals (6)
- Rachel Yamagata – backing vocals (3)

Production and Technical

- Suite 3 Music – executive producer
- Brian Scheuble – recording (1–3, 5–10, 12, 13)
- Jeff Lorber – recording (4)
- Chris Thompson – recording (4)
- Boots Ottestad – recording (11)
- Lars Fox – Pro Tools engineer (11)
- Mark Endert – mixing (1–3, 6, 7, 9, 11)
- Jon Gass – mixing (4, 5, 8, 10, 12, 13)
- Nolan Sipe – assistant engineer (1–3, 5–10, 12, 13)
- Michael John Feig – assistant engineer (4)
- Eddy Schreyer – mastering at Oasis Mastering (Burbank, California)
- Mitchell Cohen – A&R direction
- Evelyn Morgan – A&R administration
- Lisa Hansen – release coordinator
- Andy Kman – release coordinator
- John Newcott – release coordinator
- Hollis King – art direction
- Sachico Asano – graphic design
- Ellen von Unwerth – photography
- Joanne Gair – make-up
- Victoria Adcock – stylist

== Critical reception ==
Professional ratings
Aggregate scores
Source	Rating
Metacritic	58/100
Review scores
Source	Rating
Allmusic	2.5/5 stars
Billboard Magazine	(favorable)
The Boston Globe	(favorable)
Entertainment Weekly	C+
People	2.5/4 stars
Times Union	(favorable)
Philadelphia Inquirer	2.5/4 stars
Tampa Bay Times	C

Unbroken received generally mixed reviews. At Metacritic, which assigns a normalized rating out of 100 to reviews from mainstream critics, the album has received a score of 58, indicating "mixed or average reviews".

- Allmusic stated: "On Idol, McPhee always favored middle of the road over modern, and Unbroken returns her to that course, bringing her somewhere within the vicinity of Paula Cole (who co-writes the title track), Rachael Yamagata (who co-writes “Keep Drivin’”) and Mandy Moore's stylized ‘70s throwback, flavored with the slightest traces of modern sounds, including a vague borrowing of Beyoncé phrasing."
- Billboard stated: "McPhee sounds much more comfortable amid Alagia's rootsy singer/songwriter settings than she did surrounded by the shiny R&B beats of her self-titled debut."
- Boston Globe said: "Unbroken is a conventional set, at times too much so, with a stripped-down musical backdrop of acoustic guitars and piano. McPhee has smartly reined in her vocal approach to find the nuances of the lyrics without trying to raise the roof."
- Entertainment Weekly said: "The Idolrunner-up's pleasant-but-unremarkable vocals can't elevate this tepid collection."

== Charts ==
Chart performance for Unbroken
Chart (2010)	Peak position
US Billboard 200	27
