= Alex Budman =

American musician

Alexander Budman (born February 15, 1973) is a multi-instrumentalist, composer and arranger from Sacramento, California, United States. Alex lived in the San Francisco Bay Area from 1995-2005 and was best known there for leading the Contemporary Jazz Orchestra. He has lived in Los Angeles since 2005, playing mostly jazz and popular music. He plays the saxophone, clarinet, flute, keyboard and bass.

== Albums as a leader ==
- From There to Here - Budman/Levy Orchestra
- Instruments of Mass Pleasure - Contemporary Jazz Orchestra
- Monday in the City - Contemporary Jazz Orchestra

== Discography ==
Alex has recorded on hundreds of albums, television shows, and movies. Album credits include these artists:

D'Angelo, Seal, Robbie Williams, Elvis Costello and the Roots, Leslie Odom Jr, Clare Fischer, Rafael Saadiq, The Game, Pink Martini, John Beasley's MONKestra, Glee, Joy Oladokun, Creed Bratton, Spencer Day, Sam Phillips, Mavis Staples, Susan Tedeschi, Suzie McNeil, Leftover Cuties, Busta Rhymes, Richard Cheese, The Velvet Teen.
