= Collage (Karrin Allyson album) =

Studio album by Karrin Allyson
- Released: June 30, 1996
- Recorded: January 5–6 and 8–10, 1996
- Studio: Soundtrek Studios, Kansas City, Missouri.
- Genre: Jazz
- Length: 57:18
- Label: Concord Jazz CCD-4709

Karrin Allyson chronology
Azure-Té (1995)	Collage (1996)	Daydream (1997)

Professional ratings
Review scores
Source	Rating
AllMusic	4.5/5 stars
The Encyclopedia of Popular Music	3/5 stars
Tom Hull	B+
The Penguin Guide to Jazz on CD	3/5 stars

Collage is the fourth studio album by the American jazz singer Karrin Allyson. The album was recorded in the Soundtrek Studios of Kansas City, Missouri, and was released on June 30, 1996, by the Concord Jazz label.

== Reception ==
Owen Curdle of JazzTimes mentioned: "Allyson, who lives in Kansas City, is a hard-working singer who is good at a lot of things. On 'It Could Happen To You'/'Fried Bananas,' she is cool and seductive. Later, she sings 'Autumn Leaves' in French and 'Faltando Um Pedaco' in Portuguese. On Jay Leonhart's 'Robert Frost' and Billy Joel's 'And So It Goes,' there's a bit of the Elizabethan folk-singer in her presentation. Her versions of Clifford Brown's 'Joy Spring' and Ray Noble's 'Cherokee' are fine bebop displays. She also demonstrates a flair for the blues, on Bonnie Raitt's 'Give It Up Or Let Me Go.' Then there's Monk's 'Ask Me Now.' The album includes an almost all-K.C. cast." AllMusic's Scott Yanow wrote: "Vocalist Karrin Allyson stretches herself during this diverse set... With assistance from her fine Kansas City-based rhythm section...and with some worthy guests...Karrin Allyson shows just how versatile and talented a singer she is. Recommended."

== Track listing ==
No.	Title	Writer(s)	Length
1.	"It Could Happen to You / Fried Bananas"	Johnny Burke, Dexter Gordon, James Van Heusen	4:42
2.	"Autumn Leaves (Les Feuilles Mortes)"	Joseph Kosma	4:43
3.	"Robert Frost"	Jay Leonhart	5:02
4.	"All of You"	Cole Porter	4:40
5.	"And So It Goes"	Billy Joel	3:40
6.	"Joy Spring"	Clifford Brown	4:14
7.	"Ask Me Now"	Thelonious Monk	6:38
8.	"Cherokee"	Ray Noble	3:45
9.	"Here, There and Everywhere"	John Lennon, Paul McCartney	4:47
10.	"Give It Up or Let Me Go"	Bonnie Raitt	4:06
11.	"Faltando Um Pedaço (Missing a Piece)"	Djavan Viana	6:07
12.	"Live for Life"	Francis Lai	4:54
Total length:			57:18
