= Edgar Sampson =

American jazz composer, arranger, and musician

- Born: Edgar Melvin Sampson; October 31, 1907; New York City, New York, United States
- Died: January 16, 1973 (aged 65) Englewood, New Jersey, United States
- Occupations: Composer, arranger, instrumentalist
- Instruments: Saxophone, violin
- Years active: 1924–1960s

Edgar Melvin Sampson (October 31, 1907 – January 16, 1973), nicknamed "The Lamb", was an American jazz composer, arranger, saxophonist, and violinist. Born in New York City, he began playing violin aged six and picked up the saxophone in high school. He worked as an arranger and composer for many jazz bands in the 1930s and 1940s. He composed several well-known jazz standards, including "Stompin' at the Savoy", and "Don't Be That Way".

== Life and career ==
Born in New York City, Sampson began his professional career in 1924 with a violin piano duo with Joe Colman. Through the rest of the 1920s and early 1930s, Sampson played with many bands, including those of Charlie "Fess" Johnson, Duke Ellington, Rex Stewart and Fletcher Henderson.

In 1934, Sampson joined the Chick Webb band. It during his period with Webb that Sampson created his most enduring work as a composer, writing "Stompin' at the Savoy" and "Don't Be That Way". He left the Webb band in 1936 with a reputation as a composer and arranger that led to freelance work with Benny Goodman, Artie Shaw, Red Norvo, Teddy Hill, Teddy Wilson and Chick Webb.

Edgar Sampson became a student of the Schillinger System in the early 1940s. He continued to play sax through the late 1940s and started his own band (1949–51). In the late 1940s through the 1950s, he worked with Latin performers such as Marcelino Guerra, Tito Rodríguez and Tito Puente as an arranger. Sampson recorded one album under his own name, Swing Softly Sweet Sampson, in 1956. Due to illness, he stopped working in the late 1960s.

His daughter, Grace Sampson, studied music and co-wrote the standard "Mambo Inn" with Mario Bauzá and Bobby Woodlen.

== Compositions and arrangements ==
- "Dark Rapture" (Edgar Sampson, Benny Goodman, Manny Kurtz)
- "If Dreams Come True" (Edgar Sampson, Benny Goodman, Irving Mills)
- "Lullaby in Rhythm" (Edgar Sampson, Benny Goodman, Clarence Profit, Walter Hirsch)
- "Stompin' at the Savoy" (Edgar Sampson, Benny Goodman, Chick Webb, Andy Razaf)
- "Hoopdee Whodee (Edgar Sampson)
- "I'll Be Back for More" (Edgar Sampson, Candido Camero, Sammy Gallop)
- "Happy and Satisfied" (Edgar Sampson, Walter Bishop)
- "Cool and Groovy" (Edgar Sampson)
- "Blue Lou" (Edgar Sampson, Irving Mills)
- "The Blues Made Me Feel This Way" (Edgar Sampson)
- "Light and Sweet" (Edgar Sampson, Bill Hardy)
- "The Sweetness of You" (Edgar Sampson)
- "Don't Be That Way" (Edgar Sampson, Benny Goodman, Mitchell Parish)

(Source: Liner notes from Swing Softly Sweet Sampson, Coral Record CRL 57049 (1957)
