= Katharine McPhee =

American singer and actress (born 1984)

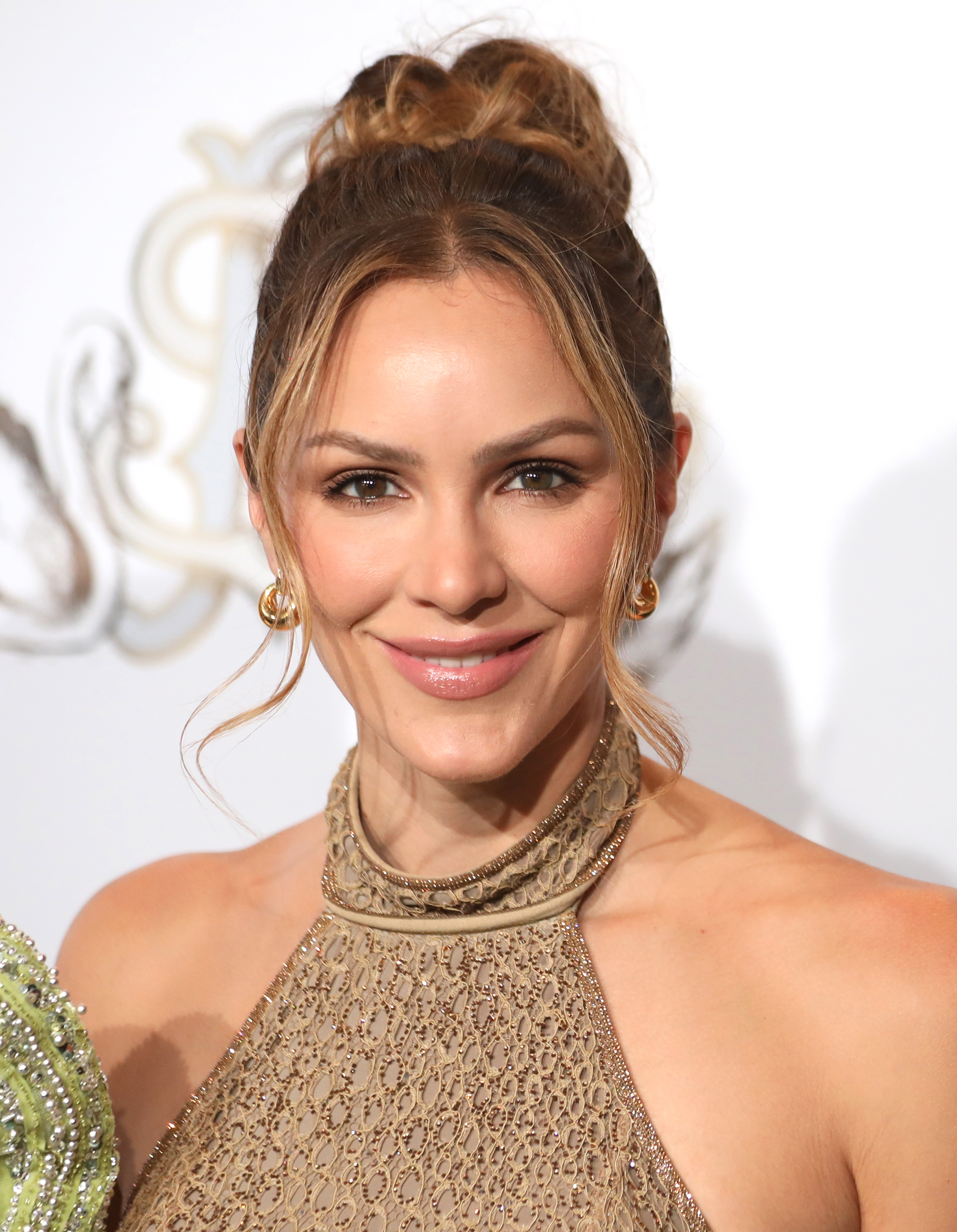
- McPhee at Celebrity Fight Night in Tucson, Arizona, April 2024
- Born: Katharine Hope McPhee; March 25, 1984 (age 42); Los Angeles, California, U.S.
- Other name: Katharine Foster
- Education: Boston Conservatory (attended)
- Occupations: Actress; singer
- Years active: 2005–present
- Spouses: Nick Cokas (m. 2008; div. 2016); David Foster (m. 2019)
- Children: 1
- Musical career
- Genres: Country; Pop; R&B
- Labels: Melody Place; 19; RCA; Verve Forecast; Columbia; BMG
- Website: katharinemcphee.net

Katharine Hope McPhee (born March 25, 1984) is an American actress and singer. In May 2006, she was the runner-up on the fifth season of American Idol.

Her eponymous debut album was released on RCA Records in January 2007, and debuted at number two on the Billboard 200, selling 381,000 copies (as of December 2010). The album's first single, "Over It", was a Billboard Top 30 hit and was certified gold in 2008. Her second album, Unbroken, was released on Verve Forecast Records on January 5, 2010, and debuted at No. 27 on the Billboard 200. The album featured the single "Had It All", which peaked at number 22 on the AC chart. It has sold 45,000 copies as of January 2011.

Her third album, the holiday-themed Christmas Is the Time to Say I Love You, was released in October 2010. It debuted at number 11 on the Billboard Top Holiday Albums chart, while the single "Have Yourself a Merry Little Christmas" peaked at number 16 on the Billboard AC chart. McPhee released her fourth album, Hysteria, in September 2015. She released her fifth album, I Fall in Love Too Easily, composed of jazz standards, in November 2017.

McPhee has an established acting career, in The House Bunny and Shark Night 3D, and portrayed Karen Cartwright in Smash (2012–2013) and Paige Dineen in Scorpion (2014–2018). She made her Broadway debut as Jenna in Waitress in 2018 and originated the role in the West End production (2019), and returned to the Broadway show (2019–2020).

== Early life ==
McPhee was born in Los Angeles. Her father, Daniel McPhee, was a television producer. Her mother, Peisha (née Burch) McPhee, has been a vocal coach on American Idol since 2011. The family moved to the Sherman Oaks neighborhood of Los Angeles when she was 12 years old. Peisha McPhee recognized her daughter's musical talent and decided to train her. McPhee's older sister, Adriana, has been a vocal coach on American Idol since 2012. McPhee is of English, Irish, Scottish, and German descent.

She attended Boston Conservatory for three semesters, majoring in musical theatre. She left college before graduation on the advice of her manager, and returned to Los Angeles to try out for television pilots. McPhee was cast (during the time she had dropped out of college and was auditioning in Los Angeles) in a mall-based MTV soap opera pilot, You Are Here, playing the older sister of a more popular younger sister. MTV never aired the pilot and did not pick up the series.

In March 2005, McPhee starred as Annie Oakley in a Cabrillo Music Theater production of the musical Annie Get Your Gun. McPhee was nominated for a Los Angeles Stage Ovation Award in the category of "Lead Actress in a Musical". McPhee had a small role as Paramount Girl in the 2007 musical film Crazy, based on the life of Hank Garland. McPhee filmed the role in early 2005, before she auditioned for American Idol. She has struggled with eating disorders. She told People that at age 13, she began starving herself and exercising compulsively, and at age 17, became bulimic. McPhee gained weight in college due to her bingeing. After seven years of illness, she finally entered a three-month rehabilitation program after successfully passing her American Idol audition; her rehab stint ended just before the Idol semifinals started in February 2006.

She told Teen Vogue in May 2007, "I eat whatever I crave—I'm just really careful about portions." McPhee and her sister appeared on the debut of The Dr. Keith Ablow Show on September 18, 2006, to discuss her struggles with bulimia and her childhood fear of her father.

== Career ==
=== American Idol ===
In 2005, McPhee was persuaded by Nick Cokas and her parents to try out for American Idol. She auditioned in San Francisco and sang "God Bless the Child", originally performed by Billie Holiday, and was selected to be a participant in the fifth season, which aired in 2006. After the first round of Hollywood week, she sang "I'll Never Love This Way Again" by Dionne Warwick, which earned favorable comments from the judges. During the second round, she performed in a group, singing "I Can't Help Myself (Sugar Pie Honey Bunch)" by the Four Tops, forgetting the words, but the judges decided to advance the entire group. During the third round, she sang "My Funny Valentine" a cappella and advanced to the top 40. McPhee's run on American Idol led to the use of the term "McPheever". Mayor Antonio Villaraigosa visited the school and proclaimed the day Katharine McPhee Day. She finished as the runner-up to Taylor Hicks.

=== Performances and results (during voting weeks) ===
Week #	Theme	Song choice	Original artist	Result
Top 24 (12 Women)	Free Choice	"Since I Fell for You"	Ella Johnson	Safe
Top 20 (10 Women)	Free Choice	"All in Love is Fair"	Stevie Wonder	Safe
Top 16 (8 Women)	Free Choice	"Think"	Aretha Franklin	Safe
Top 12	Stevie Wonder	"Until You Come Back to Me (That's What I'm Gonna Do)"	Stevie Wonder	Safe
Top 11	The 1950s	"Come Rain or Come Shine"	Sy Oliver (with the Tommy Dorsey Orchestra)	Safe
Top 10	Songs from The 21st Century	"The Voice Within"	Christina Aguilera	Bottom 2
Top 9	Country	"Bringing Out the Elvis"	Faith Hill	Safe
Top 8	Songs by Queen	"Who Wants to Live Forever"	Queen	Safe
Top 7	The Great American Songbook	"Someone to Watch Over Me"	Gertrude Lawrence	Safe
Top 6	Great Love Songs	"I Have Nothing"	Whitney Houston	Safe^{1}
Top 5	One Song From the Year They Were Born (1984); One Song on the Billboard Charts at the time	"Against All Odds (Take a Look at Me Now)" "Black Horse and the Cherry Tree"	Phil Collins; KT Tunstall	Safe
Top 4	Elvis Presley	"Hound Dog"/"All Shook Up" "Can't Help Falling in Love"	Big Mama Thornton / Elvis Presley	Bottom 2^{2}
Top 3	Clive Davis's choice Judge's Choice (Simon Cowell); Contestant's Choice	"I Believe I Can Fly" "Somewhere Over the Rainbow" "I Ain't Got Nothin' But the Blues"	R. Kelly; Judy Garland; Duke Ellington	Safe
Finale	Contestant's Choice; Contestant's Choice; Coronation Song	"Black Horse and the Cherry Tree" "Somewhere Over the Rainbow" "My Destiny"	KT Tunstall; Judy Garland; Katharine McPhee	Runner-Up

- ^Note 1 When Ryan Seacrest announced the results that night, McPhee was placed in the top two.
- ^Note 2 When Ryan Seacrest announced the results that night, McPhee was in the bottom two but declared safe when Chris Daughtry was eliminated.

=== 2006–08: Katharine McPhee and feature-film debut ===
In June 2006, McPhee signed to American Idol series creator Simon Fuller's 19 Recordings Limited and Sony BMG's RCA Records. In the same month, she performed at the JCPenney Jam: Concert for America's Kids, soloing with "Somewhere Over the Rainbow" and performing a duet with Andrea Bocelli on "Somos Novios".

McPhee's Idol single, "Somewhere Over the Rainbow/My Destiny" was released on June 27, 2006, by RCA Records. "Somewhere Over the Rainbow" peaked at number 12 on the Billboard Hot 100 and "My Destiny" peaked at number 60. Thirty-two weeks after its release, Somewhere Over the Rainbow/My Destiny had climbed to number four on the Billboard Hot Singles Sales charts. It was the second-highest best-selling single of 2006 after Taylor Hicks' "Do I Make You Proud". "Somewhere Over the Rainbow/My Destiny" remained on the chart for more than 58 weeks.

In July, McPhee missed the first three weeks of the American Idol Tour due to laryngitis and bronchitis. She joined the tour beginning with the July 28 show in Washington, D.C., singing only two songs "Over the Rainbow" and "Black Horse and the Cherry Tree", instead of the usual four, on doctor's orders to conserve her voice. At the August 1 concert in Charlotte, North Carolina, she suffered a hairline fracture of her foot when she tripped backstage and was fitted with a walking-boot cast. Once she recovered from the foot injury, she added "Think" to her concert set.

McPhee recorded a duet with Andrea Bocelli on "Can't Help Falling in Love" for his Under the Desert Sky album, which was released as a CD/DVD package on November 7, 2006. McPhee signed a two-year endorsement deal in 2006 with Sexy Hair Concepts to become their first celebrity spokesperson for their hair-care product line. Also in 2006, she founded a charity called McPhee Outreach. The purpose of the charity is to team up with other foundations or organizations and help in any way possible. The foundation teamed up with the Lollipop Theater Network to provide music outreach (called "Rhythm of Hope") to sick children in Southern California hospitals. McPhee Outreach teamed up with Global Compassion Services to build a preschool in the West African nation of Burkina Faso to help combat that nation's high illiteracy rate.

On December 1, 2006, McPhee released "A Gift to You / O Come All Ye Faithful". The single was conceived and co-produced by Al Gomes of Big Noise, along with Walter Afanasieff. McPhee performed "O Come All Ye Faithful" on the TNT Network special Christmas in Washington, DC. Her self-titled debut album, Katharine McPhee was released on January 30, 2007, and sold 116,000 copies its first week, debuting at number two on the Billboard 200 Albums Chart. The first single from the album was "Over It" peaked at number 29 on the Billboard Hot 100. The second single, "Love Story" failed to crack the Billboard Hot 100.

In early 2007, McPhee guest-starred in the web series, lonelygirl15 as an unnamed character in the episode "Truth or Dare". She made a cameo appearance as herself on Ugly Betty in the episode "I'm Coming Out". The episode was broadcast February 1, 2007. During the 2007 Christmas holiday season, she re-released her Christmas single "O Come All Ye Faithful". On January 11, 2008, Billboard.com reported that McPhee had been released from her contract with RCA Records.

McPhee signed a two-year endorsement deal with Neutrogena to become the new spokesperson for their anti-acne skin-care product line. She appeared on American Idol judge Randy Jackson's album Randy Jackson's Music Club, Vol. 1, which was released on March 11, 2008. She recorded a duet of "Real Love" with fellow American Idol 5 contestant Elliott Yamin. On March 12, 2008, McPhee returned to the American Idol stage during the Top 12 results night of the seventh season of the competition. She performed The Beatles song "Something", with producer David Foster, on piano. She took part in the David Foster tribute concert Hit Man: David Foster & Friends, which was filmed by PBS, in May 2008. She soloed on "Somewhere" and performed a duet of "The Prayer" with Bocelli. A CD/DVD was released in November 2008. Foster recorded "I Will Be There With You" for Japan Airlines (JAL), with McPhee on vocals. Beginning in June 2008, it was used to promote the introduction of new aircraft to JAL's US flights.

In August 2008, McPhee made her debut in The House Bunny as a member of a misfit sorority. McPhee released a cover of the song "I Know What Boys Like", featuring other cast members. In September 2008, she took part in Chris Botti's concert. She sang "I've Got You Under My Skin" accompanied by Botti on trumpet. The concert was aired on PBS in January 2009 and the live album, Chris Botti in Boston, was released March 31, 2009.

=== 2009–10: Unbroken, TV shows, and movie projects ===
On January 27, 2009, McPhee signed a record deal with Verve Forecast Records (part of the Verve Music Group under Universal Music Group).

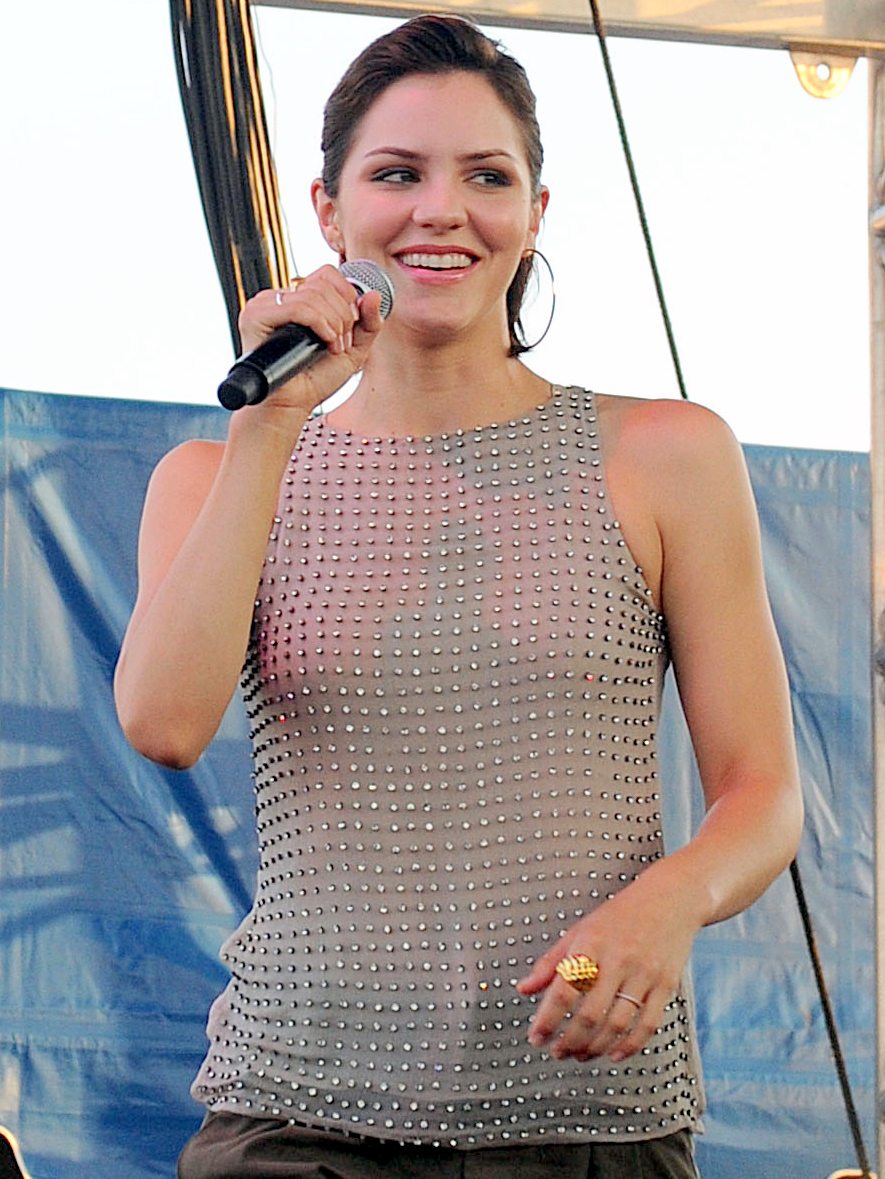
McPhee performing for the United States Army at Fort Knox, Kentucky, May 2010

McPhee guest-starred on CSI: NY in the episode "Prey" as a singer and stalker victim who murdered her stalker. The episode was broadcast April 8, 2009. In September 2009, McPhee took part in the United Negro College Fund's "An Evening of Stars" concert that was a tribute to singer-songwriter Lionel Richie. McPhee sang You Are. The concert was broadcast in syndication and on BET the weekend of January 23–24, 2010. A two-disc DVD of the concert was available for a time through a donation to the United Negro College Fund. McPhee joined actresses Alyson Hannigan, Jaime King, Minka Kelly, and Emily Deschanel in a video slumber party made available in October 2009 and featured on FunnyorDie.com and other Internet platforms in a comedic take to promote regular breast-cancer screenings for the organization Stand Up to Cancer. A Christmas single "I'll Be Home for Christmas" was released November 17, 2009.

McPhee's second album Unbroken was released January 5, 2010, and debuted at number 27 on the Billboard 200 chart, selling 15,000 copies its first week. For her second effort, she worked with producer John Alagía. The first single from the album, "Had It All", was released to McPhee's MySpace page on August 25, 2009.

McPhee appeared on the January 19, 2010, episode of The Biggest Loser. On February 1, 2010, McPhee joined over 75 other musicians, including fellow American Idol alumni Jennifer Hudson and Jordin Sparks and American Idol judge Randy Jackson, for a remake of "We Are the World", retitled "We Are the World 25 for Haiti", which marked the 25th anniversary of the iconic song and for which proceeds will go to Haitian earthquake relief.

During the week of February 8, 2010, in the taped Hollywood Week portion of the ninth season of American Idol, contestant Didi Benami was shown singing "Terrified", a song on the Unbroken album and written by Idol judge Kara DioGuardi. As a result of the exposure, digital downloads of the song (the album version featuring Jason Reeves) rose nearly 10 times from the week before, selling about 20,000 copies for the week, for a total of 22,000 sold at that point.

On February 22, 2010, McPhee appeared in the production of 110 Stories, directed by Mark Freiburger at the Geffen Playhouse in Los Angeles. She co-starred alongside Ed Asner, Diane Venora, Gail O'Grady, John Hawkes, Malcolm-Jamal Warner, and many others. The play was a benefit to help the victims of the recent Haiti earthquake. Proceeds went to the Red Cross of Greater Los Angeles. On March 9, 2010, McPhee performed "Surrender" at the White House, in front of President Obama and the First Lady as part of International Women's Day. McPhee guest-starred on Community in the episode "Basic Genealogy" as Chevy Chase's character's ex-stepdaughter and potential love interest for Joel McHale's character. The episode was broadcast March 11, 2010.

In April 2010, McPhee made a TV pilot for The Pink House playing Emily, a down-to-earth Midwestern girl new to Manhattan Beach, California. The pilot was shot as a possible pickup for the Fall 2010 season and was produced by Conan O'Brien's production company, with O'Brien as executive producer. NBC did not pick up the pilot.

On May 4, 2010, a new version of the Unbroken song "Terrified" featuring actor Zachary Levi premiered on Entertainment Weekly's website and was made available for purchase on iTunes. The accompanying music video premiered on May 7, 2010, on the music video website Vevo. In the summer of 2010, McPhee partnered with Feeding America and ConAgra Foods Foundation to help launch the Hunger-Free Summer Initiative, which aimed to help children at risk of hunger during the summer months.

McPhee released a Christmas album titled Christmas Is the Time to Say I Love You on October 12, 2010. The album debuted at number 11 on the Billboard Top Holiday Albums chart and sold 1,000 copies in its first week. One of the Christmas album's songs "Have Yourself a Merry Little Christmas" was released to radio in November 2010 and peaked at number 16 on the Billboard Adult Contemporary Chart. Country singer Chelsea Field's song "Love's Never Leavin'", a song that McPhee co-wrote with singer-songwriter Richard Marx and producer Trey Bruce, was made available for purchase on iTunes on November 9, 2010, with 100% of the proceeds to benefit the Tammany Humane Society in Covington, LA.

=== 2011–2013: Smash series and new record deal ===
In February 2011, McPhee landed a starring role in the TV pilot Smash, also starring Debra Messing, Megan Hilty, Jack Davenport, Anjelica Huston, Christian Borle, and Brian d'Arcy James. In May 2011, NBC picked up Smash as a series. The series, set as a musical drama, follows a group of characters who come together to put on a Broadway musical inspired by Marilyn Monroe. On June 9, 2011, McPhee signed a record deal with Columbia Records, in conjunction with Columbia teaming with NBC to distribute the music for Smash. In July 2011, Forbes reported that she was number 10 on their list of the 10 top-earning American Idol performers (she was tied with David Archuleta and David Cook), earning $1 million (pretax estimates before subtracting manager and agent fees) for music and acting endeavors for the period May 2010 to May 2011.

McPhee co-starred in Shark Night 3D, which was released September 2, 2011. In December 2011, she became a spokesperson for the Malaria No More organization to help raise awareness about the campaign to eradicate malaria. NBC debuted Smash in midseason 2011–12 on February 6, 2012, to generally favorable reviews, scoring a 79 out of 100 on Metacritic. On March 26, 2012, Smash was renewed for a second season. she recorded a voice-over for Family Guy, for the episode "You Can't Do That on Television, Peter", playing the voice of Mother Maggie. The episode was broadcast April 1, 2012.

McPhee had a cameo role as a singer performing at a festival in Peace, Love & Misunderstanding. The film was out as a limited release on June 8, 2012. In early 2009, McPhee was cast in a lead role in the independent $6 million romantic-comedy You May Not Kiss the Bride, which was almost entirely filmed in Hawaii. She played the role of Masha alongside Dave Annable. The film debuted at the 14th Annual Sonoma International Film Festival that was held April 6–10, 2011 The film was released theatrically in the U.S. in late 2012, premiering August 29, 2012 in Hawaii and September 21, 2012 in several mainland markets including Chicago, Dallas, and Los Angeles. It was also released on Video On Demand, iTunes, and Amazon. One of the songs included in the movie was co-written by McPhee.

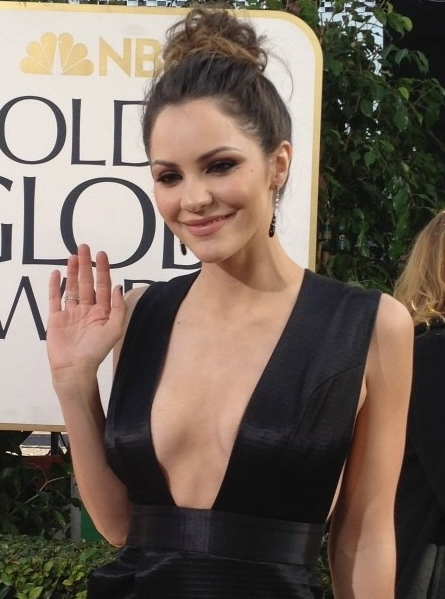
McPhee at the 2013 Golden Globe Awards

In January 2013, Forbes reported that McPhee again made their list of the 10 top-earning American Idol performers (she was tied with Kellie Pickler at number seven), earning $1.1 million (pretax estimates before subtracting manager and agent fees) for music and acting endeavors for the period May 2011 to May 2012.

On March 28, 2013, McPhee returned to the American Idol stage to perform on the 12th season top-eight results show with OneRepublic, where she lent guest vocals to the group's latest single, "If I Lose Myself". By April 2013, McPhee had begun recording her fourth studio album, then scheduled for release in late 2013 and featuring songwriting collaborations with Ryan Tedder, Linda Perry, and Sia. Smash was canceled in the same year, after two seasons. In August 2013, McPhee indicated in an interview for an upcoming concert that she hoped to see the album released in 2014.

=== 2014–2017: Scorpion and Hysteria ===
In January 2014, Forbes reported that McPhee continued to make their list of the 10 top-earners (tied with Jennifer Hudson at number 10), this time for 2013, earning $1 million (pretax estimates before subtracting manager and agent fees) for music and acting endeavors for the period May 2012 to May 2013. In November and December 2013, McPhee filmed a Hallmark Hall of Fame movie in Vancouver, called In My Dreams. Directed by Kenny Leon, it stars McPhee and Mike Vogel as two people searching for love and meeting in their dreams. The movie was broadcast on April 20, 2014.

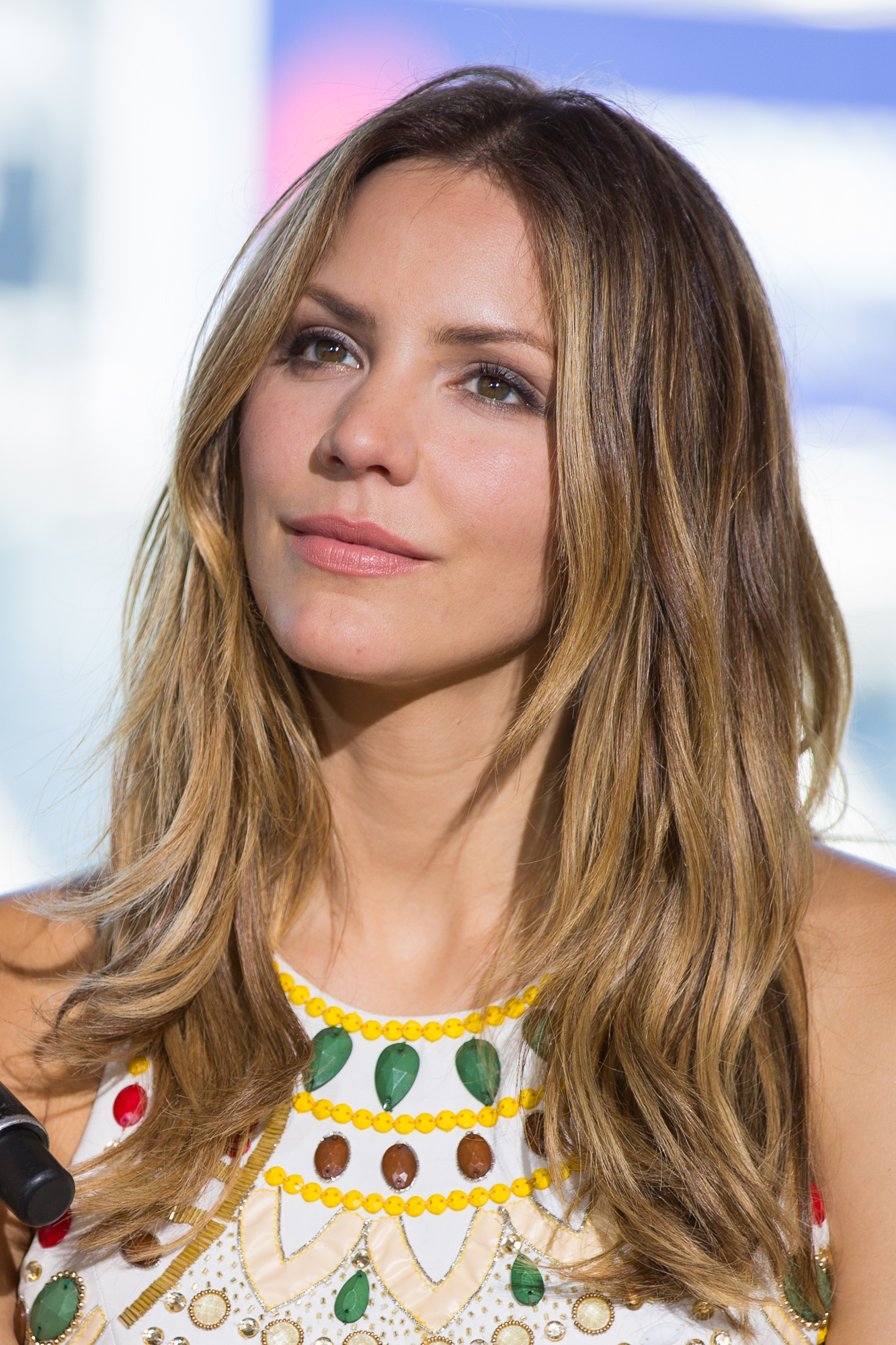
McPhee at the 2016 San Diego Comic-Con

McPhee starred as Paige Dineen in Scorpion. CBS picked up the show on May 9, 2014, and it premiered September 22. She guest-starred with fellow Smash actor Megan Hilty on the Wesley Taylor web series It Could Be Worse. McPhee and Hilty filmed the roles in January 2014 and the episode premiered with the second season on Hulu in July 2014.

McPhee said in interviews for Scorpion, including one with the Los Angeles Times in September 2014, that her fourth album had been put on hold due to Scorpion being picked up. CBS debuted Scorpion on September 22, 2014, as part of the 2014–15 fall TV season. The pilot received generally mixed reviews from critics. On Metacritic, it received a score of 48/100 from 19 critics, indicating mixed or average reviews. The pilot earned 13.83 million viewers and a 3.2 in the 18–49 demographic. McPhee covered the Frankie Valli song "Can't Take My Eyes Off You" in the episode "Risky Business".

On November 5, 2014, McPhee was a presenter for the 2015 People's Choice Awards nominations announcement. she performed on the 16th annual A Home For the Holidays adoption special that was broadcast on December 19, 2014. It was her second appearance on the annual special. On January 7, 2015, she was a presenter at the 2015 People's Choice Awards, where she introduced a performance by Lady Antebellum.

On January 18, McPhee sang the national anthem before the NFC Championship Game in Seattle. On January 26, she co-hosted with sports analyst Boomer Esiason the 2015 Greatest Super Bowl Commercials special. On February 8, McPhee was a presenter at the 2015 Grammy Awards on CBS, where she introduced a performance of Tony Bennett and Lady Gaga.

On April 9, 2015, McPhee posted a photo on Instagram, teasing about the upcoming music video of the first single from her fourth album. "Lick My Lips", written by Florence and the Machine member Isabella Summers, was released on May 26. The track list of Hysteria has been revealed with one song written by Ryan Tedder and another song written by Sia Furler. On August 14, "Stranger than Fiction", a song co-written by Ryan Tedder and McPhee, was released. On August 28, "Love Strikes" was released on iTunes. Hysteria, McPhee's fourth studio album was released as scheduled on September 18, 2015.

On December 6, she performed "You Make Me Feel So Young" and with John Legend on "You and Me (We Wanted It All)" on the Sinatra 100: An All-Star Grammy Concert. McPhee returned to American Idol on March 24, 2016, and performed "Somewhere Over the Rainbow". She returned for the fifteenth season finale on April 7, where she performed a short version of "Need You Now" with Casey James as part of an acoustic medley. McPhee appeared on Lip Sync Battle on April 7, 2016, where she performed against Jason Derulo and won. On September 18, 2015, she independently released her fourth album, Hysteria, composed of pop originals. In December 2016, she performed as the opening act at several stops on Andrea Bocelli's tour. On February 12, 2017, McPhee was a presenter with The Chainsmokers at the 59th Annual Grammy Awards.

On April 16, 2017, CBS broadcast the concert Stayin' Alive: A Grammy's Salute to the Music of the Bee Gees, where McPhee performed "Emotion". In June 2017, McPhee began filming the independent film Louisiana Cavier in New Orleans.

=== 2017–2021: I Fall in Love Too Easily and Waitress ===
On November 4, 2017, McPhee starred in the Lifetime TV movie The Lost Wife of Robert Durst in the role of Robert Durst's first wife Kathie.I Fall in Love Too Easily, a collection of romantic standards, was released on November 17, 2017, via BMG. The first single, "Night and Day", was made available for free via streaming. She took over the lead female role of Jenna in Waitress as her Broadway debut. She began performances on April 10, 2018, and played the role through August 19, 2018.

On May 11, 2018, the song "Living in the Moment" was released. Carole Bayer Sager shared in a Twitter post that it was written by her, Jay Landers, and Walter Afanasieff as the theme for the movie Book Club. McPhee played the lead role Jenna again in Waitress at the Adelphi Theatre in London's West End in March through June 2019. She returned to the Broadway production on November 25, 2019, and remained with the show until its final performance on January 5, 2020.

In 2021, she played the role of Bailey in Country Comfort. Also in 2021, she and her husband David Foster competed in the sixth season of The Masked Singer as "Banana Split" in which McPhee dressed up as the ice cream half who did all the singing and Foster dressed up as the banana half who did the instrument playing and conducting. They were eliminated in the Group B Finale.

=== 2022–present: Christmas Songs and jewelry line ===
McPhee and Foster recorded a Christmas EP, Christmas Songs, composed of seven songs. The first single, "Jingle Bell Rock", was released digitally on October 28, 2022. The EP was released on November 25, 2022. She released a jewelry line, KMF Jewelry, in early November 2022.

She made her debut at the Grand Ole Opry on October 12, 2024.

== Personal life ==
After dating for three years, on February 2, 2008, McPhee married Nick Cokas at Beverly Hills Presbyterian Church. In October 2013, she was photographed publicly kissing her married Smash director, Michael Morris. On May 22, 2014, McPhee filed for divorce from Cokas, after "having been separated for the past year". Her divorce from Cokas was finalized on February 8, 2016. McPhee dated her Scorpion co-star Elyes Gabel for almost two years. They split in 2016.

She and record producer David Foster were engaged in June 2018. They married a year later on June 28, 2019, at the St. Yeghiche Armenian Apostolic Church in Kensington, London. She gave birth to a son on February 22, 2021. In February 2022, McPhee said she was struggling with her mental health after gaining weight during her pregnancy.

== Discography ==
- Katharine McPhee (2007)
- Unbroken (2010)
- Christmas Is the Time to Say I Love You (2010)
- Hysteria (2015)
- I Fall in Love Too Easily (2017)
- Christmas Songs (with David Foster) (2023)

== Filmography ==
=== Film ===
Year	Title	Role	Notes
2007	Crazy	Paramount Girl	
2008	The House Bunny	Harmony	
2011	You May Not Kiss the Bride	Masha	
2011	Shark Night 3D	Beth	
2012	Peace, Love & Misunderstanding	Sara	
2017	The Lost Wife of Robert Durst	Kathie	
2018	Bayou Caviar	Shelly	
2021	The Tiger Rising	Caroline Horton	

=== Television ===
Year	Title	Role	Notes
2006	American Idol	Herself	Contestant: runner-up (lost to Taylor Hicks)
2007	lonelygirl15	New Friend	Episode: "Truth or Dare"
2007	Ugly Betty	Herself	Episode: "I'm Coming Out"
2009	CSI: NY	Odessa Shaw / Dana Melton	Episode: "Prey"
2010	Community	Amber	Episode: "Basic Genealogy"
2011	The Voice	Herself	Guest; episode: "Live Finale Results"
2012	Family Guy	Mother Maggie	Voice role; episode: "You Can't Do That on Television, Peter"
2012–2013	Smash	Karen Cartwright	Main role
2014	It Could Be Worse	Lucy	Episode: "Uncharted Territory"
2014	In My Dreams	Natalie Russo	Television film
2014–2018	Scorpion	Paige Dineen	Main role
2016	Lip Sync Battle	Herself	Episode "Katharine McPhee vs. Jason Derulo"
2017	A Deadly Secret...	Kathie Durst	Television film
2021	Country Comfort	Bailey Hart	Main role
2021	The Masked Singer	Herself/Ice Cream	Season 6 contestant: half of costume "Banana Split" with husband David Foster

== Stage ==
Year	Production	Role	Location	Notes
2005	Annie Get Your Gun	Annie Oakley	Cabrillo Music Theatre	
2018	Waitress	Jenna Hunterson	Brooks Atkinson Theatre	Broadway
2019	Waitress	Jenna Hunterson	Adelphi Theatre	West End
2019–2020	Waitress	Jenna Hunterson	Brooks Atkinson Theatre	Broadway

== Awards and nominations ==
Year	Association	Category	Work	Result
2005	Ovation Awards	Lead Actress in a Musical	Annie Get Your Gun (stage production)	Nominated
2006	Fox Reality Awards	Favorite Hottie		Won
2006	Teen Choice Awards	Choice Breakout Female Artist		Nominated
2006	VH1 Big in '06 Awards	Big "It" Girl		Won
2007	Teen Choice Awards	Choice Breakout Female Artist		Nominated
2007	Young Hollywood Awards	Exciting New Vocalist		Won
2012	Teen Choice Awards	Choice TV Breakout Star: Female	Smash	Nominated
2012	Women's Image Network Awards	Best Actress in a Drama Series	Smash	Won
2018	Broadway.com Audience Awards	Favorite Replacement (Female)	Waitress	Won
