= Christmas Is the Time to Say I Love You (album) =

2010 album by Katharine McPhee

Studio album by Katharine McPhee
- Released: October 12, 2010
- Recorded: July – September 2010 (Los Angeles, California)
- Genre: Pop
- Label: Verve Forecast
- Producer: Allen Sides, Steven Miller

Katharine McPhee chronology
Unbroken (2010)	Christmas Is the Time to Say I Love You (2010)	Hysteria (2015)

Singles from Christmas Is the Time to Say I Love You
- 1. "Have Yourself a Merry Little Christmas" Released: November 2010

Christmas Is the Time to Say I Love You is the third studio album, and the first holiday-themed album, from American Idol season five runner-up Katharine McPhee. The album was released on October 12, 2010. The album features mostly covers, and one original song, "It's Not Christmas Without You". The album debuted at number 11 on the Billboard Top Holiday Albums chart and sold 1,000 copies in its first week. As of January 2011, the album has sold 23,000 copies.

== Recording and inspiration ==
In July 2010 McPhee began recording the album in Los Angeles. The following quote from McPhee was posted on her website:

Christmas really is my favorite time of year. It takes a little imagination to be recording right now but I don’t need a ton of Christmas lights in the studio to inspire me. I know these songs so well. These are the songs I listened to growing up. Hopefully my versions will be unique but at the same time timeless; full and rich yet simple and intimate.

The title track was originally recorded by Billy Squier in 1981. It also contains many other traditional tracks, a medley of "O Little Town of Bethlehem" and "Away in a Manger" and "Who Would Imagine a King", which was recorded by Whitney Houston in 1996 for the soundtrack of "The Preacher's Wife. Trumpeter Chris Botti accompanies McPhee on "Have Yourself a Merry Little Christmas"

== Singles ==
"Have Yourself a Merry Little Christmas" was released to AC radio in November 2010. It debuted on the Billboard Adult Contemporary chart at number 23 for the chart dated December 11, 2010. It has so far peaked at number sixteen on the chart.

== Music videos ==
The music video for "It's Not Christmas Without You" (co-starring actor Joel David Moore as McPhee's love interest) premiered on the music video website Vevo on December 10, 2010.

== Track listing ==
1. "Have Yourself a Merry Little Christmas" (feat. Chris Botti) (Ralph Blane, Hugh Martin) - 4:32
2. "Jingle Bells" (James Lord Pierpont) - 2:54
3. "It's Not Christmas Without You" (Michelle Lewis, Katharine McPhee, Doug Petty) - 3:58
4. "O Holy Night" (Adolphe Adam) - 4:27
5. "Silver Bells" (Ray Evans, Jay Livingston) - 3:17
6. "Christmas is the Time to Say 'I Love You'" (Billy Squier) - 3:12
7. "Medley: O Little Town of Bethlehem/Away in a Manger" (Traditional) - 3:22
8. "What Are You Doing New Year's Eve" (Frank Loesser) - 3:27
9. "White Christmas" (Irving Berlin) - 3:03
10. "Who Would Imagine a King" (Pierpont) - 2:38

iTunes bonus tracks

- "It's Beginning to Look a Lot Like Christmas" (Meredith Willson) - 3:36

== Critical reception ==
Allmusic stated: "Arriving nine months after Katharine McPhee's 2010 bleached-blonde AAA makeover Unbroken, Christmas Is the Time to Say I Love You finds McPhee going back to her roots, returning to her brunette locks and reviving the show-stopping theatrics that made her a star on American Idol. Christmas Is the Time is an old-fashioned holiday record through and through, from the reliance on standards to the soft, roomy arrangements that allow plenty of space for McPhee to hit her high notes, all without drawing too much attention to herself. It's a setting well suited for McPhee's strengths, and song for song, this may be her strongest album: she does well by the standards, and the pop songs -- including "It's Not Christmas Without You" and the title track originally sung by Billy Squier—are good adult contemporary numbers. The album is simple and lean, not intent on making McPhee into a chart star, benefiting from a seasonal formula that allows her to simply sing like she did when she was on Idol."

== Charts ==
Chart performance for Christmas Is the Time to Say I Love You
Chart (2010)	Peak position
US Top Current Albums (Billboard)	198
US Top Holiday Albums (Billboard)	11
