= Over It (Katharine McPhee song) =

Single by Katharine McPhee

from the album Katharine McPhee
- Released: January 15, 2007
- Recorded: 2006
- Genre: Pop
- Length: 3:35
- Label: RCA
- Songwriters: Josh Alexander; Billy Steinberg; Ruth-Anne Cunningham
- Producers: Billy Steinberg; Josh Alexander

Katharine McPhee singles chronology
| "Somewhere Over the Rainbow/My Destiny" (2006) | "Over It" (2007) | "Love Story" (2007) |

"Over It" is a song recorded by American singer Katharine McPhee from her eponymous debut studio album Katharine McPhee (2007). It was released as the lead single from the record on January 15, 2007, through RCA. Billy Steinberg and Josh Alexander produced "Over It", and co-wrote it with Ruth-Anne Cunningham. It is a pop breakup song with lyrics about young love.

Response to the single was mixed; some critics identified "Over It" as an album highlight, while others felt it was "generic". Billie Eilish stated on her radio show that "Over It" is one of her favorite songs, saying that "[Over It has] been like one of my top songs for like years". A music video was released to promote the track. German pop girl group Queensberry recorded a cover of "Over It" for their debut studio album Volume I (2008).

== Background and recording ==
Katharine McPhee was the runner-up of the fifth season of American Idol, and received a record contract with 19 Recordings. After releasing "My Destiny" and a cover version of "Somewhere Over the Rainbow" in 2006, McPhee started to work on her first album; "Over It" was written and recorded a few weeks before the album release in 2007. McPhee said that she instantly connected with the song, explaining: "I know what it feels like to be over a guy." She felt that the track would be relatable for listeners, and said that the track's title was one of her most frequently used expressions.

Billy Steinberg and Josh Alexander produced "Over It", and co-wrote it with Ruth-Anne Cunningham. Steve Ferrera arranged the vocals with Ferrara, who also played an acoustic guitar and keyboard for the instrumentation and programmed the bass and drums. The vocals were edited by Chris Garcia, Dave Russell, and Alexander, and produced by Ferrera. Backing vocals were provided by Cunningham, Denaine Jones, and Sharon Youngblood. "Over It" was recorded by Russell, Alexander, and Ariel Chobaz, with additional work done by James Edmunds. Scott Roewe was the technician for the track.

== Composition and lyrics ==
"Over It" is a pop song that lasts three minutes and 35-seconds. McPhee said that it is the only "pure pop" track from the album. It is composed in the key of F minor using common time and a moderately slow tempo of 84 beats per minute. Instrumentation is provided by a guitar and a piano. During the track, McPhee's vocal range spans from the low note of Eb_{3} to the high note of Eb_{5}. McPhee described "Over It" as a breakup song and a "very sultry song about young love". The opening lyrics are: "I'm over your lies and I'm over your games."

== Release and remixes ==
"Over It" was released on January 30, 2007, as the lead single from McPhee's self-titled debut album. It was made available as a CD single and a digital download. When discussing its release, McPhee said that "it [is] not beating people over the head with the new Katharine." A remix extended play was released on May 8, 2007. In a 2007 interview with The News-Times, McPhee stated that she dislikes the song; she explained: "I tried the best to make it my own. I think it was a bit produced in the studio at the end of the day, so it ended up sounding a little bit more like just every other person singing it possible!"

German pop girl group Queensberry recorded a cover of "Over It" for their debut studio album Volume I (2008). Their version was produced by Henrik Menzel and Tommy "Petone" Peters. It was one of three songs included on the album originally performed by a talent show contestant; the other two are Clea's 2004 track "Sprung" and Anna Abreu's 2007 single "End of Love".

== Reception ==
"Over It" received mixed reviews from music critics. Elysa Gardner of USA Today praised it as a "superb single", and Slant Magazine's Preston Jones compared it to music by Canadian singer-songwriter Shania Twain. Jones identified "Over It" as an album highlight, describing it as an "expertly sculpted piece of fluff that will have heads bobbing and wallets opening". Sarah Rodman of The Boston Globe wrote that "Over It" is "a soul-spiced, mid-tempo kiss-off". In a less enthusiastic review, a writer for the Los Angeles Daily News referred to "Over It" and "Love Story" as "passable confections". Entertainment Weekly's Henry Goldblatt panned it for sounding like a rejected track from American singer JoJo. Rick Fulton of the Daily Record responded negatively to "Over It", writing: "This boring pop, like Britney's pants, went out the window years ago."

"Over It" debuted at number 48 on the Billboard Hot 100 chart, and peaked at number 29 on April 27, 2007; it remained on the chart for sixteen weeks. It reached number 22 on the Billboard Mainstream Top 40 chart, and stayed on the chart for eleven weeks. The song has sold over 645,000 downloads to date, and was certified Gold in 2008. "Over It" was featured on the reality television series The Hills, which resulted in its digital sales increasing by 60 percent to 40,000.

== Music video ==
Liz Friedlander directed the single's accompanying music video. It depicts McPhee recording herself while performing the song; she delivers the file to her unfaithful boyfriend at a basement party. McPhee said her clothing and performance were intended to reflect the different emotions of the song: "There's different looks to show the different levels of being over it. There's the mad over it, the sad over it, the vengeful over it." Two endings were filmed for the music video, one where she gives her boyfriend the tape and breaks up with him and another where she gives him a second chance. McPhee said that her fans would pick the ending for the official release. The first was chosen as the official ending, though the alternative was also uploaded on McPhee's Vevo channel.

== Track listing ==
=== Promo ===
1. Over It (Album Version) – 3:35
2. Over It (Call-Out Hook) – 0:10

=== Remixes ===
1. Over It (Mig Mix) – 3:20
2. Over It (Mig Mix – No Rap) – 3:20
3. Over It (Mig Instrumental) – 3:20
4. Over It (Funk Generation Club Show Mix) – 6:52
5. Over It (Funk Generation Mixshow) – 5:41
6. Over It (Funk Generation Radio Mix) – 3:46

== Credits and personnel ==
Credits adapted from the booklet of Katharine McPhee:

- Arranged By [Vocals, Additional] – Steve Ferrera
- Arranged By [Vocals], Acoustic Guitar, Keyboards, Programmed By [Bass & Drums] – Josh Alexander
- Backing Vocals – Denaine Jones, Ruth-Anne Cunningham, Sharon Youngblood
- Edited By – Chris Garcia (5), Dave Russell, Josh Alexander
- Producer – Billy Steinberg, Josh Alexander
- Producer [Vocals, Additional] – Steve Ferrera
- Recorded By – Ariel Chobaz, Dave Russell, Josh Alexander
- Recorded By [Additional] – James Edmunds
- Technician [Pro Tools & Logic] – Scott Roewe
- Written-By – Billy Steinberg, Josh Alexander, Ruth-Anne Cunningham

== Charts ==
Chart performance for "Over It"
| Chart (2007) | Peak position |
|---|---|
| Canada Hot 100 (Billboard) | 25 |
| Canada CHR/Top 40 (Billboard) | 34 |
| Canada Hot AC (Billboard) | 12 |
| US Billboard Hot 100 | 29 |
| US Adult Pop Airplay (Billboard) | 32 |
| US Pop Airplay (Billboard) | 22 |

== Certifications ==
| Region | Certification | Certified units/sales |
|---|---|---|
| United States (RIAA) | Gold | 500,000^{^} |
^{^} Shipments figures based on certification alone.

== Release history ==
| Region | Date | Format(s) | Label(s) | Ref. |
|---|---|---|---|---|
| United States | January 15, 2007 | Contemporary hit radio | RCA | |
| United States | May 8, 2007 | Digital download (Dance Vault Mixes) | RCA | |
