= My Destiny (Katharine McPhee song) =

Single by Katharine McPhee
- B-side: "Somewhere Over the Rainbow"
- Released: June 27, 2006
- Recorded: 2006
- Genre: Pop
- Length: 3:39
- Label: RCA
- Songwriters: Harry Sommerdahl; Hanne Sørvaag; Tim Baxter
- Producers: Harry Sommerdahl; Brad Gilderman

Katharine McPhee singles chronology
"Think" (2006)	"My Destiny" (2006)	"Over It" (2007)

"My Destiny" is a pop song performed by American Idol season 5 contestant Katharine McPhee and written by Harry Sommerdahl, Hanne Sørvaag, and Tim Baxter. McPhee first performed the song on the penultimate episode on May 23, 2006 at the Kodak Theatre.

The lyrics are about her destiny—to be with the one she loves and how she finds it difficult to believe that everything that she had always dreamt of is actually happening to her.

It was released as a CD single on June 27, 2006, with a cover of Eva Cassidy's unique 1996 version of "Somewhere Over the Rainbow" as the B-side. McPhee's rendition of "Somewhere Over the Rainbow" was originally performed during the top 3 finalists' judge's choice round, chosen by Simon Cowell. McPhee performed sitting on the stage and wearing red shoes. She sang the little-known opening verse a cappella. The judges had high praise for McPhee's performance, and it is believed that the song was responsible for vaulting her into the season's final two. Several critics, including Cowell, consider McPhee's performance to be the best of the entire series. McPhee reprised her performance of the song in the final performance show on May 23. Her version again received rave reviews.

She also performed "Black Horse and the Cherry Tree" a second time, though her title was not released as a single. When McPhee's record deal was officially announced on June 6, 2006, RCA Records announced that "Somewhere Over the Rainbow/My Destiny" would be considered a double A-side, meaning that radio stations could have the option of playing either song. This reflects the fact that McPhee's rendition of "Somewhere Over the Rainbow" has become her signature performance, just as it was for Eva Cassidy.

On June 20, 2006, McPhee's upcoming single was added on the iTunes Music Store, later being removed on June 24. It was made available again on June 27.

== Track listing ==
1. "Somewhere Over the Rainbow" - 3:30
2. "My Destiny" - 3:47

== Charts ==
"Somewhere Over the Rainbow/My Destiny"

Chart (2006)	Peak position
U.S. Single Sales	2

"My Destiny"

Chart (2006)	Peak position
U.S. Billboard Hot 100	60
U.S. Pop 100	42
U.S. Hot Digital Songs	31

"Somewhere Over the Rainbow"

Chart (2006)	Peak position
U.S. Billboard Hot 100	12
U.S. Pop 100	12
U.S. Hot Digital Songs	21
