= Katharine McPhee (album) =

Studio album by Katharine McPhee
- Released: January 30, 2007
- Recorded: September 2006–January 2007; Los Angeles, California, Virginia Beach, Virginia
- Length: 49:21
- Label: RCA; 19
- Producer: Walter Afanasieff; Josh Alexander; Babyface; Danja; Kara DioGuardi; Marti Frederiksen; Emanuel Kiriakou; Billy Steinberg; The Underdogs

Katharine McPhee chronology
Katharine McPhee (2007)	Unbroken (2010)

Singles from Katharine McPhee
- 1. "Over It" Released: January 15, 2007; 2. "Love Story" Released: March 30, 2007

Katharine McPhee is the debut studio album by American singer Katharine McPhee. It was released on January 30, 2007, by RCA Records in association with 19 Recordings Limited in North America. It was released on August 23, 2007, in Thailand and on February 20, 2008, in Japan. Produced after McPhee had finished second on the fifth season of American Idol, it features contributions from musicians such as Babyface, The Underdogs, and Kara DioGuardi. McPhee also collaborated with Nate “Danja” Hills who produced half of the album's 12 songs, three of which she co-wrote.

The album earned largely polarizing reviews from music critics, some of whom declared it a "pleasant pop surprise," while others panned the "poor material." It debuted at number two on the US Billboard 200, selling 116,000 copies in its first week, only behind singer Norah Jones' Not Too Late. Katharine McPhee produced two singles, including lead single "Over It," a pop breakup song that reached the top 30 on the US Billboard Hot 100, and follow-up "Love Story."

== Production ==
The album includes writing and production contributions from Babyface, The Underdogs, Kara DioGuardi, and Nate “Danja” Hills. It was also said that Ryan Leslie contributed to the album. However, none of the songs written or produced by him made the track listing. McPhee has described the album as rhythm pop, taking a different route from the traditional pop ballads she sang on American Idol.

== Promotion ==
On December 19, 2006, RCA released two songs, "I Lost You" and "Dangerous" as singles for a Walmart exclusive and also digitally, though the former was later cut from the final album track listing. On January 2, 2007, first single, "Over It", and three snippets, "Each Other"; "Love Story"; and "Open Toes", were released on AOL Music: First Listen. Also accompanied were photos, quotes from the credited artist, and fan polls. McPhee was reportedly quoted on AOL Music for describing the first single, "It's a term that everyone uses, especially young girls. I didn't even realize just how much I used it. A lot of people will be able to relate to this song. This is really the only pure pop song on the record, so I thought it would be a good first single." Released to radio on January 30, 2007, it peaked at number 29 on the US Billboard Hot 100 and sold over 645,000 downloads in the US.

The second single, "Love Story" was released internationally on March 30, 2007, and to US radio on May 29, 2007. It did not chart on Billboard. To date, it has sold 92,000 downloads in the US.

== Critical reception ==
Professional ratings
Review scores
Source	Rating
AllMusic	3/5 stars
Entertainment Weekly	C+
MTV Asia	6/10
Rolling Stone	2.5/5 stars
Slant	2/5 stars
USA Today	3/4 stars

Elysa Gardner from USA Today called the album "a pleasant pop surprise." She found that the "songs are generally solid and occasionally exceptional" and declared McPhee's "self-titled debut a worthwhile trip." AllMusic editor Stephen Thomas Erlewine rated the album three out of five stars and wrote: "Even if the album ultimately plays like a handful of good singles and filler, that's not too different than Kelly's debut, and even if McPhee isn't yet as charismatic as Clarkson, this record shows she has the raw ingredients to become a true pop star instead of merely playing one on TV." Kefela Sanneh from The New York Times noted that while a "few moments are pretty silly [...] part of what makes her debut album work is its brashness."

In his review for Rolling Stone, Christian Hoard remarked that McPhee's "debut doesn't render her halfway interesting. The album's twenty-two songwriters mostly avoid schlock but can't come up with an alternative, which makes ballads like "Better Off Alone" and tepid, McPhunky dance pop such as "Do What You Do" just bland. The upbeat "Love Story" and the decent ballad "Everywhere I Go" mix pop and R&B; and provide some relief, but most of Katharine McPhee is politics as usual." Entertainment Weekly's Henry Goldblatt praised McPhee's voice but called Katharine McPhee "poor material." He noted that the single "Over It" sounded "like a JoJo leftover; and some midtempo ballads that Mariah would've deemed too banal in 1991. Only on the Babyface-penned "Everywhere I Go" does a snapshot of an intriguing Toni Braxton-esque pop star develop."

== Commercial performance ==
The album's release date changed on many occasions. Originally it was set for November 14, then November 28, December 5, December 19, and eventually — at McPhee's insistence — January 30, 2007. Katharine McPhee sold 116,000 copies in its first week, debuting at number two on the US Billboard 200 chart, only behind Norah Jones' Not Too Late. By 2009, the album had sold over 378,000 copies.

== Track listing ==
Katharine McPhee track listing
No.	Title	Writer(s)	Producer(s)	Length
1.	"Love Story"	Nate Hills; Kara DioGuardi; Corte Ellis	Danja	3:08
2.	"Over It"	Josh Alexander; Billy Steinberg; Ruth-Anne Cunningham	Alexander; Steinberg	3:35
3.	"Open Toes"	Katharine McPhee; Balewa Muhammad; Candice Nelson; Hills; DioGuardi	Danja	3:23
4.	"Home"	DioGuardi; John Shanks	DioGuardi; Marti Frederiksen	4:07
5.	"Not Ur Girl"	McPhee; Hills; DioGuardi; Ellis	Danja	3:58
6.	"Each Other"	Hills; DioGuardi; Ellis	Danja	3:59
7.	"Dangerous"	Hills; Ellis	Danja	3:51
8.	"Ordinary World"	Walter Afanasieff; Emanuel Kiriakou; Lindy Robbins	Afanasieff; Kiriakou	3:50
9.	"Do What You Do"	Harvey Mason, Jr.; Damon Thomas; James Fauntleroy; Makeba Riddick; Robin Tadross	The Underdogs	3:13
10.	"Better Off Alone"	Austin Carroll; Susan Marshall	Kiriakou	4:04
11.	"Neglected"	McPhee; Hills; DioGuardi; Muhammad	Danja	4:50
12.	"Everywhere I Go"	Babyface; Ernest Dixon	Babyface	3:48
Total length:				48:17

== Charts ==
=== Weekly charts ===
Weekly chart performance for Katharine McPhee
Chart (2007)	Peak position
US Billboard 200	2

=== Year-end charts ===
Year-end chart performance for Katharine McPhee
Chart (2007)	Position
US Billboard 200	159
