= Karrin Allyson =

American jazz vocalist (born 1963)

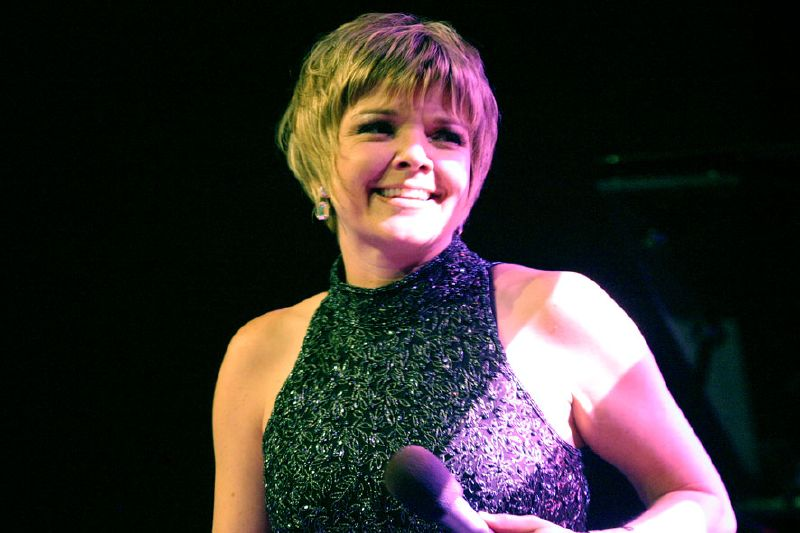

Background information
- Born: Karrin Allyson Schoonover; July 27, 1963 (age 63); Great Bend, Kansas, U.S.
- Genres: Jazz, vocal jazz
- Occupation: Singer
- Instrument: Piano
- Years active: 1987–present
- Labels: Concord, Kasrecords
- Website: karrin.com

Karrin Allyson (/ˈkɑːrɪn/; born Karrin Allyson Schoonover on July 27, 1963) is an American jazz vocalist. She has been nominated for five Grammy Awards and has received positive reviews from several prominent sources, including the New York Times, which has called her a "singer with a feline touch and impeccable intonation."

== Early life and education ==
Karrin Allyson was born in Great Bend, Kansas; her father was a Lutheran minister and her mother was a psychotherapist, teacher, and classical pianist. She grew up in Omaha, Nebraska, and spent her last year of high school in San Francisco. In her youth, she studied classical piano, sang at her local church and in musical theatre, and also began songwriting.

Allyson attended the University of Nebraska Omaha on a classical piano scholarship; she majored in classical piano and minored in French. She was lead singer for an all-female rock band called Tomboy. She also developed an avid interest in jazz, performing both in a jazz swing choir in college and in her own jazz ensemble, which had gigs at venues in Omaha. In 2022 she was awarded an honorary Doctor of Fine Arts degree from The University of Nebraska Omaha.

== Career ==
After graduating from college in 1986, Allyson moved to Minneapolis and concentrated on her jazz career. In 1990, she moved to Kansas City, where her career took off. In 1992 she recorded her debut album, I Didn't Know About You, which was so well received it was re-released on Concord Records in 1993. She subsequently recorded eight more Concord-released albums in Kansas City. In 1998, she moved to New York City with her longtime partner, classical music radio host Bill McGlaughlin, whom she met in Kansas City in the early 1990s.

Allyson sings in English, French, and Portuguese. The songs she performs are drawn from a variety of genres, including bossa nova, blues, bebop, samba, jazz standards, and other jazz modalities, and also ballads, pop standards, the Great American Songbook, soft rock, and folk rock. She has also recorded vocal performances of several instrumental jazz compositions, using both scat and vocalese techniques. She has recorded 12 original studio albums for the Concord Jazz label, and in 2009 she released a career-spanning "best of" collection. Her first all-original record, Some of That Sunshine, was released in August 2018 to rave reviews, with Jazz Times writing that "Allyson unleashes her equally impressive dexterity as a songwriter."

Five of Allyson's albums have received Grammy nominations for Best Jazz Vocal Album: Ballads: Remembering John Coltrane (2001), Footprints (2006), Imagina: Songs of Brasil (2008), 'Round Midnight (2011), and Many a New Day: Karrin Allyson Sings Rodgers & Hammerstein (2015)

== Personal life ==
Allyson lives in New York City. Her longtime partner was composer, conductor, and classical-music radio host Bill McGlaughlin (1943–2026), whom she met in 1990 in Kansas City. McGlaughlin co-produced and assisted on most of Allyson's CDs, and also often accompanied her on the road when she toured. Beginning in 2020, they co-hosted B&K Cafe, an hour-long monthly light classical music and jazz program, with commentary, on the WWFM network. The couple married in 2025 after 35 years of partnership. McGlaughlin died from sudden cardiac arrest on July 21, 2026, at the age of 82.

== Discography ==
- I Didn't Know About You (Concord Jazz, 1993)
- Sweet Home Cookin' (Concord Jazz, 1994)
- Azure-Té (Concord Jazz, 1995)
- Collage (Concord Jazz, 1996)
- Daydream (Concord Jazz, 1997)
- From Paris to Rio (Concord, 1999)
- Ballads: Remembering John Coltrane (Concord Jazz, 2001)
- Yuletide Hideaway (Kas, 2001)
- In Blue (Concord Jazz, 2002)
- Wild for You (Concord, 2004)
- Footprints (Concord Jazz, 2006)
- Imagina: Songs of Brasil (Concord Jazz, 2008)
- 'Round Midnight (Concord Jazz, 2011)
- Many a New Day: Karrin Allyson Sings Rodgers & Hammerstein (Motema, 2015)
- Some of That Sunshine (Kas, 2018)
- The Karrin Allyson Sextet, Shoulder to Shoulder: A Centennial Tribute to Women's Suffrage (eOne Music, 2019)
- A Kiss For Brazil (Origin, 2024)
