= 1956 in jazz =

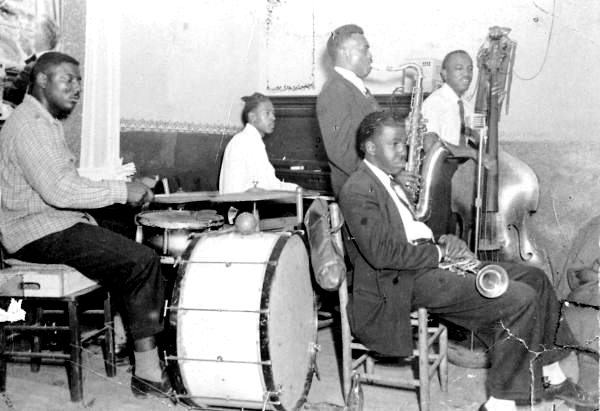
- Musicians performing in Tom's Tavern club at Gonzalez and Railroad streets: Pensacola, Florida, 1956
- Decade: 1950s in jazz
- Music: 1956 in music
- Standards: List of post-1950 jazz standards
- See also: 1955 in jazz – 1957 in jazz

This is a timeline documenting events of Jazz in the year 1956.

== Events ==
=== July ===
- 5 – The 5th Newport Jazz Festival started in Newport, Rhode Island (July 5 – 7).
- 7 – Duke Ellington and his band performs at the Newport Jazz Festival. The album Ellington at Newport devises a landmark performance which is capped by an amazing tenor saxophone solo by Paul Gonsalves on "Diminuendo" and "Crescendo in Blue".

Unknown date

- The guitarist Mundell Lowe brings pianist Bill Evans to the attention of Orin Keepnews and Bill Grauer of Riverside records.
- Dizzy Gillespie meets Argentine pianist Lalo Schifrin and is impressed. Dizzy continues to gravitate to the Latin rhythms.
- Miles Davis and his quintet record four records (Cookin' , Relaxin' , Workin' and Steamin' ) for Prestige, spending only two days in the studio to complete. Miles also records 'Round about Midnight on the Columbia label.

== Album releases ==
- Art Blakey & The Jazz Messengers: The Jazz Messengers
- Kenny Burrell: All Night Long
- Anita O'Day: Anita
- Rosemary Clooney: Blue Rose
- Chris Connor: Chris Connor
- Miles Davis: Round About Midnight (released 1957 - recorded 1955 and 1956)
- Jimmy Giuffre: The Jimmy Giuffre Clarinet
- Quincy Jones: This Is How I Feel About Jazz
- Stan Kenton: Cuban Fire!
- Peggy Lee: Black Coffee (Reissue)
- John Lewis: Grand Encounter
- Charles Mingus: Pithecanthropus Erectus
- Modern Jazz Quartet: Fontessa
- Phineas Newborn: Piano Artistry
- Max Roach: Max Roach + 4
- Sonny Rollins
  - "Sonny Rollins Plus 4"
  - "Tenor Madness"
  - "Work Time"
- George Russell:The Jazz Workshop
- John Serry Sr.: Squeeze Play
- Horace Silver: Six Pieces of Silver
- Zoot Sims: Tonite's Music Today
- Jimmy Smith: A New Star A New Sound
- Cecil Taylor: Jazz Advance
- Lucky Thompson: Tricotism
- Mel Torme: Touch
- Lennie Tristano: Manhattan Studio/ New York Improvisations

== Deaths ==
May

- 13 – Don Kirkpatrick, American pianist and arranger (born 1905).
- 15 – Adrian Rollini, American bass saxophonist (born 1903).
- 30 – Valaida Snow, African-American jazz musician and entertainer (born 1904).

June

- 11 – Frankie Trumbauer, American saxophonists (born 1901).
- 26
  - Clifford Brown, American trumpeter (born 1930).
  - Richie Powell, American bebop pianist (born 1931).

July

- 7 – Alex Hyde, American bandleader and violinist (born 1898).
- 11 – Ernst Höllerhagen, German reedist (born 1912).

September

- 8 – Fred Rich, Polish-born American bandleader and composer (born 1898).

October

- 11 – Harry Parry, Welsh clarinetist and bandleader (born 1912).

November

- 5 – Art Tatum, American pianist and virtuoso (born 1909).
- 7 – Una Mae Carlisle, American singer, pianist, and songwriter (born 1915).
- 20 – Achille Baquet, American clarinetist and saxophonist (born 1885).
- 26 – Tommy Dorsey, American trombonist, trumpeter, composer, and bandleader (born 1905).

Unknown date

- Joe Appleton, British saxophonist and clarinetist from the West Indies (born 1900).

== Births ==
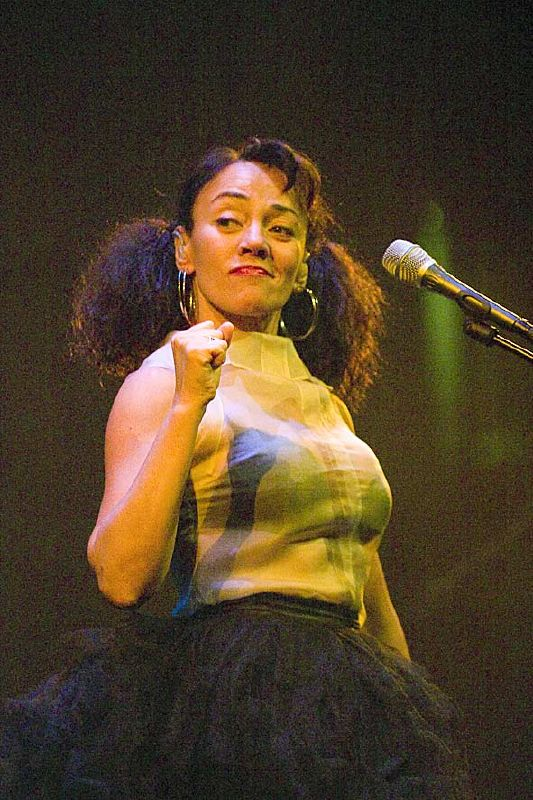
Maria João

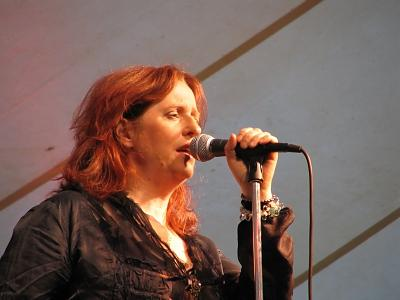
Mary Coughlan performing live

January

- 1 – Ziad Rahbani, Lebanese composer, pianist, playwright, and political commentator.
- 4
  - Alex Cline, American drummer.
  - Nels Cline, American guitarist and composer.
- 7 – Steve Williams, American drummer.
- 21 – Kevin Norton, American percussionist and composer.
- 23 – Ralph Carney, American saxophonist and clarinetist, Tin Huey (died 2017).
- 24 – Mitchel Forman, American keyboardist.
- 26 – Steve Dobrogosz, American pianist and composer.

February

- 5 – Vinnie Colaiuta, American drummer.
- 11
  - Didier Lockwood, French violinist, Magma (died 2018).
  - Raoul Björkenheim, Finnish-American guitarist.
- 15 – Nils Landgren, Swedish trombone player.
- 20 – Riccardo Del Fra, Italian upright bassist, bandleader, composer, and arranger.
- 28 – Jens Wendelboe, Norwegian trombonist and orchestra leader.

March

- 2 – Danilo Terenzi, Italian trombonist and composer (died 1995).
- 4 – Kermit Driscoll, American bassist.

April

- 2 – Károly Binder, Hungarian pianist.
- 3 – Tessa Souter, English singer, songwriter, and writer.
- 4 – Gary Smulyan, American baritone saxophonist.
- 9 – Michael Hashim, American jazz alto saxophonist.
- 16 – T Lavitz, American keyboardist, composer and producer (died 2010).
- 19 – Denardo Coleman, American drummer.
- 27 – Anna Lyman, Canadian Jazz, Latin Vocalist composer, and recording artist of Mexican American extraction.

May

- 5 – Mary Coughlan, Irish jazz and folk singer, and actress.
- 8 – Jean-Marc Jafet, French bassist and guitarist.
- 13 – Oskar Aichinger, Austrian pianist.
- 14 – Bruce Forman, American guitarist.
- 15 – Mathias Claus, German jazz pianist and composer.
- 21 – Wolfgang Puschnig, Austrian saxophonist.
- 26 – Quanti Bomani, Afro-Caribbean multi-instrumentalist and composer.

June

- 5 – Kenny G, American saxophonist.
- 8 – Uri Caine, American pianist and composer.
- 11 – Jamaaladeen Tacuma, American bassist.
- 19 – Aaron Scott, American composer and drummer.
- 26 – Bill Cunliffe, American jazz pianist and composer.
- 27 – Maria João, Portuguese singer.

July

- 5 – Billy Jenkins, English guitarist, composer, and bandleader.
- 6 – John Jorgenson, American guitarist and banjo player, Desert Rose Band and Hellecasters.
- 17 – Lucien Barbarin, American trombonist.
- 18 – Hein van de Geyn, Dutch upright bassist, composer and band leader.
- 19 – Marit Sandvik, Norwegian singer.
- 21 – Franklin Kiermyer, Canadian drummer, composer and bandleader.
- 24 – Denis Colin, French bass clarinettist and composer.
- 26 – Wayne Krantz, American guitarist.

August

- 13 – Gast Waltzing, Luxembourgian trumpeter and composer.
- 15 – Lorraine Desmarais, French-Canadian jazz pianist and composer.
- 24 – Mimi Fox, American guitarist and educator.
- 29 – Doug Raney, American guitarist (died 2016).
- 30 - Rodney Jones, American guitarist and educator.

September

- 1 – Hilde Hefte, Norwegian singer.
- 8 – Eivin One Pedersen, Norwegian accordionist and pianist (died 2012).
- 12 – Brian Lynch, American trumpeter.
- 15 –
  - Ned Rothenberg, American multi-instrumentalist and composer.
  - George Howard, American saxophonist (died 1998).
- 19 – Wolfgang Lackerschmid, German vibraphonist, bandleader, and composer.
- 20 – Steve Coleman, American saxophonist, composer, and bandleader.

October

- 9 – Geir Langslet, Norwegian pianist.
- 10 – Johnny O'Neal, American pianist and vocalist.
- 20 – Martin Taylor, British guitarist.
- 22 – Jane Bunnett, Canadian soprano saxophonist, flautist, and bandleader.
- 23
  - Dianne Reeves, American singer.
  - Svein Dag Hauge, Norwegian guitarist.
- 26 – Mike LeDonne, American pianist and organist.
- 27 – Ben Besiakov, Danish pianist and keyboardist.
- 28 – Liz Story, American pianist and composer.
- 29 – David Chesky, American pianist, composer, producer, arranger, and co-founder of the label Chesky Records.
- 31 – Bob Belden, American saxophonist, arranger, composer, bandleader, and producer (died 2015).

November

- 1 – Tim Landers, American bass guitarist, composer and record producer.
- 2 – Frank Kimbrough, American pianist.
- 7
  - Denise Jannah, Dutch vocalist.
  - Iro Haarla, Finnish pianist and composer.
  - Mikhail Alperin, Ukrainian born jazz pianist, member of the Moscow Art Trio, professor at the Norwegian Academy of Music (died 2018).
- 10 – Louis Mhlanga, Zimbabwean guitarist.
- 12 – Satoshi Inoue, Japanese guitarist.
- 18 – Tiziano Tononi, Italian percussionist and composer.

December

- 3 – Rob Waring, American-Norwegian vibraphonist.
- 5 – Randy Johnston, American guitarist.
- 12 – Geir Holmsen, Norwegian bassist.
- 18 – Chris Murrell, American singer (died 2017).
- 21 – Zeena Parkins, American harpist.
- 24 – Ralph Moore, English saxophonist.
- 27 – Karl Denson, American saxophonist, flutist, and vocalist.

Unknown date

- Chris Wilson, Australian singer and guitarist (died 2019).
- Gregg Karukas, smooth jazz pianist.
- Lee Pui Ming, Hong Kong-born American pianist, vocalist, and composer.
- Nicola Stilo, Italian flautist, guitarist, and pianist.
- Raymond Strid, Swedish drummer.
- Reiner Michalke, German musician and artistic director of the Moers Festival.

== See also ==
- 1950s in jazz
- List of years in jazz
- 1956 in music

== Bibliography ==
- The New Real Book, Volume I. Sher Music. 1988. ISBN 0-9614701-4-3.
- The New Real Book, Volume II. Sher Music. 1991. ISBN 0-9614701-7-8.
- The New Real Book, Volume III. Sher Music. 1995. ISBN 1-883217-30-X.
- The Real Book, Volume I (6th ed.). Hal Leonard. 2004. ISBN 0-634-06038-4.
- The Real Book, Volume II (2nd ed.). Hal Leonard. 2007. ISBN 978-1-4234-2452-9.
- The Real Book, Volume III (2nd ed.). Hal Leonard. 2006. ISBN 0-634-06136-4.
- The Real Jazz Book. Warner Bros. ISBN 978-91-85041-36-7.
- The Real Vocal Book, Volume I. Hal Leonard. 2006. ISBN 0-634-06080-5.
