= Daahoud =

Studio album by Clifford Brown & Max Roach Quintet
- Released: 1973
- Recorded: August 3 & 6, 1954
- Genre: Jazz
- Label: Mainstream

Daahoud is an album by Max Roach and Clifford Brown released on Mainstream Records in 1973 consisting of alternate takes of tracks recorded in 1954 for the albums Brown and Roach Incorporated and Clifford Brown & Max Roach.

== Reception ==
Professional ratings
Review scores
Source	Rating
Allmusic	4.5/5 stars

Allmusic awarded the album 4½ stars stating "Anything with Clifford Brown belongs in a jazz (or American music) collection".

== Track listing ==
All compositions by Clifford Brown except as indicated

1. "Daahoud" [alternate take] - 4:09
2. "I Don't Stand a Ghost of a Chance with You" [alternate take] (Bing Crosby, Ned Washington, Victor Young) - 2:59
3. "Joy Spring" [alternate take] - 6:34
4. "I Get a Kick out of You" [alternate take] (Cole Porter) - 7:27
5. "These Foolish Things (Remind Me of You)" (Harry Link, Holt Marvell, Jack Strachey) - 3:45
6. "Mildama" [alternate take] - 4:30

== Personnel ==
- Clifford Brown - trumpet
- Max Roach - drums
- Harold Land - tenor sax
- George Morrow - bass
- Richie Powell - piano
