= Clifford Brown with Strings =

Studio album by Clifford Brown
- Released: 1955
- Recorded: January 18–20, 1955; New York, NY
- Genre: Jazz
- Length: 40:06
- Labels: EmArcy; MG 36005

Clifford Brown chronology
Brown and Roach Incorporated (1954)	Clifford Brown with Strings (1955)	Study in Brown (1995)

Clifford Brown with Strings is a 1955 studio album by trumpeter Clifford Brown, with string arrangements by Neal Hefti, recorded on January 18–20, 1955, and released the same year by EmArcy Records.

== Reception ==
Professional ratings
Review scores
Source	Rating
AllMusic	3/5 stars
The Penguin Guide to Jazz Recordings	3.5/4 stars
The Rolling Stone Jazz Record Guide	3/5 stars

Scott Yanow's AllMusic review stated, "Brownie plays quite beautifully and shows off his warm tone ... But on the other hand the string arrangements by Neal Hefti border on muzak and Brown never really departs from the melody. So the trumpeter's tone is the only reason to acquire this disc which to this listener is a slight disappointment, not living up to its potential."

For All About Jazz, Chris May wrote that the album "may not have been the first album in the field, but it is surely among the most beautiful of jazz discs ever to be made with strings ... the sound is deep and lush, and the six violins, two violas and a cello sound like an ensemble larger than its actual size."

== Track listing ==
No.	Title	Writer(s)	Length
1.	"Yesterdays"	Jerome Kern; Otto Harbach	2:59
2.	"Laura"	David Raksin; Johnny Mercer	3:26
3.	"What's New?"	Bob Haggart; Johnny Burke	3:23
4.	"Blue Moon"	Richard Rodgers; Lorenz Hart	3:13
5.	"Can't Help Lovin' Dat Man"	Kern; Oscar Hammerstein II	3:43
6.	"Embraceable You"	George Gershwin; Ira Gershwin	3:00
7.	"Willow Weep for Me"	Ann Ronell	3:24
8.	"Memories of You"	Eubie Blake; Andy Razaf	3:31
9.	"Smoke Gets in Your Eyes"	Kern; Harbach	3:14
10.	"Portrait of Jenny"	J. Russel Robinson; Gordon Burdge	3:24
11.	"Where or When"	Rodgers; Hart	3:26
12.	"Stardust"	Hoagy Carmichael; Mitchell Parish	3:23
Total length:			40:06

== Personnel ==
- Clifford Brown – trumpet
- Richie Powell – piano
- Max Roach – drums
- George Morrow – double bass
- Barry Galbraith – guitar
- Neal Hefti – arranger, conductor
- Un-credited string nonet arranged by Hefti
