= Clifford Brown and Max Roach at Basin Street =

Studio album by Clifford Brown, Max Roach
- Released: 1956
- Recorded: January 4 and February 16–17, 1956
- Genre: Jazz, hard bop
- Length: 46:03
- Label: EmArcy, Verve, Trip Records (reissue)
- Producer: Bob Shad

Clifford Brown chronology
Clifford Brown & Max Roach (1955)	Clifford Brown and Max Roach at Basin Street (1956)

Max Roach chronology
The Charles Mingus Quartet plus Max Roach (1955)	Clifford Brown and Max Roach at Basin Street (1956)	Max Roach + 4 (1956)

Professional ratings
Review scores
Source	Rating
AllMusic	4.5/5 stars
The Rolling Stone Jazz Record Guide	5/5 stars
The Penguin Guide to Jazz Recordings	3.5/4 stars
Tom Hull	A−

Clifford Brown and Max Roach at Basin Street (also known as At Basin Street) is a 1956 album by the Clifford Brown and Max Roach Quintet, the last album the quintet officially recorded. Apart from Sonny Rollins Plus 4, it was the last studio album Brown and pianist Richie Powell recorded before their deaths in June that year. The title is a reference to the Basin Street East jazz club, where the quintet had performed several times.

== Track listing ==
All tracks arranged by Richie Powell except 6.

1. "What Is This Thing Called Love?" (Cole Porter) – 7:33
2. "Love Is a Many-Splendored Thing" (Sammy Fain, Paul Francis Webster) – 4:13
3. "I'll Remember April" (Gene de Paul, Patricia Johnston, Don Raye) – 9:13
4. "Powell's Prances" (Richie Powell) – 3:28
5. "Time" (Richie Powell) – 5:03
6. "The Scene Is Clean" (Tadd Dameron, arr. Dameron) – 6:04
7. "Gertrude's Bounce" (Richie Powell) – 4:09
  Bonus tracks included on the 2002 CD release:
8. "Step Lightly (Junior's Arrival)" (Benny Golson) – 3:33
9. "Flossie Lou" (Dameron) – 3:55
10. "What Is This Thing Called Love? (alternate take)" – 8:18
11. "Love Is a Many-Splendored Thing (breakdown)" – 0:45
12. "Love Is a Many-Splendored Thing (alternate take)" – 3:53
13. "I'll Remember April (breakdown)" – 1:25
14. "I'll Remember April (alternate take)" – 9:42
15. "Flossie Lou (alternate take)" – 4:00

== Personnel ==
- Clifford Brown - trumpet
- Sonny Rollins – tenor saxophone
- Richie Powell – piano, celesta
- George Morrow – double bass
- Max Roach – drums

== Critical reception ==
The album was identified by Scott Yanow in his AllMusic essay "Hard Bop" as one of the 17 Essential Hard Bop Recordings.
