= Tour de Force (Sonny Rollins album) =

1958 studio album by Sonny Rollins

Studio album by Sonny Rollins
- Released: March 1958
- Recorded: December 7, 1956
- Studio: Van Gelder Studio, Hackensack, New Jersey
- Genre: Jazz
- Length: 41:40
- Label: Prestige (PR 7126)
- Producer: Bob Weinstock

Sonny Rollins chronology
Rollins Plays for Bird (1956)	Tour de Force (1958)	Sonny Boy (1956)

Tour de Force is an album by jazz saxophonist Sonny Rollins containing his final recordings for the Prestige label. Rollins performed with Kenny Drew, George Morrow, and Max Roach, with vocals by Earl Coleman on two tracks.

== Reception ==
Professional ratings
Review scores
Source	Rating
AllMusic	3/5 stars
The Penguin Guide to Jazz	4/4 stars
The Rolling Stone Jazz Record Guide	4/5 stars

The AllMusic review by Scott Yanow states: "Rollins was in consistently creative form during this prime period but the overall set is not as classic as most of the tenor's other recordings from the 1950s." The Penguin Guide to Jazz describes it as being "almost as good as Colossus, with the ferocious abstractions of 'B Swift' and 'B Quick' contrasting with the methodical, almost surgical destruction of 'Sonny Boy'."

== Track listing ==
All compositions by Sonny Rollins except where noted.

1. "Ee-Ah" – 6:52
2. "B. Quick" – 9:13
3. "Two Different Worlds" (Al Frisch, Sid Wayne) – 7:37
4. "B. Swift" – 5:15
5. "My Ideal" (Newell Chase, Leo Robin, Richard A. Whiting) – 4:21
6. "Sonny Boy" (Lew Brown, Buddy DeSylva, Ray Henderson, Al Jolson) – 8:22 Bonus track on CD rerelease

== Personnel ==
- Sonny Rollins – tenor saxophone
- Kenny Drew – piano
- George Morrow – bass
- Max Roach – drums
- Earl Coleman – vocals (tracks 3, 5)
