= George Morrow (bassist) =

American jazz musician

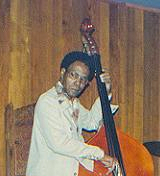
- George Morrow in 1978

Background information
- Born: August 15, 1925; Pasadena, California
- Died: May 26, 1992 (aged 66) Orlando, Florida
- Genres: Jazz
- Occupation: Musician
- Instruments: Double bass
- Years active: 1948–1992

George Morrow (August 15, 1925 – May 26, 1992) was an American jazz double bassist. Although most closely associated with Max Roach and Clifford Brown, Morrow also appears on recordings by Sonny Rollins and Sonny Stitt.

== Biography ==
Morrow was born in Pasadena, California. After leaving the military, he played with Charlie Parker, Sonny Criss, Teddy Edwards, Hampton Hawes and other musicians who were in Los Angeles. He then spent five years in San Francisco between 1948 and 1953, often appearing at the Bop City jazz club and working with Dexter Gordon, Wardell Gray, Billie Holiday and Sonny Clark.

According to Roach, Morrow had been "free-lancing around San Francisco clubs" when they hired him after rejecting two other bassists. He appeared on all of the studio albums by the Clifford Brown-Max Roach Quintet. After the band dissolved due to the deaths of Brown and Richie Powell in a car accident, Morrow continued recording with Roach's band. He also worked with Anita O'Day in the 1970s before joining the Disney World house band in 1976. He died in Orlando, Florida.

== Discography ==
With David Amram

- The Young Savages: An Original Sound Track Recording (Columbia, 1960 [1961])

With Curtis Amy

- Way Down (Pacific Jazz, 1962) – with Victor Feldman

With Earl Anderza

- Outa Sight (Pacific Jazz, 1962 [1963])

With Chet Baker

- (Chet Baker Sings) It Could Happen to You (Riverside, 1958)

With Clifford Brown

- Clifford Brown with Strings (EmArcy, 1955)

With Clifford Brown and Max Roach

- Brown and Roach Incorporated (EmArcy, 1954 [1955])
- Clifford Brown & Max Roach (Emarcy, 1954)
- Daahoud (Mainstream, 1954 [1973])
- The Best of Max Roach and Clifford Brown in Concert (GNP Crescendo, 1954 [1956])
- Jam Session (EmArcy, 1954) – with Maynard Ferguson and Clark Terry
- Study in Brown (EmArcy, 1955)
- Live at the Bee Hive (Columbia, 1955 [1979])
- Clifford Brown and Max Roach at Basin Street (EmArcy, 1956)
- Pure Genius Vol. 1 (Elektra/Musician, 1956 [1982]) – with Sonny Rollins and Richie Powell

With Anita O'Day

- Cool Heat (Verve, 1959)

With Max Roach

- Max Roach + 4 (EmArcy, 1956)
- Jazz in ¾ Time (EmArcy, 1956–57 [1957])
- MAX (Argo, 1958)
- The Max Roach 4 Plays Charlie Parker (EmArcy, 1958 [1959])

With Sonny Rollins

- Work Time (Prestige, 1955 [1956])
- Rollins Plays for Bird (Prestige, 1956 [1957])
- Sonny Boy (Prestige, 1956 [1961])
- Sonny Rollins Plus 4 (Riverside, 1956)
- Tour de Force (Prestige, 1956 [1958])

With Gene Russell

- Up and Away (Decca, 1967)

With Sonny Stitt

- The Hard Swing (Verve, 1959)
- Sonny Stitt Swings the Most (Verve, 1959 [1960])

With Dinah Washington

- Dinah Jams (EmArcy, 1954 [1955])
