= I'll Remember April (song) =

1941 jazz standard

Song
- Published: 1941 by Leeds Music
- Composer: Gene de Paul
- Lyricists: Patricia Johnston and Don Raye

"I'll Remember April" is a popular song and jazz standard with music written in 1941 by Gene de Paul, and lyrics by Patricia Johnston and Don Raye. It made its debut in the 1942 Abbott and Costello comedy Ride 'Em Cowboy, being sung by Dick Foran. The lyric uses the seasons of the year metaphorically to illustrate the growth and death of a romance. The lyric also uses the ideas of the hours in a day and the flames of a fire to illustrate a relationship growing stronger and subsequently losing strength. Another interpretation is the use of spring (the month of April) to express the loves that were had in youth and remember them when the autumn of life arrives with affection and nostalgia, smiling: "I'll remember April and I smile". The song has been described as one which makes use of nostalgia.

The song is performed, along with several others, in the 1945 film I'll Remember April, a musical comedy-drama. In that movie, it is sung by Kirby Grant and Gloria Jean. A number of artists have covered the song as listed below. One of the most notable live renditions of it is a radio performance by Judy Garland, on a broadcast of Lux Radio Theatre.

'I'll Remember April' can be found in the Real Book tacit vol 1. It also appears as background music in the Adam-12 episode "Something Worth Dying For", in which Officer Reed (played by Kent McCord) is given the Medal of Valor.

== Notable recordings ==
- Cannonball Adderley for his album Cannonball Enroute (1958)
- Chet Baker - for the album Witch Doctor with The Lighthouse All Stars (1953)
- Don Shirley for his album Piano (1959)
- Shirley Bassey - included in her album The Fabulous Shirley Bassey (1959)
- Clifford Brown and Max Roach from the album At Basin Street (1956). -Studio recording with Sonny Rollins
- June Christy - for her album This Is June Christy (1958), also on Cool Christy (2002)
- Sonny Clark - a solo piano performance from the album Sonny Clark Trio (1957)
- Wynton Marsalis - for his album Standard Time, Vol. 2: Intimacy Calling (1991)
- Perry Como - for his album By Request (1962)
- Bing Crosby - recorded July 7, 1944 with John Scott Trotter and His Orchestra.
- Bobby Darin - for his album That's All (1959)
- Miles Davis - on the 12 inch album Blue Haze (1954)
- Bill Evans - for the album Some Other Time (1968)
- Erroll Garner - for the live album Concert by the Sea (1955)
- Matthew Gee for the album Jazz by Gee (1956)
- Stan Getz - for the album Stan Getz at The Shrine (1954), with Bob Brookmeyer. Also a slightly longer studio version with Bob was recorded in the Interpretations series
- Dizzy Gillespie for the Live album The Dizzy Gillespie Big 7 (1975)
- Dexter Gordon for the album Biting the Apple (1975)
- Eydie Gormé included in her album Love Is a Season (1959).
- Robert Goulet - for the album I Remember You (1966).
- Grant Green - for the album Standards: recorded in 1961 (1998)
- Woody Herman - this charted briefly in 1942.
- Julie London - included in her album Calendar Girl (1956)
- Carmen McRae - included in her album By Special Request (1956).
- Charles Mingus - for his album The Charles Mingus Quintet & Max Roach Live at the Café Bohemia (1955)
- The Modern Jazz Quartet - from the album European Concert (1960)
- Gerry Mulligan - for his album California Concerts - Zoot Sims feature (1954)
- Charlie Parker - with strings (1950)
- Art Pepper - included in his album I'll Remember April (1983). Vol. 3 of Art Pepper Memorial Collection
- Sonny Rollins - A Night at the Village Vanguard (1957)
- Kenny Drew - included in his album Kenny Drew and his progressive piano (1954)
- Dinah Shore - included in her album Moments Like These (1958).
- Frank Sinatra - included in his album Point of No Return (1962)
- Dinah Washington from the album Dinah Jams (1954)
