= Max Roach + 4 =

Studio album by Max Roach
- Released: October 12, 1956
- Recorded: September 17, 19 & 20, 1956; New York City
- Genre: Jazz, hard bop
- Length: 37:38
- Label: EmArcy; MG 36098
- Producer: Bob Shad

Max Roach chronology
Clifford Brown and Max Roach at Basin Street (1956)	Max Roach + 4 (1956)	Jazz in ¾ Time (1956-57)

Max Roach + 4 is an LP recorded by jazz drummer Max Roach, which featured Kenny Dorham on trumpet, Sonny Rollins on tenor sax, Ray Bryant on piano, and George Morrow on bass. It was the first album Roach recorded after his collaborators, trumpeter Clifford Brown and pianist Richie Powell, died in a car crash in June 1956.

== Reception ==
Professional ratings
Review scores
Source	Rating
Allmusic	4.5/5 stars
The Rolling Stone Jazz Record Guide	5/5 stars
DownBeat	4/5 stars
Tom Hull	A−

Allmusic awarded the album 4½ stars calling it a "worthy set". Don Gold praised the album, commenting on the replacement of Brown with Dorham that "Dorham is more than merely competent, apart from comparison with Clifford, and could, however, become more of an inspirational factor within the group in time."

== Track listing ==
All compositions by Max Roach except as indicated

1. "Ezz-Thetic" (George Russell) – 9:18
2. "Dr. Free-Zee" – 2:06
3. "Just One of Those Things" (Cole Porter) – 7:18
4. "Mr X." – 5:15
5. "Body and Soul" (Edward Heyman, Robert Sour, Frank Eyton, Johnny Green) – 6:50
6. "Woody 'n' You" (Dizzy Gillespie) – 6:51
7. "It Don't Mean a Thing (If It Ain't Got That Swing)" (Duke Ellington, Irving Mills) - 4:45 Bonus track on CD reissue
8. "Love Letters" (Edward Heyman, Victor Young) - 8:57 Bonus track on CD reissue
9. "Minor Trouble" (Ray Bryant) - 6:58 Bonus track on CD reissue
- Recorded in New York City on September 17 (tracks 3–5) and September 19 (tracks 1, 2 & 6), 1956 and at Capitol Tower Studios in Hollywood, California on March 18 (tracks 7 & 8) and March 20 (track 9), 1957

== Personnel ==
- Max Roach - drums
- Kenny Dorham - trumpet
- Sonny Rollins - tenor saxophone
- Ray Bryant (tracks 1–6), Bill Wallace (tracks 7–9) - piano
- George Morrow - bass
