= Darn That Dream =

Song composed by Jimmy Van Heusen

"Darn That Dream" is a popular song composed by Jimmy Van Heusen with lyrics by Eddie DeLange. It was published in 1939 and ranked No. 1 in 1940 when a recording was released by Benny Goodman in an arrangement by Eddie Sauter with Mildred Bailey singing the vocal. Other popular recordings in 1940 were by Blue Barron & His Orchestra (vocal by Russ Carlyle) (#14 in Billboard charts) and by Tommy Dorsey (vocal by Anita Boyer) (#16 in Billboard charts).

The song was introduced in the Broadway musical Swingin' the Dream, a variation on A Midsummer Night's Dream by William Shakespeare set in New Orleans in 1890. The musical opened at Center Theatre in November 1939 and closed after 13 performances.

== Other versions ==
- Chet Baker – Chet Baker Big Band (1956).
- Tony Bennett – for his album Cloud 7 (1955).
- Jane Ira Bloom – Sixteen Sunsets (2013).
- Petula Clark – Petula Clark in Hollywood (1959).
- Miles Davis – Birth of the Cool (1950)
- Doris Day – a single release for Columbia Records (catalog No. 38887) in 1950.
- Michael Feinstein – Romance on Film, Romance on Broadway (2000).
- Ella Fitzgerald – Ella Swings Gently with Nelson (1961).
- Dexter Gordon – Daddy Plays the Horn (1955)
- Lars Gullin – Lars Gullin Quartet (1960).
- Billie Holiday – Body and Soul (1957).
- Lena Horne – Lena on the Blue Side (1962).
- Ahmad Jamal – Ahmad Jamal Plays (1955) rereleased as Chamber Music of the New Jazz (1956)
- Stan Kenton – Sophisticated Approach (1961)
- Tina May – Fun (1993)
- Thelonious Monk – The Unique Thelonious Monk (1956).
- Patti Page – You Go to My Head (1956).
- Dianne Reeves - A Little Moonlight - (2003)
- Maxine Sullivan – Close as Pages in a Book (1970).
- Sarah Vaughan – No Count Sarah (1959).
- Dinah Washington – Dinah Jams (1954).
- Nancy Wilson – But Beautiful (1971).
- Clifford Brown & Max Roach – Brown and Roach Incorporated (1955).

== See also ==
- List of 1930s jazz standards
