= Study in Brown =

Studio album by Clifford Brown and Max Roach
- Released: 1955
- Recorded: February 23–25, 1955
- Studio: Capitol Studios, New York City
- Genre: Hard bop Bebop
- Length: 39:53
- Label: EmArcy; MG 36037

Clifford Brown and Max Roach chronology
Brown and Roach Incorporated (1954)	Study in Brown (1955)	Clifford Brown & Max Roach (1954-55)

Professional ratings
Review scores
Source	Rating
AllMusic	4/5 stars
Disc	4.5/5 stars
The Penguin Guide to Jazz Recordings	3/4 stars

Study in Brown (EmArcy Records, 1955) is a Clifford Brown and Max Roach album. The album consists predominantly of originals by members of the band. The songs "Lands End", by tenor saxophonist Harold Land, and "Sandu", by Brown, have gone on to become jazz standards. The song "George's Dilemma" is also known as "Ulcer Department". Brown's solo on "Cherokee" is among the most acclaimed solos in jazz.

== Track listing ==
1. "Cherokee" (Ray Noble) – 5:44
2. "Jacqui" (Richie Powell) – 5:11
3. "Swingin'" (Clifford Brown) – 2:52
4. "Lands End" (Harold Land) – 4:57
5. "George's Dilemma" (Brown) – 5:36
6. "Sandu" (Brown) – 4:57
7. "Gerkin for Perkin" (Brown) – 2:56
8. "If I Love Again" (Jack Murray and Ben Oakland) – 3:24
9. "Take the "A" Train" (Billy Strayhorn) – 4:16

== Personnel ==
- Clifford Brown – trumpet
- Harold Land – tenor saxophone
- Richie Powell – piano
- George Morrow – double bass
- Max Roach – drums
