= Joy Spring =

1954 jazz standard by Clifford Brown

Song by Clifford Brown and Max Roach

from the album Clifford Brown & Max Roach
- Released: December 1954
- Recorded: August 1954
- Studio: Capitol, Los Angeles
- Genre: Jazz
- Length: 6:52
- Composer: Clifford Brown
- Lyricist: Jon Hendricks

"Joy Spring" is a 1954 jazz composition by Clifford Brown that became his signature work. The title was his pet name for his wife Larue.

== Early history ==
Brown first recorded "Joy Spring" in a studio session he led on August 6, 1954, at Capitol Recording Studios, in Los Angeles; with him on the session were Harold Land (tenor saxophone), Richie Powell (piano), George Morrow (bass), and Max Roach (drums). They made two takes: 10877-3 and 10877-4.

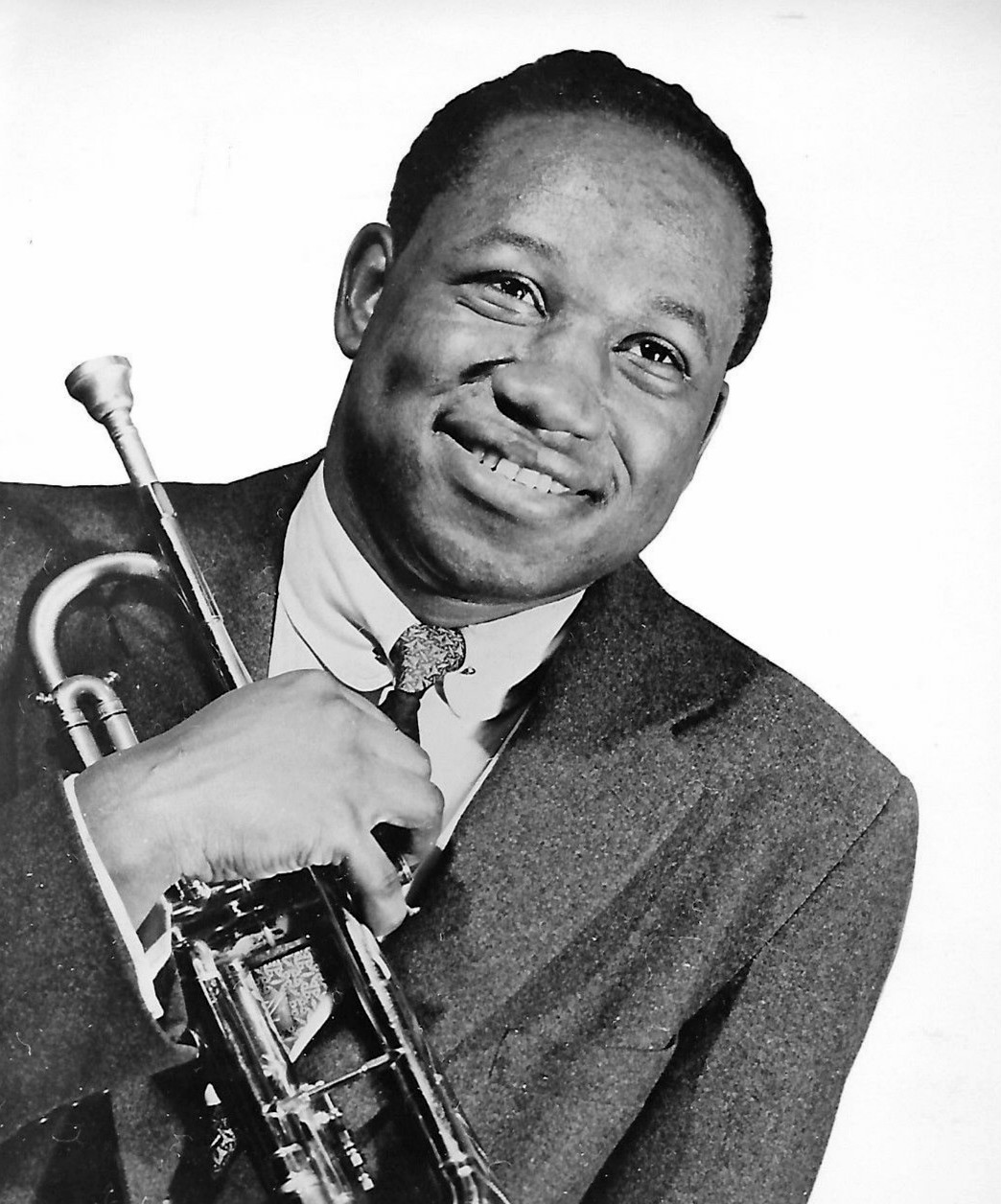
Clifford Brown in 1956

Six days later (August 12, 1954), at the same studio, Brown, as leader, recorded Jack Montrose's arrangement of the song, with Stu Williamson (valve trombone), Zoot Sims (tenor saxophone), Bob Gordon (baritone sax), Russ Freeman (piano), Joe Mondragon (bass), and Shelly Manne (drums). This take was issued on several albums, including Jazz Messages (Jazztone J-1281), Clifford Brown & Max Roach (Pacific Jazz CDP 7 46850 2), and Jazz Immortal – Featuring Zoot Sims (1988; Pacific Jazz CDP 7 46850 2).

Larue Anderson, before marrying Brown, had been a classical music student at the University of Southern California. Without any knowledge of jazz theory – and, in particular, without any knowledge of bebop articulations, phrasing, and the use of half-step progressions, tritone substitutions, and other musical features of the style – she had begun writing a thesis titled "Classics versus Jazz". Max Roach, a friend who introduced her to Brown, took her aside and said, "Honey, the whole world is not built around tonic / dominant." He convinced her to the point that she became a jazz devotee.

== Covers ==
In 1985, Jon Hendricks wrote lyrics to Brown's music, and the song was performed and published by Manhattan Transfer on their album Vocalese with the title "Sing Joy Spring".

- 1955: Jack Montrose on the studio album Arranged by Montrose
- 1957: Oscar Peterson trio with Ray Brown and Herb Ellis, At the Opera House
- 1958: Lem Winchester and Ramsey Lewis on the album Lem Winchester and the Ramsey Lewis Trio
- 1960: George Shearing with his quintet on the live album On the Sunny Side of the Strip
- 1961: Gary Burton on his debut album, New Vibe Man in Town
- 1964: Joe Pass live version on the album Joy Spring
- 1981: Stan Getz with his quartet on the album The Dolphin
- 1982: Freddie Hubbard on the album Born to Be Blue
- 1985: Larry Coryell and Emily Remler on the album Together
- 1989: McCoy Tyner on the album Things Ain't What They Used to Be
- 1992: Arturo Sandoval in the tribute album I Remember Clifford with Ed Calle, and again in 2003 on the album Trumpet Evolution
- 1993: Doug Sert on the album Joy Spring
- 1994: Helen Merrill on the tribute album Brownie: Homage to Clifford Brown
- 1995: Tito Puente on his album Tito's Idea
- 1996: Karrin Allyson on the album Collage
- 1998: Billy Taylor on the album Ten Fingers, One Voice
- 2003: Larry Coryell on his album Joy Spring (The Swinging Side Of Larry Coryell)
- 2007: Buddy Rich on his posthumous release Time Out
- 2012: Paolo Fresu with Marco Tamburini, Fabrizio Bosso, Flavio Boltro, and Franco Ambrosetti on the album 50 anni suonati

== Filmography ==
1988: Let's Get Lost – "Joy Spring"
1999: Guinevere – "Joy Spring"
