= Sonny Boy (album) =

1961 album by Sonny Rollins

Studio album by Sonny Rollins
- Released: 1961
- Recorded: October 5 and December 7, 1956
- Studio: Van Gelder Studio, Hackensack, New Jersey
- Genre: Jazz
- Length: 39:01
- Label: Prestige
- Producer: Bob Weinstock

Sonny Rollins chronology
Tour de Force (1956)	Sonny Boy (1961)	Sonny Rollins, Volume 1 (1957)

Sonny Boy is a 1961 album by jazz saxophonist Sonny Rollins comprising four tracks from his final recordings for the Prestige label, three of which were originally released on Tour de Force, along with an unissued performance from the session that produced Rollins Plays for Bird.

== Reception ==
Professional ratings
Review scores
Source	Rating
AllMusic	3/5 stars
DownBeat	4/5 stars
The Rolling Stone Album Guide	3.5/5 stars

AllMusic critic Scott Yanow states: "Tour de Force is a more logical purchase, although the music on this CD does feature the immortal tenor saxophonist in fine form."

== Track listing ==
All compositions by Sonny Rollins except where noted.

1. "Ee-Ah" – 6:52
2. "B. Quick" – 9:13
3. "B. Swift" – 5:15
4. "The House I Live In" (Lewis Allan, Earl Robinson) – 9:21
5. "Sonny Boy" (Lew Brown, Buddy DeSylva, Ray Henderson, Al Jolson) – 8:22

== Personnel ==
- Sonny Rollins – tenor saxophone
- Kenny Dorham – trumpet (backgrounds track 4)
- Kenny Drew (tracks 1–3, 5) – piano
- Wade Legge (track 4) – piano
- George Morrow – bass
- Max Roach – drums
- Recorded at Van Gelder Studio in Hackensack, New Jersey, on October 5 (track 4) and December 7 (tracks 1–3, 5), 1956
