= Jazz in 3/4 Time =

Jazz in ¾ Time

Studio album by Max Roach
- Released: 1957
- Recorded: September 17, 19, 20, 1956 (Track 7) & March 18, 20, 21, 1957 (Tracks 1–6); New York City and Capitol Tower Studios, Hollywood, California
- Genre: Jazz
- Length: 50:03
- Label: EmArcy; MG 36108
- Producer: Bob Shad

Max Roach chronology
Max Roach + 4 (1956)	Jazz in ¾ Time (1957)	The Max Roach 4 Plays Charlie Parker (1957)

Jazz in ¾ Time is an album by American jazz drummer Max Roach featuring tracks recorded in late 1956 and early 1957 and released on the EmArcy label.

== Reception ==
Professional ratings
Review scores
Source	Rating
Allmusic	4/5 stars
Disc	4/5 stars
The Rolling Stone Jazz Record Guide	3/5 stars
The Penguin Guide to Jazz Recordings	3.5/4 stars
Tom Hull	B+

Allmusic awarded the album 4 stars and its review by Scott Yanow states, "These excellent performances show that jazz does not always have to be in 4/4 time in order to swing".

== Track listing ==
All compositions by Max Roach except as indicated

1. "Blues Waltz" – 6:31
2. "Valse Hot" (Sonny Rollins) – 14:21
3. "I'll Take Romance" (Oscar Hammerstein II, Ben Oakland) – 4:31
4. "Little Folks" – 5:36
5. "Lover" [mono take] (Lorenz Hart, Richard Rodgers) – 5:35
6. "Lover" [stereo take] (Hart, Rodgers) – 5:35
7. "The Most Beautiful Girl in the World" (Hart, Rodgers) – 7:05
- Recorded in New York City on September 19, 1956 (track 7) and at Capitol Tower Studios in Hollywood, California on March 18 (tracks 1 & 3), March 20 (tracks 2 & 4) & March 21 (tracks 5 & 6), 1957

== Personnel ==
- Max Roach – drums
- Kenny Dorham – trumpet
- Sonny Rollins – tenor saxophone
- Ray Bryant (track 7), Bill Wallace (tracks 1–6) – piano
- George Morrow – bass
