= Somethin' Else (Cannonball Adderley album) =

1958 studio album by Cannonball Adderley

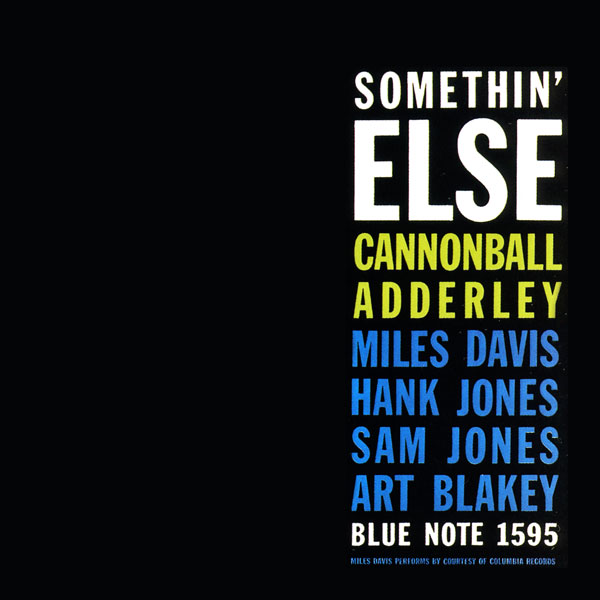

Studio album by Cannonball Adderley
- Released: August 1958
- Recorded: March 9, 1958
- Studios: Van Gelder Studio; Hackensack, NJ
- Genres: Jazz, hard bop, bebop
- Length: 38:44
- Labels: Blue Note; BLP 1595
- Producer: Alfred Lion

Cannonball Adderley chronology
Cannonball's Sharpshooters (1958)	Somethin' Else (1958)	Portrait of Cannonball (1958)

Somethin' Else is an album by American jazz saxophonist Julian "Cannonball" Adderley, recorded on March 9, 1958 and released on Blue Note in August later that year—his only album for the label. Also on the session is trumpeter Miles Davis in one of his handful of recording dates for Blue Note. Adderley was a member of Davis' group at the time, and the album was recorded shortly after Davis' own landmark album Milestones.

== Background ==
The album was recorded during Adderley's membership in the Miles Davis' First Great Quintet, and it also marks one of the few recordings Davis made as a sideman after 1955. Indeed, Davis plays several of the first solos, composed the bluesy title track and, according to the liner notes, chose most of the material. "Autumn Leaves" would remain in the Davis book, and "Love for Sale" would be recorded by the Davis Sextet a little over two months later. Miles, as quoted in the original liner notes, recounted: "All my inspiration today comes from Ahmad Jamal, the Chicago pianist. I got the idea for this treatment of 'Autumn Leaves' from him."

The twelve-bar blues "One for Daddy-O" was written by Adderley's brother Nat for Chicago radio DJ Holmes "Daddy-O" Daylie. At the end of that track, Davis can be heard addressing producer Alfred Lion, saying: "Is that what you wanted, Alfred?"

=== "Bangoon" ===
In the 1980s, the album was re-issued with a bonus track from the recording session that was listed as "Alison's Uncle" and credited to Cannonball Adderley. The track appeared as "Alison's Uncle" on compact disc releases in the U.S. and Japan in 1986, and it continued to appear under this title, or as "Bangoon (aka Alison's Uncle)", on reissues into the 21st century. The composition is actually Hank Jones' "Bangoon", and first appeared on Gigi Gryce's 1957 Jubilee Records album Jazz Lab, with Jones playing piano. (Gryce also recorded a second version of the tune with Jones on his Gigi Gryce album.) The title "Alison's Uncle" was created by Nat Adderley in the 1980s when he was asked by reissue producers to name a track that they could not identify. Nat Adderley's alternate title refers to the session having taken place shortly after his daughter Alison had been born.

== Reception ==
Professional ratings
Review scores
Source	Rating
AllMusic	5/5 stars
The Encyclopedia of Popular Music	5/5 stars
Tom Hull	A−
Jazzwise	5/5 stars
The Penguin Guide to Jazz	4/4 stars
DownBeat	5/5 stars

The Penguin Guide to Jazz selected Somethin' Else as part of its suggested "Core Collection".

Dom Cerulli gave the album 5 stars in the original DownBeat review in 1958, singling out Miles Davis' lyricism on "Autumn Leaves". Orrin Keepnews gave the reissue a 4-star rating in 1974. He wrote: "For a look at two giants at an earlier stage of their careers — Cannonball as he was just reaching his first bloom, Miles in full middle-period flower — and a sample of the laid-back sounds of a just-barely-bygone day, Somethin' Else's something worth hearing." Keepnews lamented that "Blakey never gets a chance to shift into high gear, and that pianist Jones' elegant lyricism, most clearly evident on the intro to Love, isn't displayed in a ballad setting".

== Track listing ==
=== Original release ===
Side 1
No.	Title	Writer(s)	Length
1.	"Autumn Leaves"	Joseph Kosma, Johnny Mercer, Jacques Prévert	10:55
2.	"Love for Sale"	Cole Porter	7:01

Side 2
No.	Title	Writer(s)	Length
1.	"Somethin' Else"	Miles Davis	8:15
2.	"One for Daddy-O"	Nat Adderley	8:26
3.	"Dancing in the Dark"	Arthur Schwartz, Howard Dietz	4:07

=== CD reissues ===
No.	Title	Writer(s)	Length
1.	"Autumn Leaves"	Joseph Kosma, Johnny Mercer, Jacques Prévert	10:55
2.	"Love for Sale"	Cole Porter	7:01
3.	"Somethin' Else"	Miles Davis	8:15
4.	"One for Daddy-O"	Nat Adderley	8:26
5.	"Dancing in the Dark"	Arthur Schwartz, Howard Dietz	4:07
6.	"Bangoon" (aka "Alison's Uncle")	Hank Jones	5:05
7.	"Autumn Leaves" (Alternate Take; 2013 Blue Note SHM-CD Japan bonus track)	Joseph Kosma, Johnny Mercer, Jacques Prévert	9:33

== Personnel ==
=== Musicians ===
- Cannonball Adderley – alto saxophone
- Miles Davis – trumpet
- Hank Jones – piano
- Sam Jones – bass
- Art Blakey – drums

=== Technical personnel ===
- Alfred Lion – producer
- Rudy Van Gelder – recording engineer
- Reid Miles – design
- Frank Wolff – photography
- Leonard Feather – liner notes
