= After Hours with Miss "D" =

Studio album by Dinah Washington
- Released: 1954
- Recorded: June 17, 1953, February 5, June 15, 1954
- Genre: Jazz
- Length: 54:41
- Label: EmArcy, Verve (reissue)

Dinah Washington chronology
Blazing Ballads (1952)	After Hours with Miss "D" (1954)	Dinah Jams (1955)

Professional ratings
Review scores
Source	Rating
AllMusic	4.5/5 stars
The Penguin Guide to Jazz Recordings	3.5/4 stars

After Hours with Miss "D" is a 1954 studio album by Dinah Washington. The 2004 CD reissue included an extended take of "Blue Skies".

== Track listing ==
1. "Blue Skies" (Irving Berlin) – 7:52
2. "Bye Bye Blues" (David Bennett, Chauncey Gray, Frederick Hamm, Bert Lown) – 6:58
3. "Am I Blue?" (Harry Akst, Grant Clarke) – 3:14
4. "Our Love Is Here to Stay" (George Gershwin, Ira Gershwin) – 2:31
5. "A Foggy Day" (G. Gershwin, I. Gershwin) – 7:59
6. "I Let a Song Go Out of My Heart" (Duke Ellington, Irving Mills, Henry Nemo) – 7:02
7. "Pennies from Heaven" (Arthur Johnston, Johnny Burke) – 2:17
8. "Love for Sale" (Cole Porter) – 2:12
9. "Blue Skies" – 10:54

== Personnel ==
- Dinah Washington – vocals
- Clark Terry – Trumpet
- Gus Chappell – Trombone
- Rick Henderson – Alto saxophone
- Eddie Chamblee – Tenor saxophone
- Eddie "Lockjaw" Davis – Tenor saxophone
- Paul Quinichette – Tenor saxophone
- Clarence "Sleepy" Anderson – Piano
- Junior Mance – Piano
- Jackie Davis – Organ
- Keter Betts – Bass
- Candido Camero – Congas
- Ed Thigpen – Drums
