= Sophisticated Swing =

Studio album by Cannonball Adderley
- Released: 1957
- Recorded: February 6, 8 & 11, 1957
- Studio: Capitol (New York City)
- Genre: Jazz
- Label: EmArcy

Cannonball Adderley chronology
In the Land of Hi-Fi with Julian Cannonball Adderley (1956)	Sophisticated Swing (1957)	Cannonball Enroute (1957)

Professional ratings
Review scores
Source	Rating
Allmusic	3/5 stars

Sophisticated Swing is the fifth album by jazz saxophonist Cannonball Adderley, and his fourth released on the EmArcy label, featuring performances with Nat Adderley, Junior Mance, Sam Jones and Jimmy Cobb. The front cover photograph was by Chuck Stewart taken at the Ulysses S. Grant Monument, Chicago, Illinois.

== Reception ==
The Allmusic review by Scott Yanow awarded the album 3 stars and states "The music is quite bop-oriented, bluesy but not as soulful as it would be when Cannonball put together a new group in 1959".

== Track listing ==
1. "Another Kind of Soul" (Nat Adderley) - 3:41
2. "Miss Jackie's Delight" (Gene Wright) - 6:13
3. "Spring Is Here" (Lorenz Hart, Richard Rodgers) - 3:47
4. "Tribute to Brownie" (Duke Pearson) - 3:32
5. "Spectacular" (Sam Jones) - 3:56
6. "Jeanie" (Jones) - 3:28
7. "Stella by Starlight" (Victor Young) - 3:17
8. "Edie McLin" (Wright) - 5:21
9. "Cobbweb" (Wright) - 2:41

- Recorded at Capitol Studios in New York City on February 6 (tracks 2, 4-5 & 9), February 8 (track 6) and February 11 (tracks 1, 3, 7 & 8), 1957

== Personnel ==
- Cannonball Adderley - alto saxophone
- Nat Adderley – cornet
- Junior Mance - piano
- Sam Jones - bass
- Jimmy Cobb - drums
