= Moon and Sand (Jacky Terrasson and Tom Harrell album) =

Studio album by Jacky Terrasson & Tom Harrell
- Released: 1991
- Recorded: 5–6 December 1991
- Studios: Capbreton, France
- Genre: Jazz
- Length: 66:37
- Label: Jazz Aux Remparts JAR 64007
- Producer: Jacky Terrasson

Jacky Terrasson chronology
Moon and Sand (1991)	Lover Man (1994)

Moon and Sand is a studio album by German jazz pianist Jacky Terrasson and American jazz trumpeter Tom Harrell. The album was recorded in Paris and released in 1991 by Jazz Aux Remparts label. This is a debut full-size release for Terrasson. The album was re-released in 1996 and 2001. The album is a collection of jazz standards with one composition written by Harrell.

== Reception ==
Michel Laverdure of Jazz Magazine stated, "Tom Harrell and Jacky Terrasson in a day of grace!" Le Monde review by Francis Marmande commented, "The music, in short, that I have never stopped loving. Record of the year, certainly, and many years to come. Believe me..."

Professional ratings
Review scores
Source	Rating
The Penguin Guide to Jazz Recordings	3/4 stars

== Track listing ==
No.	Title	Writer(s)	Length
1.	"Moon and Sand"	Alec Wilder	4:12
2.	"Tune Up"	Miles Davis	5:46
3.	"Beautiful Love"	Wayne King, Victor Young	5:30
4.	"If You Could See Me Now"	Tadd Dameron, Carl Sigman	7:22
5.	"20 Bars Tune"	Harrell	5:16
6.	"What Kind of Fool Am I?"	Leslie Bricusse, Anthony Newley	4:12
7.	"Parisian Thoroughfare"	Bud Powell	5:31
8.	"Janine"	Duke Pearson	6:36
9.	"Just Around Midnight"	Thelonious Monk, Cootie Williams	7:06
10.	"Rhythm-A-Ning"	Thelonious Monk	5:59
11.	"Con Alma"	Dizzy Gillespie	8:05
Total length:			66:37

The is also the final title "Well, You Needn't" by Thelonious Monk.

== Personnel ==
- Jacky Terrasson – piano
- Tom Harrell – trumpet, flugelhorn
