= The Max Roach 4 Plays Charlie Parker =

Studio album by Max Roach
- Released: 1959
- Recorded: December 23, 1957 and April 11, 1958; New York City
- Genre: Jazz
- Length: 56:36
- Label: EmArcy; MG 36127

Max Roach chronology
| Jazz in ¾ Time (1957) | The Max Roach 4 Plays Charlie Parker (1959) | MAX (1958) |

The Max Roach 4 Plays Charlie Parker is an album by American jazz drummer Max Roach featuring tracks associated with Charlie Parker recorded in late 1957 and 1958 and released on the EmArcy label. It is also the first album to feature Roach playing without a piano.

== Reception ==
Professional ratings
Review scores
| Source | Rating |
|---|---|
| Allmusic | 4/5 stars |
| The Rolling Stone Jazz Record Guide | 4/5 stars |
| Tom Hull | B+ |

Allmusic awarded the album 4 stars stating "this set is generally fine although the lack of a piano is really felt on some of this material".

== Track listing ==
All compositions by Charlie Parker except as indicated

1. "Yardbird Suite" - 3:55
2. "Confirmation" - 4:28
3. "Ko-Ko" - 7:59
4. "Billie's Bounce" - 5:37
5. "Au Privave" - 4:19
6. "Parker's Mood" - 8:23
7. "Raoul" (Max Roach) - 4:50 Bonus track on CD reissue
8. "This Time the Dream's on Me" (Harold Arlen, Johnny Mercer) - 5:21 Bonus track on CD reissue
9. "Tune-Up" (Eddie "Cleanhead" Vinson) - 7:46 Bonus track on CD reissue
10. "Anthropology (Thriving on a Riff)" (Dizzy Gillespie, Parker) - 5:06 Bonus track on CD reissue
- Recorded at Fine Recording in New York City on December 20, 1957 (tracks 7–9), December 23, 1957 (tracks 1, 2, 5 & 10) and at Nola's Penthouse Sound Studios in New York City on April 11, 1958 (tracks 3, 4 & 6)

== Personnel ==
- Max Roach - drums
- Kenny Dorham - trumpet
- George Coleman (tracks 3, 4 & 6), Hank Mobley (tracks 1, 2, 5 & 7–10) - tenor saxophone
- Nelson Boyd (tracks 3, 4 & 6), George Morrow (tracks 1, 2, 5 & 7–10) - bass
