= Saxophone Colossus =

1957 studio album by Sonny Rollins

Studio album by Sonny Rollins
- Released: March/April 1957
- Recorded: June 22, 1956
- Studio: Van Gelder Studio, Hackensack, New Jersey
- Genre: Hard bop
- Length: 39:58
- Label: Prestige
- Producer: Bob Weinstock

Sonny Rollins chronology
Tenor Madness (1956)	Saxophone Colossus (1957)	Rollins Plays for Bird (1956)

Saxophone Colossus is the sixth studio album by American jazz saxophonist Sonny Rollins. Perhaps Rollins's best-known album, it is often considered his breakthrough record. It was recorded monophonically on June 22, 1956, with producer Bob Weinstock and engineer Rudy Van Gelder at the latter's studio in Hackensack, New Jersey. Rollins led a quartet on the album that included pianist Tommy Flanagan, bassist Doug Watkins, and drummer Max Roach. Rollins was a member of the Clifford Brown/Max Roach Quintet at the time of the recording, and the recording took place four days before his bandmates Brown and Richie Powell died in a car accident on the way to a band engagement in Chicago. (Rollins was not travelling in the car carrying Brown and Powell.) Roach appeared on several more of Rollins' solo albums, up to the 1958 Freedom Suite album.

Saxophone Colossus was released by Prestige Records to critical success and helped establish Rollins as a prominent jazz artist.

In 2016, Saxophone Colossus was selected for preservation in the National Recording Registry by the Library of Congress as being "culturally, historically, or aesthetically significant".

== Release and legacy ==
Professional ratings
Review scores
Source	Rating
AllMusic	5/5 stars
Disc	5/5 stars
DownBeat	5/5 stars
Encyclopedia of Popular Music	5/5 stars
Jazzwise	5/5 stars
MusicHound Jazz	5/5
The Penguin Guide to Jazz	👑
Record Mirror	3/5 stars
The Rolling Stone Album Guide	4/5 stars
The Rolling Stone Jazz Record Guide	5/5 stars

Independent sources have differed in their reporting of the album's release date. According to The Mojo Collection, it was released in the autumn of 1956, while an August 1957 issue of Billboard magazine listed the album among records released in the period between March 16 and July of that same year. Reviewing in April 1957, Billboard said "Rollins' latest effort should really start musicians buzzing", as "the tenorman is one of the most vigorous, dynamic and inventive of modern jazzmen", and "everytrack is packed with surprises, tho Rollins develops each solo with great architectural logic". Ralph J. Gleason reviewed the album later in June for DownBeat, writing:

Almost as if in answer to the charge that there is a lack of grace and beauty in the work of the New York hard-swingers comes this album in which Rollins displays humor, gentleness, a delicate feeling for beauty in line, and a puckish sense of humor. And all done with the uncompromising swinging that has characterized them all along.

Scott Yanow, in a retrospective review for AllMusic, called Saxophone Colossus "arguably his finest all-around set", while German musicologist Peter Niklas Wilson deemed it "another milestone of the Rollins discography, a recording repeatedly cited as Rollins' chef d'oeuvre, and one of the classic jazz albums of all time". In 2000, it was voted number 405 in Colin Larkin's All Time Top 1000 Albums. The Penguin Guide to Jazz included the album in its suggested "core collection" of essential recordings, and in addition to its maximum rating of four stars awarded it a "crown", indicating an album for which the authors felt particular admiration or affection.

== Track listing ==
=== Side one ===
No.	Title	Writer(s)	Length
1.	"St. Thomas"	Sonny Rollins	6:49
2.	"You Don't Know What Love Is"	Gene de Paul, Don Raye	6:30
3.	"Strode Rode"	Sonny Rollins	5:17

=== Side two ===
No.	Title	Writer(s)	Length
1.	"Moritat"	Kurt Weill, Bertolt Brecht	10:05
2.	"Blue 7"	Sonny Rollins	11:17

== Personnel ==
- Sonny Rollins – tenor saxophone
- Tommy Flanagan – piano
- Doug Watkins – bass
- Max Roach – drums

== Charts ==
Chart performance for Saxophone Colossus
Chart (2026)	Peak position
US Top Jazz Albums (Billboard)	23
