= Julian Cannonball Adderley and Strings =

Studio album by Cannonball Adderley
- Released: 1955
- Recorded: October 27 & 28, 1955
- Genre: Jazz
- Label: EmArcy

Cannonball Adderley chronology
Julian "Cannonball" Adderley (1955)	Julian Cannonball Adderley and Strings (1955)	In the Land of Hi-Fi with Julian Cannonball Adderley (1956)

Professional ratings
Review scores
Source	Rating
Allmusic	(not rated)
The Rolling Stone Jazz Record Guide	1/5 stars

Julian Cannonball Adderley and Strings is the third album by jazz saxophonist Cannonball Adderley, and his second released on the EmArcy label, and features Adderley with an orchestra directed by Richard Hayman.

== Reception ==
The Allmusic review by Stewart Mason states "Adderley himself plays beautifully, showing off his typically excellent soloing throughout... barring a few minor missteps, all of Julian Cannonball Adderley and Strings is well worth hearing".

== Track listing ==
1. "I Cover the Waterfront" (Johnny Green, Edward Heyman) - 2:27
2. "A Foggy Day" (George Gershwin, Ira Gershwin) - 2:42
3. "The Surrey With the Fringe on Top" (Oscar Hammerstein II, Richard Rodgers) - 2:33
4. "Two Sleepy People" (Hoagy Carmichael, Frank Loesser) - 3:01
5. "I'll Never Stop Loving You" (Nicholas Brodszky, Sammy Cahn) - 2:41
6. "(I'm Afraid) The Masquerade Is Over" (Herbert Magidson, Allie Wrubel) - 3:11
7. "I've Never Been in Love Before" (Loesser) - 2:20
8. "Lonely Dreams" (Julius Gubenko) - 2:30
9. "Falling in Love With Love" (Lorenz Hart, Richard Rodgers) - 2:33
10. "Street of Dreams" (Sam M. Lewis, Victor Young) - 2:14
11. "Polka Dots and Moonbeams" (Johnny Burke, Jimmy Van Heusen) - 3:04
12. "You Are Too Beautiful" (Hart, Rodgers) - 2:55

- Recorded in New York City on October 27 (tracks 9–12) & October 28 (tracks 1–8), 1955

== Personnel ==
- Cannonball Adderley – alto saxophone
- Richard Hayman – musical director
- Bill Russo – arranger
- Unidentified strings
