= Cannonball's Sharpshooters =

Studio album by Cannonball Adderley
- Released: 1958
- Recorded: March 4, & 6, 1958
- Studio: Bell Sound (New York City)
- Genre: Jazz
- Length: 37:19 (original LP)
- Labels: EmArcy; MG 36135

Cannonball Adderley chronology
Cannonball Enroute (1957)	Cannonball's Sharpshooters (1958)	Somethin' Else (1958)

Professional ratings
Review scores
Source	Rating
Allmusic	4/5 stars

Cannonball's Sharpshooters is the seventh album by jazz saxophonist Cannonball Adderley, and his second released on the EmArcy label, featuring performances with Nat Adderley, Junior Mance, Sam Jones, and Jimmy Cobb.

== Reception ==
The Allmusic review by Scott Yanow awarded the album 4 stars and states "Excellent bebop comes from the great altoist Cannonball Adderley and his original quintet".

== Track listing ==
1. "Our Delight" (Tadd Dameron) - 4:38
2. "What's New?" (Johnny Burke, Bob Haggart) - 5:02
3. "Fuller Bop Man" (Gil Fuller) - 3:43
4. "Jubilation" (Julian "Cannonball" Adderley) - 5:25
5. "Stay on It" (Dameron) - 4:38
6. "If I Love Again" (Oscar Hammerstein II, Richard Rodgers) - 5:27
7. "Straight, No Chaser" (Thelonious Monk) - 8:26
8. "Fuller Bop Man" [alternate take] (Gil Fuller) - 8:59 Bonus track on CD reissue
  - Recorded at Bell Sound Studios in New York City on March 4 (tracks 1–2, 4 & 7) and March 6 (tracks 3, 5–6 & 8), 1958

== Personnel ==
- Cannonball Adderley - alto saxophone
- Nat Adderley – cornet
- Junior Mance - piano
- Sam Jones - bass
- Jimmy Cobb - drums
