= Max (Max Roach album) =

MAX

Studio album by Max Roach Quintet
- Released: 1958
- Recorded: January 14th, 1958; Chicago
- Genre: Jazz
- Length: 32:39
- Label: Argo; LP 623

Max Roach chronology
| The Max Roach 4 Plays Charlie Parker (1957) | MAX (1958) | Max Roach + 4 on the Chicago Scene (1958) |

MAX is an album by American jazz drummer Max Roach featuring tracks recorded in 1958 and released on the Argo label.

== Reception ==
Professional ratings
Review scores
| Source | Rating |
|---|---|
| Allmusic | 3.5/5 stars |
| The Penguin Guide to Jazz Recordings | 3/4 stars |

The Allmusic review states, "1958's MAX shows Max Roach at the top of his game. A decade earlier, Roach had absorbed Kenny Clarke's drumming style and, with trumpet virtuoso Clifford Brown, forged his own brand of bebop. By 1958, on his way to becoming a true jazz elder, Roach began pushing the boundaries of jazz even further".

== Track listing ==
All compositions by Max Roach except as indicated

1. "Crackle Hut" (Owen Marshall) - 5:47
2. "Speculate" (Kenny Dorham) - 4:59
3. "That Ole Devil Love" (Doris Fisher, Allan Roberts) - 6:26
4. "Audio Blues" - 6:29
5. "C.M." (Hank Mobley) - 5:01
6. "Four-X" - 3:57

== Personnel ==
- Max Roach - drums
- Kenny Dorham - trumpet
- Hank Mobley - tenor saxophone
- Ramsey Lewis - piano
- George Morrow - bass
