= Work Time =

1956 studio album by Sonny Rollins

Studio album by Sonny Rollins
- Released: 1956
- Recorded: December 2, 1955
- Studio: Van Gelder Studio, Hackensack, New Jersey
- Genre: Jazz
- Length: 32:58
- Label: Prestige
- Producer: Bob Weinstock

Sonny Rollins chronology
Moving Out (1954)	Work Time (1956)	Sonny Rollins Plus 4 (1956)

Work Time is a 1956 album by jazz saxophonist Sonny Rollins, recorded for the Prestige label, featuring performances by Rollins with Ray Bryant, George Morrow, and Max Roach.

== Reception ==
The AllMusic review by Scott Yanow states: "The enjoyable outing may not be essential, but it is a strong effort."

Author and musician Peter Niklas Wilson called the album "one of Rollins's most brilliant sessions. In the opinion of many of the saxophone player's fans it is the equal of the epochal Saxophone Colossus recordings."

Professional ratings
Review scores
Source	Rating
AllMusic	3.5/5 stars
Disc	4.5/5 stars
The Rolling Stone Jazz Record Guide	5/5 stars
The Penguin Guide to Jazz Recordings	3.5/4 stars

== Track listing ==
1. "There's No Business Like Show Business" (Irving Berlin) – 6:20
2. "Paradox" (Sonny Rollins) – 5:00
3. "Raincheck" (Billy Strayhorn) – 6:00
4. "There Are Such Things" (Stanley Adams, Abel Baer, George W. Meyer) – 9:32
5. "It's All Right with Me" (Cole Porter) – 6:06

== Personnel ==
- Sonny Rollins – tenor saxophone
- Ray Bryant – piano
- George Morrow – bass
- Max Roach – drums
