= Dinah Jams =

Live album by Dinah Washington
- Released: February 1955
- Recorded: August 15, 1954
- Genre: Jazz
- Length: 53:05
- Label: EmArcy
- Producer: Bob Shad

Dinah Washington chronology
After Hours with Miss "D" (1954)	Dinah Jams (1955)	For Those in Love (1955)

Professional ratings
Review scores
Source	Rating
AllMusic	5/5 stars
The Encyclopedia of Popular Music	5/5 stars
The Penguin Guide to Jazz Recordings	3.5/4 stars

Dinah Jams is the second studio album by vocalist Dinah Washington. It was recorded live in Los Angeles in 1954. Billboard in 1955 wrote: "The instrumental solos are excellent and the entire package is well recorded in a smoothly paced collection of hot and cool jazz."

== Track listing ==
Side one
No.	Title	Length
1.	"Lover, Come Back to Me" (Oscar Hammerstein II and Sigmund Romberg)	9:46
2.	"Alone Together" (Arthur Schwartz)	2:23
3.	"Summertime" (George Gershwin)	2:27
4.	"Come Rain or Come Shine" (Harold Arlen and Johnny Mercer)	2:22
5.	"No More" (Tutti Camarata and Bob Russell)	3:17

Side two
No.	Title	Length
6.	"I've Got You Under My Skin" (Cole Porter)	5:18
7.	"There Is No Greater Love" (Isham Jones and Marty Symes)	2:17
8.	"You Go to My Head" (John Frederick Coots and Haven Gillespie)	11:07

Reissue bonus tracks
No.	Title	Length
9.	"Darn That Dream" (Jimmy Van Heusen and Eddie DeLange)	5:14
10.	"Crazy He Calls Me" (Carl Sigman and Bob Russell)	4:47
11.	"I'll Remember April" (Gene de Paul, Patricia Johnston and Don Raye)	11:47

Tracks 2 and 3 are instrumentals.

== Personnel ==
- Dinah Washington - vocals
- Clifford Brown - trumpet
- Maynard Ferguson - trumpet
- Clark Terry - trumpet
- Herb Geller - alto saxophone
- Harold Land - tenor saxophone
- Richie Powell - piano
- Junior Mance - piano
- George Morrow - double bass
- Keter Betts - double bass
- Max Roach - drums
