= You Are Too Beautiful =

1932 song

You Are Too Beautiful is a 1932 song written by Richard Rodgers and Lorenz Hart for the 1933 film Hallelujah, I'm a Bum, where it was sung by Al Jolson. It became a pop and jazz standard in the 1940s, with a notable recording made on August 3, 1945 by Dick Haymes (Decca 23750).

== Other recordings ==
Other versions include those by:

- Frank Sinatra (1945)
- Bing Crosby (1953), found on compilation albums, among others Through the Years, Vol. 6: 1953–1954
- Cannonball Adderley on Julian Cannonball Adderley and Strings (1955)
- Thelonious Monk on The Unique Thelonious Monk (1956)
- Warne Marsh on Music for Prancing (1957)
- David Whitfield on Alone (1961)
- John Coltrane and Johnny Hartman on John Coltrane and Johnny Hartman (1963)
- Sarah Vaughan on Crazy and Mixed Up (1982)
