= Cannonball Enroute =

Studio album by Cannonball Adderley
- Released: 1961
- Recorded: February 7, 8, 11, & March 6, 1957
- Studio: Capitol (New York City)
- Genre: Jazz
- Label: Mercury

Cannonball Adderley chronology
Sophisticated Swing (1956)	Cannonball Enroute (1961)	Cannonball's Sharpshooters (1958)

Cannonball Enroute is an album by the jazz saxophonist Cannonball Adderley, released on the Mercury label, featuring performances with Nat Adderley, Junior Mance, Sam Jones, and Jimmy Cobb. The album was recorded in 1957 and 1958 but would only be released in 1961.

== Reception ==
Professional ratings
Review scores
Source	Rating
Allmusic	link

The Allmusic review by Scott Yanow awarded the album 3 stars and states "Cannonball Adderley's Mercury albums (most of which, like this LP, are long out-of-print) find the youthful altoist trying to unsuccessfully keep his quintet with brother Nat together. Despite the powerful bop-oriented music they consistently recorded, the band would break up in a year, only to regroup with great success in 1959."

== Track listing ==
All compositions by Nat Adderley except as indicated

1. "A Foggy Day" (George Gershwin, Ira Gershwin) - 3:49
2. "Hoppin' John" - 4:37
3. "18th Century Ballroom" (Nat Adderley, Ray Bryant) - 3:55
4. "That Funky Train" - 5:51
5. "Lover Man (Oh, Where Can You Be?)" (Jimmy Davis, Roger "Ram" Ramirez, Jimmy Sherman) - 3:56
6. "I'll Remember April" (Gene DePaul, Patricia Johnston, Don Raye) - 5:33
7. "Porky" (Julian Cannonball Adderley, Nat Adderley) - 3:58
8. "The Way You Look Tonight" (Dorothy Fields, Jerome Kern) - 4:27

Recorded at Capitol Studios in New York City on February 7 (tracks 1–3 & 5), February 8 (tracks 7 & 8), February 11 (track 4) 1957, and March 6, 1958 (track 6)

== Personnel ==
- Cannonball Adderley – alto saxophone
- Nat Adderley – cornet
- Junior Mance – piano
- Sam Jones – bass
- Jimmy Cobb – drums

Technical

- Marvin Glick – album design
