= In the Land of Hi-Fi with Julian Cannonball Adderley =

Studio album by Cannonball Adderley
- Released: 1956
- Recorded: June 8 & 18, 1956
- Studio: Capitol (New York City)
- Genre: Jazz, hard bop
- Label: EmArcy MG 36077

Cannonball Adderley chronology
Julian Cannonball Adderley and Strings (1955)	In the Land of Hi-Fi with Julian Cannonball Adderley (1956)	Sophisticated Swing (1957)

In the Land of Hi-Fi with Julian Cannonball Adderley is the fourth album by jazz saxophonist Cannonball Adderley, and his third released on the EmArcy label, featuring a nonet (six horns, three rhythm) with Nat Adderley, Jerome Richardson, Ernie Royal, Bobby Byrne, Jimmy Cleveland, Danny Bank, Junior Mance, Keter Betts, and Charles "Specs" Wright.

== Reception ==
The Allmusic review awarded the album 2½ stars.

Professional ratings
Review scores
Source	Rating
Allmusic	2.5/5 stars
The Rolling Stone Jazz Record Guide	3/5 stars

== Track listing ==
1. "Dog My Cats" (Ernie Wilkins) - 2:26
2. "I'm Glad There Is You" (Jimmy Dorsey, Paul Mertz) - 2:36
3. "Blues for Bohemia" (Julian Cannonball Adderley, Nat Adderley) - 3:56
4. "Junior's Tune" (Junior Mance) - 3:24
5. "Between the Devil and the Deep Blue Sea" (Harold Arlen, Ted Koehler) - 3:23
6. "Casa de Marcel" (Marcel Daniels) - 2:43
7. "Little Girl Blue" (Richard Rodgers, Lorenz Hart) - 2:37
8. "T's Tune" (Tommy Turrentine) - 3:13
9. "Broadway at Basin Street" (Al Frisch, Sid Wayne) - 3:43
10. "Just Norman" (Charles "Specs" Wright) - 2:31
11. "I Don't Care" (Ray Bryant) - 2:38

Recorded at Capitol Studios in New York City on June 8 (tracks 5, 7, 9 & 10) and June 18 (tracks 1–4, 6, 8 & 11), 1956.

== Personnel ==
- Cannonball Adderley - alto saxophone
- Jerome Richardson - tenor saxophone, flute
- Danny Bank - baritone saxophone
- Nat Adderley – cornet
- Ernie Royal - trumpet
- Bobby Byrne, Jimmy Cleveland - trombone
- Junior Mance - piano
- Keter Betts - bass
- Charles "Specs" Wright - drums
- Ernie Wilkins - conductor, arranger
