= Quanti Bomani =

American jazz musician (born 1956)

Quanti Bomani

(Yusufu) Quanti Bomani (born May 26, 1956), is an American jazz musician and multi-instrumentalist, composer, lyricist, and the leader of the band Urban Insight Group. His primary instrument is the saxophone (tenor, soprano, alto, and baritone). He is also a member of Prodigal Posse, an Eastern Caribbean diaspora band in Dominica that performs worldwide. He is the son of son of Luqman Abdul-Malik and Nana Bomani.

== Career ==
=== Early years ===
Born and educated in Harlem and Queens bouroughs of New York City, he received his college education in Virginia. He was influenced by his mother to play jazz and later in his life embraced the Afro-Caribbean influence and sound.

=== Musical influences ===
Bomani was influenced to play saxophone by British saxophonist Gary Windo in New York. Early in his career, Bomani was a saxophonist with Maurice Miller, playing straight-ahead jazz. In the 1980s he performed with Ahmed Abdul-Malik's East meets West ensemble. He has performed at the World Creole Music Festival and Creole in the Park with Delmance "Ras Mo" Moses and the Mo n' Mo Music Project. Quanti Bomani with Urban Insight Group has performed throughout the U.S. and in international venues. His trip to India in 2005 and to Vietnam influenced his 2011 album Africans on the Rooftop.

=== Political activism ===
His song "Candy Bar" criticizes war and its impact on individuals, children, and families. His song "Don't Let Nobody Put the Big Britches on You" is about media deception and war propaganda. The song "We're Falling" decries drug violence and violence used for profit of natural resources. His concerts contain much political commentary. He participated in the 2010 fundraiser sponsored by the California Jazz Foundation to raise money for a musician health care fund. In 2012, he was one of the main acts at the Children's Heart Fund benefit concert at the Old Mill Cultural Center in Dominica with Arturo Tappin and Ronald "Boo" Hinkson.

=== Music and performing ===
Bomani released his album View of the World (2005), which was recorded and produced at Bay Bridge Music, an affiliate of Bay Bridge Records. His album debuted at the Paramount Theater (Oakland, California). His subsequent concerts included performances at San Francisco's Great American Music Hall, Yoshi's (jazz club), and Velma's Jazz n' Blues Club.

In 2013, Bomani performed with Michele Henderson at the Jazz n' Creole Festival in Fort Shirley, Cabrits, Dominica after performing together in Rodney Bay during the St. Lucia Jazz Festival.
