= Rollins Plays for Bird =

1957 studio album by Sonny Rollins

Studio album by Sonny Rollins
- Released: End of July 1957
- Recorded: October 5, 1956
- Studio: Van Gelder Studio, Hackensack, New Jersey
- Genre: Jazz
- Length: 43:22
- Label: Prestige
- Producer: Bob Weinstock

Sonny Rollins chronology
| Saxophone Colossus (1956) | Rollins Plays for Bird (1957) | Tour de Force (1956) |

Rollins Plays for Bird is a 1957 album by jazz saxophonist Sonny Rollins, recorded for the Prestige label, featuring performances by Rollins with Kenny Dorham, Wade Legge, George Morrow and Max Roach on material associated with Charlie Parker.

== Reception ==
Professional ratings
Review scores
| Source | Rating |
|---|---|
| AllMusic | 4/5 stars |
| The Penguin Guide to Jazz Recordings | 3.5/4 stars |
| The Rolling Stone Jazz Record Guide | 3/5 stars |

The AllMusic review by Michael G. Nastos describes the album as "[a] disappointment in terms of the division of labor, and not the merging of titans jazz lovers would have wished for, this recording still provides a great deal of high level music that could have been so much more".

== Track listing ==
All compositions by Sonny Rollins except where noted.

1. "Bird Medley: I Remember You/My Melancholy Baby/Old Folks/They Can't Take That Away From Me/Just Friends/My Little Suede Shoes/Star Eyes" (Johnny Mercer, Victor Schertzinger/Ernie Burnett, George A. Norton/Dedette Lee Hill, Willard Robison/George Gershwin, Ira Gershwin/John Klenner, Sam M. Lewis/Charlie Parker/Gene DePaul, Don Raye) – 26:55
2. "Kids Know" – 11:39
3. "I've Grown Accustomed to Her Face" (Alan Jay Lerner, Frederick Loewe) – 4:52
4. "The House I Live In" (Lewis Allan, Earl Robinson) – 9:21 Bonus track on the RVG Prestige edition

== Personnel ==
- Sonny Rollins – tenor saxophone
- Kenny Dorham – trumpet (except 3)
- Wade Legge – piano
- George Morrow – bass
- Max Roach – drums
