= Chris Murrell =

- Born: Byron Christopher Murrell; December 18, 1956; Winston-Salem, North Carolina, U.S.
- Died: June 18, 2017 (aged 60) Winston-Salem, North Carolina, U.S.
- Genres: Gospel, jazz
- Occupation: Singer

Byron Christopher Murrell (December 18, 1956 – June 18, 2017) was an American jazz and gospel singer who has toured as the featured vocalist for the Count Basie Orchestra and has made appearances with the Roger Humphries Big Band and performed for a SCETV special with the Andrew Thielen Big Band.

== Biography ==
Murrell began singing as a young child and continued to study voice and perform through his childhood, singing in church and school functions. As a teenager, he traveled and performed throughout the US with his own seven-piece gospel group, the Christian Disciples.

Murrell graduated from Wake Forest University in 1979 with a degree in theater, and was a lifelong resident of Winston-Salem, North Carolina. In May 1986, Frank Foster was the guest soloist at a concert with the North Carolina School of the Arts Jazz Ensemble in Winston-Salem, North Carolina. Chris was invited to be a guest vocal soloist on the same concert, where Foster, who was shortly to take over as leader of the Count Basie Orchestra, heard Chris's rendition of "Lush Life"; when the opportunity presented itself, he hired Chris to be the featured vocalist with the Count Basie Orchestra. He toured worldwide with the Count Basie Orchestra until 2002.

In 2002, Murrell released a solo album, Reprise; in the liner notes, Tony Bennett called him "one of my favorite singers". In 2004, his vocals were featured on the CD These Foolish Things by the Joe Aiello Trio.

Murrell died on June 18, 2017, at the age of 61 in his native Winston-Salem, North Carolina.
