= Mathias Claus =

German jazz pianist and composer

- Born: 15 May 1956
- Origin: Waiblingen, Baden-Württemberg, Germany
- Genres: Jazz
- Occupations: Musician, composer
- Instrument: Piano
- Website: mathiasclaus.com

Mathias Claus is a German jazz pianist and composer.

== Education ==
Education as jazz pianist at Musikhochschule Hamburg, studies with Dieter Glawischnig, diploma with excellence in 1989. Further studies with Ray Santisi at the Berklee College of Music in Boston plus classical studies with Shigeko Takeya and others.

== Career ==
Mathias Claus started collaboration recordings with musicians of the young cyber jazzscene worldwide. He contributed as guest player on numerous artists' CDs worldwide, working with many artists such as Peggy Morris, Nigel Hitchcock, Laurence Cottle, Sue Maskaleris, Daniel Martina, Fillipo Bertacche and others. Later on he started playing live concerts with his global musicians organising common tours and concerts in Germany with American artists Peggy Morris, Eyran Katsenelenbogen, or Misha Steinhauer from Moscow.

In 2003 he gained international attention being interviewed by allaboutjazz.com and awarded by Bundesfonds Soziokultur e.V. for his international collaboration activities.

After gaining a teaching faculty 2004 in Braunschweig he started a career as jazz solo pianist. Recently he performed with some of the leading German jazz solo pianists at the 1. Hamburger Jazz Solo Piano Summit on 16 June 2007 for the NDR broadcast Hamburg and shared stage with players like John Taylor and Eliane Elias and was piano sideman for American vocalists like Gayle Tufts, Peggy Morris and Rachel Gould.

== Awards ==
Grant from GEMA Germany; Süddeutscher Rundfunk broadcast Music Competition laureate with his jazz quartett; finalist of the international jazz competition Hoeillarts in Belgium.

His music accompanying an animation movie for children (by Axel Bröthe) won the Adobe Design Achievement Award 2007 in San Francisco.
