= Parisian Thoroughfare =

American jazz standard

Song by Bud Powell

from the album The Amazing Bud Powell, Vol. 1
- Written: 1951
- Recorded: May 1, 1951
- Studio: WOR Studios, New York City
- Genre: Jazz
- Label: Blue Note
- Composer: Bud Powell

"Parisian Thoroughfare," also known as "Parisienne Thorofare," is a jazz standard composed by pianist Bud Powell. It is a contrafact of "Between the Devil and the Deep Blue Sea".

== History ==
It was first recorded by Powell in February of 1951 for Clef Records. However, the first recording under its ultimate title was recorded on May 1 with Powell, bassist Curley Russell, and drummer Max Roach for Blue Note Records. Powell recorded it again in 1963 in France with Gilbert Rovere and Kansas Fields.

== Notable recordings ==
- On the 1954 album Clifford Brown & Max Roach which was inducted into the Grammy Hall of Fame in 1999
- Jacky Terrasson and Tom Harrell included the song in their 1991 album Moon and Sand.
- Terrason also covered the song in 2002 album Smile.
- On the 1968 album The Jaki Byard Experience.
- On the 1965 album by salsa pianist Ricardo Ray On The Scene with Ricardo Ray Vol. 2 he first plays the tune with his trio as an instrumental straight ahead jazz piece which then breaks into a mambo featuring vocalist Chivirico Davila and trumpeter Ray Maldonado.
