= EmArcy Records =

American jazz record label, a division of Universal Music Group

- Parent company: Universal Music Group
- Founded: 1954
- Founder: Mercury Records
- Distributors: Universal Music Group (International); Island Records (U.S.)
- Genre: Jazz, world music
- Country of origin: U.S.

EmArcy Records is a jazz record label founded in 1954 by Bob Shad for the American Mercury Records. The name is a phonetic spelling of "MRC", the initials for Mercury Record Company.

During the 1950s and 1960s, musicians such as Max Roach, Clifford Brown, Cannonball Adderley, Dinah Washington, Paul Bley and Sarah Vaughan recorded for EmArcy.

Today, it is a European jazz label owned by Universal Music Group. The catalogue is managed by the Island Records subsidiary.

== Discography ==
Mono 12" LP series (1954–c. 1958)

Catalog number	Artist	Title
MG 36000	Dinah Washington	Dinah Jams
MG 36001	Erroll Garner	Contrasts
MG 36002	Clifford Brown, Maynard Ferguson and Clark Terry	Jam Session
MG 36003	Paul Quinichette	Moods
MG 36004	Sarah Vaughan	Sarah Vaughan
MG 36005	Clifford Brown	Clifford Brown with Strings
MG 36006	Helen Merrill	Helen Merrill
MG 36007	Clark Terry	Clark Terry
MG 36008	Clifford Brown and Max Roach	Brown and Roach Incorporated
MG 36009	Maynard Ferguson	Jam Session featuring Maynard Ferguson
MG 36010	Billy Eckstine	I Surrender Dear
MG 36011	Dinah Washington	For Those in Love
MG 36012	Lars Gullin	Lars Gullin
MG 36013	Bud Freeman's All Star Orchestra	Midnight at Eddie Condon's
MG 36014	Joe Turner and Pete Johnson	Joe Turner and Pete Johnson
MG 36015	Charlie Ventura	Jumping with Ventura
MG 36016	Various Artists	The Advance Guard of the '40s
MG 36017	Various Artists	Trumpet Interlude
MG 36018	Various Artists	Alto Altitude
MG 36019	Ralph Gari	Ralph Gari
MG 36020	Kitty White	A New Voice in Jazz
MG 36021	Maynard Ferguson	Maynard Ferguson Octet
MG 36022	Irving Fazola's Dixielanders/George Hartman and his Orchestra	New Orleans Express
MG 36023	Various Artists	Battle of the Saxes
MG 36024	Herb Geller	The Gellers
MG 36025	Joe Gordon	Introducing Joe Gordon
MG 36026	Erroll Garner	Garnering
MG 3602	Paul Quinichette	The Vice "Pres
MG 36028	Dinah Washington	After Hours with Miss "D"
MG 36029	Billy Eckstine	Blues for Sale
MG 36030	Billy Eckstine	The Love Songs of Mr. "B"
MG 36031	James Moody	The Moody Story
MG 36032	Lionel Hampton	Hamp in Paris
MG 36033	Phil Napoleon's Emperors of Jazz	Dixieland Classics
MG 36034	Lionel Hampton	Crazy Rhythm
MG 36035	Lionel Hampton	Jam Session in Paris
MG 36036	Clifford Brown and Max Roach	Clifford Brown and Max Roach
MG 36037	Clifford Brown and Max Roach	Study in Brown
MG 36038	Various Artists	Boning Up the 'Bones
MG 36039	Clifford Brown All Stars	Best Coast Jazz
MG 36040	Herb Geller	The Herb Geller Sextette
MG 36041	Mal Fitch	Mal Fitch
MG 36042	Eddie Heywood	Eddie Heywood
MG 36043	Cannonball Adderley	Julian "Cannonball" Adderley
MG 36044	Maynard Ferguson	Dimensions
MG 36045	Herb Geller	Herb Geller Plays
MG 36046	Maynard Ferguson	Maynard Ferguson's Hollywood Party
MG 36047	Terry Gibbs	Terry Gibbs
MG 36048	Various Artists	Vol. 1 – The Jazz Giants
MG 36049	Various Artists	The Jazz Giants: The Piano Players
MG 36050	Various Artists	The Jazz Giants: Reeds, Pt. 1
MG 36051	Various Artists	The Jazz Giants: Reeds, Pt. 2
MG 36052	Various Artists	The Jazz Giants: Folk Blues
MG 36053	Various Artists	The Jazz Giants: Brass
MG 36054	Various Artists	The Jazz Giants: Modern Swedes (not released?)
MG 36055	Various Artists	The Jazz Giants: Dixieland
MG 36056	Gerry Mulligan	Presenting the Gerry Mulligan Sextet
MG 36057	Helen Merrill	Helen Merrill with Strings
MG 36058	Sarah Vaughan	Sarah Vaughan in the Land of Hi-Fi
MG 36059	Lars Gullin	Lars Gullin with the Moretone Singers
MG 36060	Georgie Auld	In the Land of Hi-Fi with Georgie Auld and His Orchestra
MG 36061	John Williams	The John Williams Trio
MG 36062	Max Brüel	Cool Bruel
MG 36063	Cannonball Adderley	Julian Cannonball Adderley and Strings
MG 36064	Terry Gibbs	Vibes on Velvet
MG 36065	Dinah Washington	Dinah!
MG 36066	Jimmy Cleveland	Introducing Jimmy Cleveland and His All Stars
MG 36067	Blue Stars of France	Lullaby of Birdland
MG 36068	Kitty White	Kitty White
MG 36069	Erroll Garner	Erroll
MG 36070	Clifford Brown and Max Roach	Clifford Brown and Max Roach at Basin Street
MG 36071	Various Artists	The Jazz Giants: Drum Role
MG 36072	Joe Saye	Scotch on the Rocks
MG 36073	Dinah Washington	Dinah Washington in the Land of Hi-Fi
MG 36074	Patti Page	Patti Page in the Land of Hi-Fi
MG 36075	Terry Gibbs	Mallets a Plenty
MG 36076	Maynard Ferguson	Around the Horn with Maynard Ferguson
MG 36077	Cannonball Adderley	In the Land of Hi-Fi with Julian Cannonball Adderley
MG 36078	Helen Merrill	Dream of You
MG 36079	Morgana King	For You, For Me, Forevermore
MG 36080	Bernard Peiffer	Bernie's Tunes
MG 36081	Dick Johnson	Music for Swinging Moderns
MG 36082	Pete Rugolo	Music for Hi-Fi Bugs
MG 36083	Roy Haynes / Quincy Jones	Jazz Abroad
MG 36084	Roy Eldridge	Roy's Got Rhythm
MG 36085	Various Artists	The Young Ones of Jazz
MG 36086	Various Artists	For Jazz Lovers
MG 36087	Various Artists	Today Is Bargain Day – A Collection of All Star High Fidelity Recordings
MG 36088	Various Artists	The Greatest Stars of Jazz Under One Roof
MG 36089	Sarah Vaughan	Sassy
MG 36090	Georgie Auld	Dancing in the Land of Hi-Fi
MG 36091	Nat Adderley	Introducing Nat Adderley
MG 36092	Paul Bley	Paul Bley
MG 36093	Various Artists	The Jazz School
MG 36094	Freddie Slack	Boogie Woogie on the 88
MG 36095	Jackie Paris	Songs by Jackie Paris (not released?)
MG 36096	Thelma Gracen	Thelma Gracen
MG 36097	Bill Harris	Stompin' at the Savoy
MG 36098	Max Roach	Max Roach + 4
MG 36099	Jorgen Ryg	Jorgen Ryg Jazz Quartet
MG 36100	Nat Adderley	To the Ivy League from Nat
MG 36101	Gerry Mulligan	Mainstream of Jazz
MG 36102	Clifford Brown	Clifford Brown All Stars
MG 36103	Terry Gibbs	Swingin' with Terry Gibbs
MG 36104	Dinah Washington	The Swingin' Miss "D"
MG 36105	Bobby Jaspar	Bobby Jaspar and His All Stars
MG 36106	Rolf Ericson	Rolf Ericson and His American All Stars
MG 36107	Helen Merrill	Merrill at Midnight
MG 36108	Max Roach	Jazz in ¾ Time
MG 36109	Sarah Vaughan	Swingin' Easy
MG 36110	Cannonball Adderley	Sophisticated Swing
MG 36111	The Jazz Pickers	The Jazz Pickers
MG 36112	Joe Saye	A Wee Bit of Jazz
MG 36113	Bill Harris	The Harris Touch
MG 36114	Maynard Ferguson	Boy with Lots of Brass
MG 36115	Pete Rugolo	Out on a Limb
MG 36116	Patti Page	The East Side
MG 36117	John Graas	Coup de Graas
MG 36118	Lennie Niehaus	I Swing for You
MG 36119	Dinah Washington	Dinah Washington Sings Fats Waller
MG 36120	Stéphane Grappelli	Improvisations
MG 36121	Jimmy Raney and George Wallington	Swingin' in Sweden
MG 36122	Pete Rugolo	Percussion at Work
MG 36123	The Jazz Pickers	The Jazz Pickers featuring Red Norvo
MG 36124	Eddie Chamblee	Chamblee Music
MG 36125	Ruth Olay	Olay!
MG 36126	Jimmy Cleveland	Cleveland Style
MG 36127	Max Roach	The Max Roach 4 Plays Charlie Parker
MG 36128	Terry Gibbs	Terry Gibbs Plays the Duke
MG 36129	Billy Eckstine	Imagination
MG 36130	Dinah Washington	Dinah Sings Bessie Smith
MG 36131	Eddie Chamblee	Doodlin'
MG 36132	Max Roach	Max Roach + 4 on the Chicago Scene
MG 36133	Buddy Collette	Buddy Collette's Swinging Shepherds
MG 36134	Helen Merrill	The Nearness of You
MG 36135	Cannonball Adderley	Cannonball's Sharpshooters
MG 36136	Patti Page	The West Side
MG 36137	Big Bill Broonzy	The Blues
MG 36138	Steve Allen, Terry Gibbs and Gus Bivona	Allen's All Stars
MG 36139	Harry Arnold	Harry Arnold + Big Band + Quincy Jones = Jazz!
MG 36140	Max Roach	Max Roach + 4 at Newport
MG 36141	Dinah Washington with Terry Gibbs, Max Roach and Don Elliott	Newport '58
MG 36142	Cat Anderson Orchestra	Cat on a Hot Tin Horn
MG 36143	Pete Rugolo	Rugolo Plays Kenton
MG 36144	Max Roach	Max Roach with the Boston Percussion Ensemble
MG 36145	Gene Rodgers	Jazz Comes to the Astor
MG 36146	Cannonball Adderley	Jump for Joy
MG 36147	Joe Saye	A Double Shot of Joe Saye
MG 36148	Terry Gibbs	More Vibes on Velvet
MG 36149	Dinah Washington	The Queen! (not released)
MG 36150	Ramsey Lewis	Down to Earth
MG 36151	Franz Jackson and the Original Jass All Stars	Jass, Jass, Jass (not released)
MG 36152	Sarah Vaughan	No Count Sarah
MG 36153	Jimmy Cleveland	A Map of Jimmy Cleveland (not released under this number)
MG 36156	Gene Rodgers	Gene Rodgers Plays Richard Rodgers (not released)
MG 36159	Gerry Mulligan	A Profile of Gerry Mulligan (not released under this number)
MG 36160	Jimmy Cleveland	Rhythm Crazy (not released under this number)
MG 36161	Cannonball Adderley	Cannonball Adderley Quintet in Chicago (not released under this number)
MG 36162	Pete Rugolo	The Music from Richard Diamond
