= Brown and Roach Incorporated =

Studio album by Clifford Brown and Max Roach
- Released: 1955
- Recorded: August 2, 3, 5 & 6, 1954
- Studio: Capitol, 5515 Melrose Ave, Hollywood
- Genre: Jazz
- Length: 40:40
- Label: EmArcy; MG 36008

Clifford Brown and Max Roach chronology
Brown and Roach Incorporated (1955)	Clifford Brown & Max Roach (1956)

Brown and Roach Incorporated is an album by American jazz trumpeter Clifford Brown and drummer Max Roach featuring tracks recorded in August 1954 and released on the EmArcy label.

== Reception ==
Professional ratings
Review scores
Source	Rating
Allmusic	4/5 stars
The Rolling Stone Jazz Record Guide	5/5 stars

Allmusic awarded the album 4 stars calling it "Near-classic music from a legendary group".

== Track listing ==
1. "Sweet Clifford" (Clifford Brown) - 6:41
2. "I Don't Stand a Ghost of a Chance with You" (Bing Crosby, Ned Washington, Victor Young) - 7:19
3. "Stompin' at the Savoy" (Benny Goodman, Andy Razaf, Edgar Sampson, Chick Webb) - 6:23
4. "I'll String Along with You" (Al Dubin, Harry Warren) - 4:09
5. "Mildama" (Max Roach) - 4:30
6. "Darn That Dream" (Eddie DeLange, Jimmy Van Heusen) - 4:02
7. "I Get a Kick out of You" (Cole Porter) - 7:36
- Recorded at Capitol Studios in Los Angeles, California on August 2 (track 6), August 3 (tracks 1 & 2), August 5 (tracks 3, 4 & 7) and August 6 (track 5), 1954

== Personnel ==
- Clifford Brown - trumpet (tracks 1–3 & 5, 7)
- Max Roach - drums
- Harold Land - tenor saxophone (tracks 1, 3 & 5–7)
- Richie Powell - piano
- George Morrow - bass
