= Richie Powell =

American jazz pianist (1931–1956)

- Powell (standing) in 1956

Background information
- Born: Richard Powell; September 5, 1931; New York City, New York, U.S.
- Died: June 26, 1956 (aged 24) Near Bedford, Pennsylvania, U.S.
- Genres: Jazz
- Occupations: Musician; composer; arranger
- Instrument: Piano
- Years active: 1949–56

Richard Powell (September 5, 1931 – June 26, 1956) was an American jazz pianist, composer, and arranger. He was not assisted in his musical development by Bud, his older and better known brother, but both played predominantly in the bebop style.

After early work around Philadelphia and New York City, Richie Powell played in the bands of Paul Williams (1951–52) and Johnny Hodges (1952–54). He switched in the spring of 1954 to being pianist and arranger for the quintet co-led by trumpeter Clifford Brown and drummer Max Roach. This band toured extensively across the U.S. for two years, and released both studio and concert recordings, including the Grammy Hall of Fame inductee Clifford Brown & Max Roach.

Powell, his wife, and Brown were killed in a car crash when traveling overnight from Philadelphia to Chicago. Powell was beginning to achieve recognition at the time of his death, but he never had the chance to record as a leader. He had a playful piano style, and was fond of using musical quotations. His relatively heavy touch and use of left-hand fourths influenced fellow pianist McCoy Tyner.

== Early life ==
Powell was born in New York City on September 5, 1931. He was the youngest of three sons, after William, Jr., and Bud, seven years Richie's elder. Their parents were William, Sr. and Pearl Powell. The family was musical: William, Sr. was a stride pianist; William, Jr. led bands as a trumpeter and violinist; and pianist Bud became one of the leaders of bebop.

One account of why Richie took up the piano is that he pestered drummer Max Roach, who lived nearby, for drum lessons, and Roach, eventually fed up, suggested that he play the piano instead. Bud did not assist his brother at all in his musical endeavors; instead, according to a biographer of saxophonist Jackie McLean, "it was an excellent but now forgotten pianist named Bob Bunyan who taught Richie Powell chords on the piano. Richie would study with Bunyan, and then go home and watch his brother practice. [...] Richie and Jackie became tight friends and used to rehearse together". Richie also studied music with Mary Lou Williams, and attended the City College of New York.

== Later life and career ==
From 1949 to 1951, Powell worked around Philadelphia and New York City. He then played in the bands of Paul Williams (1951–52) and Johnny Hodges (1952–54). With Williams' R&B-oriented band he recorded four tracks late in 1952 that were released as singles. Powell also played on a medley track for the Hodges album Used to Be Duke (1954).

Powell was with Hodges' band in Los Angeles in the spring of 1954 when Roach needed a new pianist for the quintet that he co-led with trumpeter Clifford Brown. Powell was offered, and accepted, the job. He also became arranger for the quintet. They performed and rehearsed a lot, then had several recording sessions that August for EmArcy Records, which resulted in their first album, Brown and Roach Incorporated. In the same month, Powell was involved as pianist for some tracks at a session arranged for singer Dinah Washington that featured a studio audience. In September the quintet played for a fortnight at the Black Hawk in San Francisco, then began a tour of the eastern United States the following month. The band's saxophonist, Harold Land, reported that, when touring, "Richie was a little busy with the ladies. He had harems in almost every city".

Further recording sessions for Powell with Brown and Roach took place in New York during January and February 1955. The tracks cut in January, with arrangements by Neal Hefti, were released as Clifford Brown with Strings. The February sessions yielded the albums Study in Brown, and, combined with tracks from the previous year, Clifford Brown & Max Roach. The latter was added to the Grammy Hall of Fame in 1999. At the Newport Jazz Festival in July 1955 Powell played with Roach and others as backing for Washington. Recordings made of the Brown–Roach quintet at the same event were released decades later.

The quintet with Sonny Rollins, who replaced Land on tenor saxophone, recorded what became their last official album early in 1956. Clifford Brown and Max Roach at Basin Street contained playing at even faster tempos than on their earlier album releases. Several of the tunes were composed by Powell; on one, "Time", Powell played celeste in addition to his usual piano. Another was "Gertrude's Bounce", which Powell said was named following his admiration for the way in which artist Gertrude Abercrombie walked. The third of his originals, "Powell's Prances", was "a modal composition, with Brown and Rollins improvising on the scale rather than on the usual chord changes", a form popularized three years later by Miles Davis.

The band continued touring in 1956, including to Toronto. In late February or early March, Powell and Rollins, traveling together near Philadelphia, were involved in a crash that destroyed Powell's car, but they were not seriously injured. The quintet recorded under the leadership of Rollins in March for Prestige; this was released as Sonny Rollins Plus 4. They also had live national CBS Radio broadcasts from the Basin Street club in April and May. Two years of exposure with the Brown–Roach ensemble meant that Powell was beginning to achieve some recognition in his own right.

On June 26, 1956, Powell and his wife, Nancy, together with Brown, were traveling overnight by car from Philadelphia to Chicago. On the Pennsylvania Turnpike outside Bedford, in heavy rain, Nancy lost control of the vehicle, which crashed off the road and rolled down an embankment. All three were killed instantly. Nancy was 19; Brown, 25; and Powell, 24.

== Playing style ==
Although he also played swing and R&B, Powell was known as a bebop player. This included using right-hand single-note lines. In his playing with Brown and Roach, he was fond of inserting musical quotes, including from nursery rhymes and opera.

Powell usually played as part of a rhythm section in ensembles, so there are few recorded examples of him in smaller bands. In one 1954 session he recorded a trio version of "I'll String Along with You", on which he used "heavily chorded patterns with intriguing flourishes." Another exception to Powell being in a supporting role is his extended introductory section to a 1954 Hodges recording of "Autumn in New York". On this track, in the words of critic Marc Myers six decades later, Powell's playing was "regal, bouncy and appropriately lush, with shades of Erroll Garner, Al Haig and Richie's brother, Bud. [...] In 'Autumn in New York', we clearly hear a dramatic, playful pianist who was fast becoming an extraordinary talent."

== Influence ==
Pianist McCoy Tyner, who grew up close to the Powell brothers in Philadelphia, was influenced by their relatively heavy keyboard touch and their liking of percussive piano sounds. Tyner also got some of his inspiration for chord voicings from hearing Richie's use of left-hand fourths. Tyner's voicings became the norm for young jazz pianists. When Harold Mabern was at the beginning of his career, he emulated the harmonies in Powell's comping.

== Discography ==
Powell did not make any recordings as a leader.
Bootlegs and other unofficial recordings are not included.

=== Albums as sideman ===
Year recorded	Leader	Title	Label
1954	Johnny Hodges	Used to Be Duke	Norgran
1954	Dinah Washington	Dinah Jams	EmArcy
1954	Various	Jam Session	EmArcy
1954	Clifford Brown and Max Roach	Brown and Roach Incorporated	EmArcy
1954 [1970s]	Clifford Brown and Max Roach	Daahoud	Mainstream
1954–55	Clifford Brown and Max Roach	Clifford Brown & Max Roach	EmArcy
1955	Clifford Brown and Max Roach	Clifford Brown with Strings	EmArcy
1955	Clifford Brown and Max Roach	Study in Brown	EmArcy
1956	Clifford Brown and Max Roach	Clifford Brown and Max Roach at Basin Street	EmArcy
1956	Sonny Rollins	Sonny Rollins Plus 4	Prestige
