= Clifford Brown & Max Roach =

Studio album by Clifford Brown & Max Roach Quintet
- Released: Early December 1954
- Recorded: August 2–3 & 6, 1954 (original LP); February 24–25, 1955
- Studio: Capitol (Hollywood)
- Genre: Jazz
- Length: 43:44
- Labels: EmArcy; MG 26043
- Producer: Bob Shad

Clifford Brown & Max Roach Quintet chronology
Caravan (1955)	Clifford Brown & Max Roach (1954)	Clifford Brown All Stars, Jams Vol. 2 (1955)

Clifford Brown & Max Roach is a 1954 album by jazz musicians Clifford Brown and Max Roach as part of the Clifford Brown and Max Roach Quintet, described by The New York Times as "perhaps the definitive bop group until Mr. Brown's fatal automobile accident in 1956". The album was critically well received and includes several notable tracks, including two that have since become jazz standards. The album was inducted into the Grammy Hall of Fame in 1999. It is included in Jazz: A Critic's Guide to the 100 Most Important Recordings, where it is described by New York Times jazz critic Ben Ratliff as "one of the strongest studio albums up to that time".

First released as a 10" vinyl in December 1954 (MG 26043), it included only five tracks: "Delilah", "Parisian Thoroughfare", "Daahoud", "Joy Spring" and "Jordu", all recorded at Capitol Studios in Hollywood, in August 1954. In 1955, EmArcy released a 12" vinyl, adding "The Blues Walk" and "What Am I Here For", from a February 1955 session at Capitol Studios in New York City. Since then, it has been reissued multiple times, including in 2000 as part of the Verve Master Edition series with a replica of the original LP sleeve, new liner notes, and containing three alternative takes and one previously unissued track.

== History ==
The album is one of several that resulted from the partnership between Roach and Brown after Roach invited Brown in New York City to join him in creating a band. Brown and Roach together selected additional musicians to comprise the quintet from among the jazz musicians currently active in Hollywood. The band's early line-ups included Sonny Stitt, Teddy Edwards, Carl Perkins and George Bledsoe, but by the time the first of these sessions was recorded in August 1954, they had been replaced by the more long-term line-up of George Morrow, Harold Land and Richie Powell, the brother of jazz luminary Bud Powell. The band was prominent in the jazz scene; Land, brought in when predecessor Edwards declined to tour with the group, experienced an enormous increase in his reputation in the jazz world, while Land's successor (Sonny Rollins) would be springboarded by the visible position into superstardom.

== Critical reception ==
Professional ratings
Review scores
Source	Rating
Allmusic	4.5/5 stars
The Penguin Guide to Jazz Recordings	4/4 stars
DownBeat	4/5 stars

The album was critically well received. The Blackwell Guide to Recorded Jazz ranks it as among the best of the short-lived quintet, which in its 2½ years of existence "left behind a body of music that encapsulates all the best virtues of hard bop". "The numerous felicities of this tightly-knit working band", author Barry Dean Kernfeld wrote, "were seldom better displayed than in these dynamic performances". In its review, AllMusic describes it as "by far some of the warmest and most sincere bebop performed and committed to tape", indicating that "[i]t represents bop at its best and is recommended for collectors and casual fans alike".

== Notable tracks ==
According to The Rough Guide to Jazz, two of the songs featured on this album, "Daahoud" and "Joy Spring", have become "part of the standard jazz repertoire". The song "Joy Spring" was composed by Brown in honor of his wife, whom he called his "joy spring". She had been introduced to him by Roach as a student working to prove in her thesis that jazz was inferior to her field of classical music, a thesis Brown convinced her was mistaken. Ratliff describes these two songs, along with the tracks "Parisian Thoroughfare" and "Jordu" as "four of Brown's great performances".

Also notable is the album's version of the Victor Young theme song for the Cecil B. DeMille film Samson and Delilah, which Village Voice columnist Gary Giddins selected as the outstanding jazz track for 1954, though he describes it as "the most unlikely of vehicles". In a 2006 interview with The New York Times, jazz drummer Paul Motian also singled out the song "Delilah" for reference, praising its organization and arrangement, declaring it "Simple, but great". The Blackwell Guide to Recorded Jazz comments of the song that its "exotic mood" was "cleverly exploited", also noting that "[i]n Brown's sweeping solo, the commentary supplied by Roach is worthy of special study, as he seemingly anticipates every nuance of his co-leader's lines".

== Track listing ==
Except where otherwise noted, songs composed by Clifford Brown.

1. "Delilah" (Victor Young) – 8:03
2. "Parisian Thoroughfare" (Bud Powell) – 7:16
3. "The Blues Walk" – 6:53
4. "Daahoud" – 4:01
5. "Joy Spring" – 6:48
6. "Jordu" (Duke Jordan) – 4:00
7. "What Am I Here For?" (Duke Ellington) – 3:04

=== Verve Master Edition CD bonus tracks ===
1. "These Foolish Things" (Harry Link, Holt Marvell, Jack Strachey) – 3:39
2. "The Blues Walk" (alternative take) – 6:50
3. "Daahoud" (alternative take) – 4:06
4. "Joy Spring" (alternative take) – 6:44

== Personnel ==
- Clifford Brown – trumpet
- Harold Land – tenor saxophone
- Richie Powell – piano
- George Morrow – bass
- Max Roach – drums
