= Clifford Brown =

American jazz trumpeter, pianist, and composer (1930–1956)

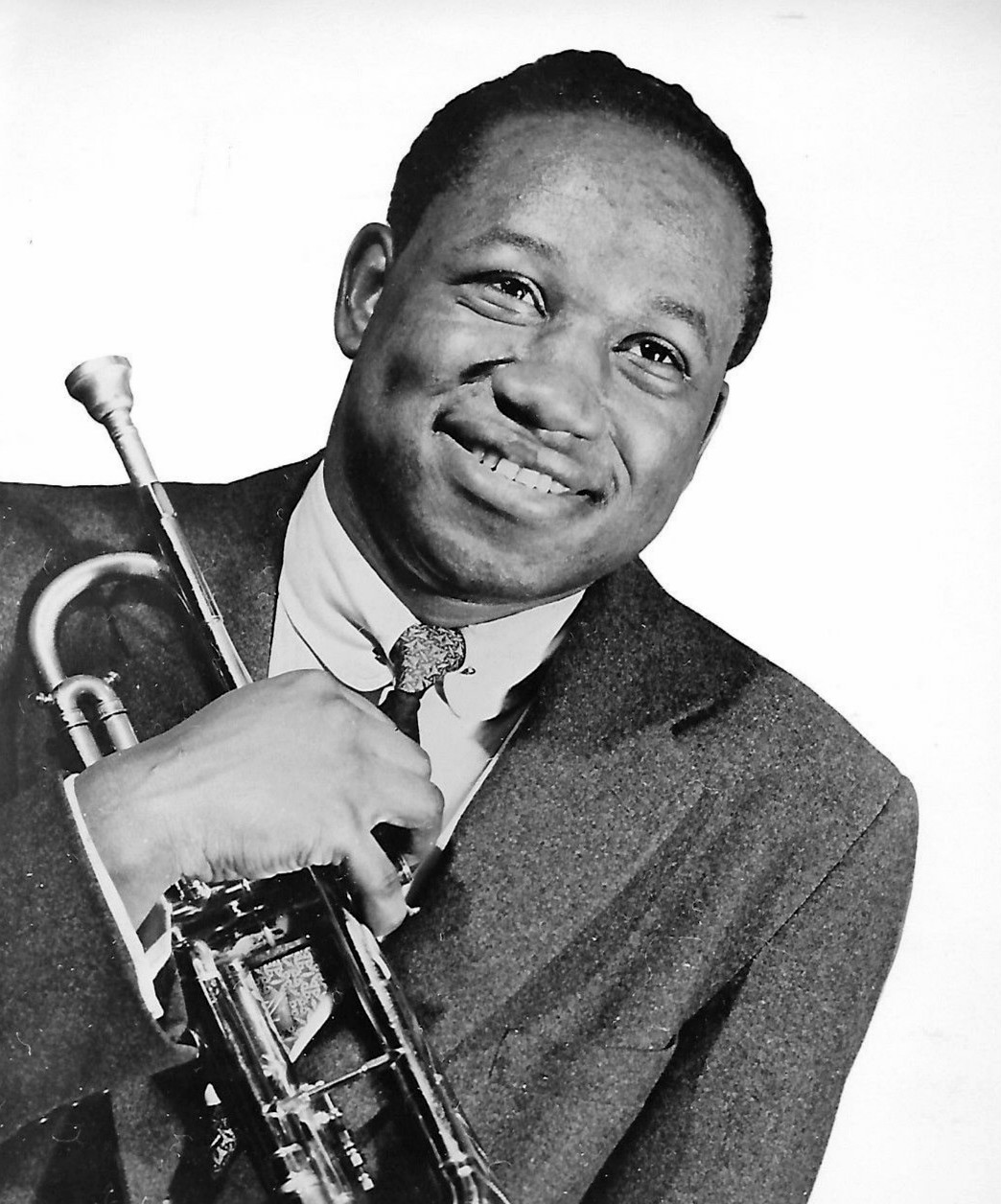
- Brown, c. 1956

Background information
- Born: Clifford Benjamin Brown; October 30, 1930; Wilmington, Delaware, U.S.
- Died: June 26, 1956 (aged 25) Bedford, Pennsylvania, U.S.
- Genre: Jazz
- Occupations: Musician; composer
- Instruments: Trumpet; piano
- Years active: 1949–1956
- Formerly of: Art Blakey Quintet; Clifford Brown / Max Roach Quintet

Clifford Benjamin Brown (October 30, 1930 – June 26, 1956) was an American jazz trumpeter, pianist, and composer. He died at the age of 25 in a car crash, leaving behind four years' worth of recordings. His compositions "Sandu", "Joy Spring", and "Daahoud" have become jazz standards. Brown won the DownBeat magazine Critics' Poll for New Star of the Year in 1954; he was inducted into the DownBeat Jazz Hall of Fame in 1972.

== Early career ==
Clifford Brown was born into a musical family in Wilmington, Delaware, United States. His father organized his four sons, including Clifford, into a vocal quartet. Around age ten, Brown started playing trumpet at school after becoming fascinated with the shiny trumpet his father owned. At age thirteen, his father bought him a trumpet and provided him with private lessons. In high school, Brown received lessons from Robert Boysie Lowery and played in "a jazz group that Lowery organized", making trips to Philadelphia.

His trips to Philadelphia grew in frequency after he graduated from high school. Brown briefly attended Delaware State University as a math major before he switched to Maryland State College. He played in the fourteen-piece, jazz-oriented Maryland State Band. In June 1950, he was injured in a car crash after a performance. While in the hospital, he was visited by Dizzy Gillespie, who encouraged him to pursue a career in music. For a time, injuries restricted him to playing the piano.

Brown was influenced and encouraged by Fats Navarro. His first recordings were with R&B bandleader Chris Powell. He worked with Art Blakey, Tadd Dameron, Lionel Hampton, and J. J. Johnson, before forming a band with Max Roach.

One of the most notable developments during Brown's period in New York was the formation of Art Blakey's Quintet, which would become The Jazz Messengers. Blakey formed the band with Brown, Lou Donaldson, Horace Silver, and Curley Russell, and recorded the quintet's first album live at the Birdland jazz club. During one of the rehearsal sessions, fellow trumpeter Miles Davis listened and joked about Clifford Brown's technical ability to play the trumpet. The live recording session ultimately spanned two days with multiple takes needed on only a couple of the tunes.

A week at Club Harlem in May 1952 featured alto saxophonist Charlie Parker and Brown. Brown later noted that Parker was impressed by his playing, saying privately to the young trumpeter "I don't believe it."

Just before the formation of the Clifford Brown / Max Roach Quintet, journalist Nat Hentoff and Brown interviewed for a DownBeat article titled "Clifford Brown – the New Dizzy".

== Later career ==
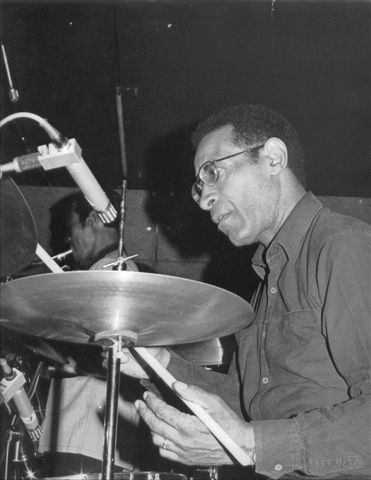
Max Roach, co-leader of the Clifford Brown / Max Roach Quintet

Max Roach's stature had grown as he recorded with a host of other emerging artists (including Bud Powell, Sonny Stitt, Miles Davis, and Thelonious Monk) and co-founded Debut Records, one of the first artist-owned labels, with Charles Mingus. Having participated in the legendary Jazz at Massey Hall concert of 1953, the drummer had relocated to the Los Angeles area and had replaced Shelly Manne in the popular Lighthouse All-Stars. Roach and Brown formed the joint Clifford Brown / Max Roach Quintet in the mid-1950s including tenor saxophonist Harold Land, pianist Richie Powell, and bassist George Morrow, with tenor saxophonist Sonny Rollins taking Land's place in 1955. Brown was in the L.A. area from March to August 1954, on the invitation of Roach, who arrived on the West Coast with other well-regarded jazz musicians including Miles Davis and Charles Mingus. Prior to their first outing, the 1954 Pasadena Auditorium Concert, Roach included Brown on the basis that the two would be co-leaders.

The band started when Brown and Roach rented a studio in California. With Brown able to play piano and drums in addition to trumpet, the co-leaders could experiment extensively with these instruments in the studio. They settled on the standard bebop quintet of trumpet, saxophone, piano, bass, and drums, with sax, piano, and bass players needed. When first choice tenor player Sonny Stitt chose his own musical direction, the bandleaders settled on saxophonist Teddy Edwards, former Count Basie Orchestra bassist George Bledsoe, and unconventional pianist Carl Perkins. Though the lineup was short-lived, the group "sent shock waves throughout the jazz community", according to Sam Samuelson.

As the band was still deciding on its personnel, Brown and Roach met alto player and multi-instrumentalist Eric Dolphy, who had his own apartment where he hosted jam sessions. Among the jam sessions' musicians were future quintet members Harold Land and George Morrow. Richie Powell (brother to Bud) arrived in the L.A. area around this time and was recruited as the quintet's pianist. The band accepted recording session offers and Brown composed several tunes that were adopted by the new quintet. Meanwhile, a larger, fully arranged band was organized for one of the upcoming recording sessions by Jack Montrose of Pacific Coast Jazz Records. The session "embrace[d] West Coast cool" with "immaculately performed charts", according to reviewer Gordon Jack of Jazz Journal.

An early session of the Brown/Roach Quintet, Clifford Brown & Max Roach, featured the new lineup performing several of Brown's latest compositions. Samuelson referred to the album as a "nice gamut between boplicity and pleasant balladry." Other albums featuring the Brown/Roach collaboration included Brown and Roach Incorporated and Study in Brown.

Brown also recorded albums outside the quintet, including the Pacific Coast Jazz session and two albums with jazz vocalist Dinah Washington. Both were recorded from a jam session setting and featured other jazz trumpeters, including Maynard Ferguson and Clark Terry. Following the Dinah Washington recordings, Brown slowed the pace of his recordings and returned to the East Coast, recording an album with Sarah Vaughan in December 1954.

The experiments in bop continued in the 1955 session Study in Brown, such as use of instrument sounds to mimic an inner city environment in "Parisian Thoroughfare" and "international flavor" in "George's Dilemma". Jazz critic Scott Yanow referred to the album as "premiere early hard bop" and noted the quintet's "unlimited potential."

A 1955 live performance by Brown with Billy Root and Ziggy Vines (sometimes mistakenly thought to have been recorded just before Brown's death a year later) was released on tape in 1973. Following this session, with Art Blakey temporarily replacing Roach following a car accident, the group toured, visiting Chicago and then Rhode Island for the Newport Jazz Festival. Roach returned for this performance and jam session at Newport.

Released in 1956, At Basin Street – the quintet's final "official album" – introduced Rollins. The album was called a "hard bop classic" and "highly recommended" by Scott Yanow. While previous quintet albums included original compositions, this one consisted mainly of jazz standards, although it did include a couple of Richie Powell's own compositions.

== Personal life ==
In June 1954, Brown married Emma LaRue Anderson (1933–2005), whom he called "Joy Spring". The two had been introduced by Max Roach. Clifford and Anderson celebrated their marriage vows three times, partly because their families were on opposite coasts and partly because of their different religious denominations – Brown was Methodist and Anderson was Catholic. They were first married in a private ceremony June 26, 1954, in Los Angeles (on Anderson's 21st birthday). They again celebrated their marriage in a religious setting on July 16, 1954, with the certificate being registered in Los Angeles County. A reception was held at the Tiffany Club where the Art Pepper / Jack Montrose Quintet had been replaced, a few days earlier, by the Red Norvo Trio with Tal Farlow and Red Mitchell. Anderson's parish priest followed them to Boston where, on August 1, 1954, they performed their marriage ceremony at Saint Richards Church in the Roxbury neighborhood.

In 1955, Clifford and Anderson had a son, Clifford Brown Jr., who became a jazz broadcaster and educator.

Brown stayed away from drugs and was not fond of alcohol. Rollins, who was recovering from heroin addiction, said that "Clifford was a profound influence on my personal life. He showed me that it was possible to live a good, clean life and still be a good jazz musician." Brown's enthusiasm for practicing the trumpet was noted by Lou Donaldson, who said Clifford would "do lip exercises and mouth exercises all day."

== Death ==
On June 26, 1956, Brown and Richie Powell embarked on a drive to Chicago for their next appearance. Powell's wife, Nancy, was at the wheel so Clifford and Richie could sleep. While driving at night in the rain on the Pennsylvania Turnpike, she presumably lost control of the car which went off the road west of Bedford, killing all three in the resulting crash. Brown is buried in Mount Zion Cemetery, in Wilmington, Delaware.

== Legacy ==
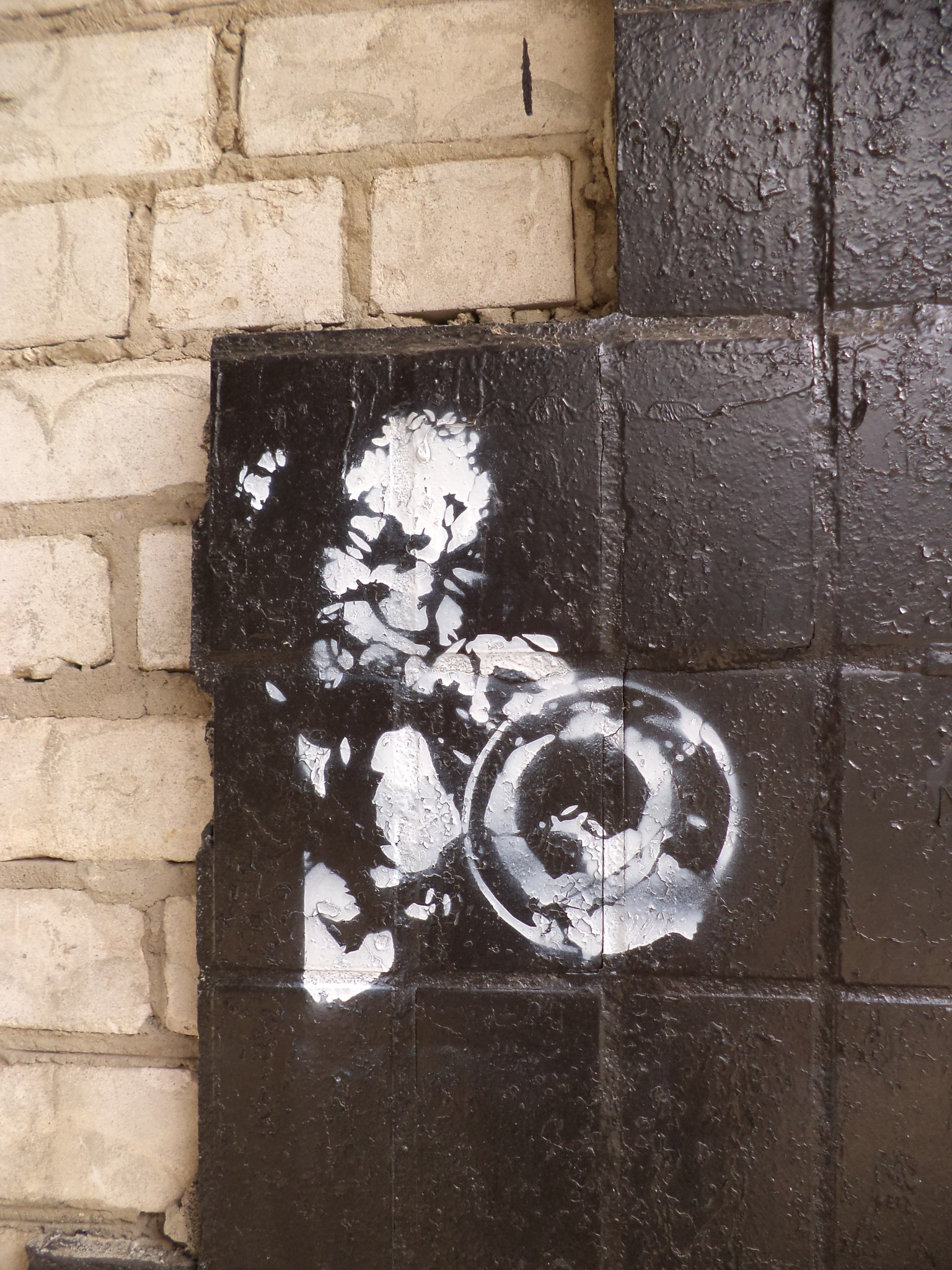
Street art of Clifford Brown

Jazz historian Ira Gitler said of Brown, "l'm sorry I never got to know him better. Not that it necessarily follows that one who plays that beautifully is also a marvelous person, but I think one can discern in Clifford Brown's case that the particular kind of extraordinary playing was linked to an equally special human being ... Photographs of Clifford Brown reveal some of that inner self; the shots in which he is depicted in a playing attitude show his intensity, that utter concentration and total connection with his instrument."

In the 1990s, video from the TV program Soupy's On (starring comedian Soupy Sales, who was a big jazz fan and booked several top musical stars for his show) was discovered of Clifford Brown playing two tunes. This is the only video recording known to exist of Brown.

Brown's nephew, drummer Rayford Griffin (né Rayford Galen Griffin; b. 1958), modernized Brown's music on his 2015 album Reflections of Brownie. Brown's grandson, Clifford Benjamin Brown III (b. 1982), plays trumpet on one of the tracks, "Sandu".

Benny Golson composed "I Remember Clifford" in 1957 as a tribute to Brown, to which Jon Hendricks added lyrics. Dizzy Gillespie, Art Farmer, Bud Powell, Art Blakey, and Golson himself used the song to pay tribute throughout subsequent years. Arturo Sandoval dedicated an album, I Remember Clifford, to Brown in 1992.

== Discography ==
=== As leader/co-leader ===
- 1953: New Faces, New Sounds with Lou Donaldson (Blue Note, 1953)[10 inch]
- 1953: New Star on the Horizon (Blue Note, 1953)[10 inch]
- 1953: Clifford Brown and Art Farmer with The Swedish All Stars with Art Farmer (Prestige, 1954)[10 inch]
- 1954: Clifford Brown & Max Roach (EmArcy, 1954)[10 inch]
- 1954: Brown and Roach Incorporated (EmArcy, 1955)
- 1954: Clifford Brown All Stars (EmArcy, 1956)
- 1954: Best Coast Jazz (EmArcy, 1956)
- 1954: Jam Session with Clark Terry and Maynard Ferguson (EmArcy, 1954) – live
- 1955: Clifford Brown with Strings (EmArcy, 1955)
- 1955: Study in Brown (EmArcy, 1955)
- 1956: Clifford Brown and Max Roach at Basin Street (EmArcy, 1956)

Posthumous releases

- Memorial Album (Blue Note, 1956) – LP version of New Faces, New Sounds plus New Star on the Horizon
- Memorial (Prestige, 1956) – LP version of Clifford Brown and Art Farmer with The Swedish All Stars
  plus A Study In Dameronia
- Jazz Immortal featuring Zoot Sims (Pacific Jazz, 1960)
- The Clifford Brown Sextet In Paris (Prestige, 1970) – recorded in 1953
- The Beginning And The End (Columbia, 1973) – compilation
- Raw Genius - Live at Bee Hive Chicago 1955 Vol. 1 & Vol. 2 with Max Roach (Victor, 1977) – live recorded in 1955. Japan only.
  Also released as Live at The Bee Hive (Columbia, 1979)[2LP]
- Pure Genius (Volume One) with Max Roach (Elektra Musician, 1982) – live recorded in 1956
- More Study in Brown (EmArcy, 1983)
- Jams 2 (EmArcy, 1983) – recorded in 1954
- Alternate Takes (Blue Note, 1984) – recorded in 1953

Box set

- The Complete Blue Note and Pacific Jazz Recordings of Clifford Brown (Mosaic Records, 1984)[5LP]
- Brownie: The Complete EmArcy Recordings of Clifford Brown (EmArcy / Nippon Phonographic, 1989)[10CD]

=== As sideman ===
- Art Blakey, Live Messengers (Blue Note, 1978)
- J. J. Johnson, Jay Jay Johnson with Clifford Brown (Blue Note, 1953), reissued as The Eminent Jay Jay Johnson Volume 1
- Art Blakey and The Jazz Messengers, A Night at Birdland Vol. 1 (Blue Note, 1954)
- Art Blakey and The Jazz Messengers, A Night at Birdland Vol. 2 (Blue Note, 1954)
- Art Blakey and The Jazz Messengers, A Night at Birdland Vol. 3 (Blue Note, 1954)
- Tadd Dameron, A Study In Dameronia (Prestige, 1953) [10 inch]
- Helen Merrill, Helen Merrill (EmArcy, 1955) – recorded in 1954
- Sonny Rollins, Sonny Rollins Plus 4 (Prestige, 1956) (also issued in Brown's name as Three Giants)
- Sarah Vaughan, Sarah Vaughan (EmArcy, 1955) – recorded in 1954
- Dinah Washington, Dinah Jams (EmArcy, 1955) – live recorded in 1954

== Filmography ==
1988: Let's Get Lost – "Joy Spring" and "Daahoud"

== Bibliography ==
- Nick Catalano, Clifford Brown: The Life and Art of the Legendary Jazz Trumpeter (Oxford University Press, 2001), ISBN 978-0195144000
