= Max Bennett (musician) =

American jazz bassist (1928–2018)

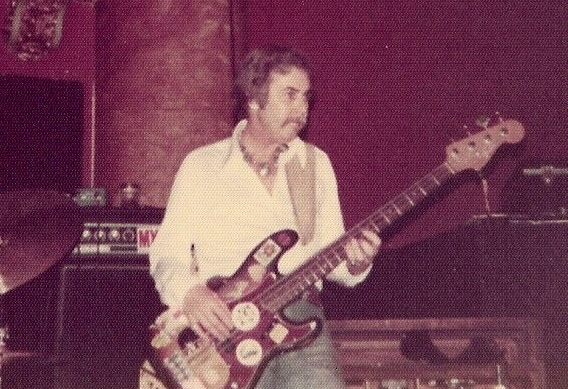
- Bennett in San Francisco, 1976.

Background information
- Born: May 24, 1928; Des Moines, Iowa, U.S.
- Died: September 14, 2018 (aged 90) San Clemente, California, U.S.
- Genres: Jazz
- Occupation: Session musician
- Instruments: Bass guitar, double bass
- Years active: 1949–2018
- Label: –
- Formerly of: L.A. Express
- Website: maxbennett.com

Max Bennett (May 24, 1928 – September 14, 2018) was an American jazz bassist and session musician.

== Early life ==
Bennett was born in Des Moines, Iowa, early family move to Kansas City, Missouri and grew up in Bennett, Iowa graduating from Oskaloosa High School Oskaloosa, Iowa. He also attended the University of Iowa in Iowa City, IA with a major in Music.

== Career ==
Max Bennett was naturally attracted to music at an early age, and quickly became proficient on bass guitar. He performed with many local groups as a high school student (during WWII) and was prominent as a performer with the Joe Glattly Ensemble after the war. Bennett's first professional gig was with Herbie Fields in 1949, and following this he played with Georgie Auld, Terry Gibbs, and Charlie Ventura. He served in the Army during the Korean War from 1951 to 1953, and then played and recorded in the New York and Los Angeles jazz scenes with Stan Kenton, Charlie Mariano, the Sauter-Finegan Orchestra, Frank Rosolino, Bill Holman, and others. During the mid-1950s, Bennett released three records under his own leadership for Bethlehem Records, a period when producer Creed Taylor was shifting the label's focus to jazz.

Bennett settled permanently in Los Angeles, where he did most of his work from the late 1950s onwards. During the 1960s and 1970s, he played regularly at the Lighthouse Cafe with his own ensemble and worked as a studio musician and occasional touring musician with such vocalists as Barbra Streisand, Ella Fitzgerald, Joni Mitchell and Joan Baez.

As a Los Angeles-based studio musician, Bennett recorded with artists in traditional pop field such as Peggy Lee and Billy Eckstine and with artists recording rock and roll and newer styles of popular music, like The Monkees, Frank Zappa and The 5th Dimension. Bennett often recorded with the group of musicians later known as The Wrecking Crew during the 1960s and 1970s. He began recording using the bass guitar during the 1960s (rather than the double bass on which he'd done most of his professional work during the 1950s). A widely-heard example of Bennett's electric bass playing is the 1976 theme from the Rocky movie soundtrack, "Gonna Fly Now".

In 1969, Bennett served as the principal bassist for Frank Zappa's Hot Rats project. According to Bennett, "I was not familiar with Zappa’s music. Our paths never crossed. I was never a big fan of avant garde music in that sense. It was while I was working in the studio, what was it, 1967 [sic], I think? And I got a call from John Guerin. He said, ‘Get your stuff over to TTG’—that was in Hollywood—‘I got a double session for you with Frank Zappa.’ So we get there and we worked two double sessions for two nights. And that was the album, that was Hot Rats.” He also played on subsequent Zappa albums such as Hot Rats follow-up Chunga's Revenge, and the intermediate sessions eventually given archival release as Funky Nothingness. In 1976 Bennett performed the bassline of "Gonna Fly Now", the theme song from the movie Rocky, composed by Bill Conti.

His studio work also included bass on the 1969 Lalo Schifrin soundtrack to the 1968 film Bullitt as well as Greatest Science Fiction Hits Volumes 1-3 with Neil Norman & His Cosmic Orchestra.

In 1973, Guerin and Bennett joined Tom Scott's L.A. Express alongside Joe Sample and Larry Carlton. After recording their eponymous debut album, the jazz fusion quintet served as the core band for Mitchell's Court and Spark (1974). A subsequent iteration of the group (including guitarist Robben Ford and pianist Larry Nash) backed Mitchell on the live Miles of Aisles (1974) and recorded two smooth jazz albums for Caribou Records following Scott's departure in 1976. After the band's dissolution, Bennett formed his own group, Freeway. Later on, he formed another live performance group, Private Reserve. Max continued to be active as a prominent musician in San Clemente and the Orange County, CA area until his death in 2018.

== Discography ==
=== As leader ===
- Max Bennett Quintet (Bethlehem, 1955)
- Max Bennett Sextet (Bethlehem, 1956)
- Max Bennett Septet, Quartet & Trio (Bethlehem, 1956)
- Max Bennett with Charlie Mariano (Bethlehem)
- Interchange (Palo Alto, 1987) U.S. Top Contemporary Jazz #13
- The Drifter (1987) U.S. Top Contemporary Jazz #21
- Images (TBA, 1989)
- Great Expectations (Chase Music, 1993)
- Max Is the Factor (Fresh Sound, 2006)

=== As sideman ===
With Hoyt Axton

- Southbound (A&M Records, 1975)

With Joan Baez

- Diamonds & Rust (A&M Records, 1975)

With Stephen Bishop

- Careless (ABC Records, 1976)

With Bobby Bland

- His California Album (Dunhill, 1973)

With David Blue

- Com'n Back for More (Asylum, 1975)

With Terence Boylan

- Terence Boylan (Asylum, 1977)

With Elkie Brooks

- Rich Man's Woman (A&M Records, 1975)

With Vikki Carr

- Ms. America (Columbia, 1973)

With Keith Carradine

- I'm Easy (Asylum, 1976)

With David Cassidy

- Cherish (Bell, 1972)
- Rock Me Baby (Bell, 1973)
- Dreams Are Nuthin' More Than Wishes (Bell, 1973)

With Ry Cooder

- Ry Cooder (Reprise Records, 1970)

With Bob Cooper

- Coop! The Music of Bob Cooper (Contemporary, 1958)

With England Dan & John Ford Coley

- Fables (A&M, 1972)

With Bobby Darin

- Bobby Darin Sings The Shadow of Your Smile (Atlantic, 1966)

With The 5th Dimension

- Love's Lines, Angles and Rhymes (Bell, 1971)
- Living Together, Growing Together (Bell, 1973)

With Billy Eckstine

- The Modern Sound of Mr. B (Mercury, 1964)

With Don Everly

- Don Everly (Ode, 1971)

With José Feliciano

- Just Wanna Rock 'n' Roll (RCA Victor, 1975)

With Four Tops

- Night Lights Harmony (ABC, 1975)

With Michael Franks

- Michael Franks (Brut, 1973)

With The Friends of Distinction

- Grazin' (RCA Victor, 1969)

With Art Garfunkel

- Breakaway (Columbia Records, 1975)

With Bobbie Gentry

- The Delta Sweete (Capitol, 1968)

With Cyndi Grecco

- Making Our Dreams Come True (Private Stock Records, 1976)

With Henry Gross

- Henry Gross (ABC Records, 1972)

With Arlo Guthrie

- Hobo's Lullaby (Reprise Records, 1972)

With George Harrison

- Dark Horse (Apple Records, 1974)

With Johnny Hartman

- I Love Everybody (ABC, 1967)

With Jack Jones

- Harbour (RCA Victor, 1974)
- What I Did for Love (RCA Victor, 1975)

With Barbara Keith

- Barbara Keith (Reprise, 1973)

With Raymond Louis Kennedy

- Raymond Louis Kennedy (Cream, 1970)

With Stan Kenton

- Contemporary Concepts (Capitol, 1955)

With Bill LaBounty

- Promised Love (Curb Records, 1975)

With Peggy Lee

- The Man I Love (Capitol Records, 1957)
- Pretty Eyes (Capitol Records, 1960)
- Christmas Carousel (Capitol, 1960)
- If You Go (Capitol, 1961)
- Sugar 'n' Spice (Capitol Records, 1962)
- Blues Cross Country (Capitol Records, 1962)
- Mink Jazz (Capitol Records, 1963)
- I'm a Woman (Capitol Records, 1963)
- In Love Again! (Capitol Records, 1964)
- Then Was Then – Now Is Now! (Capitol Records, 1965)
- Big $pender (Capitol Records, 1966)
- Guitars a là Lee (Capitol Records, 1966)
- Somethin' Groovy! (Capitol Records, 1967)
- Bridge over Troubled Water (Capitol Records, 1970)
- Make It with You (Capitol Records, 1970)
- Close Enough for Love (DRG Records, 1979)

With Lori Lieberman

- A Piece of Time (Capitol Records, 1974)

With Lulu

- Lulu (Polydor Records, 1973)

With Barry Mann

- Barry Mann (Casablanca Records, 1980)

With Bette Midler

- Broken Blossom (Atlantic Records, 1977)

With Joni Mitchell

- Court and Spark (Asylum Records, 1974)
- The Hissing of Summer Lawns (Asylum Records, 1975)
- Hejira (Asylum Records, 1976)

With The Monkees

- The Birds, the Bees & the Monkees (Colgems, 1968)
- Instant Replay (Colgems, 1969)
- The Monkees Present (Colgems, 1969)

With Jack Montrose

- Blues and Vanilla (RCA Victor, 1956)
- The Horn's Full (RCA Victor, 1957)

With Walter Murphy

- Rhapsody in Blue (Private Stock, 1977)

With Michael Nesmith

- Nevada Fighter (RCA Records, 1971)

With Wayne Newton

- Daddy Don't You Walk So Fast (Chelsea, 1972)
- While We're Still Young (Chelsea, 1973)

With Jack Nitzsche

- Heart Beat (Capitol, 1980)

With Kenny Nolan

- A Song Between Us (Polydor, 1978)

With Tom Pacheco

- The Outsider (RCA Records, 1976)

With Austin Roberts

- The Last Thing On My Mind (Chelsea, 1973)

With Howard Roberts

- Antelope Freeway (Impulse!, 1971)

With Buffy Sainte-Marie

- Sweet America (ABC, 1976)

With Lalo Schifrin

- There's a Whole Lalo Schifrin Goin' On (Dot, 1968)
- Mannix (Paramount, 1968)
- Bullitt (soundtrack) (Warner Bros., 1968)
- Rock Requiem (Verve, 1971)
- Enter the Dragon (Warner Bros., 1973)

With Frank Sinatra

- Sinatra & Company (Reprise, 1971)

With O. C. Smith

- Together (Caribou, 1977)

With Otis Spann

- Sweet Giant of the Blues (BluesTime, 1970)

With Suzanne Stevens

- Crystal Carriage (Capitol, 1977)

With Barbra Streisand

- Stoney End (Columbia Records, 1971)
- ButterFly (Columbia Records, 1974)

With Jim Sullivan

- U.F.O. (Monnie, 1969)

With Gábor Szabó and Bob Thiele

- Light My Fire (Impulse!, 1967)

With Libby Titus

- Libby Titus (Columbia, 1977)

With Mel Tormé

- Mel Tormé and the Marty Paich Dek-Tette (Bethlehem, 1956)
- Mel Tormé Sings Fred Astaire (Bethlehem, 1957)
- Mel Tormé's California Suite (Bethlehem, 1957)
- Mel Tormé Swings Shubert Alley (Verve, 1960)

With Valdy

- Country Man (Haida, 1972)
- Landscapes (Haida, 1973)

With Frank Zappa

- Hot Rats (Reprise Records, 1969)
- Chunga's Revenge (Reprise Records, 1970)
- Studio Tan (DiscReet Records, 1978)
- The Lost Episodes (Rykodisc, 1996)
- Läther (Rykodisc, 1996)
- Quaudiophiliac (Barking Pumpkin Records, 2004)
- The Hot Rats Sessions (Zappa Records, 2019)
- Funky Nothingness (Zappa Records, 2023)

TV, film and motion picture soundtracks written by:

- Michel Legrand
- Nelson Riddle
- Michel Colombier
- Quincy Jones
- Tom Scott
- John Williams
- Henry Mancini
- Lalo Schifrin
- Johnny Mandel
- Charles Fox
- Artie Butler
- Billy Byers
- Elmer Bernstein
- Michael Melvoin
