= List of songs about close encounters with aliens =

This is a list of songs whose lyrics and themes are about close encounters with extraterrestrial aliens.

== 1940s ==
- "(When You See) Those Flying Saucers" by The Buchanan Brothers, released in July 1947, less than one month after the Kenneth Arnold UFO sighting which started the flying saucer era

== 1950s ==
- "The Flying Saucer Parts 1 & 2" by Bill Buchanan and Dickie Goodman
- "My Flying Saucer" lyrics by Woodie Guthrie 1950; recorded later by Billy Bragg and Wilco†
- "The Purple People Eater" by Sheb Wooley
- "Two Little Men In A Flying Saucer" by Ella Fitzgerald
- "Flyin' Saucers Rock & Roll" by Billy Lee Riley and Jerry Lee Lewis

== 1960s ==
- "Let There Be More Light" by Pink Floyd
- "Mr. Spaceman" by The Byrds
- "Set the Controls for the Heart of the Sun" by Pink Floyd
- "Voices Green and Purple" by The Bees
- "It Came Out of the Sky" Creedence Clearwater Revival
- "Have You Seen the Saucers" by Jefferson Airplane
- "U.F.O." by "Jim Sullivan"

== 1970s ==
- "After the Gold Rush" by Neil Young
- "Calling Occupants of Interplanetary Craft" by Klaatu (cover by The Carpenters†)
- "Childhood's End" by Pink Floyd
- "Come Sail Away" by Styx†
- "Here Come the Martian Martians" by Jonathan Richman and the Modern Lovers
- "Horsell Commons and the Heat Ray" by Jeff Wayne (Jeff Wayne's Musical Version of The War of the Worlds)
- "I've Seen the Saucers" by Elton John
- "Longer Boats" by Cat Stevens
- "Martian Boogie" by Brownsville Station
- "Mothership Connection" by Parliament
- "Planet Claire" by The B-52s
- "Starman" by David Bowie
- "Starship Trooper" by Yes
- "Arriving UFO" by Yes
- "Waiting for the UFOs" by Graham Parker
- "Silver Lights" Sammy Hagar
- "UFO" by Johnny Rivers
- "Children of the Sun" Billy Thorpe
- "Starrider" by Foreigner
- "Strange Ships" by Fox
- "Ships in the Sky" by Wishbone Ash
- "UFO" by Sun Ra

== 1980s ==
- "Fire Of Unknown Origin" by Blue Öyster Cult
- "Books about UFOs" by Hüsker Dü
- "Flying Saucers" by Nina Hagen
- "Love Walks In" by Van Halen
- "Loving the Alien" by David Bowie
- "No Doubt About It" by Hot Chocolate
- "Nobody Told Me" by John Lennon
- "Rapture" by Blondie
- "Zero Zero UFO" by The Ramones
- "I Ran (So Far Away)" by A Flock of Seagulls
- "Caught in the Crossfire" by April Wine
- "Don't Be Late" by Saga
- "Little Green Men", Flex-Able by Steve Vai
- "Cosmic Thing" by The B-52s
- "I saw Elvis in a UFO", Beside Myself by Ray Stevens

== 1990s ==
- "The Alien Song (For Those Who Listen)" by Mila Jovovich
- "El Aparato ("The Apparatus")" by Café Tacvba
- "Alien (I Am)" by Hawkwind
- "Aliens Exist" by Blink-182
- "Alien Visitors" by Man or Astro-man?
- "Million Miles From Home" by Dune
- "Another Sunday" by I Mother Earth
- "Fell in Love with an Alien" by the Kelly Family
- "Hangar 18" by Megadeth
- "Hat Too Flat" by Walter Becker
- "I Made Love to a Martian" by Mustard Plug
- "Girl from Mars" by Ash
- "Martian Dance Invasion" by Brainiac
- "Motorway to Roswell" by Pixies
- "Scent of a Mule" by Phish
- "Shades of Grey" by Stuart Davis
- "Spaceman" by Babylon Zoo
- "Subterranean Homesick Alien" by Radiohead†
- "The Happening" by Pixies
- "Who's There?" by Smash Mouth
- "Spaceman" by Bif Naked
- "Is That You Mo-Dean?" by The B-52s
- "Men in Black" by Will Smith
- "Calgone" by Incubus
- "UFOs over Leytonstone", Feed Me Weird Things by Squarepusher

== 2000s to present ==
- "Fracture" by Edison's Children (Neil Armstrong's son's band) from their 11/11/2011 released album about an Alien Abduction "In The Last Waking Moments...", the opening song performed at the NASA Concert Celebration for 50th Anniversary of Neil Armstrong & Apollo 11 starring Rick Armstrong on bass & guitar
- "The Aliens Are Here" by The Hippos, 2000
- "And You Thought the Doctor's Probe Hurt" by Belvedere, 2002
- "Jaadoo, Jaadoo" by Rajesh Roshan (on Koi... Mil Gaya soundtrack), 2003
- "Concerning the UFO sighting near Highland, Illinois" by Sufjan Stevens on Illinois, 2005
- "Aliens" by Doctor Octagon, 2006
- "UFO"† by Sneaky Sound System, 2006
- "Rosetta Stoned", by Tool on 10,000 Days, 2006
- "Fallout of the 4th Kind", by Edison's Children on In The Last Waking Moments..., 2011, in this creepy final section of Edison's Children's alien abduction concept album our protagonist wakes up inside the hull of UAP to find that this was not a descent into madness, as he was led to believe by doctors and family in the previous song "The Awakening", but really happening to him.
- "We're Not Alone" by Nas on Untitled Nas album, 2008
- "Spaceman" by The Killers, 2008
- "Venus Ambassador" by Bryan Scary & The Shredding Tears, 2009
- "E.T." by Katy Perry, featuring Kanye West, 2010
- "Zopilotes" ("Black Vultures") by Café Tacuba on El Objeto Antes Llamado Disco, 2012
- "A Million Miles Away (I Wish I Had A Time Machine)" by Astronaut Neil Armstrong's son's band Edison's Children from "In The Last Waking Moments...", 11/11/11 *Tweeted by Giorgio A. Tsoukalos in 2011 after having it and The Awakening played for him in a private acoustic concert in Chicago"
- "The Awakening" by Astronaut Neil Armstrong's son's band Edison's Children from "In The Last Waking Moments...", 11/11/11 *Tweeted by Giorgio A. Tsoukalos in 2011 after having it & A Million Miles Away (I Wish I Had A Time Machine" played for him in a private acoustic concert in Chicago"
- "Ancient Aliens" by Lemon Demon on Spirit Phone, 2016
- "Decks Dark" by Radiohead on A Moon Shaped Pool, 2016
- "Hey Aliens" by The Bouncing Souls on Simplicity, 2016
- "Spaceship" by Kesha, 2017
- "Herd Culling" by Porcupine Tree on CLOSURE/CONTINUATION, 2022
- "Silver Circles" by Upchurch, 2023
- "End of the World" by Tom MacDonald, 2023
- "Staring at the Stars" by Dan Marfisi and Glenn Jordan, 2023 (recorded 1998)
- "An Alien Abduction Story (The Probing)" by The Schnooks, 2024
- "Down Bad (Taylor Swift song)" by Taylor Swift, 2024

== Notes ==
† Bumper music on StarTalk UFO episode
