= Paul Moer =

American jazz musician (1916–2010)

Paul Moerschbacher (July 22, 1916 – June 9, 2010), better known as Paul Moer, was an American jazz pianist.

Moer attended the University of Miami, graduating in 1951, and following this played frequently on the West Coast jazz scene with Benny Carter, Vido Musso, Zoot Sims, Stan Getz, Bill Holman, and Shorty Rogers. Moer did extensive work in Los Angeles studios as a pianist and an arranger. He led his trio in the late 1950s with Jimmy Bond and Frank Butler. In 1960 he toured Australia with Benny Carter. He also recorded with Charles Mingus, Jack Montrose, John Graas, Paul Horn (1960–63), Ruth Price, and Buddy DeFranco.

Moer played little after the 1960s, though he made a comeback with a release in 1991 of Elmo Hope tunes.

== Discography ==
As leader

- 1959 The Contemporary Jazz Classics of the Paul Moer Trio
- 1961 Live at the Pour House
- 1991 Plays the Music of Elmo Hope
- 2005 Get Swinging

As sideman

With Jack Montrose

- 1954 Arranged by Montrose (Pacific Jazz)
- 1955 Jack Montrose Sextet (Pacific Jazz)
- 1956 Arranged/Played/Composed by Jack Montrose (Atlantic)

With John Graas

- 1958 International Premiere in Jazz
- 1958 Jazzmantics
- 2004 Westlake Bounce
- 2005 Jazz-Lab 1&2

With Paul Horn

- 1960 Something Blue
- 1961 The Sound of Paul Horn (Columbia)
- 1962 Profile of a Jazz Musician (Columbia)

With Jimmy Witherspoon

- 1959 Singin' the Blues
- 1997 Tougher Than Tough

With Dave Pell

- 1958 A Pell of a Time
- 2004 Say It With Music

With Jack Sheldon

- 1959 Jack's Groove
- 2005 Complete College Goes to Jazz

With others

- 1961 Yazz Per Favore, Emil Richards
- 1995 The Complete Capitol Recordings, Paul Whiteman
- 2000 Many a Wonderful Moment, Rosemary Clooney
- 2004 Live at Peacock Lane, Maynard Ferguson
- 2005 Complete Recordings, Bob Gordon
- 2006 Chet Baker & Art Pepper: Complete Recordings
- 2006 Complete Recordings, Billy Usselton
