= Yellow No. 5 =

Yellow No. 5 or Yellow #5 may refer to:

- Tartrazine or Yellow 5, a synthetic food dye
- Yellow No. 5 (EP), a 1994 EP by Heatmiser
- Yellow #5 (album), a 2001 album by Mustard Plug
- Yellow #5 (band), the band of Molly McGuire
