= Jam Session (album) =

Live album by Clifford Brown, Clark Terry and Maynard Ferguson
- Released: 1954
- Recorded: August 14, 1954; Los Angeles, California
- Genre: Jazz
- Length: 46:47
- Label: EmArcy; MG 36002

Maynard Ferguson chronology
| Jam Session featuring Maynard Ferguson (1954) | Jam Session (1954) | Dimensions (1955) |

Clifford Brown chronology
| Best Coast Jazz (1954) | Jam Session (1955) | Clifford Brown All Stars (1956) |

Jam Session is a live album by trumpeters Clifford Brown, Clark Terry, and Maynard Ferguson featuring tracks recorded in early 1954 and released on the EmArcy label. The album was recorded at the same session that produced Dinah Washington's Dinah Jams.

== Reception ==
Professional ratings
Review scores
| Source | Rating |
|---|---|
| AllMusic | 4.5/5 stars |

Billboard in 1955 wrote: "Good as all the sidemen are, it's the three trumpets which walk off with top honors. Recording is excellent." AllMusic awarded the album 4½ stars and Scott Yanow, in his review, calls it "A brilliant set that is highly recommended".

== Track listing ==
1. "What Is This Thing Called Love?" (Cole Porter) – 14:56
2. "Darn That Dream" (Eddie DeLange, Jimmy Van Heusen) – 5:16
3. "Move" (Denzil Best) – 14:28
4. "My Funny Valentine/Don't Worry 'bout Me/Bess, You Is My Woman Now/It Might as Well Be Spring" (Lorenz Hart, Richard Rodgers/Rube Bloom, Ted Koehler/George Gershwin, Ira Gershwin/Oscar Hammerstein II, Rogers) – 11:29

== Personnel ==
- Clifford Brown, Maynard Ferguson, Clark Terry – trumpet
- Herb Geller – alto saxophone (tracks 1, 3 & 4)
- Harold Land – tenor saxophone
- Junior Mance – piano (tracks 1, 3 & 4)
- Richie Powell – piano (track 2)
- Keter Betts, George Morrow – bass
- Max Roach – drums
- Dinah Washington – vocals (track 2)
