= Chet Baker & Strings =

Studio album by Chet Baker
- Released: April 14, 1954
- Recorded: December 30–31, 1953 and February 20, 1954; Los Angeles, California
- Genre: Jazz
- Length: 36:47 (original LP); 46:05 (CD reissue)
- Label: Columbia; CL 549
- Producer: Richard Bock

Chet Baker chronology
Grey December (1953)	Chet Baker & Strings (1954)	Jazz at Ann Arbor (1954)

Chet Baker & Strings is an album by jazz trumpeter Chet Baker recorded in late 1953 and early 1954 and released on the Columbia label.

== Reception ==
Professional ratings
Review scores
Source	Rating
Allmusic	3/5 stars
The Penguin Guide to Jazz Recordings	3/4 stars

Lindsay Planer of Allmusic stated: "This release offers a unique glimpse of a young Chet Baker in a quintet setting, complemented by a nine-piece string section... The easygoing and otherwise winding strings support the cool bop like a kite in a March breeze — light, airy, and conspicuous only in altitude".

== Track listing ==
1. "You Don't Know What Love Is" (Don Raye, Gene de Paul) - 3:30
2. "I'm Thru With Love" (Fud Livingston, Gus Kahn, Matty Malneck) - 2:39
3. "Love Walked In" (George Gershwin, Ira Gershwin) - 2:59
4. "You Better Go Now" (Irvin Graham, Bickley Reichner) - 3:06
5. "I Married An Angel" (Lorenz Hart, Richard Rodgers) - 3:37
6. "Love" (Hugh Martin, Ralph Blane) - 2:34
7. "I Love You" (Cole Porter) - 2:48
8. "What a Diff'rence a Day Made" (María Grever, Stanley Adams) - 2:40
9. "Why Shouldn't I?" (Cole Porter) - 3:35
10. "A Little Duet for Zoot and Chet" (Jack Montrose) - 2:37
11. "The Wind" (Russ Freeman) - 4:02
12. "Trickleydidlier" (Shorty Rogers) - 2:40
13. "You Don't Know What Love Is" [Alternate Take] (Raye, de Paul) - 3:30 Bonus track on CD reissue
14. "You Better Go Now" [Alternate Take] (Reichner, Graham) - 3:09 Bonus track on CD reissue
15. "A Little Duet for Zoot and Chet" [Alternate Take] (Montrose) - 2:39 Bonus track on CD reissue
- Recorded in Los Angeles, California on December 30, 1953 (tracks 3, 5, 10, 14 & 15), December 31, 1953 (tracks 1, 2, 9, 12 & 13) and February 20, 1954 (tracks 4, 6–8 & 11).

== Personnel ==
- Chet Baker - trumpet
- Bud Shank - alto saxophone, flute (tracks 4, 6–8 & 11)
- Zoot Sims - tenor saxophone (tracks 1–3, 5, 9, 10 & 12–15)
- Russ Freeman - piano
- Joe Mondragon - bass
- Shelly Manne - drums
- Sam Cytron, Jack Gasselin, George Kast, Eudice Shapiro, Paul Shure, Felix Slatkin - violin
- Lou Kievman, Paul Robyn - viola
- Victor Gottlieb cello
- Jack Montrose (tracks 4, 10, 14 & 15), Johnny Mandel (tracks 1, 6, 7, 11 & 13), Marty Paich (tracks 3 & 5), Shorty Rogers (tracks 2, 8, 9 & 12) - arrangers
