= Arranged by Montrose =

1955 studio jazz album

Studio album by The Bob Gordon Quartet Featuring Jack Montrose / The Clifford Brown Ensemble
- Released: 1955
- Recorded: May 6 & 27, July 12 and August 13, 1954
- Studio: Capitol, Melrose Ave (Hollywood)
- Genre: Jazz
- Label: Pacific Jazz; PJ 1214
- Producer: Richard Bock

Jack Montrose chronology
| Arranged by Montrose (1955) | Arranged/Played/Composed by Jack Montrose (1955) |

Jack Montrose Sextet is an album by saxophonist Jack Montrose recorded in 1954 for the Pacific Jazz label. The album compiles two previously released 10 inch LPs; Bob Gordon's Meet Mr Gordon and Clifford Brown's Clifford Brown Ensemble.

== Reception ==
Professional ratings
Review scores
| Source | Rating |
|---|---|
| AllMusic | 4.5/5 stars |

In the AllMusic review by Scott Yanow, he states: "Montrose's charts (which are full of unexpected surprises while always swinging and leaving room for plenty of solos) are quite notable and show that, despite the restrained tones, there was plenty of excitement to be found in West Coast jazz".

== Track listing ==
All compositions by Jack Montrose except as indicated

1. "Love Is Here to Stay" (George Gershwin, Ira Gershwin) - 2:21
2. "Meet Mr. Gordon" - 2:35
3. "Onion Bottom" - 3:25
4. "For Sue" - 3:45
5. "What a Diff'rence a Day Made" (María Grever, Stanley Adams) - 3:36
6. "Tea for Two" (Vincent Youmans, Irving Caesar) - 3:02
7. "Gone with the Wind" (Allie Wrubel, Herb Magidson) - 3:38
8. "Tiny Capers" (Clifford Brown) - 4:14
9. "Joy Spring" (Brown) - 3:18
10. "Blueberry Hill"(Vincent Rose, Larry Stock, Al Lewis) - 3:17
11. "Dahoud" (Brown) - 4:15

== Personnel ==
- Jack Montrose - tenor saxophone 1–6, arranger
- Clifford Brown - trumpet (tracks 7–11)
- Stu Williamson - valve trombone (tracks 7–11)
- Zoot Sims - tenor saxophone (tracks 7–11)
- Bob Gordon - baritone saxophone
- Russ Freeman (tracks 7–11), Paul Moer (tracks 1–6) - piano
- Joe Mondragon (tracks 1–6, 9 & 11), Carson Smith (tracks 7, 8 & 10) - bass
- Shelly Manne (tracks 7–11), Billy Schneider (tracks 1–6) - drums
