= Grey December (album) =

Compilation album by Chet Baker
- Released: 1992
- Recorded: December 14 & 22, 1953 and February 28, 1955
- Studio: Capitol Melrose Ave (Hollywood)
- Genre: Jazz
- Length: 53:05
- Label: Pacific Jazz; CDP 97160
- Producer: Richard Bock

Chet Baker chronology
Chet Baker Sings (1954)	Grey December (1992)	Chet Baker & Strings (1953)

Grey December is an album by jazz trumpeter Chet Baker compiling sessions recorded in 1953 and 1955 which was released on the Pacific Jazz label in 1992. The album compiles tracks previously released on the 1954 10-inch LP Chet Baker Ensemble, the 7-inch EP Chet Baker – Sings And Plays With Bud Shank, Russ Freeman And Strings, along with previously unissued alternate takes.

The CD cover uses the same picture by William Claxton as the original cover of LP Chet Baker Ensemble.

== Reception ==
Professional ratings
Review scores
Source	Rating
Allmusic	4/5 stars

Allmusic rated the album with 4 stars, stating: "Grey December is one of the better CD reissues featuring Baker's early-'50s recordings on Pacific Jazz, the purveyors of West Coast cool".

== Track listing ==
All compositions by Jack Montrose except as indicated

1. "Grey December" (Frank Campo) – 3:40
2. "I Wish I Knew" (Mack Gordon, Harry Warren) – 3:59
3. "Someone to Watch over Me" (George Gershwin, Ira Gershwin) – 3:00
4. "This Is Always" (Gordon, Warren) – 3:06
5. "Headline" (Jack Montrose) – 3:07
6. "Ergo" (Jack Montrose) – 3:08
7. "Bockhanal" (Jack Montrose) – 2:58
8. "Bockhanal" [Alternate Take] (Jack Montrose) – 2:33
9. "A Dandy Line" (Jack Montrose) – 2:48
10. "A Dandy Line" [Alternate Take] (Jack Montrose) – 2:48
11. "Pro Defunctus" (Jack Montrose) – 3:26
12. "Little Old Lady" (Stanley Adams, Hoagy Carmichael) – 2:47
13. "Little Old Lady" [Alternate Take] (Adams, Carmichael) – 2:00
14. "Moonlight Becomes You" (Johnny Burke, Jimmy Van Heusen) – 3:24
15. "Moonlight Becomes You" [Alternate Take] (Burke, Van Heusen) – 2:52
16. "Goodbye" (Gordon Jenkins) – 3:47
17. "Goodbye" [Alternate Take] (Jenkins) – 3:42
- Recorded at Capitol Studios in Hollywood on December 14, 1953 (tracks 5–10) and December 22, 1953 (tracks 11–17) and on February 28, 1955 (tracks 1–4)

== Personnel ==
- Chet Baker – trumpet, vocals
- Bud Shank – flute (tracks 1–4)
- Herb Geller – alto saxophone, tenor saxophone (tracks 5–17)
- Jack Montrose – tenor saxophone (tracks 5–17)
- Bob Gordon – baritone saxophone (tracks 5–17)
- Russ Freeman – piano
- Joe Mondragon (tracks 5–17), Red Mitchell (tracks 1–4) – bass
- Shelly Manne (tracks 5–17), Bob Neel (tracks 1–4) – drums
- Corky Dale (tracks 1–4) – harp
- Ray Kramer, Ed Lustgarten, Kurt Reher, Eleanor Slatkin (tracks 1–4) – strings
- Franco Campo, Johnny Mandel, Marty Paich (tracks 1–4) – arrangement
