= Herb Geller =

American saxophonist (1928–2013)

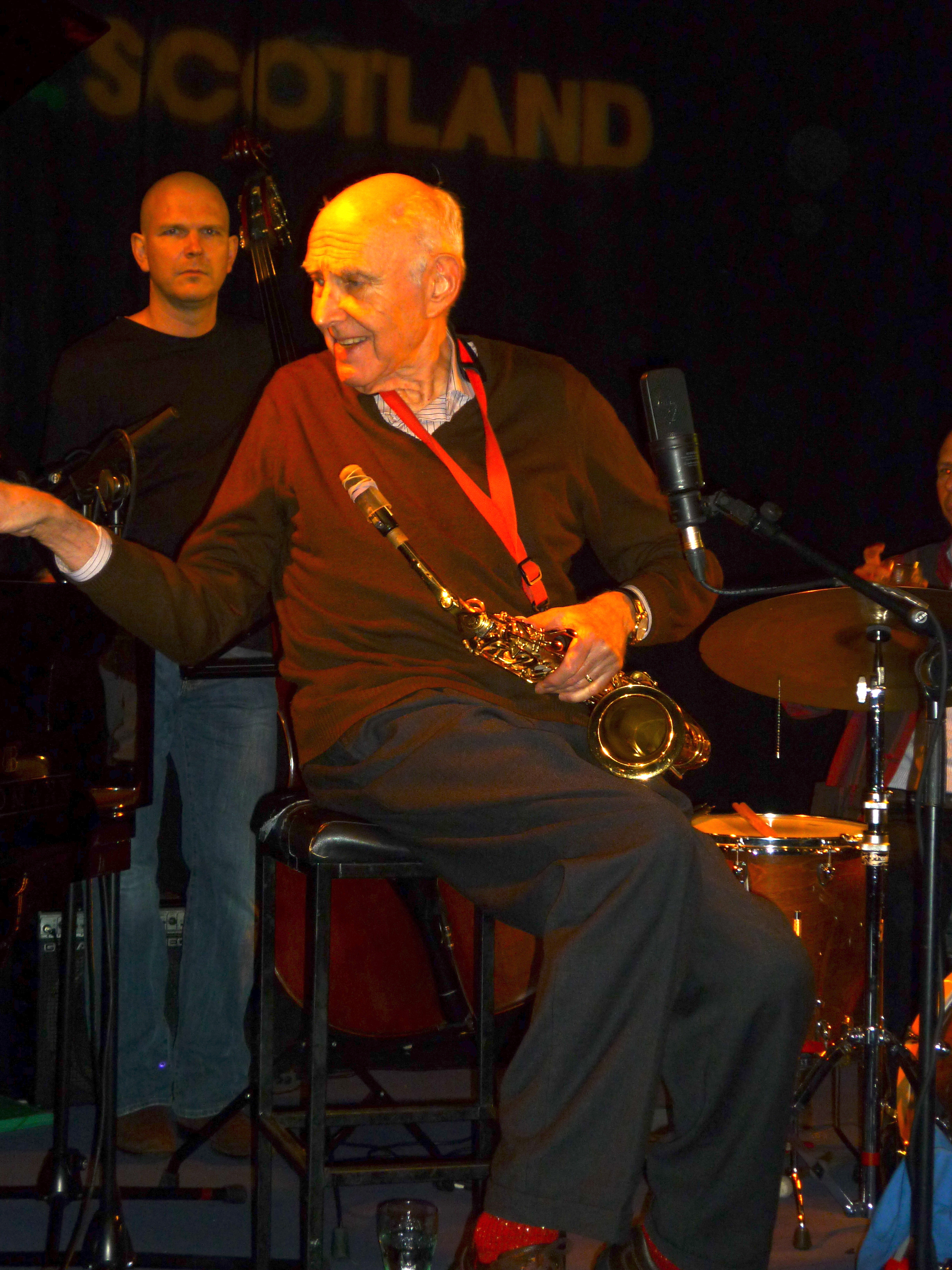
- Photo of Herb Geller

Background information
- Born: Herbert Arnold Geller; November 2, 1928; Los Angeles, California, U.S.
- Died: December 19, 2013 (aged 85) Hamburg, Germany
- Genre: Jazz
- Occupations: Musician, composer, arranger
- Instruments: Saxophone, flute
- Years active: 1946–2013
- Website: herbgeller.com

Herbert Arnold Geller (November 2, 1928 – December 19, 2013) was an American jazz saxophonist, composer and arranger. He was born in Los Angeles.

== Early life ==
His mother, Frances (née Frances Mildred Fullman, also known as Fannie Fullman; 1899–1980), worked at the Hollywood neighborhood cinemas playing piano, accompanying silent movies. At the age of 8, Geller was presented with an alto saxophone, purchased from a local music store owner and music teacher who was also a family friend and had a used instrument for sale. Two years later, he started playing the clarinet. Geller attended Dorsey High School in the southwestern part of Los Angeles and joined the school band which among others included the musicians Eric Dolphy and Vi Redd. At the age of 14, he heard Benny Carter perform at the Orpheum Theatre in Los Angeles and was so impressed that he decided to pursue a career in music, specializing on the alto saxophone. Two years later, he had his first professional engagement in the band of jazz violinist Joe Venuti.

A short time later, he discovered the music of Charlie Parker, who became an important idol along with Benny Carter and Johnny Hodges. In 1949, Geller went to New York City for the first time, where he performed in the bands of Jack Fina, (with Paul Desmond also in the sax section), Claude Thornhill, Jerry Wald, and Lucky Millinder. During this time, he met pianist Lorraine Walsh in Los Angeles. Geller and Walsh got married in New York and she became an important musical partner, in addition to pursuing her own solo career.

== Career ==
After three years in New York, Geller joined the Billy May orchestra in 1952 and, following an engagement in Los Angeles, the Gellers returned there to live. Among the groups Geller worked and recorded with were Shorty Rogers, Maynard Ferguson, Bill Holman, Shelly Manne, Marty Paich, Barney Kessel, André Previn, Quincy Jones, Wardell Gray, Jack Sheldon and Chet Baker. Lorraine worked as the house pianist at the Lighthouse Jazz Club, and played with Miles Davis, Dizzy Gillespie, Charlie Parker, Stan Getz, Zoot Sims, Jack Teagarden, Bill Holman and was the accompanist for the singer Kay Starr. Geller recorded three LPs as a leader for Emarcy plus some with Dinah Washington, Max Roach, Clifford Brown, Clark Terry, Maynard Ferguson, and Kenny Drew.

In 1955, he won the "New Star Award" from DownBeat magazine and achieved worldwide recognition through his recordings with Clifford Brown. Later, Geller worked in the bands of Louie Bellson and Benny Goodman.

Lorraine Geller died of an acute asthma attack in 1958. Deeply depressed, Herb Geller decided during a tour through Brazil with the Benny Goodman Orchestra not to return to the United States, but instead, to stay in São Paulo for six weeks playing bossa nova music at a local club and then depart on a ship to Europe.

== Europe ==
Arriving in Paris, Geller played with Kenny Clarke, Kenny Drew, the French pianist Martial Solal, and Belgian guitarist René Thomas among others, and also toured with a French radio show, Musique Aux Champs-Elysées.

In 1962, he was offered a job with the big band of the Radio in the American Sector (RIAS) station in Berlin. He accepted this engagement and performed there along with other Americans expatriates in Europe such as Benny Bailey, Joe Harris, and Nat Peck, as well as European musicians like Jerry van Rooyen, Åke Persson, and Francy Boland. In Berlin, he met his second wife, Christine Rabsch. Geller stayed there for three years and then accepted a contract to play lead alto and also arrange for the big band of NDR in Hamburg. Here, he was engaged for 28 years and made Hamburg his home. During this time, the NDR big band developed from a post-war dance orchestra into a leading modern jazz ensemble. The endless list of participating musicians ranged from Don Byas, Joe Pass, Slide Hampton, Bill Evans, Red Mitchell, Art Farmer, Georgie Fame, and Chet Baker to avant-garde musicians and rock/fusion, and included nearly all the big names of European jazz.

During his work at NDR, Geller was also busy with other things, including his own productions and tours. During this time, he also participated in recordings and worked with such famous artists as Ray Charles, Ella Fitzgerald, Peter Herbolzheimer, and George Gruntz among others.

During his tenure at NDR, he also learned and performed on other woodwind instruments, including clarinet, flute, alto flute, bass flute, piccolo flute, oboe, and English horn. On flute, he played and recorded with Bill Evans and Brazilian guitarist Baden Powell.

He also composed the music and lyrics to two musicals: Playing Jazz (a musical autobiography) and Jazzy Josie B. (based on the life of Josephine Baker).

In 1996, the Senate of the Government of Hamburg gave him the title of "Professor". He taught at the Hochschule für Musik in Hamburg until his retirement. He continued teaching jazz improvisation and composition, occasionally doing seminars at various national and international institutes. He wrote a method of improvisation called "crossover" for Schott and Sons.

Geller performed regularly in Germany and abroad as a soloist at festivals and clubs in various formations including some big bands as well as with such diverse artists as Knut Kiesewetter, Lennie Niehaus, Jiggs Whigham, Rolf Kühn, Slide Hampton, Buddy DeFranco, Lew Soloff, Charlie Mariano, Jan Lundgren, and Roberto Magris. He was very proud of his friendship with Benny Carter, his adolescent hero, with whom he recorded and performed. Geller participated at the Hollywood Bowl celebrations for Carter's ninetieth birthday in 1997. In 2008, he was featured on the Berlin Jazz Orchestra, music DVD (Polydor/Universal) Strangers In Night - The Music Of Bert Kaempfert which was released in 2012.

Geller died of pneumonia in a hospital in Hamburg, Germany, aged 85, on December 19, 2013. He had been undergoing treatment the past 12 months for a form of lymphoma. He is interred at Forest Lawn Memorial Park in Glendale, California.

== Discography ==
=== As leader ===
- 1954: Herb Geller Plays (EmArcy)
- 1955: The Gellers (EmArcy)
- 1955: The Herb Geller Sextette (EmArcy)
- 1955: Outpost Incident (EmArcy) – reissue of Sextette
- 1957: Fire in the West (Jubilee)
- 1958: Stax of Sax (Jubilee)
- 1959: Gypsy (ATCO)
- 1963: Alto Saxophone (Josie) – reissue of Fire in the West
- 1975: Rhyme and Reason: Herb Geller Octet Featuring Mark Murphy & Earl Jordan (Atlantic)
- 1975: American in Hamburg (Nova)
- 1984: Hot House (Circle)
- 1984: Fungi Mama (Circle)
- 1986: A Jazz Songbook (Enja)
- 1989: Stax of Sax (Fresh Sound) – reissue
- 1990: That Geller Feller (Fresh Sound) – reissue of Fire in the West
- 1994: The Herb Geller Quartet (V.S.O.P.)
- 1996: Birdland Stomp (Fresh Sound)
- 1996: Plays the Al Cohn Songbook (Hep)
- 1997: Playing Jazz (Fresh Sound)
- 1998: You're Looking at Me (Fresh Sound)
- 1998: I'll Be Back (Hep)
- 1999: Hollywood Portraits (Hep)
- 2002: To Benny and Johnny (Hep)
- 2005: The Herb Geller Sextette (Membran) – reissue from 1955
- 2005: The Gellers (Membran) – reissue from 1955
- 2006: Herb & Lorraine Geller: Two of a Kind Complete Recordings 1954–1955 (reissue/compilation)
- 2006: Plays the Arthur Schwartz Songbook (Hep)
- 2007: At the Movies with Don Friedman (Hep)
- 2009: An Evening with Herb Geller & The Roberto Magris Trio – Live in Europe 2009 (JMood Records, 2014)

=== As sideman ===
With Manny Albam

- Jazz Greats of Our Time, Vol. 2. (Coral)
- Jazz Lab Vol. 12 (MCA Coral, 1957)

With Chet Baker

- The Trumpet Artistry of Chet Baker (Pacific Jazz, 1953)
- Grey December (Pacific Jazz, 1953; reissued 1992)
- My Favourite Songs Vols. 1 and 2: The Last Great Concert (Enja, 1988)
- My Funny Valentine (Philology)

With Louie Bellson

- The Brilliant Bellson Sound (Verve, 1959)
- Louis Bellson at The Flamingo (Verve, 1959)

With Clifford Brown

- Best Coast Jazz – (Emarcy 1954) – with Joe Maini, Walter Benton
- Clifford Brown All Stars (Emarcy, 1954)

With Maynard Ferguson

- Jam Session featuring Maynard Ferguson (EmArcy, 1954)
- Dimensions (EmArcy, 1955)
- Maynard Ferguson Octet (EmArcy, 1955)
- Around the Horn with Maynard Ferguson (EmArcy, 1956)

With Benny Goodman

- B.G. World Wide (TCB/SWI, 1956)
- Santiaga De Chile 1961 (TCB)
- Swing Swing Swing, Vol. 1- 5 (Musicmasters)
- Yale Recordings, Vols. 1- 6 (Musicmasters, 1991)
- Yale Recordings, Vol. 8 (Musicmasters, 1957)

With Anita O'Day

- Anita O'Day Sings the Winners (Verve, 1991)
- Pick Yourself up with Anita O'Day (Verve, 1956)

With Shorty Rogers

- Shorty Rogers Courts the Count (RCA Victor, 1954)
- Shorty Rogers Plays Richard Rodgers (RCA Victor, 1957)
- Portrait of Shorty (RCA Victor, 1957)
- Afro-Cuban Influence (RCA Victor, 1958)
- The Wizard of Oz and Other Harold Arlen Songs (RCA Victor, 1959)

with Dinah Washington

- Dinah Jams (EmArcy, 1954)
- Jam Session (EmArcy, 1954) – with Clifford Brown, Maynard Ferguson, Clark Terry, Max Roach
- Dinah! (EmArcy, 1956)

With others

- The Alpin Power Plant Recorded in Switzerland (MPS, 1972)
- Bravissimo II – 50 Years NDR Bigband (ACT, 1998)
- Blue Night Special (Milan) (1993)
- Buddy Bregman Swinging Kicks (Verve, 1957)
- Benny Carter Over the Rainbow (MusicMasters, 1989)
- Kenny Clarke/Francy Boland Big Band & Stan Getz Change of Scenes (Verve, 1971)
- Don Fagerquist, Music to Fill a Void (V.S.O.P., 1957)
- Herbie Fields, Jazz Lab. Vol.9 (Coral, 1954)
- Ella Fitzgerald Ella Fitzgerald Sings the Cole Porter Songbook (Verve, 1956)
- Bob Florence And His Orchestra, Name Band: 1959 (Fresh Sound)
- Lorraine Geller, Lorraine Geller Memorial (Fresh Sound, 1954)
- Nils Gessinger, Ducks 'N Cookies (GRP, 1995)
- Nils Gessinger, Pass -ion (2011)
- John Graas Septet And Nonet Jazz Lab Vol. 19 (Coral)
- Peter Herbolzheimer Rhythm Combination and Brass, Wide Open (MPS, 1973)
- Peter Herbolzheimer Rhythm Combination and Brass Peter Herbolzheimer Masterpieces (MPS)
- Bill Holman, The Bill Holman Octet (Capitol,1954)
- Bill Holman, In a Jazz Orbit –(V.S.O.P., 1958)
- Quincy Jones, This Is How I Feel About Jazz (ABC Paramount/GRP, 1992)
- Stan Kenton This Modern World (Capitol, 1953); reissued on Plays Bob Graettinger: City Of Glass (Capitol, 1995)
- Barney Kessel Carmen (Contemporary, 1959)
- Rolf Kühn, Big Band Connection – (Milan) (1993)
- Jan Lundgren Trio with Herb Geller, Stockholm Get Together – (Fresh Sound) (1994)
- Roberto Magris Europlane feat. Herb Geller – Il Bello del Jazz (Soul Note, 2006)
- Shelly Manne, Shelly Manne & His Men Play Peter Gunn (Contemporary, 1959)
- Jack Millman, Jazz Lab. Vol. 11 (Coral, 1955)
- Marty Paich, The Picasso of Big Band Jazz (Candid, 1990)
- Ralph Pena, Master Of The Bass (V.S.O.P.)
- Art Pepper Art Pepper + Eleven – Modern Jazz Classics (Contemporary, 1959)
- Jimmy Rowles, Weather In A Jazz Vane (V.S.O.P., 1958)
- Inga Rumpf With the NDR Big Band, It's A Man's World (Extra)
- Howard Rumsey, Howard Rumsey's Lighthouse Allstars (Contemporary)
- Wolfgang Schlüter with The NDR Big Band, Good Vibrations (Extra)
- Bill Smith Quintet Americans in Europe Vol. 1 (Impulse!, 1963)
- Earle Spencer (1949)
- Mel Tormé, Mel Tormé Collection (Rhino, 1996)
- Klaus Weiss Orchestra, Live At The Domicile (ATM)
- Klaus Weiss Orchestra, I Just Want to Celebrate (BASF, 1971)
- John Williams, Here's What I'm Here For (Discovery/Antones, 1957)
- Phil Wilson, The Wizard of Oz Suite (Capri, 1989)
