= Maynard Ferguson's Hollywood Party =

Studio album by Maynard Ferguson
- Released: 1955
- Recorded: February 22, 1954; Los Angeles, California
- Genre: Jazz
- Length: 29:52
- Label: EmArcy; MG 36046

Maynard Ferguson chronology
Maynard Ferguson's Hollywood Party (1955)	Jam Session featuring Maynard Ferguson (1954)

Maynard Ferguson's Hollywood Party is an album released by Canadian jazz trumpeter Maynard Ferguson featuring tracks recorded in early 1954 and originally released on the EmArcy label as a 10-inch LP but reissued as a 12-inch album. The album was released on CD compiled with Jam Session featuring Maynard Ferguson as Hollywood Jam Sessions in 2005.

== Reception ==
Professional ratings
Review scores
Source	Rating
Allmusic	3/5 stars
Allmusic	4.5/5 stars

Allmusic awarded the album 3 stars but rated Hollywood Jam Sessions 4½ stars stating "Hollywood Jam Sessions has some of Ferguson's most exciting performances from his Los Angeles years".

== Track listing ==
1. "Night Letter" (Maynard Ferguson) - 14:08
2. "Somebody Loves Me" (George Gershwin, Ballard MacDonald, Buddy DeSylva) - 15:44

== Personnel ==
- Maynard Ferguson - trumpet, valve trombone
- Bud Shank - alto saxophone, flute
- Bob Cooper - tenor saxophone
- Bob Gordon - baritone saxophone
- Russ Freeman - piano
- Curtis Counce - bass
- Shelly Manne - drums
