= Clifford Brown All Stars =

Studio album by Clifford Brown
- Released: 1956
- Recorded: August 11, 1954
- Studio: Capitol, 5515 Melrose, Hollywood
- Genre: Jazz
- Length: 36:45
- Label: EmArcy; MG 36102

Clifford Brown chronology
Best Coast Jazz (1954)	Clifford Brown All Stars (1956)	Jam Session (1954)

Clifford Brown All Stars (also released as Caravan) is an album by American jazz trumpeter Clifford Brown featuring tracks recorded in 1954 but released on the EmArcy label posthumously in 1956.

== Reception ==
Professional ratings
Review scores
Source	Rating
AllMusic	3/5 stars

AllMusic awarded the album 3 stars and Stewart Mason, in his review, states "While nowhere close to bottom-of-the-barrel scrapings, these are clearly inferior performances".

== Track listing ==
1. "Caravan" (Irving Mills, Juan Tizol, Duke Ellington) – 15:10
2. "Autumn in New York" (Vernon Duke) – 21:35

== Personnel ==
- Clifford Brown – trumpet
- Herb Geller, Joe Maini – alto saxophone
- Walter Benton – tenor saxophone
- Kenny Drew – piano
- Curtis Counce – bass
- Max Roach – drums
