= Jam Session featuring Maynard Ferguson =

Studio album by Maynard Ferguson
- Released: 1955
- Recorded: February 23, 1954
- Studios: Capitol, 5515 Melrose Ave, Hollywood
- Genre: Jazz
- Length: 33:12
- Labels: EmArcy; MG 36009

Maynard Ferguson chronology
Maynard Ferguson's Hollywood Party (1954)	Jam Session featuring Maynard Ferguson (1955)	Jam Session (1954)

Jam Session featuring Maynard Ferguson is an album by Canadian jazz trumpeter Maynard Ferguson featuring tracks recorded in early 1954 and released on the EmArcy label. The album was Ferguson's first 12-inch LP and was released on CD compiled with Jam Session featuring Maynard Ferguson as Hollywood Jam Sessions in 2005.

== Reception ==
Professional ratings
Review scores
Source	Rating
Allmusic	3/5 stars
Allmusic	4.5/5 stars

Allmusic awarded the album 3 stars stating "Although the music contains no real surprises, this album has its exciting moments and will be enjoyed by bebop fans". The same reviewer rated Hollywood Jam Sessions 4½ stars stating "Hollywood Jam Sessions has some of Ferguson's most exciting performances from his Los Angeles years".

== Track listing ==
1. "Our Love is Here to Stay" (George Gershwin, Ira Gershwin) - 16:07
2. "Air Conditioned" (Maynard Ferguson) - 17:05

== Personnel ==
- Maynard Ferguson - trumpet, valve trombone
- Milt Bernhart - trombone
- Herb Geller - alto saxophone
- Bob Cooper - tenor saxophone
- Claude Williamson - piano
- John Simmons - bass
- Max Roach - drums
