= Maynard Ferguson Octet =

Studio album by Maynard Ferguson
- Released: 1955
- Recorded: April 25 & 27, 1955
- Studio: Capitol Studios, Los Angeles, California
- Genre: Jazz
- Length: 39:45
- Label: EmArcy; MG 36021

Maynard Ferguson chronology
Dimensions (1954-55)	Maynard Ferguson Octet (1955)	Around the Horn with Maynard Ferguson (1955)

Professional ratings
Review scores
Source	Rating
Allmusic	4.5/5 stars

Maynard Ferguson Octet is an album by Canadian jazz trumpeter/trombonist Maynard Ferguson featuring tracks recorded in 1955 and released on the EmArcy label.

== Reception ==
Allmusic awarded the album 4½ stars.

== Track listing ==
All compositions by Bill Holman except as indicated

1. "Finger Snappin'" - 3:55
2. "My New Flame 4:09
3. "Autumn Leaves" (Joseph Kosma, Jacques Prévert, Johnny Mercer) - 3:20
4. "Inter-Space" - 3:35
5. "20 Rue De Madrid" - 5:06
6. "Super-G" - 7:39
7. "What Was Her Name?" - 5:10
8. "Yeah" - 6:51
- Recorded at Capitol Studios in Los Angeles on April 25 (tracks 1–5) and April 27 (tracks 6–8), 1955

== Personnel ==
- Maynard Ferguson - trumpet, valve trombone, bass trombone
- Conte Candoli - trumpet
- Milt Bernhart - trombone
- Herb Geller - alto saxophone
- Georgie Auld - tenor saxophone
- Bob Gordon - baritone saxophone
- Ian Bernard - piano
- Red Callender - bass
- Shelly Manne - drums
- Bill Holman - arranger
