= Arranged/Played/Composed by Jack Montrose =

Studio album by Jack Montrose with Bob Gordon
- Released: 1955
- Recorded: May 11 & 12, 1955; Los Angeles, CA
- Genre: Jazz
- Length: 42:31
- Label: Atlantic; 1223
- Producer: Nesuhi Ertegun

Jack Montrose chronology
Arranged by Montrose (1954)	Arranged/Played/Composed by Jack Montrose (1955)	Jack Montrose Sextet (1955)

Arranged/Played/Composed by Jack Montrose is an album by saxophonist Jack Montrose, recorded in 1955 for Atlantic Records.

== Reception ==
Professional ratings
Review scores
Source	Rating
AllMusic	4/5 stars

A review for AllMusic by Al Campbell states: "Tenor saxophonist Montrose was from the West Coast school of cool jazz, and was significantly influenced by classical music. On this date he was thinking specifically about utilizing every instrument in structured chamber-esque arrangements. Montrose managed to achieve his goal of leading a swinging improvised jazz session without being restricted by this rigid structure."

== Track listing ==
All compositions by Jack Montrose except as indicated

1. "A Little Duet" - 5:01
2. "April's Fool" - 5:06
3. "Dot's Groovy" - 4:44
4. "I'm Gonna Move to the Outskirts of Town" (William Weldon, Andy Razaf) - 5:48
5. "Cecilia" (Dave Dreyer, Harry Ruby) - 4:37
6. "The News and the Weather" - 4:20
7. "When You Wish upon a Star" (Leigh Harline, Ned Washington) - 3:35
8. "Have You Met Miss Jones?" (Richard Rodgers, Lorenz Hart) - 5:17
9. "Paradox" - 4:03

== Personnel ==
- Jack Montrose - tenor saxophone, arranger
- Bob Gordon - baritone saxophone
- Paul Moer - piano
- Red Mitchell - bass
- Shelly Manne - drums
