= Dimensions (Maynard Ferguson album) =

Studio album by Maynard Ferguson
- Released: 1955
- Recorded: February 19 & 23, 1954 and August 26, 1955
- Studios: Capitol, 5515 Melrose, Hollywood; Radio Recorders, Los Angeles
- Genre: Jazz
- Labels: EmArcy; MG 36044

Maynard Ferguson chronology
Jam Session (1954)	Dimensions (1955)	Maynard Ferguson Octet (1955)

Dimensions is an album led by jazz trumpeter Maynard Ferguson featuring tracks recorded in early 1954 and mid-1955 and released on the EmArcy label.

== Reception ==
Professional ratings
Review scores
Source	Rating
AllMusic	3/5 stars

Billboard in 1955 wrote: "Ferguson plays a cleaner, more purposeful host than has generally been true in the past, in which ideas go volleying back and forth between him and saxophonist Bud Shank, Bob Cooper and Bob Gordon." AllMusic awarded the album 3 stars stating "Although not essential, the bop-oriented music is well-played and gives one a good taste of early Ferguson".

== Track listing ==
1. "Egad, Martha" (Bill Holman) - 3:50
2. "Breakfast Dance" (Holman) - 4:00
3. "Maiden Voyage" (Willie Maiden) - 2:56
4. "Thou Swell" (Richard Rodgers Lorenz Hart) - 2:50
5. "The Way You Look Tonight" (Dorothy Fields, Jerome Kern) - 2:50
6. "All God's Children Got Rhythm" (Bronislaw Kaper, Walter Jurmann, Gus Kahn) - 2:49
7. "Slow Stroll" (Holman) - 2:40
8. "Wonder Why" (Nicholas Brodzsky, Sammy Cahn) - 3:27
9. "Willie Nillie" (Maiden) - 2:41
10. "Hymm to Her" (Maiden) - 2:14
11. "Lonely Town" (Betty Comden, Adolph Green, Leonard Bernstein) - 2:56
12. "Somewhere Over the Rainbow" (Yip Harburg, Harold Arlen) - 3:00
- Recorded at Radio Recorders in Los Angeles on February 19, 1954 (tracks 3–6 & 9), and at Capitol Studios in Los Angeles on February 23, 1954 (tracks 10–12) and August 26, 1955 (tracks 1, 2, 7 & 8)

== Personnel ==
- Maynard Ferguson - trumpet, valve trombone, bass trombone
- Conte Candoli - trumpet (tracks 1, 2, 7 & 8)
- Milt Bernhart (tracks 1, 2, 7 & 8), Herbie Harper (tracks 3–6 & 9–12) - trombone
- Herb Geller - alto saxophone (tracks 1, 2, 7 & 8)
- Bud Shank - alto saxophone, flute (tracks 3–6 & 9–12)
- Bob Cooper (tracks 3–6 & 9–12), Nino Tempo (tracks 1, 2, 7, & 8) - tenor saxophone
- Bob Gordon - baritone saxophone
- Ian Bernard (tracks 1, 2, 7 & 8), Russ Freeman (tracks 3–6 & 9–12) - piano
- Curtis Counce (Tracks 3–6 & 9–12), Red Mitchell (tracks 1, 2, 7 & 8) - bass
- Gary Frommer (tracks 1, 2, 7 & 8), Shelly Manne (tracks 3–6 & 9–12) - drums
- Bill Holman (tracks 1, 2, 7 & 8), Willie Maiden (tracks 3–6 & 9–12) - arranger
