= Evildoers Beware! =

Studio album by Mustard Plug
- Released: March 18, 1997
- Recorded: The Blasting Room, Ft. Collins, CO
- Genre: Ska punk
- Length: 37:55
- Label: Hopeless Records
- Producer: Bill Stevenson and Stephen Egerton

Mustard Plug chronology
Big Daddy Multitude (1993)	Evildoers Beware! (1997)	Pray for Mojo (1999)

Professional ratings
Review scores
Source	Rating
AllMusic	4/5 stars
Sputnikmusic	4/5
Visions	7/12
Ox-Fanzine	

Evildoers Beware! is the third album by Mustard Plug. It was released in March 1997 by Hopeless Records on CD, LP, and cassette. The album sold 90,000 copies as of 2007. Music from the album was featured in the 2001 video game Sunny Garcia Surfing.

== Track listing ==
1. “Box” – 3:24
2. “Suburban Homesick Blues” – 3:05
3. “Never Be” – 2:46
4. “You” – 3:59
5. “Mendoza” – 2:48
6. “Go” – 2:08
7. “Jerry” – 3:51
8. “Not Again” – 3:18
9. “Miss Michigan” – 2:55
10. “Sadie May” – 3:01
11. “Dressed Up” – 3:00
12. “Beer (Song)” – 3:40

== Personnel ==
- Colin Clive – Guitar and Vocals
- Craig DeYoung – Bass
- Brandon Jenison – Trumpet
- David Kirchgessner – Vocals
- Nick Varano – Drums

=== Additional musicians ===
- Kevin "Ray" Dixon – tenor saxophone
- Bleu VanDyke – trombone
- Jim Hofer – trombone
- Mark Petz – tenor saxophone
