= Masterpieces: 1991–2002 =

Greatest hits album by Mustard Plug
- Released: September 6, 2005
- Genre: Ska punk
- Label: Hopeless Records

Mustard Plug chronology
Yellow #5 (2002)	Masterpieces: 1991–2002 (2005)	In Black and White (2007)

Professional ratings
Review scores
Source	Rating
AllMusic	4/5 stars
Punknews.org	4/5 stars

Masterpieces: 1991–2002 is a greatest hits album released in September 2005 by Mustard Plug. It combines old songs with new recordings, without the use of a digital audio workstation. During the band's split up, they recorded this with some of their past members.

== Track listing ==
1. "Beer (Song)" from Evildoers Beware
2. "Not Enough" from Yellow No. 5
3. "Someday, Right Now" from Pray for Mojo
4. "Mr. Smiley" from Big Daddy Multitude
5. "Lolita" from Pray for Mojo
6. "Go" from Evildoers Beware
7. "Just A Minute" from Yellow No. 5
8. "Throw A Bomb" from Pray for Mojo
9. "You" from Evildoers Beware
10. "Brain On Ska" from Skapocalypse Now
11. "In Your Face" from Yellow No. 5
12. "Everything Girl" from Pray for Mojo
13. "Box" from Evildoers Beware
14. "Yesterday" from Pray for Mojo
15. "Skank By Numbers" from Big Daddy Multitude
16. "Safe" from Yellow No. 5
17. "Mendoza" from Evildoers Beware
18. "We're Gunna Take On The World" from Pray for Mojo
19. "Thigh High Nylons" from Big Daddy Multitude

You (video ) Everything Girl (video)
