= Mustard Plug =

American ska punk band

- Origin: Grand Rapids, Michigan, United States
- Genres: Ska punk, pop punk
- Years active: Since 1991
- Labels: Hopeless, No Idea Records, Bad Time Records
- Members: Dave Kirchgessner; Brandon Jenison; Jim Hofer; Micheal Skowron; Colin Clive; Mark Petz; Greg Witulski
- Past members: Rick Johnson; Bleu VanDyke; Michael Skowron; Craig DeYoung; Nick Varano; Bob Kneisel; Kevin Dixon; Brad Rozier; John Massel; Matt Van; Brandon Power; Mike McKendrick
- Website: www.mustardplug.com

Mustard Plug is an American ska punk band from Grand Rapids, Michigan, consisting of Dave Kirchgessner (vocals), Brandon Jenison (trumpet), Jim Hofer (trombone), Nate Cohn (drums), Colin Clive (guitar/vocals), Mark Petz (tenor saxophone) and Greg Witulski (bass).

Formed in 1991, the band has regularly toured throughout the United States, Europe, Japan, and South America. They have toured with the Warped Tour twice, and participated in the Ska Against Racism Tour. As of 2024, the band has released eight studio albums and continues to tour actively.

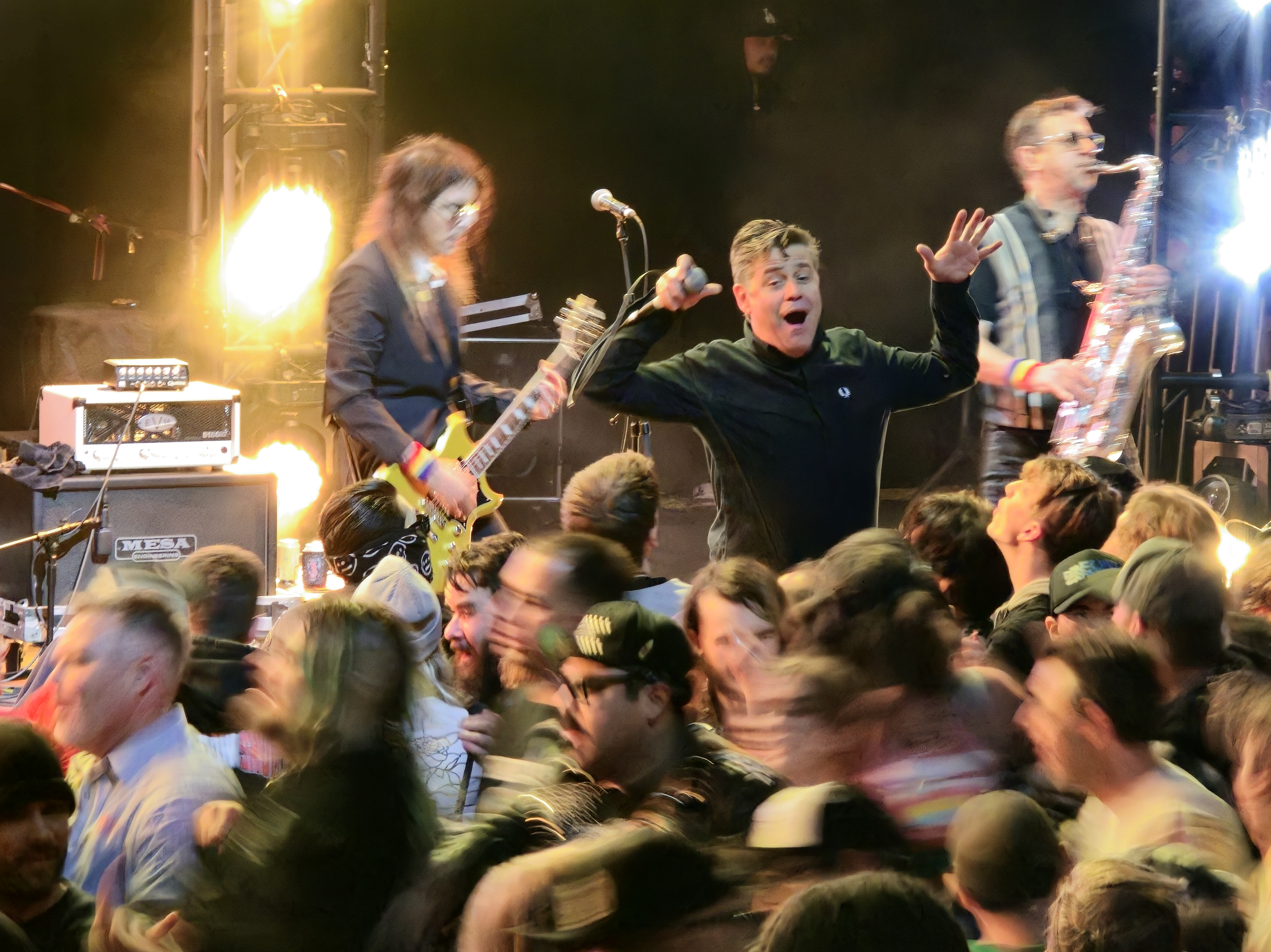
Lead Singer of Mustard Plug performing at Garden AMP (Jan 18 2025)

Explaining the band's goal, Jim Hofer said, "We may have some messages in our music, but essentially we just do this because we love it and we want people to lighten up and have fun."

== History ==
The band formed in 1991 after Colin and Dave both attended a Special Beat show. The band's original members were Dave Kirchgessner, Mike McKendrick, Colin Clive, and Anthony Vilchez. There was virtually no ska scene in Grand Rapids at the time, so Mustard Plug was able to develop a unique sound and draw a large following.

Brandon Jenison stated in an interview that their band name originated when "a guy in the early stages of the band was making a sandwich and that crusty stuff that forms on the mustard bottle when you put it in the fridge without wiping it off first gave him an interesting idea for a name."

In 2002, the band released Yellow #5, and supported the album for years on tour. In 2005, they released the "greatest hits" album Masterpieces: 1991–2002.

Mustard Plug was on the label Hopeless Records for many years, but had a period of free agency until their signing with Bad Time Records.

The band celebrated their 20th anniversary in 2011 with a national tour.

In 2012, the band had an idea for a live album called Mustard Plug:Live!, but canceled in favor of their 2014 album Can't Contain It, the recording of which was funded via Kickstarter. The album features cover art by Jeff Rosenstock of Bomb the Music Industry.

In May 2017, the band performed at Pouzza Fest in Montreal. In 2019, they embarked on a tour of Japan. The band continues to perform around the United States on a regular basis. In 2021, long-time bassist Rick Johnson left the group.

On September 8, 2023, the band released Where Did All My Friends Go?, their first studio album in 9 years, on label Bad Time Records.

== Line-up ==
- Dave Kirchgessner - lead vocals (since 1991)
- Colin Clive - guitar, vocals (since 1991)
- Nathan Cohn - drums (since 2005)
- Brandon Jenison - trumpet, backing vocals (since 1994)
- Jim Hofer - trombone (since 1994)
- Mark Petz - tenor saxophone (1993–1998; since 2021)
- Greg Witulski - bass (since 2021)

=== Past members ===
- Rick Johnson - bass (2004–2021)
- Anthony Vilchez - bass (1991–1994)
- Craig DeYoung - bass (1994–2001), alto saxophone (1992–1994)
- Matt Van - bass (2001–2004)
- Mike McKendrick - drums (1991–1993)
- Michael Skowron - trombone (1993-1995), tenor saxophone (1993-1995)
- Nick Varano - drums (1993–1999)
- Brad Rozier - drums (1999–2004)
- John Massel - drums (2004-2005)
- Bob Engelsman - trombone (1992–1994)
- Bleu VanDyke - trombone (1995–1998)
- Kevin Dixon - tenor saxophone (1996–1998)

== Discography ==
=== Albums ===
- Skapocalypse Now! (1992, Dashiki Clout)
- Big Daddy Multitude (1993, Asbestos Records)
- Evildoers Beware! (1997, Hopeless Records)
- Pray for Mojo (1999, Hopeless Records)
- Yellow No. 5 (2002, Hopeless Records)
- Masterpieces: 1991-2002 (2005, Hopeless Records)
- In Black and White (2007, Hopeless Records)
- Can't Contain It (2014, No Idea Records)
- Where Did All My Friends Go? (2023, Bad Time Records)

=== EPs ===
- Hey! (2024, Dashiki Clout Records)

=== Music videos ===
- Summertime (1992)
- Mr. Smiley (1993)
- Beer (song) (1995)
- You (1997)
- Everything Girl (1999)
- Hit Me! Hit Me! (2007)
- Over the Edge (2007)
- Fall Apart (2023)
- Vampire (2023)
- Doin' What We Do (2023)
- Where Did All My Friends Go? (2023)
- Why Does it Have To Be So Hard? (2023)

=== Hopeless Records compilation appearances ===
- Lolita and Never Be appear on Hopelessly Devoted to You, Vol. II (1998)
- Yesterday and Already Gone appear on Hopelessly Devoted to You, Vol. 3 (2000)
- Away from Here and Not Enough appear on Hopelessly Devoted to You, Vol. 4 (2002)
- You and Over the Edge appear on Hopelessly Devoted to You, Vol. 6 (2006)
