= Blues and Vanilla =

Studio album by Jack Montrose Quintet with Red Norvo
- Released: 1957
- Recorded: November 13 and December 24, 1956; Radio Recorders, Los Angeles, CA
- Genre: Jazz
- Label: RCA Victor; LPM-1451
- Producer: Shorty Rogers

Jack Montrose chronology
Jack Montrose Sextet (1955)	Blues and Vanilla (1957)	The Horn's Full (1956)

Blues and Vanilla is an album by saxophonist Jack Montrose's Quintet with Red Norvo recorded in 1956 for the RCA Victor label.

== Reception ==
Professional ratings
Review scores
Source	Rating
AllMusic	3/5 stars
Disc	4/5 stars

AllMusic rated the album with 3 stars; in his review, Ken Dryden states: "The cool-toned nature of the tenor saxophonist's compositions and arrangements fits in with the so-called West Coast jazz genre, though like many of the musicians labeled as such, Montrose is not a native of the region".

== Track listing ==
All compositions by Jack Montrose except as indicated

1. "Concertina da Camera (Blues and Vanilla)" - 18:30
2. "Bockhanal" - 3:44
3. "Don't Get Around Much Anymore" (Duke Ellington, Bob Russell) - 5:48
4. "Bernie's Tune" (Bernie Miller) - 3:19
5. "For the Fairest" - 3:36
6. "A Dandy Line" - 2:50

== Personnel ==
- Jack Montrose - tenor saxophone, arranger
- Red Norvo - vibraphone
- Jim Hall - guitar (tracks 2–6)
- Max Bennett (tracks 2–6), Walter "Buddy" Clark (track 1) - bass
- Bill Dolney (tracks 2–6), Shelly Manne (track 1) - drums
- Joe Maini - alto saxophone (track 1)
