= Buchanan Brothers =

Country artists

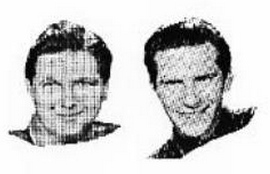
The Buchanan Brothers

The Buchanan Brothers were two brothers, Chester (born July 28, 1924, died December 5, 1992), and Lester Buchanan (born April 9, 1920, died August 6, 2005), who recorded country music during the 1940s on the RCA Victor label. Their biggest hit, Atomic Power, reached #6 on Billboard's "Most Played Juke Box Folk Records" chart in July 1946; the song was also featured in the 1982 movie The Atomic Café. Another song, 1947's "(When You See) Those Flying Saucers", was used in the opening scene of the 2009 animated release Monsters vs. Aliens.

Their releases were under two different artist names: "The Buchanan Brothers (Chester and Lester) Singing with Orchestra" and "Buchanan Brothers and the Georgia Catamounts".

They are not to be confused with the pop-rock trio by the same name from the late 1960s, which included Terry Cashman, Gene Pistilli, and Tommy West.

== Discography ==
Catalog number	Title	Date Recorded	Serial number
20-2553B	The Heartsick Blues	August 22, 1944	D7-VB-1294-1A
20-3045A	Don't Dog Me 'Round!	August 22, 1944	D7-VB-1295-1A
20-2743A	High Tempered Mama	September 29, 1944	D7-VB-1297-1A
20-3191A	Hootin – Nanny Papa	September 29, 1944	D7-VB-1296-1A
20-2129A/33-0523A	Mama, I'm Sick	December 20, 1944	D4-AB-492-1A
20-2129B/33-0536B	Blow, Forty Seven, Blow	December 20, 1944	D4-AB-494-1A
33-0523B	I Got Worries	December 20, 1944	D4-VB-493-1A
33-0536A	Them Good Old Times are Comin' Back Again	December 20, 1944	D4-AB-491-1A
33-0531A	Colin Kelly, Will You Tell the Boys Up Yonder	June 19, 1945	D5-AB-419-1A
33-0531B	Troubles in my Heart	June 19, 1945	D5-AB-420-1A
33-0541A	Hurry, Johnny, Hurry	June 19, 1945	D5-AB-421-1A
33-0541B	The Bottom Fell Out of the Sky	June 19, 1945	D5-AB-418-1A
20-1953B	(When I Put On My) Long White Robe	November 27, 1945	D5-AB-965-1A
20-2106A	Am I Still P-A-R-T of Your H-E-A-R-T	November 27, 1945	D5-AB-964-1A
20-2264B	My Little Boy Blue	November 27, 1945	D5-AB-963-1A
20-2891B	Would You Cry?	November 27, 1945	D5-AB-962-1A
20-1850A	Atomic Power	March 19, 1946	D6-VB-1357-1A
20-1850B	Singing an Old Hymn	March 19, 1946	D6-VB-1358-1A
20-2264A	(Don't Cry) My Coney Island Baby	March 19, 1946	D6-VB-1359-1A
20-3191B	Then You'll Be the One to Cry	March 19, 1946	D6-VB-1356-1A
20-1953A	Shut That Gate	August 7, 1946	D6-VB-2623-1A
20-2106B	Left by the Wayside	August 7, 1946	D6-VB-2626-1A
20-2743B	Just Hangin' On	August 7, 1946	D6-VB-2625-1A
20-3045B	You'll Never Take Away My Dreams	August 7, 1946	D6-VB-2624-1A
20-2385A	(When You See) Those Flying Saucers	July 16, 1947	D7-VB-1290-1A
20-2385B	The Silver Meteor	July 16, 1947	D7-VB-1291-1A
20-2553A	There is a Power Greater Than Atomic	July 16, 1947	D7-VB-1292-1A
20-2891A	The Steam That Blows the Whistle (Never Turns the Wheel)	July 16, 1947	D7-VB-1293-1A

== Personnel ==
- August 22, 1944: Violin/Leader: Mac Ceppos; Guitar: Tony Gottuso & Lester Buchanan; Mandolin: Chester Buchanan; Accordion: Edwin Smith; Bass: Julie M. Bedra.
- September 29, 1944: Violin/Leader: Mac Ceppos; Guitar: Lester Buchanan & Tony Gottuso; Mandolin: Chester Buchanan; Accordion: Edwin Smith; Bass: Sol Braun; Piano: Bob Miller.
- December 20, 1944: New York Studio No. 1; Time: Orchestra (9:30 to 12:30), Studio (9:00 to 1:00), (EK-9:00 to 11:00), (JM-11:00 to 1:00); Miss Van Sciver and Mr. Bob Miller present. Leader & Violin: Mac Ceppos; Guitar: Tony Gatusso & Lester Buchanan; Mandolin: Chester Buchanan; Bass Violin: Lester Braun.
- June 19, 1945: New York Studio No. 2; Bob Miller present; Union Musicians Used; Time: 9:00 to 12:00; Violin/Leader: Mac Ceppos; Trumpet: William A. Graham; Bass Violin: Lester Braun; Steel Guitar: Samuel Persoff; Violin: Edward Asherman; Electric Guitar & Clarinet: Edwin H. Grosso.
- November 27, 1945: A & R Rep: Mr. S.H. Sholes; Studio: New York No. 1; Union Musicians Used; Time: 7:30 P.M. to 10:30 P.M.; Violin/Leader: Mac Ceppos; Violin: Val Olman; Bass: Lester Braun; Trumpet: George Erwin; Guitar: Anthony Gottuso; Guitar: Andy Sannella; Piano: Bob Miller.
- March 19, 1946: A & R Rep: Messers. Sholes and Case; Studio: New York No. 2; Union Musicians Used; Time: 9:30 to 12:30; Violin/Leader: Bertrand Hirsch; Violin: Samuel Raitz; Guitar: Arthur S. Ryerson Jr.; Clarinet: Sal Franzella; Bass: William Feinbloom; Steel Guitar: Ed. McMullen; Drums: Chauncey Morehouse.
- August 7, 1946: A & R Rep: Mr. S.H. Sholes; Studio: New York No. 1; Union Musicians Used; Time: 5:30 P.M. to 9:00 (plus 1 hr. set up); Leader/Violin: Bertrand Hirsch; Violin: Edward O. South; Sax: Sal Franzella; Bass: Lester Braun; Trumpet: Henry Lewis; Guitar: Anthony Gottuso & Vincent Maffei; Piano: Nick Tagg; Drums: Jack Saunders.
- July 16, 1947: A & R Rep: Messrs S. Sholes & C. Grean; Studio: New York No. 2; Union Musicians Used; Time: 1:30 P.M. to 4:30 P.M.; Guitar: Lester Buchanan; Mandolin: Chester Buchanan; Electric Guitar: Edwin Grosso; Guitar: Arthur Ryerson; Bass: Charles Grean.
