= Skapocalypse Now! =

Studio album by Mustard Plug
- Released: October 30, 1992
- Recorded: August–September 1992 (Fast Trax, Jenison MI)
- Genre: Ska
- Label: Dashiki Clout
- Producer: Scott Carver

Mustard Plug chronology
Skapocalypse Now! (1992)	Big Daddy Multitude (1993)

Skapocalypse Now! is the debut album by ska band Mustard Plug. It was released in October 1992 on singer Dave Kirchgessner's own label, Dashiki Clout. After requests for the tape grew, Hopeless Records re-released Skapocalypse Now! in 1998 on CD for mail order, direct to store and concert sales. Along with the original songs, other live and studio bonus tracks were added.

== Track listing ==
Side One

1. "Brain on Ska"
2. "Alone"
3. "Summertime"
4. "Sweet Potato"
5. "We Want the Mustard"
6. "To Be"

Side Two

7. "Kill the Governor"
8. "Simon Says"
9. "Butcher's Mop"
10. "7–11 Man"

CD bonus tracks

11. "Thigh High Nylons (Alternate Take)"
12. "Escape (Skapocalypse Now! Reject)"
13. "(Blank)"
14. "Skank By Numbers (Live)"
15. "Battle of the Rude (Live)"
16. "Betty (Live)"

This album was originally released on cassette only in 1992, and converted for a CD reissue in 1998, with the licensing rights of Hopeless Records and Dashiki Clout records.
