= Blues Cross Country =

Studio album by Peggy Lee
- Released: January 1962
- Recorded: 1962
- Genre: Vocal jazz
- Length: 36:24
- Label: Capitol ST 1671
- Producer: Dave Cavanaugh

Peggy Lee chronology
If You Go (1961)	Blues Cross Country (1962)	Bewitching-Lee (1962)

Blues Cross Country is a 1962 studio album by the American singer and songwriter Peggy Lee, principally arranged by Quincy Jones, with some arrangements by Benny Carter. The album can be described as a concept album, consisting of a musical journey across the United States through swinging blues songs, many of which were written by Lee with other contributors.

Blues Cross Country was the second of Lee's two albums featuring arrangements by Jones. He had also arranged her previous studio album, If You Go (1961).

== Critical reception ==
Professional ratings
Review scores
Source	Rating
AllMusic	4/5 stars

Blues Cross Country received good reviews at the time of its release from both Billboard magazine in March 1962, and Time magazine in May 1962. Billboard wrote that "Peggy's back, and this time in a blues mood—with sad blues, happy blues and swinging blues. She sings them in her own delightful style aided muchly by the fine arrangements of ork [sic] leader Quincy Jones. ... The album's a gas".

The AllMusic review by William Ruhlmann awarded the album four stars and commented that "Though Jones' arrangements are often a touch brassier than the blues standards can handle, Lee contributes just the right blend of vigor and feeling to the songs"

== Track listing ==
1. "Kansas City" (Jerry Leiber, Mike Stoller) – 2:29
2. "Basin Street Blues" (Spencer Williams) – 3:04
3. "Los Angeles Blues" (Peggy Lee, Quincy Jones) – 2:38
4. "I Lost My Sugar in Salt Lake City" (Johnny Lange, Leon Rene) – 2:53
5. "The Grain Belt Blues" (Lee, Milt Raskin, Bill Schugler) – 1:52
6. "New York City Blues" (Jones, Lee) – 3:21
7. "Goin' to Chicago Blues" (Count Basie, Jimmy Rushing) – 2:37
8. "San Francisco Blues" (Lee, Raskin) – 2:37
9. "Fisherman's Wharf" (Lee, Raskin) – 3:11
10. "Boston Beans" (Lee, Raskin, Schugler) – 2:05
11. "The Train Blues" (Jones, Lee) – 2:42
12. "Saint Louis Blues" (W. C. Handy) – 2:15

Bonus tracks issued on the 1999 CD release

13. "Hey, Look Me Over" (Cy Coleman, Carolyn Leigh) – 1:55
14. "The Shining Sea" (Lee, Johnny Mandel) – 2:45

== Personnel ==
- Peggy Lee – vocals
- Quincy Jones – arranger, conductor
- Benny Carter – arranger ("San Francisco Blues"), alto saxophone, tuba
- Johnny Mandel – arranger ("The Shining Sea")
- Stan Levey, Earl Palmer – drums
- Max Bennett - bass
- Chico Guerrero – congas, percussion
- Aubrey Bouck, Bill Henshaw, Sinclair Lott, Henry Sigismonti – French horn
- Frank Strazzeri – piano
- Jimmy Rowles – piano
- Bob Cooper, Harry Klee, Bud Shank – woodwind
- Bill Green, Plas Johnson, Bill Perkins – alto saxophone, tenor saxophone
- Jack Sheldon – trumpet
- Bob Bain, Dennis Budimir, John Pisano, Howard Roberts, Toots Thielemans – guitar
- Artie Kane – organ
- Larry Bunker, Emil Richards – percussion
- Lou Levy – piano
- Jack Nimitz – baritone saxophone
- Buddy Collette – alto saxophone, tenor saxophone
- Justin Gordon – tenor saxophone
- Hoyt Bohannon, Vern Friley, Bobby Knight, Lew McCreary, Dick Nash, George Roberts, Frank Rosolino, Tommy Shepard – trombone
- Pete Candoli, Bob Fowler, Conrad Gozzo, Joe Graves, Al Porcino, Ray Triscari – trumpet
