= In Black and White (Mustard Plug album) =

Studio album by Mustard Plug
- Released: September 11, 2007
- Genre: Ska punk
- Length: 32:34
- Label: Hopeless
- Producer: Bill Stevenson

Mustard Plug chronology
Masterpieces: 1991–2002 (2005)	In Black and White (2007)	Can't Contain It (2014)

Professional ratings
Review scores
Source	Rating
About.com	link
Absolutepunk.net	85% link
Punknews	link
Allmusic	link
The Hub	link

In Black and White is the sixth album by Mustard Plug.

== Background and production ==
On June 29, 2006, a music video was released for "Over the Edge". In October 2006, the band toured the US with labelmates Against All Authority, leading up to an appearance at Riot Fest. On November 8, 2006, "Puddle of Blood" was posted on Mustard Plug's Myspace account. In November and December 2006, they went on the UK leg of the Ska Is Dead tour alongside the Planet Smashers and Bomb the Music Industry!. They closed out the year with four holiday shows in the US Midwest. Following this, the band recorded their next album with producer Bill Stevenson in early 2007.

The title is a play on the Cheap Trick record In Color. The album is somewhat darker than Mustard Plug's previous work. Bassist Rick Johnson attributes this to the sorry state of affairs in the US: "Not just the war but, the whole way government has turned in the past twenty years. Things seem pretty bleak and I think that feeling had a lot to do with the writing of the record."

== Release ==
Mustard Plug played a handful of shows in March and April 2007, prior to a short tour in May 2007 with Buck-O-Nine. On July 9, 2007, In Black and White was announced for release in two months' time; alongside this, the track listing and artwork was posted online. "Hit Me! Hit Me!" was made available for streaming via the group's Myspace on August 8, 2007. It was followed by "Time to Wake Up" on August 14, 2007, which was made available for streaming via the website Punknews.org. Three days later, a music video was released for "Hit Me! Hit Me!". On August 21, 2007, "Who Benefits?" was also shared via Punknews.org. They performed at the Ska Weekend festival in Tennessee and the International Ska Circus in Las Vegas, Nevada. In Black and White was released through Hopeless Records on September 11, 2007; it was promotedwith four releases shows in the Midwestern US with Mu330, Whole Wheat Bread, Westbound Train, and the Flaming Tsunamis. In October 2007, the band on an East Coast US tour with Voodoo Glow Skulls and Left Alone. In April and May 2008, the band went on a West Coast tour with Voodoo Glow Skulls, Knock-Out, and Random Hand, which was followed by a series of East Coast shows with Less Than Jake and Suburban Legends. They then appeared at the Riot Fest and Skanksgiving festivals in October and November 2008, respectively, in addition to touring with Bomb the Music Industry!. The band appeared on a handful of dates of the Ska Is Dead tour in January 2009.

== Track listing ==
1. "Who Benefits?" – 2:46
2. "Over the Edge" – 2:19
3. "Hit Me! Hit Me!" – 2:09
4. "Time to Wake Up" – 3:02
5. "Something New" – 1:46
6. "You Can't Go Back" – 0:47
7. "Life Is Too Short" – 2:46
8. "Copasetic" – 2:32
9. "On and On" – 2:17
10. "Tell Me" – 1:56
11. "Puddle of Blood" – 3:45
12. "Real Rat Bastard" – 3:16
13. "What You Say" – 3:13
