= Joe Maini =

American jazz alto saxophonist

Joe Maini (February 8, 1930 – May 7, 1964) was an American jazz alto saxophonist.

Maini was born February 8, 1930, in Providence, Rhode Island. Early in his career Maini played in the big bands of Alvino Rey, Johnny Bothwell, and Claude Thornhill (1951). In the early 1950s he moved to Los Angeles, where he found work as a session musician and continued working in big bands, usually holding the lead alto chair. Some of the leaders he worked with were Terry Gibbs, Onzy Matthews, Gerald Wilson, Bill Holman, Louis Bellson, Dan Terry, and Shelly Manne. He recorded in small group settings with Clifford Brown and Max Roach (1954), Zoot Sims (1956), Jack Sheldon, Conte Candoli, Red Mitchell, Lin Halliday, Kenny Drew, and Jimmy Knepper. He also worked with his close friend, comedian Lenny Bruce.

Maini died May 7, 1964, at age 34 in Los Angeles, California. Accounts of his death usually state that Maini died playing Russian roulette, though his family and several witnesses contend that it was the result of a firearms accident.

Forty-four years after Maini's death, Lone Hill Jazz issued a four-CD set with many of his small group recordings.

== Discography ==
=== As leader ===
- The Small Group Recordings (Lone Hill Jazz, 2008)

=== As sideman ===
With Louis Bellson

- Big Band Jazz from the Summit (Roulette, 1962)
- Small Band Sessions (Fresh Sound, 1962)
- Big Band Jazz From the Summit (Fresh Sound, 1962)

With Clifford Brown

- Best Coast Jazz (Emarcy, 1954)
- Clifford Brown All Stars (Emarcy, rec. 1954, released 1956)

With Kenny Drew

- Talkin' & Walkin' (Jazz:West, 1955)

With Terry Gibbs

- More Vibes on Velvet (Mercury, 1958)
- Launching a New Sound in Music (Mercury, 1959)
- Swing Is Here (Verve, 1960)
- The Exciting Terry Gibbs Big Band (Verve, 1961) reissued as Dream Band Vol. 4, Main Stem (Contemporary, 1990)
- Explosion! (Mercury, 1961) reissued as Dream Band Vol. 5, The Big Cat (Contemporary, 1991)
- Dream Band (Contemporary - rec. 1959, released 1986)
- Dream Band, Vol. 2 (Contemporary - rec. 1959, released 1987)
- Dream Band, Vol. 3, Flying Home (Contemporary - rec. 1959, released 1988)
- Dream Band. Vol. 6, One More Time (Contemporary - rec. 1959, released 2002)

With Bill Holman

- Bill Holman's Great Big Band (Capitol, 1962)

With Johnny Mandel

- I Want to Live (United Artists, 1958)

With Shelly Manne

- The West Coast Sound (Contemporary, 1954)

With Red Mitchell

- Red Mitchell (Bethlehem, 1955)

With Jack Montrose

- Blues and Vanilla (RCA Victor, 1956)

With Mark Murphy

- Playing the Field (Capitol, 1960)

With Gerald Wilson

- You Better Believe It! (Pacific Jazz, 1961)
- Moment of Truth (Pacific Jazz, 1962)
- Portraits (Pacific Jazz, 1963/64)
- The Complete Pacific Jazz Recordings of Gerald Wilson and His Orchestra (Mosaic, 2000)
