= Pray for Mojo =

Studio album by Mustard Plug
- Released: March 16, 1999
- Recorded: January 1999 (at The Blasting Room, Fort Collins, Colorado.)
- Genre: Ska
- Length: 32:59
- Label: Hopeless Records
- Producer: Bill Stevenson; Stephen Egerton; Jason Livermore

Mustard Plug chronology
Evildoers Beware! (1997)	Pray for Mojo (1999)	Yellow #5 (2002)

Professional ratings
Review scores
Source	Rating
AllMusic	3.5/5 stars
PopMatters	6.8/10

Pray for Mojo is a 1999 album by the American ska punk band Mustard Plug. The title comes from an episode of The Simpsons, "Girly Edition", which first aired in April 1998.

== Critical reception ==
AllMusic wrote that "what makes this ska core group special is the fabulous horn section of trumpeter Brandon Jenison and trombonist Jim Hofer." The New Haven Register called the album "pop with sharp enough hooks and plenty of enthusiasm, and maybe a little bit of maturity..."

== Track listing ==
1. Send You Back – 2:11
2. Not Giving In – 2:45
3. Someday, Right Now – 3:25
4. Everything Girl – 3:05
5. Away from Here – 3:27
6. Throw a Bomb – 2:27
7. Lolita – 2:51
8. Mend Your Ways – 2:19
9. So Far to Go – 2:11
10. Time Will Come – 2:58
11. Yesterday – 3:10
12. We’re Gonna Take on the World – 2:10
