= Can't Contain It =

Studio album by Mustard Plug
- Released: January 14, 2014
- Genre: Ska punk
- Label: No Idea Records

Mustard Plug chronology
| In Black and White (2007) | Can't Contain It (2014) | Where Did All My Friends Go? (2023) |

Professional ratings
Review scores
| Source | Rating |
|---|---|
| Punknews.org | 4/5 stars |

Can't Contain It is the seventh album by Mustard Plug. It was released in January 2014.

Dave Kirchgessner stated that the album "is strong evolution in our sound and our art while still staying true to the goal of playing party music for punk rockers." The album features guest appearances by Dan Potthast of MU330 and Sean Bonnette of AJJ.

== Track listing ==
1. "We Came to Party"
2. "The All-Nighter"
3. "Aye Aye Aye"
4. "White Noise"
5. "Bang!"
6. "Burn It Down"
7. "Shakin' It Up"
8. "Blame Yourself"
9. "Gone and Faded"
10. "What Does She Know?"
11. "Twist the Knife"
12. "It's You"
13. "The Perfect Plan"
14. "Running Out of Time"
