= The Horn's Full =

Studio album by Jack Montrose and All-Stars
- Released: 1958
- Recorded: September 10 & 11, 1957; Radio Recorders, Los Angeles, California
- Genre: Jazz
- Label: RCA Victor; LPM-1572
- Producer: Shorty Rogers

Jack Montrose chronology
Blues and Vanilla (1956)	The Horn's Full (1958)	Spread a Little Joy (1987)

The Horn's Full is an album by saxophonist Jack Montrose's Quintet with Red Norvo recorded in 1957 for the RCA Victor label.

== Reception ==
Professional ratings
Review scores
Source	Rating
AllMusic	3/5 stars

AllMusic rated the album with 3 stars; in his review Scott Yanow states: "The music is greatly uplifted by Montrose's inventive arrangements and has many concise solos. Despite the quality, Montrose would not have his next opportunity to lead a record date for 28 years".

== Track listing ==
All compositions by Jack Montrose except as indicated

1. "Rosanne" (Edna Osser, Glenn Osser) - 3:14
2. "Polka Dots and Moonbeams" (Jimmy Van Heusen, Johnny Burke) - 5:03
3. "The Little House" - 3:01
4. "Dark Angel" - 5:07
5. "Solid Citizen" - 3:24
6. "Goody Goody" (Matty Malneck, Johnny Mercer) - 2:46
7. "Do Nothing till You Hear from Me" (Duke Ellington, Bob Russell) - 2:56
8. "True Blue" - 3:28
9. "The Horn's Full" - 2:42
10. "Crazy She Calls Me" (Carl Sigman, Russell) - 5:46
11. "Headline" - 3:15

== Personnel ==
- Jack Montrose - tenor saxophone, arranger
- Red Norvo - vibraphone
- Jim Hall - guitar (tracks 4, 10, 11); Barney Kessel - guitar (tracks 1–3, 5–9)
- Max Bennett - bass (tracks 4, 10, 11); Red Wootten - bass (tracks 1–3, 5–9)
- Bill Dolney - drums (tracks 4, 10, 11); Mel Lewis - drums (tracks 1–3, 5–9)
