= Jack Montrose Sextet =

Studio album by Jack Montrose Sextet
- Released: 1955
- Recorded: June 24 & July 6, 1955; Los Angeles, CA
- Genre: Jazz
- Label: Pacific Jazz; PJ 1208
- Producer: Richard Bock

Jack Montrose chronology
Arranged/Played/Composed by Jack Montrose (1955)	Jack Montrose Sextet (1955)	Blues and Vanilla (1956)

Jack Montrose Sextet is an album by saxophonist Jack Montrose, recorded in 1955 for the Pacific Jazz label.

== Reception ==
Professional ratings
Review scores
Source	Rating
AllMusic	4.5/5 stars

The AllMusic reviewer, Scott Yanow, states: "Montrose's charts (which are full of unexpected surprises while always swinging and leaving room for plenty of solos) are quite notable and show that, despite the restrained tones, there was plenty of excitement to be found in West Coast jazz".

== Track listing ==
All compositions by Jack Montrose except as indicated

1. "Listen Hear" - 5:32
2. "Bewitched, Bothered and Bewildered" (Richard Rodgers, Lorenz Hart) - 5:26
3. "Some Good Fun Blues" - 5:06
4. "Fools Rush In" (Rube Bloom, Johnny Mercer) - 5:33
5. "Speakeasy" - 4:11
6. "Credo" - 5:24
7. "Pretty" - 5:16
8. "That Old Feeling" (Sammy Fain, Lew Brown) - 4:27

== Personnel ==
- Jack Montrose - tenor saxophone, arranger
- Conte Candoli - trumpet
- Bob Gordon - baritone saxophone
- Paul Moer - piano
- Ralph Pena - bass
- Shelly Manne - drums
