= Best Coast Jazz =

Studio album by Clifford Brown
- Released: 1956
- Recorded: August 11, 1954
- Studios: Capitol, 5515 Melrose, Hollywood
- Genre: Jazz
- Length: 36:58
- Labels: EmArcy; MG 36039

Clifford Brown chronology
The Clifford Brown Sextet in Paris (1953)	Best Coast Jazz (1956)	Clifford Brown All Stars (1954)

Best Coast Jazz is an album by American jazz trumpeter Clifford Brown featuring tracks recorded in 1954 and released on the EmArcy label. Further tracks from the same sessions were released as Clifford Brown All Stars in 1956 following Brown's death.

== Reception ==
Professional ratings
Review scores
Source	Rating
AllMusic	4.5/5 stars

AllMusic awarded the album 4½ stars and Scott Yanow, in his review, states "fine solos all around but Brownie's closing statement cuts everyone".

== Track listing ==
1. "Coronado" (Johnny Coles) – 19:46
2. "You Go to My Head" (J. Fred Coots, Haven Gillespie) – 17:12

== Personnel ==
- Clifford Brown – trumpet
- Herb Geller, Joe Maini – alto saxophone
- Walter Benton – tenor saxophone
- Kenny Drew – piano
- Curtis Counce – bass
- Max Roach – drums
