= Big Daddy Multitude =

Studio album by Mustard Plug
- Released: December 1993
- Recorded: Station C Studios in Grand Rapids, MI
- Genre: Ska
- Length: 53:09
- Label: Moon Ska Records
- Producer: J. Oscar Bittinger

Mustard Plug chronology
Skapocalypse Now! (1992)	Big Daddy Multitude (1993)	Evildoers Beware! (1997)

Professional ratings
Review scores
Source	Rating
AllMusic	2/5 stars
Albuquerque Journal	3/5 stars

Big Daddy Multitude is the second album by Mustard Plug. It was released in 1993.

== Track listing ==
1. "Skank By Numbers" – 2:35
2. "Too Stoopid" – 4:12
3. "Schoolboy" – 3:48
4. "Mr. Smiley" – 2:45
5. "Ball Park Skank" – 3:10
6. "Thigh High Nylons" – 3:24
7. "Dysfunktional" – 3:36
8. "Alone" – 3:01
9. "Summertime" – 2:46
10. "Murder in Tulip City" – 3:21
11. "Gum" – 2:28
12. "I Made Love to a Martian" – 5:19
13. "Brain on Ska" – 1:42
14. "Insomnia" – 4:36
15. "Average Guy" – 2:47
16. "Grow Up" – 3:39
