= U.F.O. (album) =

Studio album by Jim Sullivan
- Released: 1969
- Genre: Folk; psychedelic folk; folk rock
- Length: 28:45
- Label: Monnie
- Producer: Al Dobbs; Chad Dulaney; Norman Skolnik

Jim Sullivan chronology
U.F.O. (1969)	Jim Sullivan (1972)

Singles from U.F.O.
- 1. "Rosey" / "Roll Back the Time" Released: 1970

U.F.O. is the debut album by psychedelic folk singer-songwriter Jim Sullivan, released in 1969. The album was unpopular upon release, but has gained a cult following in part due to the mysterious disappearance of Sullivan. While it is commonly known as U.F.O., a 1970 pressing on Century City Records titled the album simply as Jim Sullivan.

The album deals with supernatural and extraterrestrial themes, topics that Sullivan was obsessed with. "Rosey" was released as a single from the album in 1970 on Century City Records.

== Background ==
The album was released on a private label in 1969 and received little attention at the time. Actor Al Dobbs founded the Monnie record label to press Sullivan's album. The artist enlisted session musician ensemble The Wrecking Crew to help fill out the songs, and it was recorded and released later that year. Sullivan would follow the album with a self-titled release in 1972 before disappearing.

The album is notable not only for its obscurity, but also for its lyrics that seem to predict Sullivan's own disappearance.

After years of obscurity, Light in the Attic founder Matt Sullivan (no relation) discovered the record while surfing obscure music blogs. He was transfixed by the cover art and Sullivan's voice and eventually got the album repressed on his label in 2010. Record club Vinyl Me, Please partnered with the label in 2019 and repressed the album on colored vinyl as part of their monthly subscription series. If the Evening Were Dawn, an album of compiled demo tracks from the recording sessions of U.F.O. was released on October 25, 2019 by Light in the Attic.

== Reception ==
Professional ratings
Review scores
Source	Rating
AllMusic	4/5 stars

As the album was released on a private label, the album garnered little critical attention upon release. Due to the 2010 reissue and the record's hazy history, modern reviews have reappraised the album. James Allen of AllMusic called the album a "lost classic" and praised the atmospheric and orchestral feel of Jimmy Bond's string arrangements. The Independent wrote that the album has its moments of "hippy excess" but that much of the material is full with David Axelrod-esque string arrangements and features an essence similar to that of "Wichita Lineman".

== Track listing ==
All tracks are written by Jim Sullivan.

Side one
No.	Title	Length
1.	"Jerome"	2:47
2.	"Plain As Your Eyes Can See"	2:27
3.	"Roll Back the Time"	2:14
4.	"Whistle Stop"	2:37
5.	"Rosey"	3:21
Total length:		13:26

Side two
No.	Title	Length
1.	"Highways"	2:51
2.	"U.F.O."	2:50
3.	"So Natural"	3:02
4.	"Johnny"	4:05
5.	"Sandman"	2:31
Total length:		15:19

== Personnel ==
Adapted from LP liner notes of the 2010 Light in the Attic reissue.

- Jim Sullivan – writer, singer, guitar
- Earl Palmer – drums
- Lyle Ritz – bass guitar
- Max Bennett – bass guitar
- Don Randi – keyboards
- Lee Kiefer – technician
- Jimmy Bond – producer, arrangements, double bass
- Peter Abbot – engineer
- Al Dobbs – executive producer
- Chad Dulaney – executive producer
- Norman Skolnik – executive producer
