= If You Go =

Studio album by Peggy Lee
- Released: November 1961
- Recorded: June 22, 24, 27, 1961
- Genre: Jazz
- Length: 31:49
- Label: Capitol
- Producer: Dave Cavanaugh

Peggy Lee chronology
Basin Street East Proudly Presents Miss Peggy Lee (1961)	If You Go (1961)	Blues Cross Country (1962)

Professional ratings
Review scores
Source	Rating
AllMusic	3.5/5 stars
New Record Mirror	4/5 stars

If You Go is a 1961 album by Peggy Lee. John Engstead was the front cover photographer.

== Track listing ==
1. "As Time Goes By" (Herman Hupfeld) – 2:48
2. "If You Go" (Geoffrey Parsons, Michel Emer) – 2:39
3. "Oh Love Hast Thou Forsaken Me" (William Bowers) – 2:33
4. "Say It Isn't So" (Irving Berlin) – 2:53
5. "I Wish I Didn't Love You So" (Frank Loesser) – 2:45
6. "Maybe It's Because (I Love You Too Much)" (Irving Berlin) – 2:01
7. "I'm Gonna Laugh You Right Out of My Life" (Cy Coleman, Joseph McCarthy, Jr.) – 2:44
8. "I Get Along Without You Very Well (Except Sometimes)" (Hoagy Carmichael, Jane Brown Thompson) – 2:45
9. "(I Love Your) Gypsy Heart" (Peggy Lee, Harry Sukman) – 2:26
10. "When I Was a Child" (Floyd Huddleston, Mark McIntyre) – 3:11
11. "Here's That Rainy Day" (Jimmy Van Heusen, Johnny Burke) – 2:46
12. "Smile" (Charles Chaplin, John Turner, Geoffrey Parsons) – 2:18

== Personnel ==
- Peggy Lee, vocals
- Quincy Jones, arranger and conductor
