= Yellow No. 5 (album) =

Yellow #5

Studio album by Mustard Plug
- Released: September 17, 2002
- Genre: Ska
- Length: 28:57
- Label: Hopeless Records
- Producer: Mustard Plug

Mustard Plug chronology
Pray for Mojo (1999)	Yellow #5 (2002)	Masterpieces: 1991–2002 (2005)

Professional ratings
Review scores
Source	Rating
Allmusic	3/5 stars

Yellow #5 is the fifth album by Mustard Plug. It was named after the ingredient of malt liquor energy drinks, such as Sparks, Tilt, and Core.

== Background ==
By April 2002, the band had spent a few months writing material for their next album. In April and May, they premiered new songs at a handful of shows; they recorded an album in June 2002.

== Release ==
In August, the band appeared on the Warped Tour; during one show, the crowd attempted to climb the stage. As a result of this, the band claimed they were banned from tour. Yellow No. 5 was released on September 17, 2002, through Hopeless Records. The following month, the band performed at Skatefest. In November, the band embarked on a Canadian tour with The Planet Smashers and Closet Monster. In January and February 2003, the band embarked on a tour of the UK. Between September and December 2003, the band toured across the US with River City Rebels. In January 2004, the band headlined the Moto City and Midwest Ska festivals.

In February 2004, the band toured across the US as part of the Ska Is Dead tour. In April and May 2004, the band went on a sequel tour, dubbed Ska Is Dead and You're Next Tour, with Big D and the Kids Table, Catch 22, and Planet Smashers. During this trek, the band showed off new drummer John Massel and bassist Rick Johnson, who replaced Brad Rozier and Matt Van, respectively. They embarked on a West Coast iteration of the Ska Is Dead tour, which was bookended by various club and college shows in September and November 2004. They held four Midwest Ska Fest performances to close out the year.

== Track listing ==
1. "Not Enough" – 2:44
2. "Get It Goin' On" – 2:25
3. "The Park" – 2:40
4. "You Want It, We Got It" – 2:28
5. "Already Gone" – 3:13
6. "Safe" – 2:38
7. "Just a Minute" – 2:54
8. "No One But Myself" – 2:43
9. "Your Secret" – 2:36
10. "In Your Face" – 2:16
11. "Sorry Now" – 2:20

== Personnel ==
- Dave Kirchgessner – vocals
- Colin Clive – guitar, vocals
- Matt Van – bass guitar
- Brandon Jenison – trumpet, backing vocals
- Jim Hofer – trombone
- Brad Rozier – drums
