= Bob Gordon (saxophonist) =

- Born: June 11, 1928; St. Louis, Missouri, U.S.
- Died: August 28, 1955 (aged 27) California
- Genres: Jazz
- Occupation: Musician
- Instrument: Saxophone
- Years active: 1940s–1950s
- Formerly of: Jack Montrose, Herbie Harper

Bob Gordon (June 11, 1928 – August 28, 1955) was an American cool jazz baritone saxophonist born in St. Louis, Missouri, best known as a sideman for musicians like Stan Kenton, Shelly Manne, Chet Baker, Clifford Brown, Maynard Ferguson, Herbie Harper, and Jack Montrose. He released one album as a bandleader. Gordon died in a car accident on his way to playing at a Pete Rugolo concert in San Diego.

== Career ==
His friend saxophonist Jack Montrose wrote, "The union of Bob Gordon and the baritone saxophone must have been decreed in Heaven, for never have I viewed such rapport between the natural tendencies of a musical instrument and the mind of the man using it. I cannot imagine Bob Gordon using any other instrument".

== Discography ==
=== As leader/co-leader ===
- 1953: Moods in Jazz, with Herbie Harper (Tampa)
- 1954: Herbie Harper featuring Bud Shank and Bob Gordon (Liberty)
- 1954: Meet Mr. Gordon (Pacific Jazz)
- 1955: Jack Montrose with Bob Gordon (Atlantic)
- 1955: Introducing Bob Gordon (EmArcy)
- 2004: Bob Gordon Memorial (Fresh Sound)

=== As sideman ===
With Chet Baker

- Grey December (Pacific Jazz, 1953)
- The Trumpet Artistry of Chet Baker (Pacific Jazz, 1953)

With Pete Rugolo

- Introducing Pete Rugolo (Columbia, 1954)
- Adventures in Rhythm (Columbia, 1954)
- Rugolomania (Columbia, 1955)
- New Sounds by Pete Rugolo (Harmony, 1954–55, [1957])

With Jack Montrose

- Arranged by Montrose (Pacific Jazz, 1954)
- Arranged/Played/Composed by Jack Montrose (Atlantic, 1955)
- Jack Montrose Sextet (Pacific Jazz, 1955)

With Maynard Ferguson

- Dimensions (EmArcy, 1955)
- Maynard Ferguson Octet (EmArcy, 1955)

With Clifford Brown

- Clifford Brown Ensemble Featuring Zoot Sims (Pacific Jazz, 1955)

With Spud Murphy

- Four Saxophones in Twelve Tones (GNP Crescendo, 1955)

With Dave Pell

- Jazz & Romantic Places (Atlantic, 1955)

With Shorty Rogers

- Shorty Rogers Courts the Count (RCA Victor, 1954)
