= Jim Sullivan (musician) =

American singer-songwriter (1939–1975)

- Born: James Anthony Sullivan; August 13, 1939; Nebraska, U.S.
- Disappeared: March 6, 1975 (aged 35) near Puerto de Luna, New Mexico, U.S.
- Status: Missing for 51 years, 8 months and 13 days
- Spouse: Barbara Sullivan (m. 1960)
- Children: 2
- Musical career
- Origin: San Diego, California, U.S.
- Genres: Folk; country; rock
- Occupations: Musician; songwriter
- Instruments: Guitar; vocals
- Years active: Early 1960s–1975
- Labels: Monnie; Century City; Playboy

James Anthony Sullivan (August 13, 1939 – disappeared March 6, 1975) was an American singer-songwriter and guitarist who released two albums before he disappeared without a trace in New Mexico.

== Early life ==
James Anthony Sullivan was born in Nebraska on August 13, 1939, the seventh son of a blue collar Irish-American family that relocated to San Diego, California, during World War II. In high school, Sullivan played guitar, was the quarterback of the varsity football team, and met his future wife, Barbara, whom he married in 1960. While attending college, Sullivan co-owned a bar that was ultimately a financial failure. In the mid-1960s, he played with the San Diego rock group the Survivors, which featured his sister-in-law Kathie as lead vocalist.

== Career ==
In 1968, the Sullivans relocated to Los Angeles, where Barbara worked as a secretary for Capitol Records while Jim played gigs in the evenings. His Hollywood social circle included actor Dennis Hopper, leading to an uncredited role as a guitarist at a hippie commune in Hopper's 1969 film Easy Rider.

After Barbara's unsuccessful attempts to interest Capitol Records in her husband, actor Al Dobbs heard Sullivan play at the Raft club in Malibu, and decided to raise funds to record him, founding Monnie Records for that purpose. In 1969, Sullivan released the album U.F.O., recorded with keyboardist Don Randi, drummer Earl Palmer, and bassist Jimmy Bond, all members of the Wrecking Crew. Although its psychedelic country-folk stylings drew parallels to Gene Clark and Joe South, the album made little impact, nor did a remixed version released by Century City Records in 1970.

In 1972, Sullivan released a second album, Jim Sullivan, on Playboy Records. Like its predecessor, it failed to attract interest. By this time, Sullivan's professional struggles led to marital difficulties, and Jim and Barbara separated. Their plan was for Jim to relocate to Nashville, Tennessee, and once he reestablished his career, he would send for Barbara and their two children.

== Disappearance ==
Sullivan left Los Angeles on March 4, 1975, to drive to Nashville alone in his Volkswagen Beetle. The next day, Sullivan was pulled over by police on suspicion of driving under the influence. After passing a sobriety test, he checked into the La Mesa Motel in Santa Rosa, New Mexico. After checking in, Sullivan purchased a bottle of vodka at a liquor store and left town in his car. Sullivan was seen the following day some 26 miles (42 km) south of Santa Rosa, near Puerto de Luna, at a remote ranch owned by the Gennitti family. His abandoned car was later found nearby, which contained his money, papers, guitar, clothes, and a box of his unsold records. Despite extensive searches by law enforcement and his family, Sullivan was never seen again.

Shortly after his disappearance, a decomposed body resembling Sullivan was found in a remote area several miles from where he was last seen, but it was determined not to be him. Over the years, Sullivan's disappearance has been variously attributed to suicide, foul play involving the police or the Mafia, and alien abduction.

His wife, Barbara Sullivan, died in November 2016.

== Legacy ==
Sullivan's records, especially U.F.O., developed a cult following in later years, partly because of their rarity and obscurity. In 2010, Matt Sullivan (no relation), the founder of Light in the Attic Records, decided to reissue U.F.O., and made serious attempts to uncover the mystery of Sullivan's disappearance, interviewing many of those who knew him and those involved in his recordings, but revealing little new information. The album was issued on CD in 2011. The release of the album and the resulting media coverage sparked new interest in Sullivan and his work.

A collection of previously unreleased demos by Sullivan, If the Evening Were Dawn, was released in 2019 by Light in the Attic.

== Discography ==
=== Albums ===
- U.F.O. (Monnie, 1969)
- Jim Sullivan (Playboy, 1972)
- If the Evening Were Dawn (Light in the Attic, 2019) (compilation)

=== Singles ===
- "Rosey" / "Roll Back the Time" (Century City, 1970)
- "I Do What I Please" / "Inside Outside" (Fanfare, 1971)
- "Highway" / "Lorelei Lee" (RCA, 1971) (promotional only)

== See also ==
- List of people who disappeared mysteriously: 1910–1990
