= Stanley Adams (songwriter) =

American lyricist and songwriter (1907–1994)

- Born: August 14, 1907; Manhattan, New York City, New York, United States
- Died: January 28, 1994 (aged 86); Manhasset, New York, United States
- Occupations: Lyricist, songwriter
- Honors: Songwriters Hall of Fame

Stanley Adams (August 14, 1907 – January 27, 1994) was an American lyricist and songwriter. He wrote the English lyrics for the song "What a Diff'rence a Day Makes" (song written by the Mexican composer María Grever in 1934) and the English lyrics for "La Cucaracha." Adams was the president of the American Society of Composers, Authors and Publishers (ASCAP) between 1953 and 1956, and again from 1959 until 1980.

== Biography ==
Born in Manhattan, New York, Adams attended New York University where he earned a law degree in 1929. He was still at law school when he became a songwriter; his first song – "Rollin' Down the River" – written in collaboration with Fats Waller, became a hit after being recorded by Guy Lombardo. Adams also wrote lyrics to songs by Hoagy Carmichael, Ray Henderson, Victor Herbert, Oscar Levant, Sigmund Romberg and Max Steiner, and contributed songs to several Hollywood and Broadway musicals.

Adams died in Manhasset, New York, from cancer, at the age of 86.

== Recognition ==
In 1988, Adams was awarded the Board of Directors Award at the Songwriters Hall of Fame. He also served on the boards of many charitable organizations including the Musicians Aid Society, the National Cultural Center, Music for the Blind, the American Federation of Musicians, the National Music Council, and the Music Commission of New York.
