= Jack Montrose =

American musician (1928–2006)

Jack Montrose (December 30, 1928 – February 7, 2006) was an American jazz tenor saxophonist and arranger. After attending college in Los Angeles, he worked with Jerry Gray and then Art Pepper. Montrose also did arrangements for Clifford Brown. He became known for cool jazz and/or West coast jazz.

Montrose was born in Detroit. Beginning in the mid-1950s Montrose's heroin addiction became a liability and by the time he had overcome it his style of jazz was no longer popular. This led him to play in strip joints for a time until he relocated to Las Vegas where he worked in casinos. Montrose returned to recording in 1977 and in 1986 had some success in collaboration with Pete Jolly.

Jack Montrose is not to be confused with tenor saxophonist J.R. Monterose.

He died in Las Vegas.

== Discography ==
=== As leader ===
- Arranged by Montrose (Pacific Jazz, 1954) with Bob Gordon Quartet / Clifford Brown Ensemble
- Arranged/Played/Composed by Jack Montrose (Atlantic, 1955) with Bob Gordon
- Jack Montrose Sextet (Pacific Jazz, 1955)
- Blues and Vanilla (RCA Victor, 1956) with Red Norvo
- The Horn's Full (RCA Victor, 1957)
- Spread a Little Joy (Slingshot, 1987) - The Jack Montrose & Pete Jolly Quartet
- Live at Capozzoli's (Hindsight, 1999) - The Jack Montrose Quintet with Ron Stout, Ross Tompkins, Richard Simon, Paul Kreibich

=== As sideman ===
With Chet Baker

- Grey December (Pacific Jazz, 1953 [1992])
- The Trumpet Artistry of Chet Baker (Pacific Jazz, 1953–54)
- Chet Baker & Strings (Pacific Jazz, 1954) - as arranger

With Elmer Bernstein

- "The Man with the Golden Arm" (Decca, 1956)

With Frank Butler

- The Stepper (Xanadu, 1977)

With Shelly Manne

- Concerto for Clarinet & Combo (Contemporary, 1957)

With Art Pepper

- Surf Ride (Savoy, 1952-1954 [1956])

With Shorty Rogers

- Shorty Rogers Plays Richard Rodgers (RCA Victor, 1957)
- Portrait of Shorty (RCA Victor, 1957)

With Mel Torme

- Mel Torme Sings Fred Astaire (Bethlehem, 1956)
