= Hank Jones discography =

Hank Jones was an American jazz pianist who recorded from 1947 to 2010.

== As leader/co-leader ==
Year recorded	Title	Personnel	Label	Year released
1947–1953	Urbanity	Drumless trio: with Johnny Smith (guitar) and Ray Brown (bass)	Clef	1956
1955	The Trio	Trio: with Wendell Marshall and Kenny Clarke	Savoy	1956
1955	Quartet-Quintet	Quartet: with Donald Byrd, Eddie Jones and Kenny Clarke; Quintet: plus Matty Dice	Savoy	1955
1955	Bluebird	Quartet: with Wendell Marshall/Eddie Jones and Kenny Clarke; Quintet: plus Herbie Mann/Jerome Richardson/Donald Byrd and Matty Dice/Joe Wilder	Savoy	1956
1956	Have You Met Hank Jones	Solo piano	Savoy	1956
1956	Hank Jones' Quartet	Quartet: with Bobby Jaspar, Paul Chambers and Kenny Clarke	Savoy	1956
1958	Gigi	Quartet: with Barry Galbraith, Arnold Fishkin and Donald Lamond	Golden Crest	1958
1958	Keepin' Up with the Joneses	as The Jones Brothers: Thad Jones, Elvin Jones and Eddie Jones	MereoJazz	1958
1958	The Talented Touch	Quartet: with Barry Galbraith (guitar), Milt Hinton, Osie Johnson	Capitol	1958
1958	Porgy and Bess	Quartet: with Kenny Burrell (guitar), Milt Hinton, Elvin Jones	Capitol	1959
1963	Here's Love	Quartet: with Kenny Burrell, Milt Hinton, Elvin Jones	Argo	1963
1964	This Is Ragtime Now!	Trio: with Milt Hinton, Osie Johnson	ABC-Paramount	1964
1966	Happenings	with Oliver Nelson and Orchestra	Impulse!	1966
1974	Let It Happen	as The Jazz Piano Quartet: with Dick Hyman, Marian McPartland and Roland Hanna	RCA	1974
1975	Hanky Panky	Trio: with Ron Carter and Grady Tate	East Wind	1975
1976	Satin Doll: Dedicated to Duke Ellington	Solo piano	Trio	1976
1976	Jones-Brown-Smith	Trio: with Ray Brown and Jimmie Smith	Concord Jazz	1977
1976	Arigato	Trio: with Richard Davis/Jay Leonhart and Ronnie Bedford; Quartet: plus Ray Rivera	Progressive	1977
1977	Bop Redux	Trio: with George Duvivier and Ben Riley	Muse	1977
1977	Just for Fun	Trio: with Ray Brown and Shelly Manne; Quartet: plus Howard Roberts	Galaxy	1977
1977	I Remember You	Trio: with George Duvivier and Oliver Jackson	Black & Blue	1977
1977	Have You Met This Jones?	Trio with Isla Eckinger and Kurt Bong	MPS	1978
1977	The Trio	Trio: with Milt Hinton and Bob Rosengarden	Chiaroscuro	1977
1977	Rockin' in Rhythm	with Ray Brown and Jimmie Smith	Concord Jazz	1977
1977–1978	Tiptoe Tapdance	Solo piano	Galaxy	1978
1978	Groovin' High	Quintet: with Sam Jones, Mickey Roker, Thad Jones and Charlie Rouse	Muse	1978
1978	Our Delights	Co-leader piano duet with Tommy Flanagan	Galaxy	1979
1978	More Delights	Co-leader piano duet with Tommy Flanagan	Galaxy	1985
1978	Compassion	Trio: with George Duvivier and Alan Dawson	Black & Blue	1978
1978	Ain't Misbehavin'	Trio: with Richard Davis and Roy Haynes; Sextet: plus Bob Ojeda, Teddy Edwards and Kenny Burrell	Galaxy	1979
1979	An Evening with Two Grand Pianos	Co-leader piano duet with John Lewis	Little David	1979
1979	Easy to Love	Trio: with George Duvivier and Shelly Manne	Lob	1979
1979	Hank Jones Trio Live in Japan	Trio: with George Duvivier and Shelly Manne	Trio	1979
1979	Trio 1979 Discoveries	Trio: with George Duvivier and Shelly Manne	55	2010
1979	Bluesette	Trio: with George Duvivier and Alan Dawson	Black & Blue	1979
1983	I'm All Smiles	Co-leader piano duet with Tommy Flanagan	MPS	1984
1983	In Copenhagen Live at Jazzhus Slukefter 1983	with Mads Vinding (saxophone) and Shelly Manne	Storyville	2018
1983	In Copenhagen Live at Jazzhus Slukefter 1983 Vol.2	with Mads Vinding (saxophone) and Shelly Manne	Storyville	2020
1987	Duo	Co-leader duo with Red Mitchell (bass)	Timeless	1987
1988	The Spirit of 176	Co-leader piano duet with George Shearing	Concord	1988
1989	The Oracle – also released as Interface	Trio: with Dave Holland and Billy Higgins	Serious / EmArcy	1989
1989	Lazy Afternoon	Quartet: with Ken Peplowski (clarinet), Dave Holland and Keith Copeland	Concord Jazz	1989
1990	Hank Jones with the Meridian String Quartet	With the Meridian String Quartet conducted by Manny Albam	LRC	1991
1991	Hank Jones Trio with Mads Vinding & Al Foster	Trio: with Mads Vinding and Al Foster	Storyville	2010
1991	Live at Maybeck Recital Hall, Volume Sixteen	Solo piano	Concord	1992
1992	Handful of Keys: The Music of Thomas 'Fats' Waller	Solo piano	Verve	1992
1992	When There Is Love	Co-leader with Abbey Lincoln (vocals)	Verve	1993
1993	Upon Reflection: The Music of Thad Jones	Trio: with George Mraz and Elvin Jones	Verve	1993
1994	Steal Away - Spirituals, Hymns And Folk Songs	Co-leader duo with Charlie Haden (bass)	Verve	1995
1995	Sarala	Afro-pop album with Cheick Tidiane Seck	Verve	1995
1996	Favors	Trio: with George Mraz and Dennis Mackrel, plus The Winds Jazz Orchestra	Verve	1997
2003	Hank and Frank	Co-leader with Frank Wess (tenor sax, flute), with Ilya Lushtak (guitar), John Webber (bass) and Mickey Roker (drums)	Lineage	2006
2003–2004	My Funny Valentine	Solo piano	Eighty-Eight's	2005
2004	'Round Midnight	Solo piano	Eighty-Eight's	2006
2004	For My Father	Trio: with George Mraz and Dennis Mackrel	Justin Time	2005
2005	You Are There	Co-leader with Roberta Gambarini (vocals)	EmArcy	2007
2006	Kids: Live at Dizzy's Club Coca-Cola	Co-leader duo with Joe Lovano (saxophone)	Blue Note	2007
2006	West of 5th	Trio: with Jimmy Cobb and Christian McBride	Chesky	2006
2006	Our Delight	Co-leader with James Moody (saxophone and flute), with Todd Coolman and Adam Nussbaum	IPO Recordings	2008
2008	Pleased to Meet You	Co-leader piano duet with Oliver Jones, with Brandi Disterheft and Jim Doxas	Justin Time	2009
2008	One For Three - The Jones Suite - Live at Jazz Baltica Salzau	with Jazz Baltica Ensemble	enja	2010
2008	Alone Together	Co-leader piano duet with Don Friedman, plus Martin Wind (bass), Matt Wilson (drums)	Edition Longplay	2012
2009?	Hank and Frank II	Co-leader with Frank Wess, with Ilya Lushtak, John Webber and Mickey Roker	Lineage	2009
2009	Jazz at Prague Castle 2009	Trio: with George Mraz and Willie Jones	Multisonic	2010
2010	Come Sunday	Co-leader duo with Charlie Haden (bass)	EmArcy	2012

== Great Jazz Trio ==
Recording date	Title	Personnel	Label	Year released
1976	I'm Old Fashioned	Ron Carter and Tony Williams with Sadao Watanabe	East Wind	1976
1976	Love for Sale	Buster Williams and Tony Williams	East Wind	1976
1977	The Great Jazz Trio at the Village Vanguard	Ron Carter and Tony Williams	East Wind	1977
1977	The Great Jazz Trio at the Village Vanguard Vol. 2	Ron Carter and Tony Williams	East Wind	1977
1977	The Great Jazz Trio at the Village Vanguard Again	Ron Carter and Tony Williams	East Wind	2000
1977	Bird of Paradise (Sadao Watanabe album)	Ron Carter and Tony Williams with Sadao Watanabe	Flying Disk	1979
1977	Kindness Joy Love & Happiness	Ron Carter and Tony Williams	East Wind	1977
1977	Direct from L.A.	Ron Carter and Tony Williams	East Wind	1978
1978	Milestones	Ron Carter and Tony Williams	East Wind	1978
1978	Carnaval	Ron Carter and Tony Williams with Sadao Watanabe	Galaxy	1983
1978	The Great Tokyo Meeting	Ron Carter and Tony Williams	East Wind	1978
1980	Chapter II	Eddie Gómez and Al Foster	East Wind	1980
1980	Moreover	Eddie Gómez and Al Foster	East Wind	1980
1980	Re-visited Vol.1 & Vol.2	Eddie Gómez and Al Foster	East Wind	1980
1980	The Great Jazz Trio Plays Standard	Eddie Gómez and Al Foster	EMI/Somethin' Else	1998
1982	Threesome	Eddie Gómez and Jimmy Cobb	Eastworld	1982
1982	What's New	Eddie Gómez and Jimmy Cobb with Nancy Wilson	Eastworld	1982
1983	The Club New Yorker	Eddie Gómez and Jimmy Cobb with guest Lewis Eley	Denon, Interface	1983
1983	Ambrosia	Eddie Gómez and Jimmy Cobb with Art Farmer	Denon, Interface	1984
1983	N.Y.Sophisticate: a Tribute to Duke Ellington	Eddie Gomez and Jimmy Cobb with the Strings Quartet	Denon, Interface	1984
1984	Monk's Mood	Eddie Gomez and Jimmy Cobb with guest Terumasa Hino	Denon, Interface	1984
1988	Great Standards, Vol. 1	Mads Vinding and Billy Hart	Alfa Jazz	1988
1988	Great Standards, Vol. 2	Mads Vinding and Billy Hart	Alfa Jazz	1988
1989	Great Standards, Vol. 3	Mads Vinding and Billy Hart	Alfa Jazz	1989
1989	Great Standards, Vol. 4	Mads Vinding and Billy Hart	Alfa Jazz	1989
1990	Great Standards, Vol. 5	Mads Vinding and Billy Hart	Alfa Jazz	1990
1991–09	Flowers for Lady Day	George Mraz and Roy Haynes	Alfa Jazz	1992
1998?	What's New	Yosuke Inoue and Ben Riley with guest Teodross Avery	Baybridge	1998
2002–05	Autumn Leaves	Elvin Jones and Richard Davis	Eighty-Eight's	2002
2002–05, 2003–08	Someday My Prince Will Come	Elvin Jones and Richard Davis	Eighty-Eight's	2003
2002–05, 2004–02	Collaboration	Elvin Jones and Richard Davis	Eighty-Eight's	2004
2004–06	'S Wonderful	John Patitucci and Jack DeJohnette	Eighty-Eight's	2004
2005–06	Speak Low	John Patitucci and Jack DeJohnette	Eighty-Eight's	2005
2006–09	Stella by Starlight	John Patitucci and Omar Hakim with guest Sadao Watanabe	Eighty-Eight's	2006
2007–07	July 5 th - Live at Birdland NY	John Patitucci and Omar Hakim	Eighty-Eight's	2007
2007–07	July 6 th - Live at Birdland NY	John Patitucci and Omar Hakim	Eighty-Eight's	2007
2008–09	Blue Minor	George Mraz and Billy Kilson with guests Keiko Lee (vocals) and Toku (vocals, flute)	Eighty-Eight's	2008
2009–08	Jam at Basie featuring Hank Jones	David Wong (bassist) and Lee Pearson	Happinet/ZZJAPLUS	2009
2010–02	Last Recording	David Wong and Lee Pearson with guests Roy Hargrove (alto saxophon) and Raymond McMorrin (tenor saxophone）	Eighty-Eight's	2010
2004– 2010–07	The Memorial of Hank Jones: Unpublished Anthology	John Patitucci and Jack DeJohnette; John Patitucci and Omar Hakim; George Mraz and Billy Kilson with guests Keiko Lee and Toku; David Wong and Lee Pearson with guest Raymond McMorrin; plus Joe Wilder (flute), Benisuke Sakai (bass), Tiffany (vocals) and Erena Terakubo (alto saxophone)	Eighty-Eight's	2010

== Great Jazz Quartet/Quintet ==
Year recorded	Title	Personnel	Label	released
1985	Great Jazz Quartet Live In Japan	with Ray Brown, Alan Dawson and Sam Most	TDK	1986
1992	Standard Jazz For Lovers Vol.1	with Warren Vaché Sr., Satoru Oda, Mads Vinding and Billy Hart	Seven Seas Music	1993
1992	Standard Jazz For Lovers Vol.2	with Warren Vaché Sr., Satoru Oda, Mads Vinding and Billy Hart	Seven Seas Music	1993
1993	Standard Jazz For Lovers Vol.3	with Warren Vaché Sr., Satoru Oda, George Mraz and Lewis Nash	King Records (Japan)	1994
1993	Standard Jazz For Lovers Vol.4	with Warren Vaché Sr., Satoru Oda, George Mraz and Lewis Nash	King Records (Japan)	1994
1994	Minority Anyone	with Satoru Oda, Slide Hampton, Andy McKee and Lewis Nash	Sony Music	1995
1994	Satolism	with Satoru Oda, Slide Hampton, Andy McKee and Lewis Nash	Venus	1995

== As sideman ==
With Pepper Adams

- The Cool Sound of Pepper Adams (Regent, 1958) – rec. 1957
- Pepper Adams Plays the Compositions of Charlie Mingus (Workshop Jazz, 1964) – rec. 1963
- Conjuration: Fat Tuesday's Session (Reservoir, 1990) – rec. 1983

With Gene Ammons

- Bad! Bossa Nova (Prestige, 1962)
- Got My Own (Prestige, 1972)
- Big Bad Jug (Prestige, 1973) – rec. 1972

With Eddie Bert

- Musician of the Year (Savoy, 1955)
- Encore (Savoy, 1955)
- Montage (Savoy, 1955) – omnibus

With Bob Brookmeyer

- Tonite's Music Today (Storyville, 1956) also with Zoot Sims
- Whooeeee (Storyville, 1956) - Zoot Sims-Bob Brookmeyer Quintet
- Brookmeyer (Vik, 1956)
- Stretching Out (United Artists, 1958) - Zoot Sims-Bob Brookmeyer Octet
- Jazz Is a Kick (Mercury, 1960)
- Gloomy Sunday and Other Bright Moments (Verve, 1961)

With Ruth Brown

- Late Date with Ruth Brown (Atlantic, 1959)
- Ruth Brown '65 (Mainstream, 1965)

With Kenny Burrell

- Night Song (Verve, 1969)
- Bluesin' Around (Columbia, 1983) – rec. 1962

With Donald Byrd

- Byrd's Word (Savoy, 1955)
- New Formulas from the Jazz Lab (RCA Victor, 1957) also with Gigi Gryce
- Jazz Lab (Jubilee, 1958) also with Gigi Gryce

With Jimmy Cleveland

- Introducing Jimmy Cleveland and His All Stars (EmArcy, 1955)
- Rhythm Crazy (EmArcy, 1964) – rec. 1959

With Al Cohn

- That Old Feeling (RCA Victor, 1955)
- The Brothers! (RCA Victor, 1955) also with Bill Perkins and Richie Kamuca
- From A to...Z (RCA Victor, 1956) also with Zoot Sims
- The Sax Section (Epic, 1956)
- Cohn on the Saxophone (Dawn, 1956)
- Son of Drum Suite (RCA Victor, 1960)

With Chris Connor

- Angel Eyes (Alfa Jazz, 1991)
- As Time Goes By (Enja, 1991)

With Art Farmer

- Last Night When We Were Young (ABC-Paramount, 1957)
- Portrait of Art Farmer (Contemporary, 1958)
- The Aztec Suite (United Artists, 1959)

With Curtis Fuller

- New Trombone (Prestige, 1957)
- Cabin in the Sky (Impulse!, 1962)

With Dizzy Gillespie

- A Portrait of Duke Ellington (Verve, 1960)
- The Bop Session (Sonet, 1975) also with Sonny Stitt, Percy Heath and Max Roach

With Dexter Gordon

- Ca'Purange (Prestige, 1972)
- Tangerine (Prestige, 1972)

With Johnny Hartman

- I Just Dropped by to Say Hello (Impulse!, 1963)
- The Voice That Is! (Impulse!, 1964)

With Coleman Hawkins

- The Hawk in Hi Fi (RCA Victor, 1956)
- The Hawk in Paris (Vik, 1956)
- Coleman Hawkins and Confrères (Verve, 1958)
- The High and Mighty Hawk (Felsted, 1958)

With Johnny Hodges

- Sandy's Gone (Verve, 1963)
- Wings & Things (Verve, 1965) also with Wild Bill Davis
- Blue Notes (Verve, 1966)
- Triple Play (RCA Victor, 1967)
- Don't Sleep in the Subway (Verve, 1967)
- 3 Shades of Blue (Flying Dutchman, 1970)

With Milt Jackson

- Opus de Jazz (Savoy, 1956)
- The Jazz Skyline (Savoy, 1956)
- Bags & Flutes (Atlantic, 1957)
- Bags & Trane (Atlantic, 1960) also with John Coltrane
- Statements (Impulse!, 1962)
- Big Bags (Riverside, 1962)
- For Someone I Love (Riverside, 1963)
- Milt Jackson Quintet Live at the Village Gate (Riverside, 1963)
- Much in Common (Verve, 1964) also with Ray Brown
- Ray Brown / Milt Jackson (Verve, 1965) also with Ray Brown

With J. J. Johnson

- J Is for Jazz (Columbia, 1956)
- Jay and Kai (Columbia, 1957)
- J.J.'s Broadway (Verve, 1963)
- J.J.! (RCA Victor, 1964)
- Broadway Express (RCA Victor, 1965)
- The Total J.J. Johnson (RCA Victor, 1967)

With Elvin Jones

- Elvin! (Riverside, 1962) – rec. 1961–1962
- And Then Again (Atlantic, 1965)
- Dear John C. (Impulse!, 1965)

With Joe Lovano

- I'm All For You (Blue Note, 2004) – rec. 2003
- Joyous Encounter (Blue Note, 2005) – rec. 2004
- Classic! Live at Newport (Blue Note, 2016) – rec. 2005

With Helen Merrill

- Helen Merrill with Strings (EmArcy, 1955)
- Dream of You with Gil Evans (EmArcy, 1957)

With Oliver Nelson

- Oliver Nelson Plays Michelle (Impulse!, 1966)
- The Spirit of '67 also with Pee Wee Russell (Impulse!, 1967)
- The Kennedy Dream (Impulse!, 1967)
- Encyclopedia of Jazz (Verve, 1967) – rec. 1966
- The Sound of Feeling (Verve, 1968) – rec. 1966–1967

With Joe Newman

- Salute to Satch (RCA Victor, 1956)
- The Midgets (Vik, 1956)
- Hangin' Out with Joe Wilder (Concord Jazz, 1984)

With Art Pepper

- New York Album (Galaxy, 1985) – rec. 1979
- So in Love (Artists House, 1979)

With Jimmy Raney

- Jimmy Raney featuring Bob Brookmeyer also with Bob Brookmeyer (ABC/Paramount, 1956)
- Here's That Raney Day (Ahead, 1980)

With Emily Remler

- Firefly (Concord Records, 1981)
- East To Wes (Concord Records, 1988)

With Artie Shaw

- The Last Recordings (MusicMasters, 1954)[2CD]
- More Last Recordings (MusicMasters, 1954)[2CD]

With Sahib Shihab

- The Jazz We Heard Last Summer (Savoy, 1957)
- Jazz Sahib (Savoy, 1957)

With Johnny Smith

- The Sound of the Johnny Smith Guitar (Roulette, 1961)
- Johnny Smith (Verve, 1967)
- Johnny Smith's Kaleidoscope (Verve, 1967)

With Bob Stewart

- Welcome to the Club (VWC, 1986)
- Talk of The Town (VWC, 2004)

With Sonny Stitt

- Sonny Stitt Plays Arrangements from the Pen of Quincy Jones (Roost, 1955)
- Sonny Stitt Plays (Roost, 1955)
- Sonny Stitt with the New Yorkers (Roost, 1957)
- Stitt in Orbit (Roost, 1962)
- Now! (Impulse!, 1963)
- Salt and Pepper (Impulse!, 1963)
- Goin' Down Slow (Prestige, 1972)

With Lucky Thompson

- Lucky Thompson Plays Jerome Kern and No More (Moodsville, 1963)
- Lucky Strikes (Prestige, 1964)

With Cal Tjader

- Warm Wave (Verve, 1964)
- Breathe Easy (Galaxy, 1977)

With Ben Webster

- Music for Loving (Norgran, 1954)
- Wanted to Do One Together with "Sweets" Edison (Columbia, 1962)
- See You at the Fair (Impulse!, 1964)

With Ernie Wilkins

- Flutes & Reeds (Savoy, 1955) also with Frank Wess
- Top Brass (Savoy, 1955)

With Joe Wilder

- Wilder 'n' Wilder (Savoy, 1956)
- The Pretty Sound (Columbia, 1959)
- Jazz from Peter Gunn (Columbia, 1959)

With Kai Winding

- The Swingin' States (Columbia, 1958)
- Dance to the City Beat (Columbia, 1959) – rec. 1958–1959
- More Brass (Verve, 1966)

With others

- Cannonball Adderley, Somethin' Else (Blue Note, 1958)
- Nat Adderley, That's Nat (Savoy, 1955)
- Manny Albam, The Soul of the City (Solid State, 1966)
- Harry Allen, Isn't This a Lovely Day (BMG, 2004)
- Elek Bacsik, I Love You (Bob Thiele Music, 1974)
- Chet Baker, Baker's Holiday (Limelight, 1965)
- Louie Bellson, Drummer's Holiday (Verve, 1958) – rec. 1956–1958
- Ruby Braff, Ruby Braff Goes 'Girl Crazy' (Warner Brothers, 1958)
- Anthony Braxton, Seven Standards (Magenta, 1985)
- Rusty Bryant, For the Good Times (Prestige, 1973)
- Benny Carter, Legends (MusicMasters, 1993)
- Ron Carter, 1 + 3 (JVC, 1978)
- Paul Chambers, Bass on Top (Blue Note, 1957)
- Kenny Clarke and Ernie Wilkins, Kenny Clarke & Ernie Wilkins (Savoy, 1955)
- Earl Coleman, Earl Coleman Returns (Prestige, 1956)
- Steve Davis Meets Hank Jones, Vol. 1 (Smoke Sessions, 2008)
- Eddie Diehl, Well, Here It Is... (Lineage, 2004) – rec. 2003
- Kenny Dorham, Jazz Contrasts (Riverside, 1957)
- Ray Drummond, The Essence (DMP, 1991)
- Tal Farlow, A Sign of the Times (Concord Jazz, 1977)
- Victor Feldman, Merry Olde Soul (Riverside, 1961)
- Ella Fitzgerald, Rhythm Is My Business (Verve, 1962)
- Johnny Griffin, Soul Groove (Atlantic, 1963) also with Matthew Gee
- Gigi Gryce, Gigi Gryce (MetroJazz, 1958)
- Scott Hamilton, The Grand Appearance (Progressive, 1979)
- Lionel Hampton, You Better Know It!!! (Impulse!, 1965)
- Donna Hightower, Take One (Capitol, 1959)
- Kenyon Hopkins, The Hustler (soundtrack, 1961)
- Shirley Horn, Loads of Love (Mercury, 1963) – rec. 1962
- Bobbi Humphrey, Flute-In (Blue Note, 1971)
- Illinois Jacquet, Groovin' with Jacquet (Clef, 1956)
- Budd Johnson, French Cookin' (Argo, 1963)
- Jo Jones, Our Man, Papa Jo! (Denon, 1978) – rec. 1977
- Quincy Jones, The Deadly Affair (Original Soundtrack) (Verve, 1967)
- Clifford Jordan, Hello, Hank Jones (Eastworld, 1978)
- Irene Kral, SteveIreneo! (United Artists, 1959)
- Gene Krupa and Buddy Rich, The Drum Battle (Verve, 1960)
- Keiko Lee, Live At "Basie" (Sony, 2006)
- Mel Lewis, Mel Lewis and Friends (A&M/Horizon, 1977)
- Abbey Lincoln, You Gotta Pay the Band (Verve, 1991)
- Curtis Lundy, Just Be Yourself (New Note, 1987)
- Kevin Mahogany, An Evening of Ballads (Live) (Mahogany Jazz, 2024)
- Herbie Mann, Salute to the Flute (Epic, 1957)
- Shelly Manne, 2-3-4 (Impulse!, 1962)
- Warne Marsh, Star Highs (Criss Cross Jazz, 1982)
- Mat Mathews, Eddie Costa, Mat Mathews & Don Elliott at Newport (Verve, 1957)
- Christian McBride, Conversations with Christian (Mack Avenue, 2011)
- Gary McFarland, The Jazz Version of "How to Succeed in Business without Really Trying" (Verve, 1962)
- Howard McGhee, Howard McGhee and Milt Jackson (Savoy, 1955)
- Jackie McLean, New Wine in Old Bottles (East Wind, 1978)
- Wes Montgomery, SO Much Guitar! (Riverside, 1961)
- James Moody, Great Day (Argo, 1963)
- Frank Morgan, You Must Believe in Spring (Antilles, 1992)
- Lee Morgan, Introducing Lee Morgan (Savoy, 1956)
- Anita O'Day, All the Sad Young Men (Verve, 1962)
- Specs Powell, Movin' In (Roulette, 1957)
- Buddy Rich and Mel Tormé, Together Again: For the First Time (Gryphon, 1978); reissued as When I Found You (Hindsight Records, 1999)
- Jerome Richardson, Midnight Oil (New Jazz, 1959)
- Nelson Riddle, Phil Silvers and Swinging Brass (Columbia, 1957)
- Charlie Rouse and Paul Quinichette, The Chase Is On (Bethlehem, 1958)
- Jimmy Rushing, Every Day I Have the Blues (BluesWay, 1967)
- A. K. Salim, Flute Suite (Savoy, 1957) also with Frank Wess and Herbie Mann
- Rex Stewart and Cootie Williams, The Big Challenge (Jazztone, 1957)
- Ira Sullivan, The Incredible Ira Sullivan (Stash, 1980)
- Clark Terry and Bob Brookmeyer, Gingerbread Men (Mainstream, 1966)
- Warren Vaché Jr., Iridescence (Concord Jazz, 1981)
- Frank Wess, Opus de Blues (Savoy, 1984)
- Nancy Wilson, But Beautiful (Capitol, 1971)
- Cootie Williams, Cootie Williams in Hi-Fi (RCA Victor, 1958)
- Lem Winchester, Another Opus (New Jazz, 1960)
- Lester Young, Laughin' to Keep from Cryin' (Verve, 1958)
