= The Great Jazz Trio at the Village Vanguard Again =

Live album by The Great Jazz Trio
- Released: 2000
- Recorded: February 19 & 20, 1977
- Venue: Village Vanguard, NYC
- Genre: Jazz
- Length: 51:05
- Label: East Wind; UCCJ-4001
- Producer: Kiyoshi Itoh and Yasohachi Itoh

Hank Jones chronology
The Great Jazz Trio at the Village Vanguard Vol. 2 (1977)	The Great Jazz Trio at the Village Vanguard Again (2000)	Kindness Joy Love & Happiness (1977)

The Great Jazz Trio at the Village Vanguard Again is a live album by the Great Jazz Trio – pianist Hank Jones, bassist Ron Carter and drummer Tony Williams – recorded in 1977 for the Japanese East Wind label but not released until 2000.

== Reception ==
Professional ratings
Review scores
Source	Rating
Allmusic	4/5 stars

Allmusic awarded the album 4 stars, stating: "Hank Jones generously showcases his bandmates, bassist Ron Carter and Tony Williams, rather than relegating them strictly to supporting roles as far too many piano trio leaders have done. Each track is an extended workout."

== Track listing ==
1. "Hi-Fly" (Randy Weston) - 12:02
2. "Sophisticated Lady" (Duke Ellington, Mitchell Parish) - 8:19
3. "Softly, as in a Morning Sunrise" (Oscar Hammerstein II, Sigmund Romberg) - 9:53
4. "Wave" (Antônio Carlos Jobim) - 8:12
5. "My Funny Valentine" (Lorenz Hart, Richard Rodgers) - 12:39

== Personnel ==
- Hank Jones - piano
- Ron Carter - bass
- Tony Williams - drums
