= Just for Fun (Hank Jones album) =

Studio album by Hank Jones
- Released: 1977
- Recorded: June 27–28, 1977
- Studio: Fantasy Studios, Berkeley, CA
- Genre: Jazz
- Length: 39:43
- Label: Galaxy; GXY 5105
- Producer: Ed Michel

Hank Jones chronology
Bop Redux (1977)	Just for Fun (1977)	I Remember You (1977)

Just for Fun is an album by pianist Hank Jones with bassist Ray Brown and drummer Shelly Manne, recorded in 1977 for the Galaxy label.

== Reception ==
Professional ratings
Review scores
Source	Rating
AllMusic	4/5 stars
The Penguin Guide to Jazz	2.5/4 stars

AllMusic awarded the album 4 stars, stating: "the fine interplay between the musicians and the concise and purposeful solos uplift the tunes". The Penguin Guide to Jazz wrote that the album was "consistently disappointing", with Jones's playing lacking the irony necessary for some of the material.

== Track listing ==
1. "Interlude" (J. J. Johnson) – 5:14
2. "A Very Hip Rock & Roll Tune" (Ray Brown) – 4:59
3. "Lullaby" (Hank Jones) – 5:36
4. "Little Rascal on a Rock" (Thad Jones) – 4:02
5. "Bossa Nouveau" (Pepper Adams) – 5:01
6. "Just for Fun" (Sara Cassey) – 7:21
7. "Kids Are Pretty People" (Thad Jones) – 7:30

== Personnel ==
- Hank Jones – piano
- Ray Brown – bass
- Shelly Manne – drums
- Howard Roberts – guitar (track 2, 5 & 7)
