= Let It Happen (disambiguation) =

"Let It Happen" is a 2015 song by Tame Impala.

Let It Happen may also refer to:

- Let It Happen (Jazz Piano Quartet album), 1974
- Let It Happen (MxPx album), 1998
- "Let It Happen", a song by Jimmy Eat World from the 2007 album Chase This Light
- "Let It Happen", a song by Gracie Abrams from The Secret of Us
