= Kindness Joy Love & Happiness =

Studio album by The Great Jazz Trio
- Released: 1977
- Recorded: October 3–4, 1977
- Studios: Warner Brothers Recording Studios, Los Angeles, CA
- Genre: Jazz
- Length: 38:33
- Labels: East Wind; EW-8056
- Producers: Kiyoshi Itoh and Yasohachi Itoh

Hank Jones chronology
Have You Met This Jones? (1977)	Kindness Joy Love & Happiness (1977)	Direct from L.A. (1977)

Kindness Joy Love & Happiness is an album by the Great Jazz Trio—pianist Hank Jones, bassist Ron Carter, and drummer Tony Williams—recorded in 1977 for the Japanese East Wind label.

== Background ==
This is the first studio album that this original and most famous lineup of the Great Jazz Trio made on its own, following three albums recorded live at the Village Vanguard (one of which wasn't released until 2000). The album's title comes from the Los Angeles radio station KJLH.

== Repertoire ==
The album features four modern jazz classics and three originals. The opener is Eddie Harris' "Freedom Jazz Dance" (1965), which was famously recorded by the second Miles Davis Quintet on the album Miles Smiles (1967), on which both Carter and Williams played. It had already been covered more than a dozen other times before this version was recorded. Two other pieces come from iconic jazz albums recorded in 1959: "Mr. P.C." (in reference to the bassist Paul Chambers) by John Coltrane from Giant Steps and "All Blues" by Miles Davis from Kind of Blue. The fourth modern jazz classic is "A Child Is Born" (1969) by Hank Jones' younger brother, the trumpeter and composer Thad Jones. It's played here as a duet between Hank Jones and Carter.

The other three tracks are originals contributed by each of the trio's members. Carter's "Doom" first appeared on another album by the second Miles Davis Quintet, E.S.P. (1965), under the title "Mood."

== Reissues ==
The album has been reissued on CD several times, including on the 4-CD compilation Objects Appear Closer (2007), which collects the four studio trio albums by this lineup of the Great Jazz Trio.

== Reception ==
Professional ratings
Review scores
Source	Rating
AllMusic	3/5 stars

AllMusic awarded the album 3 stars, stating, "Jones, a very flexible pianist able to excel in settings ranging from Fats Waller tributes to post-bop, keeps up with his younger sidemen and comes up with consistently fresh statements full of subtle surprises."

Pianist Ethan Iverson says, "This album succeeds by offering fresh reinventions of the common-practice book" and notes that the trio takes on "the most iconic blues pieces by the most important modern jazz musicians: John Coltrane and Miles Davis" and yet makes "those pieces their own." Iverson also calls this version of "Freedom Jazz Dance" "one of the great Hank Jones performances," with the pianist playing "the tricky melody in both hands like it's nothing," and notes that on "All Blues," Jones "floats on top with a complex harmonization of the theme. I know he liked Ravel; maybe that’s who he's thinking of." Iverson concludes by saying, "I've never heard a better version of brother Thad Jones's most famous ballad."

== Track listing ==
1. "Freedom Jazz Dance" (Eddie Harris) – 4:30
2. "Doom" (Ron Carter) – 4:35
3. "Old Folks" (Tony Williams) – 3:58
4. "Ah, Oui" (Hank Jones) – 6:07
5. "Mr. P.C." (John Coltrane) – 4:12
6. "All Blues" (Miles Davis) – 8:07
7. "A Child Is Born" (Thad Jones) – 7:44

== Personnel ==
- Hank Jones – piano
- Ron Carter – bass
- Tony Williams – drums (except "A Child Is Born")
