= Satin Doll: Dedicated to Duke Ellington =

Studio album by Hank Jones
- Released: 1976
- Recorded: January 24, 1976; Tokyo, Japan
- Genre: Jazz
- Length: 44:15
- Label: Trio; PA-7131

Hank Jones chronology
| Hanky Panky (1975) | Satin Doll: Dedicated to Duke Ellington (1976) | I'm Old Fashioned (1976) |

Satin Doll: Dedicated to Duke Ellington is a solo album by American jazz pianist Hank Jones recorded in 1976 for the Japanese Trio label and released on CD by All Art Jazz in 1991 under the title Solo Piano. The album consists of one side of compositions by Duke Ellington and one of other miscellaneous jazz standards. It was Jones's first solo piano album since Have You Met Hank Jones from 20 years earlier.

== Reception ==
Professional ratings
Review scores
| Source | Rating |
|---|---|
| AllMusic | 3/5 stars |

AllMusic awarded the original release 3 stars (with no written review) and the CD reissue 4 stars, stating, "On this solo piano date, Jones, always a masterful accompanist for singers and a heavily in-demand player for all kinds of recording dates, displays his elegant taste, imagination, and effortless ability to swing throughout this memorable session. Among the highlights are a perky 'Satin Doll' that avoids the predictable clichés, the shimmering 'Sophisticated Lady,' and a somewhat Art Tatum-influenced treatment of 'My Heart Stood Still.'"

== Track listing ==
1. "Just Squeeze Me (But Please Don't Tease Me)" (Duke Ellington, Lee Gaines) - 3:27
2. "In a Sentimental Mood" (Ellington, Manny Kurtz, Irving Mills) - 2:31
3. "Satin Doll" (Ellington, Billy Strayhorn, Johnny Mercer) - 3:37
4. "Prelude to a Kiss" (Ellington, Irving Gordon, Mills) - 3:57
5. "What Am I Here For?" (Ellington, Frankie Laine) - 3:38
6. "Do Nothing Till You Hear from Me" (Ellington, Bob Russell) - 3:37
7. "Sophisticated Lady" (Ellington, Mills, Mitchell Parish) - 2:34
8. "Oh! Look at Me Now" (Joe Bushkin, John DeVries) - 3:12
9. "Alone Together" (Howard Dietz, Arthur Schwartz) - 3:28
10. "Don't Blame Me" (Dorothy Fields, Jimmy McHugh) - 2:53
11. "Gone With the Wind" (Herb Magidson, Allie Wrubel) - 2:30
12. "My Heart Stood Still" (Lorenz Hart, Richard Rodgers) - 2:32
13. "If I Had You" (Irving King, Ted Shapiro) - 2:50
14. "The Very Thought of You" (Ray Noble) - 3:29

== Personnel ==
- Hank Jones - piano
