= You Are There =

You Are There may refer to:

- You Are There (Mono album), 2006
- You Are There (Roberta Gambarini & Hank Jones album), 2007
- You Are There (series), radio and television series
- "You Are There", a song written by Johnny Mandel and Dave Frishberg
