= Milestones (Great Jazz Trio album) =

Studio album by The Great Jazz Trio
- Released: 1978
- Recorded: April 5, 1978
- Studio: Sound Ideas, NYC
- Genre: Jazz
- Length: 38:30
- Label: East Wind; EW-8062
- Producer: Kiyoshi Itoh and Yasohachi Itoh

Hank Jones chronology
Direct from L.A. (1978)	Milestones (1978)	New Wine in Old Bottles (1978)

Milestones is an album by the Great Jazz Trio; pianist Hank Jones, bassist Ron Carter and drummer Tony Williams, recorded in 1978 for the Japanese East Wind label.

== Reception ==
Professional ratings
Review scores
Source	Rating
AllMusic	3/5 stars

Allmusic awarded the album 3 stars and its review by Scott Yanow states, "Excellent advanced modern mainstream music that features the three musicians almost operating as equals".

== Track listing ==
1. "Milestones" (Miles Davis) - 5:14
2. "Lush Life" (Billy Strayhorn) - 6:02
3. "Wave" (Antônio Carlos Jobim) - 7:00
4. "Eighty-One" (Ron Carter) - 5:07
5. "I Remember Clifford" (Benny Golson) - 4:53
6. "Hormone" (Hank Jones) - 3:42
7. "Mr. Biko" (Tony Williams) - 6:32

== Personnel ==
- Hank Jones - piano
- Ron Carter - bass
- Tony Williams - drums
