= Urbanity (album) =

Studio album by Hank Jones
- Released: 1956
- Recorded: September–October 1947 and September 4, 1953; New York City
- Genre: Jazz
- Length: 51:55; CD reissue with bonus tracks
- Label: Clef; MGC 707
- Producer: Norman Granz

Hank Jones chronology
Urbanity (1956)	The Trio (1955)

Urbanity is an album by American jazz pianist Hank Jones featuring solo piano recordings from 1947 and 1953 which was released on the Clef label.

== Reception ==
Professional ratings
Review scores
Source	Rating
AllMusic	3/5 stars
The Penguin Guide to Jazz Recordings	3/4 stars

AllMusic awarded the album 3 stars stating, "Particularly on the unaccompanied solos, Hank Jones shows off the influence of Art Tatum, while the trio cuts are more boppish and sometimes recall the King Cole Trio. Excellent music".

== Track listing ==
All compositions by Hank Jones except as indicated

1. "Thad's Pad" - 2:56
2. "Things Are So Pretty in the Spring" (Hank Jones, Helen Jones) - 3:38
3. "Little Girl Blue" (Richard Rodgers, Lorenz Hart) - 2:45
4. "Odd Number" - 3:30
5. "Blues for Lady Day" - 2:41
6. "The Night We Called It a Day" (Matt Dennis, Tom Adair) - 3:20
7. "Yesterdays" (Jerome Kern, Otto Harbach) - 3:03
8. "You're Blasé" (Ord Hamilton, Bruce Sievier) - 3:06
9. "Tea for Two" (Vincent Youmans, Irving Caesar) - 3:00
10. "The Blue Room" (Rodgers, Hart) - 2:42
11. "Thad's Pad" [Alternative Take 1] - 3:00
12. "Thad's Pad" [False Start and Incomplete Take] - 0:31 "Thad's Pad" [Alternative Take] - 2:58
13. "Thad's Pad" [Alternative Take 2] - 2:58
14. "Things Are So Pretty in the Spring" [Alternative Take 1] (Jones, Jones) - 4:13
15. "Things Are So Pretty in the Spring" [Breakdown Takes 3–6] (Jones, Jones) - 3:19
16. "Things Are So Pretty in the Spring" [Alternative Take 2] (Jones, Jones) - 3:36
17. "Things Are So Pretty in the Spring" [Alternative Take 3] (Jones, Jones) - 3:39

NOTE: tracks 11–17 are bonus track only on CD reissue

== Personnel ==
- Hank Jones - piano solo (tracks 5–10) rec. September–October 1947
- Hank Jones - trio (tracks 1–4 & 11–17) rec. September 1953
- Johnny Smith - guitar
- Ray Brown - bass
- David Stone Martin - LP cover illustration
