= A Night at Boomers, Vol. 1 =

Live album by Cedar Walton
- Released: 1973
- Recorded: January 4, 1973; Boomer's, Greenwich Village, New York City
- Venue: Boomer's
- Genre: Jazz
- Length: 47:25
- Label: Muse; MR 5010
- Producer: Don Schlitten

Cedar Walton chronology
Breakthrough! (1972)	A Night at Boomers, Vol. 1 (1973)	A Night at Boomers, Vol. 2 (1973)

Professional ratings
Review scores
Source	Rating
Allmusic	4.5/5 stars

A Night at Boomers, Vol. 1 (reissued on CD as Naima) is a live album by pianist Cedar Walton recorded in 1973 and released on the Muse label.

== Reception ==
Allmusic awarded the album 4½ stars.

== Track listing ==
All compositions by Cedar Walton except as indicated

1. "Holy Land" – 6:51
2. "This Guy's in Love with You" (Burt Bacharach, Hal David) – 8:11
3. "Cheryl" (Charlie Parker) – 8:41
4. "The Highest Mountain" – 6:22
5. "Down in Brazil" (Roy Burrowes, Beaver Harris) – 6:03
6. "St. Thomas" (Sonny Rollins) – 10:14
7. "Bleecker Street Theme" – 1:03

== Personnel ==
- Cedar Walton – piano
- Clifford Jordan – tenor saxophone (tracks 1 & 3–7)
- Sam Jones – bass
- Louis Hayes – drums
