= Erena Terakubo =

Japanese jazz saxophonist

Erena Terakubo (寺久保エレナ, born April 3, 1992) is a Japanese jazz saxophonist, composer, and bandleader based in the United States. She is known for her work on alto saxophone and for performing internationally as a leader and sideman in contemporary jazz.

== Early life and education ==
Terakubo was born in Sapporo, Hokkaido, Japan. She began playing the alto saxophone at the age of nine and joined the Sapporo Junior Jazz School.

At age 15, she received a scholarship to attend Berklee College of Music's five-week summer program. She later enrolled as an undergraduate, earning an Artist Diploma in 2014 and a bachelor's degree in 2018.

She later completed a Master of Music degree at the Manhattan School of Music in 2023.

== Career ==
Terakubo released her debut album, North Bird, in 2009 while still a high school student. The album featured trumpeter Terumasa Hino and pianist Makoto Ozone. The album reached number one on the Japanese jazz charts and received a Swing Journal Gold Disc award. She was described as having "blazing alto saxophone chops" early in her career.

She subsequently recorded albums including New York Attitude (2011) and Burkina (2013) with Kenny Barron, Christian McBride, Ron Carter, Lee Pearson, and Peter Bernstein.

Early reviews of her recordings noted her command of bebop repertoire and technical facility.

After graduating from Berklee, Terakubo moved to New York City in 2015, where she became active in the jazz scene, performing at venues such as the Blue Note Jazz Club and Dizzy's Club at Jazz at Lincoln Center. She later toured with pianist Kenny Barron's quartet, performing at venues including the Kennedy Center and the Hollywood Bowl.

She was selected to perform at the 2022 International Jazz Day Global Concert, representing Japan.

She has also appeared in U.S. concert presentations, including a performance at Penn Live Arts in Philadelphia.

She has appeared as a member of collaborative ensembles, including the New York–based septet The Empress.

In 2025, Terakubo joined the faculty of Michigan State University as an assistant professor of jazz saxophone.

== Style and influences ==
Terakubo's playing draws on bebop and hard bop traditions and reflects the influence of Charlie Parker, Cannonball Adderley, Phil Woods, and Sonny Stitt.

Her playing has been described as having a strong sense of swing and a mature improvisational approach.

In coverage by public radio station WRTI, Terakubo has been described as a "sparkling torchbearer for the bebop tradition defined by Charlie Parker" .

Pianist John Beasley described her as having "a unique and beautiful voice on the saxophone with one foot in tradition, and the other with a vision for the future."

== Discography ==
=== As leader ===
- North Bird (2009)
- New York Attitude (2011)
- Burkina (2013)
- A Time for Love (2015)
- Little Girl Power (2017)
- Step Forward (2021)
