= Quartet-Quintet =

Studio album by Hank Jones
- Released: 1955
- Recorded: November 1, 1955
- Studio: Van Gelder Studio, Hackensack, New Jersey
- Genre: Jazz
- Length: 40:55
- Label: Savoy; MG 12037
- Producer: Ozzie Cadena

Hank Jones chronology
| The Trio (1955) | Quartet-Quintet (1955) | Bluebird (1956) |

Quartet-Quintet is an album by American jazz pianist Hank Jones recorded in 1955 for the Savoy label.

== Reception ==
Professional ratings
Review scores
| Source | Rating |
|---|---|
| Allmusic | 3/5 stars |
| The Penguin Guide to Jazz | 3.5/4 stars |

Allmusic awarded the album 3 stars. The Penguin Guide to Jazz described the band's "bright, hard-edged sound that is enhanced by a faithful, hiss-free reproduction. A hint of echo in the acoustic adds some depth to spacious uncomplicated arrangements".

== Track listing ==
1. "Almost Like Being in Love" (Frederick Loewe, Alan Jay Lerner) – 4:35
2. "An Evening at Papa Joe's" (Ozzie Cadena) – 15:05
3. "And Then Some" (Cadena) – 7:30
4. "Summer's Gone" (Cadena) – 7:15
5. "Don't Blame Me" (Jimmy McHugh, Dorothy Fields) – 6:30

== Personnel ==
- Hank Jones – piano
- Donald Byrd – trumpet
- Eddie Jones – bass
- Kenny Clarke – drums
- Matty Dice – trumpet (tracks 2 & 3)
