= Hanky Panky (Hank Jones album) =

Studio album by Hank Jones
- Released: 1975
- Recorded: July 14 & 15, 1975
- Studio: Vanguard Studios, New York City, NY
- Genre: Jazz
- Length: 44:27
- Label: East Wind; EW-8021
- Producer: Kiyoshi Itoh and Yasohachi Itoh

Hank Jones chronology
Let It Happen (1974)	Hanky Panky (1975)	Satin Doll: Dedicated to Duke Ellington (1976)

Hanky Panky is an album by American jazz pianist Hank Jones recorded in 1975 for the Japanese East Wind label.

== Reception ==
Professional ratings
Review scores
Source	Rating
Allmusic	3/5 stars
All About Jazz	4/5 stars

Allmusic awarded the album 3 stars, stating: "All in all, an excellent offering from an undisputed master." On All About Jazz John Kelman said: "Jones is as elegant here as always. While totally steeped in the mainstream, he manages to buck convention in the subtlest of ways... Familiar? Yes, but with a sense of adventure that retains a freshness and undeniable sense of discovery."

== Track listing ==
1. "Nothin' Beats an Evil Woman" (Ray Rivera) - 3:48
2. "Warm Blue Stream" (Sara Cassey, Dotty Wayne) - 4:40
3. "Confidence" (Pete Vuolo) - 3:42
4. "Wind Flower" (Cassey) - 5:31
5. "Minor Contention" (Hank Jones) - 4:00
6. "Favors" (Claus Ogerman) - 6:36
7. "As Long as I Live" (Harold Arlen, Ted Koehler) - 5:47
8. "Oh, What a Beautiful Mornin'" (Oscar Hammerstein II, Richard Rodgers) - 5:45
9. "Hanky Panky" (Gary McFarland) - 4:38

== Charts ==
Chart performance for Hanky Panky
Chart (2024)	Peak position
Croatian International Albums (HDU)	37

== Personnel ==
- Hank Jones - piano
- Ron Carter - bass
- Grady Tate - drums
