= Carnaval (Ron Carter album) =

Live album by Ron Carter, Hank Jones, Sadao Watanabe, Tony Williams
- Released: 1983
- Recorded: July 30, 1978
- Venue: Live Under the Sky, Denen Colosseum, Tokyo, Japan
- Genre: Jazz
- Length: 43:18
- Label: Galaxy; GXY-5144
- Producer: Ed Michel

Ron Carter chronology
1 + 3 (1978)	Carnaval (1983)	Pick 'Em (1978)

Hank Jones chronology
Compassion (1978)	Carnaval (1978)	The Great Tokyo Meeting (1978)

Carnaval is a live album by bassist Ron Carter, pianist Hank Jones, saxophonist Sadao Watanabe and drummer Tony Williams which was recorded in Tokyo in 1978 and released on the Galaxy label in 1983.

== Reception ==
Professional ratings
Review scores
Source	Rating
AllMusic	3/5 stars
The Penguin Guide to Jazz Recordings	3/4 stars

The AllMusic review by Jim Todd called it "an exuberant, well-recorded set" and stated: "There is generous solo space for all, with each tune getting a solid workout on this date that definitely manages to share with the listener the excitement generated by the quartet in Tokyo's Denen Coliseum."

== Track listing ==
1. "Chelsea Bridge" (Billy Strayhorn) – 10:12
2. "Manhã de Carnaval" (Luiz Bonfá, Antônio Maria) – 9:01
3. "I'm Old Fashioned" (Jerome Kern, Johnny Mercer) – 8:18
4. "Confirmation" (Charlie Parker) – 6:40
5. "Moose the Mooche" (Parker) – 8:05

== Personnel ==
- Sadao Watanabe – alto saxophone
- Hank Jones – piano
- Ron Carter – bass
- Tony Williams – drums
