= Groovin' High (Hank Jones album) =

Studio album by Hank Jones
- Released: 1978
- Recorded: January 25, 1978
- Studio: Van Gelder Studio Englewood Cliffs, NJ
- Genre: Jazz
- Length: 32:42
- Label: Muse; MR 5169
- Producer: Fred Seibert

Hank Jones chronology
Tiptoe Tapdance (1978)	Groovin' High (1978)	Our Delights (1978)

Groovin' High is an album by pianist Hank Jones recorded in 1978 for the Muse label.

== Reception ==
Professional ratings
Review scores
Source	Rating
AllMusic	4.5/5 stars
DownBeat	4/5 stars

AllMusic awarded the album 4½ stars stating "This is essentially a Bebop jam session, but due to the participation of cornetist/arranger Thad Jones, the music has its surprises".

DownBeat assigned the album 4 stars. Jon Balleras wrote, "Several years ago Jones paid effective homage to his 52nd Street roots on Bop Redux. Groovin’ High, a sister record to that release, recorded with the crisp front line of brother Thad and Charlie Rouse, backed by Sam Jones and Mickey Roker, continues Jones’ delving into bop arcana, drawing heavily on themes by Gillespie and Monk".

== Track listing ==
1. "Algo Bueno" (Dizzy Gillespie) – 3:49
2. "Anthropology" (Charlie Parker, Gillespie) – 5:35
3. "Sippin' at Bells" (Miles Davis) – 4:44
4. "Blue Monk" (Thelonious Monk) – 2:35
5. "Groovin' High" (Gillespie) – 5:25
6. "I Mean You" (Monk) – 5:52
7. "Jackie-ing" (Monk) – 4:42

== Personnel ==
- Hank Jones – piano
- Thad Jones – cornet
- Charlie Rouse – tenor saxophone
- Sam Jones – bass
- Mickey Roker – drums
