= Happenings (Hank Jones and Oliver Nelson album) =

Studio album by Hank Jones and Oliver Nelson
- Released: January 1967
- Recorded: October 19, 20 & 21, 1966
- Genre: Jazz
- Length: 32:42
- Label: Impulse!
- Producer: Bob Thiele

Hank Jones chronology
This Is Ragtime Now! (1964)	Happenings (1967)	Let It Happen (1974)

Oliver Nelson chronology
Sound Pieces (1966)	Happenings (1966)	Encyclopedia of Jazz (1966)

Happenings is an album by American jazz pianist Hank Jones and composer/arranger Oliver Nelson featuring performances recorded in 1966 for the Impulse! label.

== Reception ==
The Allmusic review by Ken Dryden awarded the album 2 stars, stating that "the forgettable sound of the electric harpsichord (an instrument that thankfully didn't catch on, contrary to liner note writer Stanley Dance's prediction that it was here to stay along with earlier electronic instruments) keeps this release from achieving the heights it would have if Jones had only stuck to the piano throughout the sessions. This disc will be sought only by those fans who must have everything Hank Jones has recorded."

Professional ratings
Review scores
Source	Rating
Allmusic	2/5 stars
Allmusic	4.5/5 stars
The Penguin Guide to Jazz Recordings	2/4 stars

== Track listing ==
All compositions by Oliver Nelson except as indicated

1. "Broadwalk Samba" (Johnny Hodges) – 2:56
2. "Winchester Cathedral" (Geoff Stephens) – 2:22
3. "Mas Que Nada (Pow Pow Pow)" (Jorge Ben) – 2:35
4. "Lullaby of Jazzland" (Manny Albam) – 2:32
5. "Jazztime, U.S.A." (Stanley Clayton, George Cates, Jack Pleis) – 2:19
6. "Cul-De-Sac" (Krzysztof Komeda) – 3:09
7. "Happenings" – 3:11
8. "Lou's Good Dues Blues" – 4:21
9. "Fugue Tune" (Traditional) – 4:22
10. "Spy With a Cold Nose" (Riz Ortolani) – 2:13
11. "Funky But Blues" – 2:42

- Recorded in New York City on October 19, 1966 (tracks 5, 6, 10 & 11), October 20, 1966 (tracks 2, 3, 7 & 8), and October 21, 1966 (tracks 1, 4 & 9)

== Personnel ==
- Hank Jones – piano, harpsichord
- Oliver Nelson – arranger, conductor
- Clark Terry – trumpet, vocals
- Joe Newman (tracks 1–4 & 7–9), Ernie Royal, Snooky Young (tracks 1–4 & 7–9) – trumpet
- J. J. Johnson, Jimmy Cleveland, Tom Mitchell, Britt Woodman – trombone (tracks 2, 3, 7 & 8)
- Bob Ashton (tracks 2, 3, 7 & 8), Danny Bank, Jerry Dodgion (tracks 2, 3, 5–8, 10 & 11), Romeo Penque (tracks 5, 6, 10 & 11), Jerome Richardson (tracks 1–4 & 7–9), Phil Woods (tracks 1–4 & 7–9) – woodwinds
- Ron Carter (tracks 5, 6, 10 & 11), George Duvivier (tracks 1–4 & 7–9) – bass
- Ed Shaughnessy (tracks 5, 6, 10 & 11), Grady Tate (tracks 1–4 & 7–9) – drums
- Joe Venuto – percussion (tracks 5, 6, 10 & 11)
