= Art Farmer Quintet at Boomers =

Live album by Art Farmer
- Released: 1976
- Recorded: May 14–15, 1976
- Venue: Boomer's, NYC
- Genre: Jazz
- Length: 45:51/49:00
- Label: East Wind; EW-8042
- Producer: Kiyoshi Itoh & Yasohachi Itoh

Art Farmer chronology
The Summer Knows (1976)	Art Farmer Quintet at Boomers (1976)	On the Road (1976)

Art Farmer Quintet at Boomers is a live album by Art Farmer recorded in New York in 1976 and originally released on the Japanese East Wind label. A second volume of recordings was released in 2003 on the Test of Time label. Clifford Jordan, who had played with Farmer in the Horace Silver quintet in the late 1950s and would appear on several of Farmer's albums in the 1980s, plays tenor saxophone.

== Reception ==
Professional ratings
Review scores
Source	Rating
AllMusic	4/5 stars
The Rolling Stone Jazz Record Guide	3/5 stars

Scott Yanow of AllMusic states, "The group had not rehearsed beforehand but rehearsals were not really needed for these hard bop veterans".

== Track listing ==
Volume One:

1. "Barbados" (Charlie Parker) – 13:01
2. "I Remember Clifford" (Benny Golson) – 10:55
3. "'Round About Midnight" (Thelonious Monk) – 13:20
4. "Will You Still Be Mine" (Matt Dennis, Tom Adair) – 8:30

Volume Two:

1. "Fantasy in "D"" (Cedar Walton) – 11:47
2. "Manhã de Carnaval" (Luiz Bonfá, Antônio Maria) – 12:07
3. "Blues for Amos" (Sam Jones) – 13:54
4. "What's New?" (Johnny Burke, Bob Haggart) – 11:12

== Personnel ==
- Art Farmer – flugelhorn
- Clifford Jordan – tenor saxophone
- Cedar Walton – piano
- Sam Jones – bass
- Billy Higgins – drums
