= New Wine in Old Bottles =

Studio album by Jackie McLean with the Great Jazz Trio
- Released: 1978
- Recorded: April 6–7, 1978
- Studios: Sound Ideas, NYC
- Genre: Jazz
- Length: 40:17
- Labels: East Wind; EW-8057
- Producers: Kiyoshi Itoh and Yasohachi Itoh

Jackie McLean chronology
| Like Old Time (1976) | New Wine in Old Bottles (1978) | Monuments (1979) |

Hank Jones chronology
| Milestones (1978) | New Wine in Old Bottles (1978) | Compassion (1978) |

New Wine in Old Bottles is an album by saxophonist Jackie McLean with the Great Jazz Trio; pianist Hank Jones, bassist Ron Carter and drummer Tony Williams, recorded in 1978 for the Japanese East Wind label.

== Reception ==
Professional ratings
Review scores
| Source | Rating |
|---|---|
| AllMusic | 4.5/5 stars |
| Christgau's Record Guide | A− |
| DownBeat | 5/5 stars |

Reviewing in Christgau's Record Guide: Rock Albums of the Seventies (1981), Robert Christgau called New Wine in Old Bottles "the best McLean album in over a decade" and said, "the saxophonist's work here surpasses that on his European SteepleChase outings because the rhythm section of Hank Jones, Ron Carter, and Tony Williams encourages him to think as fast as he can play, which is plenty fast." The Buffalo News wrote that "McLean plays alto saxophone as if it were tenor—no lissome flash and filigree."

AllMusic awarded the album 4½ stars, stating: "It was an inspired idea to match alto saxophonist Jackie McLean with the Great Jazz Trio, a regularly working unit on record and in concert led by the outstanding pianist Hank Jones, joined by two first call players, bassist Ron Carter and drummer Tony Williams... Jones' advanced playing may be a eye-opener for some fans who do not realize how advanced and wide ranging a pianist he is."

== Track listing ==
All Compositions by Jackie McLean except as indicated

1. "Appointment in Ghana Again" - 5:50
2. "It Never Entered My Mind" (Richard Rodgers, Lorenz Hart) - 6:42
3. "'Round About Midnight" (Monk, Cootie Williams, Bernie Hanighen) - 9:07
4. "Little Melonae Again" - 5:54
5. "Bein' Green" (Joe Raposo) - 6:25
6. "Confirmation" (Charlie Parker) - 6:19

== Personnel ==
- Jackie McLean - alto saxophone
- Hank Jones - piano
- Ron Carter - bass
- Tony Williams - drums
