= The Talented Touch =

Studio album by Hank Jones
- Released: 1958
- Recorded: Spring/Summer 1958; NYC
- Genre: Jazz
- Length: 33:34
- Label: Capitol; T/ST 1044

Hank Jones chronology
Keepin' Up with the Joneses (1958)	The Talented Touch (1958)	Porgy and Bess (1958)

The Talented Touch is an album by American jazz pianist Hank Jones recorded in 1958 for the Capitol label.

== Reception ==
Professional ratings
Review scores
Source	Rating
Allmusic	3.5/5 stars

Allmusic awarded the album 3½ stars stating "The tracks are rather brief, running less than three and a half minutes each, though musicians the caliber of these four gentleman can say a lot more musically in that time frame than most can during a ten-minute performance. Although this album isn't one of Hank Jones' most essential dates as a leader, it is worth purchasing if it can be found". In JazzTimes, Thomas Conrad wrote "The down-the-middle renditions and charming tags and gentle, tinkling flourishes could have been provided by an artist less accomplished than Hank Jones-although not with his polished elegance. If caution renders this session less than indispensable, it is hard to imagine a nicer, more reassuring piano album to come home to after a difficult day at the office".

== Track listing ==
1. "If I Love Again" (Jack Murray, Ben Oakland) - 1:58
2. "My One and Only Love" (Guy Wood, Robert Mellin) - 2:35
3. "Don't Ever Leave Me" (Jerome Kern, Oscar Hammerstein II) - 2:38
4. "It's Easy to Remember" (Richard Rodgers, Lorenz Hart) - 2:45
5. "You Are My Love" (Stanley Bass) - 3:00
6. "Blue Lights" (Gigi Gryce) - 2:58
7. "The Blue Room" (Richard Rodgers, Lorenz Hart) - 2:43
8. "A Sunday Kind of Love" (Barbara Belle, Anita Leonard, Louis Prima, Stan Rhodes) - 2:44
9. "Star Eyes" (Gene de Paul, Don Raye) - 2:49
10. "Let Me Know" (Hank Jones) - 2:30
11. "Try a Little Tenderness" (Jimmy Campbell, Reg Connelly, Harry M. Woods) - 3:33
12. "Easy to Love" (Cole Porter) - 3:21

== Personnel ==
- Hank Jones - piano
- Barry Galbraith - guitar
- Milt Hinton - bass
- Osie Johnson - drums
