= Bluebird (Hank Jones album) =

Studio album by Hank Jones Trio with Guests
- Released: 1956
- Recorded: November 1, 3, 29 and December 20, 1955
- Studio: Van Gelder Studio, Hackensack, New Jersey
- Genre: Jazz
- Length: 42:15
- Label: Savoy; MG 12053
- Producer: Ozzie Cadena

Hank Jones chronology
Quartet-Quintet (1955)	Bluebird (1956)	Have You Met Hank Jones (1956)

Bluebird, also released later as The Trio with Guests (1956) and Hank's Pranks (1962), is an album by American jazz pianist Hank Jones recorded in 1955 for the Savoy label.

== Reception ==
Professional ratings
Review scores
Source	Rating
AllMusic	4/5 stars
The Penguin Guide to Jazz	3/4 stars

AllMusic reviewern Scott Yanow stated: "These relaxed cool jazz performances feature pianist Hank Jones in a variety of settings. ...It's a tasteful set of melodic bop". The Penguin Guide to Jazz commented on Jones's preference for flutes instead of saxophones at this time, and praised Mann's articulation on the title track.

== Track listing ==
1. "Little Girl Blue" (Richard Rodgers, Lorenz Hart) - 5:39
2. "Bluebird" (Charlie Parker) - 14:57
3. "How High the Moon" (Morgan Lewis, Nancy Hamilton) - 6:05
4. "Hank's Pranks" (Hank Jones) - 4:51
5. "Alpha" (Jones) - 5:13
6. "Wine and Brandy" (Frank Foster) - 5:30
7. "Alpha" [Take 2] (Jones) - 5:16 Bonus track on CD reissue
8. "Wine and Brandy" [Take 2] (Foster) - 5:27 Bonus track on reissue

- Recorded at Van Gelder Studio, Hackensack, New Jersey on November 1, 1955 (track 4), November 3, 1955 (tracks 1 & 5–8), November 29, 1955 (track 3) and December 20, 1955 (track 2)

== Personnel ==
- Hank Jones - piano
- Herbie Mann - flute (track 2)
- Jerome Richardson - flute, tenor saxophone (tracks 5–8)
- Donald Byrd (track 4), Matty Dice (track 4), Joe Wilder (track 3) - trumpet
- Wendell Marshall (tracks 1 & 3–8), Eddie Jones (track 2) - bass
- Kenny Clarke - drums
