= Hank Jones' Quartet =

Studio album by Hank Jones
- Released: 1956
- Recorded: August 21, 1956; Van Gelder Studio in Hackensack, New Jersey
- Genre: Jazz
- Length: 36:06
- Label: Savoy; MG 12087
- Producer: Ozzie Cadena

Hank Jones chronology
| Have You Met Hank Jones (1956) | Hank Jones' Quartet (1956) | Gigi (1958) |

Hank Jones' Quartet (full title Hank Jones Trio Plus the Flute of Bobby Jasper and also released as Relaxin' at Camarillo) is an album by American jazz pianist Hank Jones recorded in 1956 for the Savoy label.

== Reception ==
Professional ratings
Review scores
| Source | Rating |
|---|---|
| Allmusic | 4/5 stars |
| Disc | 4/5 stars |

Allmusic awarded the album 4 stars stating "Hank Jones has made many memorable albums over his long career, but this 1956 session with Belgian flutist Bobby Jaspar is one that might easily get overlooked. Jaspar's melodious flute adds some magic ...Jones delivers his usual superb performance, while Paul Chambers has several fine solos, and drummer Kenny Clarke propels the date with his crisp brushwork".

== Track listing ==
1. "Moonlight Becomes You" (Jimmy Van Heusen, Johnny Burke) – 7:08
2. "Relaxin' at Camarillo" (Charlie Parker) – 12:19
3. "Minor Conception" (Hank Jones) – 5:28
4. "Sunday in Savannah" (Hugh Mackay) – 4:37
5. "Spontaneous Combustion" (Cannonball Adderley) – 6:34

== Personnel ==
- Hank Jones – piano
- Bobby Jaspar – flute
- Paul Chambers – bass
- Kenny Clarke – drums
