= Love for Sale (Great Jazz Trio album) =

Studio album by The Great Jazz Trio
- Released: 1976
- Recorded: May 22, 1976; Vanguard Studios, NYC
- Genre: Jazz
- Labels: East Wind; EW-8046
- Producers: Kiyoshi Itoh and Yasohachi Itoh

Hank Jones chronology
I'm Old Fashioned (1976)	Love for Sale (1976)	Jones-Brown-Smith (1976)

Love for Sale is an album by the Great Jazz Trio; pianist Hank Jones, bassist Buster Williams and drummer Tony Williams, recorded in 1976 for the Japanese East Wind label.

== Reception ==
Professional ratings
Review scores
Source	Rating
Allmusic	3/5 stars
DownBeat	4/5 stars

Allmusic awarded the album 3 stars, stating: "this swinging but unsurprising session features boppish interpretations of six jazz standards."

DownBeat assigned the album 4 stars. Reviewer Jon Balleras wrote, "this disk features a carefree, sly Jones infectiously bouncing through six solid standards".

== Track listing ==
1. "Love for Sale" (Cole Porter) - 7:00
2. "Glad to Be Unhappy" (Lorenz Hart, Richard Rodgers) - 6:52
3. "Gee, Baby, Ain't I Good to You" (Andy Razaf, Don Redman) - 6:44
4. "Secret Love" (Paul Francis Webster, Sammy Fain) - 6:07
5. "Someone to Watch Over Me" (George Gershwin, Ira Gershwin) - 6:22
6. "Autumn Leaves" (Jacques Prévert, Joseph Kosma) - 5:50
7. "Tenderly" (Jack Lawrence, Walter Gross) - 6:02 Bonus track on CD reissue

== Personnel ==
- Hank Jones - piano
- Buster Williams - bass
- Tony Williams - drums
