= This Is Ragtime Now! =

Studio album by Hank Jones
- Released: 1964
- Recorded: April 13 & 14, 1964; NYC
- Genre: Jazz
- Length: 35:53
- Label: ABC-Paramount; ABC-496

Hank Jones chronology
Here's Love (1963)	This Is Ragtime Now! (1964)	Happenings (1966)

This Is Ragtime Now! is an album by American jazz pianist Hank Jones featuring interpretations ragtime tunes recorded in 1964 for the ABC-Paramount label.

== Reception ==
Professional ratings
Review scores
Source	Rating
Allmusic	3/5 stars

Allmusic awarded the album 3 stars stating "this trio, which worked as a rhythm section together on countless music dates of many styles during the 1950s and 1960s, obviously had what it took. But Jones is stuck on a campy honky tonk piano instead of a grand piano on the first half of the LP, so the performances tend to sound a lot like the cornucopia of similar records made by pianists not in the leader's league. But the trio makes its best effort and succeeds in spite of the inferior keyboard".

== Track listing ==
1. "Maple Leaf Rag" (Scott Joplin) - 3:06
2. "Cascades" (Joplin) - 2:59
3. "Sunflower Slow Drag" (Joplin) - 3:07
4. "St. Louis Rag" (Tom Turpin) - 3:02
5. "Bohemia" (Joseph Lamb) - 3:10
6. "Eugenia" (Joplin) - 3:26
7. "Sensation Rag" (Lamb) - 3:10
8. "Ragtime Nightingale" (Lamb) - 3:11
9. "The Cannonball" (Joseph Northrup) - 2:38
10. "Contentment Rag" (Lamb) - 2:38
11. "Jazz Mag Rag" (Manny Albam) - 3:03
12. "Bag O' Rags" (Hank Jones) - 2:23

== Personnel ==
- Hank Jones - honky tonk (Tracks #1–6), piano (Tracks #7–12)
- Milt Hinton - bass
- Osie Johnson - drums
