= Tiptoe Tapdance =

Studio album by Hank Jones
- Released: 1978
- Recorded: June 29, 1977 and January 21, 1978; Fantasy Studios, Berkeley, CA
- Genre: Jazz
- Length: 37:20
- Label: Galaxy; GXY 5108
- Producer: Ed Michel

Hank Jones chronology
Direct from L.A. (1977)	Tiptoe Tapdance (1978)	Groovin' High (1978)

Tiptoe Tapdance is a solo album by pianist Hank Jones recorded in 1977 and 1978 for the Galaxy label.

== Reception ==
Professional ratings
Review scores
Source	Rating
AllMusic	3/5 stars
The Penguin Guide to Jazz	3/4 stars
Downbeat	4/5 stars

AllMusic awarded the album 3 stars, stating: "The emphasis is on ballads and his treatments of these songs (which include three religious pieces) are respectful, melodic and lightly swinging. There is not much variety here but the music (within its limitations) is enjoyable".

Downbeat assigned a 4 star rating to the album. Reviewer Chip Stern wrote, "Tiptoe Tapdance is refined and engaging".

== Track listing ==
1. "I Didn't Know What Time It Was" (Lorenz Hart, Richard Rodgers) - 4:20
2. "Emily" (Johnny Mandel, Johnny Mercer) - 3:12
3. "Sweet Lorraine" (Cliff Burwell, Mitchell Parish) - 4:05
4. "Two Sleepy People" (Hoagy Carmichael, Frank Loesser) - 5:37
5. "I'll Be Around" (Alec Wilder) - 1:34
6. "It's Me, O Lord (Standin' in the Need of Prayer)" (Traditional) - 4:57
7. "Love Divine, All Loves Surpassing" (Charles Wesley) - 3:23
8. "Memories of You" (Eubie Blake, Andy Razaf) - 4:51
9. "Lord, I Want to Be a Christian" (Traditional) - 5:21

== Personnel ==
- Hank Jones - piano
