= On the Road (Art Farmer album) =

Studio album by Art Farmer
- Released: 1976
- Recorded: July 26 & 28 and August 16, 1976; Los Angeles, CA
- Genre: Jazz
- Length: 40:48
- Label: Contemporary; S 7636
- Producer: John Koenig and Lester Koenig

Art Farmer chronology
Art Farmer Quintet at Boomers (1976)	On the Road (1976)	Crawl Space (1977)

On the Road is an album by Art Farmer recorded in Los Angeles in 1976 and originally released on the Contemporary label.

== Reception ==
Professional ratings
Review scores
Source	Rating
Allmusic	4/5 stars
The Rolling Stone Jazz Record Guide	3/5 stars
The Penguin Guide to Jazz Recordings	3/4 stars

Scott Yanow of Allmusic states, "Everyone plays up to par on this spirited straight-ahead set".

== Track listing ==
1. "Downwind" (Hampton Hawes) - 7:30
2. "My Funny Valentine" (Lorenz Hart, Richard Rodgers) - 6:57
3. "Namely You" (Gene DePaul, Johnny Mercer) - 6:51
4. "What Am I Here For?" (Duke Ellington, Frankie Laine) - 6:46
5. "I Can't Get Started" (Vernon Duke, Ira Gershwin) - 7:30
6. "Will You Still Be Mine?" (Tom Adair, Matt Dennis) - 5:39

== Personnel ==
- Art Farmer - flugelhorn
- Art Pepper - alto saxophone (tracks 1, 3, 4 & 6)
- Hampton Hawes - piano
- Ray Brown - bass (tracks 1 & 3–6)
- Steve Ellington (tracks 1, 3 & 5), Shelly Manne (tracks 4 & 6) - drums
