= Gigi (Hank Jones album) =

Studio album by Hank Jones
- Released: 1958
- Recorded: January 31, 1958; NYC
- Genre: Jazz
- Length: 25:12
- Label: Golden Crest; CR 3042
- Producer: Arthur Fried

Hank Jones chronology
Hank Jones' Quartet (1956)	Gigi (1958)	Keepin' Up with the Joneses (1958)

Gigi (full title Hank Jones Swings Songs from Lerner and Loewe's Gigi ) is an album by American jazz pianist Hank Jones featuring jazz adaptations of tunes from Alan Jay Lerner and Frederick Loewe's musical romantic comedy film Gigi recorded in 1958 and released on the Golden Crest label.

== Reception ==
Professional ratings
Review scores
Source	Rating
Allmusic	3/5 stars

Allmusic awarded the album 3 stars.

== Track listing ==
All compositions by Frederick Loewe and Alan Jay Lerner

1. "Gigi" - 3:14
2. "I'm Not Young Any More" - 3:37
3. "Thank Heaven for Little Girls" - 2:12
4. "It's a Bore" - 2:58
5. "Say a Prayer for Me Tonight" - 3:07
6. "Gossip" - 2:15
7. "Waltz at Maxim's (She's Not Thinking of Me)" - 2:16
8. "The Parisians" 1:25
9. "I Remember it Well" - 2:30
10. "The Night They Invented Champagne" - 1:38

== Personnel ==
- Hank Jones - piano
- Barry Galbraith - guitar
- Arnold Fishkin - bass
- Donald Lamond - drums
