= Compassion (Hank Jones album) =

Studio album by Hank Jones
- Released: 1978
- Recorded: July 17, 1978; Mirival Studio, Brignoles, France
- Genre: Jazz
- Length: 67:07
- Label: Black & Blue; 33.141

Hank Jones chronology
New Wine in Old Bottles (1978)	Compassion (1978)	Carnaval (1978)

Compassion (also released as Foggy Day) is an album by pianist Hank Jones recorded in France in 1978 for the Black & Blue label.

== Reception ==
Professional ratings
Review scores
Source	Rating
Allmusic	4/5 stars
The Penguin Guide to Jazz Recordings	3/4 stars

Allmusic awarded the album 4 stars, stating: "It's hard to imagine any of these three superb musicians being in anything other than top form, and they do not disappoint."

== Track listing ==
1. "A Foggy Day" (George Gershwin, Ira Gershwin) – 5:28
2. "Angel Face" (Hank Jones) – 6:30
3. "Allan's Allies" (Alan Dawson) – 3:53
4. "Hank's Blues" (Jones) – 6:01
5. "Yours Is My Heart Alone" (Franz Lehár) – 6:31
6. "Compassion" (Milt Hinton) – 8:20
7. "Come to Me" (Milt Jackson) – 6:26
8. "A Foggy Day" [Take 1] (Gershwin, Gershwin) – 4:57 Bonus track on CD reissue
9. "Yours Is My Heart Alone" [Take 2] (Lehár) – 6:26 Bonus track on CD reissue
10. "Come to Me" [Take 1] (Jackson) – 8:26 Bonus track on CD reissue
11. "Alan's Allies" [Take 1] (Dawson) – 4:09 Bonus track on CD reissue

== Personnel ==
- Hank Jones – piano
- George Duvivier – bass
- Alan Dawson – drums
