= Lucky Thompson Plays Happy Days Are Here Again =

Studio album by Lucky Thompson
- Released: 1965
- Recorded: February 16, 1965
- Studio: Van Gelder Studio, Englewood Cliffs, New Jersey
- Genre: Jazz
- Length: 32:00
- Label: Prestige; PR 7394
- Producer: Don Schlitten

Lucky Thompson chronology
Lucky Strikes (1964)	Lucky Thompson Plays Happy Days Are Here Again (1965)	Lucky is Back! (1965)

Lucky Thompson Plays Happy Days Are Here Again is an album led by saxophonist Lucky Thompson recorded in 1965 and released on the Moodsville label.

== Reception ==
Professional ratings
Review scores
Source	Rating
AllMusic	3/5 stars

AllMusic awarded the album 3 stars.

== Track listing ==
1. "Happy Days Are Here Again" (Milton Ager, Jack Yellen) – 5:25
2. "Safari" (Lucky Thompson) – 6:09
3. "Cry Me a River" (Arthur Hamilton) – 4:59
4. "You Don't Know What Love Is" (Gene de Paul, Don Raye) – 5:27
5. "People" (Bob Merrill, Jule Styne) – 4:40
6. "As Time Goes By" (Herman Hupfeld) – 5:20

== Personnel ==
- Lucky Thompson – tenor saxophone, soprano saxophone
- Jack Melady – harp (tracks 2 & 4)
- Tommy Flanagan – piano
- George Tucker – bass
- Walter Perkins – drums
