= The Great Jazz Trio at the Village Vanguard Vol. 2 =

Live album by the Great Jazz Trio
- Released: 1977
- Recorded: February 19 & 20, 1977
- Venue: Village Vanguard, NYC
- Genre: Jazz
- Length: 38:06
- Label: East Wind; EW-8055
- Producer: Kiyoshi Itoh, Yasohachi Itoh

Hank Jones chronology
The Great Jazz Trio at the Village Vanguard (1977)	The Great Jazz Trio at the Village Vanguard Vol. 2 (1977)	The Great Jazz Trio at the Village Vanguard Again (1977)

The Great Jazz Trio at the Village Vanguard Vol. 2 is a live album by the Great Jazz Trio—pianist Hank Jones, bassist Ron Carter and drummer Tony Williams—recorded in 1977 for the Japanese East Wind label.

== Reception ==
Professional ratings
Review scores
Source	Rating
All About Jazz	4.5/5 stars
AllMusic	4/5 stars

AllMusic awarded the album 4 stars, stating: "Jones leads the way with his always elegant boppish arrangements; there are also plenty of solo opportunities for his bandmates in these intimate recordings, which give you the feeling of sitting right in front of the bandstand." On All About Jazz, John Kelman noted: "Carter and Williams had a shared history as part of Miles Davis' more outward-reaching second quintet in the mid-'60s, so they had just the right combination of traditionalism and outside-the-box spontaneity to make this set—consisting of one Charlie Parker tune, one standard, a Davis tune, and a Williams original—a potent blend of reverence and liberated musical thinking."

== Track listing ==
1. "Confirmation" (Charlie Parker) - 9:54
2. "Wind Flower" (Sara Cassey) - 8:16
3. "Nardis" (Miles Davis) - 11:03
4. "Lawra" (Tony Williams) - 8:53

== Personnel ==
- Hank Jones - piano
- Ron Carter - bass
- Tony Williams - drums
