= Yesterday's Thoughts =

Studio album by Art Farmer
- Released: 1976
- Recorded: July 16–17, 1975
- Studio: Vanguard Studios, NYC
- Genre: Jazz
- Length: 44:56
- Label: East Wind; EW-8025
- Producer: Kiyoshi Itoh & Yasohachi Itoh

Art Farmer chronology
A Sleeping Bee (1974)	Yesterday's Thoughts (1976)	To Duke with Love (1975)

Yesterday's Thoughts is an album by Art Farmer recorded in 1975 and originally released on the Japanese East Wind label.

== Reception ==
Professional ratings
Review scores
Source	Rating
AllMusic	4/5 stars

Ken Dryden of AllMusic states, " Don't expect to find this long-unavailable LP quickly or at a bargain price, but it is well worth the effort to acquire it".

== Track listing ==
1. "What Are You Doing the Rest of Your Life?" (Alan and Marilyn Bergman, Michel Legrand) – 9:52
2. "How Insensitive" (Antônio Carlos Jobim, Vinícius de Moraes) – 6:35
3. "Namely You" (Gene de Paul, Johnny Mercer) – 5:58
4. "Alone Together" (Howard Dietz, Arthur Schwartz) – 9:31
5. "Yesterday's Thoughts" (Benny Golson) – 8:02
6. "Firm Roots" (Cedar Walton) – 4:58

== Personnel ==
- Art Farmer – flugelhorn
- Cedar Walton – piano
- Sam Jones – bass
- Billy Higgins – drums
