= Crawl Space (album) =

Studio album by Art Farmer
- Released: 1977
- Recorded: January 1977
- Studio: Van Gelder Studio, Englewood Cliffs, NJ
- Genre: Jazz
- Length: 34:45
- Label: CTI; CTI 7073
- Producer: Creed Taylor

Art Farmer chronology
On the Road (1976)	Crawl Space (1977)	Something You Got (1977)

Crawl Space is a 1977 album by American flugelhornist Art Farmer, released on the CTI label.

== Reception ==
Professional ratings
Review scores
Source	Rating
AllMusic	4/5 stars
The Rolling Stone Jazz Record Guide	2/5 stars

The Bay State Banner noted that, "on 'Petite Bell' Steig gets really funky, Farmer gets very mellow and Gadd drives them both, making this a very beautiful tune."

The AllMusic review stated: "The moody music holds one's interest throughout".

== Track listing ==
1. "Crawl Space" (Dave Grusin) - 8:52
2. "Siddhartha" (Fritz Pauer) - 7:36
3. "Chanson" (Grusin) - 8:36
4. "Petite Belle" (Art Farmer) - 9:41
- Recorded at Van Gelder Studio in Englewood Cliffs, New Jersey in January 1977

== Personnel ==
- Art Farmer - flugelhorn
- Jeremy Steig - flute
- David Grusin - keyboards, arranger (tracks 1 & 3)
- Eric Gale - guitar
- Will Lee - electric bass, gong
- George Mraz - bass (track 2)
- Steve Gadd - drums
- Fritz Pauer - arranger (tracks 2 & 4)
- Bob James - conductor, producer
- Creed Taylor - producer
