= Bluesette (album) =

Studio album by Hank Jones
- Released: 1979
- Recorded: July 22, 1979
- Studio: RAK, London, UK
- Genre: Jazz
- Length: 35:58
- Label: Black & Blue; 33.168

Hank Jones chronology
Trio 1979 Discoveries (1979)	Bluesette (1979)	Chapter II (1980)

Bluesette is an album by pianist Hank Jones recorded at RAK Studio, London in 1979 for the Black & Blue label.

== Reception ==
Professional ratings
Review scores
Source	Rating
Allmusic	4/5 stars
The Penguin Guide to Jazz	3.5/4 stars

Allmusic awarded the album 4 stars stating "Hank Jones is often taken for granted because of his seemingly effortless ability at the piano, but this 1979 trio session with bassist George Duvivier and drummer Alan Dawson (both of whom are also top-flight players) finds him at the top of his game". The Penguin Guide to Jazz described this and I Remember You from the same label as having "a soft and occasionally plangent quality which is highly appealing".

== Track listing ==
1. "Bluesette" (Toots Thielemans) – 5:47
2. "Blue and Sentimental" (Count Basie, Mack David, Jerry Livingston) – 3:10
3. "Milt's Mood" (Cal Tjader) – 5:23
4. "Blues in My Heart" (Benny Carter, Irving Mills) – 7:53
5. "Things Ain't What They Used to Be" (Mercer Ellington, Ted Persons) – 5:28
6. "Azure" (Duke Ellington, Irving Mills) – 7:18
7. "Down" (Miles Davis) – 5:18
8. "St. James Infirmary" (Traditional) – 3:17

== Personnel ==
- Hank Jones – piano
- George Duvivier – bass
- Alan Dawson – drums
