= Lucky Thompson Plays Jerome Kern and No More =

1963 studio album by Lucky Thompson

Studio album by Lucky Thompson
- Released: 1963
- Recorded: March 8, 1963
- Studio: Van Gelder Studio, Englewood Cliffs, New Jersey
- Genre: Jazz
- Length: 33:53
- Label: Moodsville; MVLP 39
- Producer: Don Schlitten

Lucky Thompson chronology
Lord, Lord, Am I Ever Gonna Know? (1961)	Lucky Thompson Plays Jerome Kern and No More (1963)	Lucky Strikes (1964)

Lucky Thompson Plays Jerome Kern and No More is an album led by saxophonist Lucky Thompson recorded in 1963 and released on the Moodsville label.

== Reception ==
Professional ratings
Review scores
Source	Rating
AllMusic	3/5 stars
Down Beat	4.5/5 stars

AllMusic awarded the album 3 stars.

== Track listing ==
All compositions by Lucky Thompson except where noted

1. "They Didn't Believe Me" (Jerome Kern, Herbert Reynolds) – 5:03
2. "Long Ago (And Far Away)" (Kern, Ira Gershwin) – 4:01
3. "Who?" (Kern, Otto Harbach, Oscar Hammerstein II) – 2:44
4. "Why Do I Love You?" (Kern, Hammerstein) – 3:09
5. "Lovely to Look At" (Kern, Dorothy Fields, Jimmy McHugh) – 2:59
6. "Dearly Beloved" (Kern, Johnny Mercer) – 3:32
7. "Look for the Silver Lining" (Kern, Buddy DeSylva) – 2:56
8. "Why Was I Born?" (Kern, Hammerstein) – 3:50
9. "No More" – 5:29

== Personnel ==
- Lucky Thompson – tenor saxophone, soprano saxophone
- Hank Jones – piano
- Wendell Marshall – bass
- Dave Bailey – drums
