= I'm Old Fashioned (album) =

Studio album by Sadao Watanabe with the Great Jazz Trio
- Released: 1976
- Recorded: May 22, 1976
- Venue: NYC
- Studio: Vanguard Studios
- Genre: Jazz
- Length: 44:28
- Label: East Wind; EW-8037
- Producer: Kiyoshi Itoh and Yasohachi Itoh

Sadao Watanabe chronology
Pamoja (1975)	I'm Old Fashioned (1976)	Recital (1977)

Hank Jones chronology
Satin Doll: Dedicated to Duke Ellington (1976)	I'm Old Fashioned (1976)	Love for Sale (1976)

I'm Old Fashioned is an album by Japanese saxophonist Sadao Watanabe with the Great Jazz Trio; pianist Hank Jones, bassist Ron Carter and drummer Tony Williams, recorded in 1976 for the Japanese East Wind label.

== Reception ==
Professional ratings
Review scores
Source	Rating
Allmusic	4.5/5 stars

Allmusic awarded the album 4½ stars, stating: "This LP features Sadao Watanabe at his best."

== Track listing ==
All compositions by Sadao Watanabe except as indicated

1. "Confirmation" (Charlie Parker) - 4:55
2. "Gary" - 4:32
3. "Blues" (Billy Strayhorn) - 5:47
4. "Episode" - 6:36
5. "I Concentrate on You" (Cole Porter) - 5:57
6. "Chelsea Bridge" (Strayhorn) - 5:52
7. "I'm Old Fashioned" (Jerome Kern, Johnny Mercer) - 8:11
8. "One for C" - 2:38

== Personnel ==
- Sadao Watanabe - alto saxophone, flute
- Hank Jones - piano
- Ron Carter - bass
- Tony Williams - drums
