= Boomer's =

Former jazz club in New York City

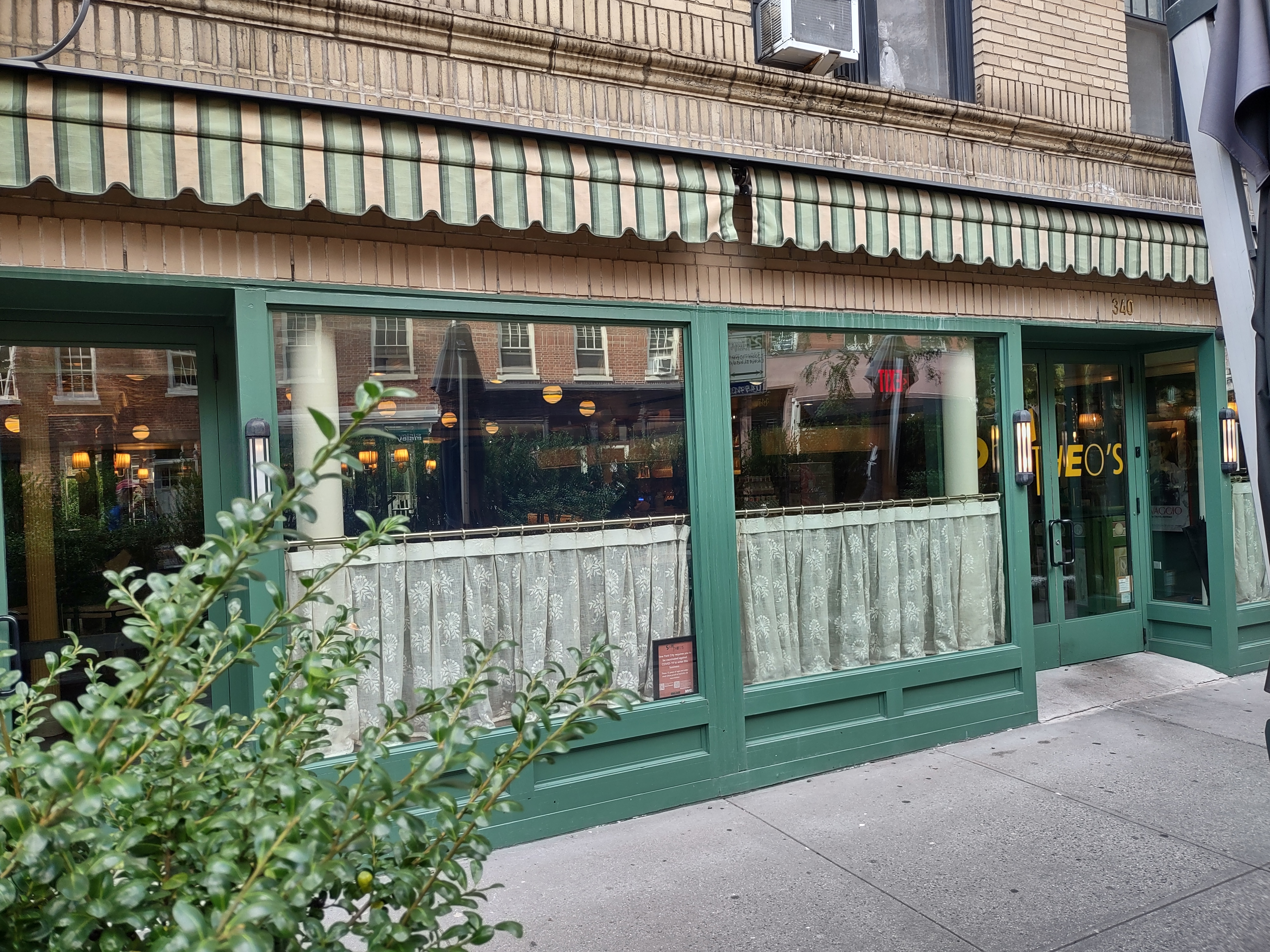
- Former Boomer's venue in 2023.
- Interactive map of Boomer's
- Address: 340 Bleecker St; New York, NY 10014
- Coordinates: 40.734364°N 74.004684°W
- Event: Jazz

Boomer's was a jazz club in Greenwich Village, New York City, during the 1970s. The club was a venue for bebop music. Musicians including Barry Harris, Kenny Barron, Art Farmer, and Cedar Walton played the club, and live albums including Walton's A Night at Boomers, Vol. 1 and A Night at Boomers, Vol. 2, and Art Farmer Quintet at Boomers were recorded at the club. After Boomer's closed, the space was the location of Manatus, a Greek diner, for three decades.

== See also ==
- List of jazz venues in the United States
