= Have You Met This Jones? =

Studio album by Hank Jones
- Released: 1978
- Recorded: August 1–2, 1977
- Studios: MPS Studio in Villingen, West Germany
- Genre: Jazz
- Length: 44:42
- Labels: MPS; MPS 15506
- Producer: Hans Georg Brunner-Schwer

Hank Jones chronology
| I Remember You (1977) | Have You Met This Jones? (1978) | Kindness Joy Love & Happiness (1977) |

Have You Met This Jones? is an album by pianist Hank Jones recorded in Germany in 1977 for the MPS label and released in 1978.

== Reception ==
Professional ratings
Review scores
| Source | Rating |
|---|---|
| Allmusic | 3/5 stars |
| Downbeat | 3/5 stars |

Allmusic awarded the album 3 stars.

Downbeat assigned a 3 star rating to the album. Reviewer Douglas Clark wrote, "He plays ballads like he was holding a tight rein on a frisky horse. But when he is in the groove, few folks swing as well as Hank Jones".

== Track listing ==
1. "There's a Small Hotel" (Richard Rodgers, Lorenz Hart) - 5:06
2. "Portions" (Thad Jones) - 7:40
3. "The Oregon Grinder" (Jerry Dodgion) - 4:27
4. "I Got It Bad and That Ain't Good" (Duke Ellington) - 5:16
5. "We're All Together" (Hank Jones) - 5:49
6. "Like Someone in Love" (Jimmy Van Heusen, Johnny Burke) - 4:37
7. "Now's the Time" (Charlie Parker) - 5:22
8. "Robbins Nest" (Illinois Jacquet, Charles Thompson) - 6:27

== Personnel ==
- Hank Jones - piano
- Isla Eckinger - bass
- Kurt Bong - drums
