= Lucky Strikes (album) =

Studio album by Lucky Thompson
- Released: 1965
- Recorded: September 15, 1964
- Studio: Van Gelder Studio, Englewood Cliffs, New Jersey
- Genre: Jazz
- Length: 39:25
- Label: Prestige; PR 7365
- Producer: Don Schlitten

Lucky Thompson chronology
Lucky Thompson Plays Jerome Kern and No More (1963)	Lucky Strikes (1965)	Lucky Thompson Plays Happy Days Are Here Again (1965)

Lucky Strikes is an album led by saxophonist Lucky Thompson recorded in 1964 and released on the Prestige label. The title and cover art are modelled after the cigarette brand Lucky Strikes.

== Reception ==
Professional ratings
Review scores
Source	Rating
AllMusic	4.5/5 stars
The Penguin Guide to Jazz Recordings	4/4 stars

AllMusic awarded the album 4½ stars with its review by Scott Yanow calling it, "a perfect introduction to the talents of the underrated saxophonist Lucky Thompson... the quality is quite high. Thompson's soprano solos in particular are quite memorable".

== Track listing ==
All compositions by Lucky Thompson except as noted

1. "In a Sentimental Mood" (Duke Ellington, Irving Mills) – 5:49
2. "Fly With the Wind" – 4:01
3. "Mid-Nite Oil" – 5:08
4. "Reminiscent" – 4:04
5. "Mumba Neua" – 4:47
6. "I Forgot to Remember" – 6:36
7. "Prey-Loot" – 4:05
8. "Invitation" (Bronisław Kaper) – 4:55

== Personnel ==
- Lucky Thompson – tenor saxophone, soprano saxophone
- Hank Jones – piano
- Richard Davis – bass
- Connie Kay – drums
