= A Night at Boomers, Vol. 2 =

Live album by Cedar Walton
- Released: 1973
- Recorded: January 4, 1973; Boomer's, Greenwich Village, New York City
- Venue: Boomer's
- Genre: Jazz
- Label: Muse; MR 5022
- Producer: Don Schlitten

Cedar Walton chronology
A Night At Boomers, Vol. 1 (1973)	A Night at Boomers, Vol. 2 (1973)	Firm Roots (1973)

Professional ratings
Review scores
Source	Rating
Allmusic	4.5/5 stars

A Night at Boomers, Vol. 2 (partially reissued on the compilation CD Naima – Recorded Live at Boomer's NYC) is a live album by pianist Cedar Walton recorded in 1973 and released on the Muse label.

== Reception ==
Allmusic awarded the album 4½ stars.

== Track listing ==
All compositions by Cedar Walton except as indicated

1. "Naima" (John Coltrane) – 7:49
2. "Stella by Starlight" (Ned Washington, Victor Young) –
3. "All the Way" (Sammy Cahn, Jimmy Van Heusen) – 5:08
4. "I'll Remember April" (Gene de Paul, Patricia Johnston, Don Raye) – 11:06
5. "Blue Monk" (Thelonious Monk) – 11:50
6. " Bleecker Street Theme" – 1:03

== Personnel ==
- Cedar Walton – piano
- Clifford Jordan – tenor saxophone (tracks 2 & 4–6)
- Sam Jones – bass
- Louis Hayes – drums
