= Jones-Brown-Smith =

Studio album by Hank Jones, Ray Brown and Jimmie Smith
- Released: 1977
- Recorded: October 8, 1976
- Studios: Coast Recorders, San Francisco, CA
- Genre: Jazz
- Length: 40:22
- Labels: Concord Jazz; CJ-32
- Producer: Carl Jefferson

Hank Jones chronology
Love for Sale (1976)	Jones-Brown-Smith (1977)	Arigato (1976)

Jones-Brown-Smith (also released as Rockin' in Rhythm) is an album by pianist Hank Jones, bassist Ray Brown and drummer Jimmie Smith, recorded in 1976 for the Concord Jazz label.

== Reception ==
Professional ratings
Review scores
Source	Rating
AllMusic	3/5 stars
The Penguin Guide to Jazz	2.5/4 stars

AllMusic awarded the album 3 stars, stating: "An unusual aspect to the music is that on half of the eight standards Jones switches to electric piano; although he does not display as strong a musical personality on that instrument, he plays quite well." The Penguin Guide to Jazz praised the renditions of "Bags' Groove" and "Spring Is Here", but criticized the selection of other material, and preferred other Jones albums from the same period.

== Track listing ==
1. "Your Feet's Too Big" (Ada Benson, Fred Fisher) - 5:42
2. "Dancing on the Ceiling" (Lorenz Hart, Richard Rodgers) - 5:06
3. "My Ship" (Ira Gershwin, Kurt Weill) - 5:46
4. "Spring Is Here" (Hart, Rodgers) - 3:43
5. "Rockin' in Rhythm" (Duke Ellington, Harry Carney, Irving Mills) - 5:49
6. "Bags' Groove" (Milt Jackson) - 4:22
7. "Alone Together" (Howard Dietz, Arthur Schwartz) - 3:46
8. "The Girl Next Door" (Ralph Blane, Hugh Martin) - 6:08

== Personnel ==
- Hank Jones - piano, electric piano
- Ray Brown - bass
- Jimmie Smith - drums
