= Porgy and Bess (Hank Jones album) =

Studio album by Hank Jones
- Released: 1959
- Recorded: Late 1958; NYC
- Genre: Jazz
- Length: 33:34
- Label: Capitol; T/ST 1175
- Producer: Dave Cavanaugh and Andy Wiswell

Hank Jones chronology
| The Talented Touch (1958) | Porgy and Bess (1959) | Here's Love (1963) |

Porgy and Bess (subtitled Swingin' Impressions by Hank Jones) is an album by American jazz pianist Hank Jones featuring interpretations of music from George Gershwin's opera Porgy and Bess recorded in 1958 for the Capitol label.

== Reception ==
Professional ratings
Review scores
| Source | Rating |
|---|---|
| Allmusic | 3/5 stars |

Allmusic awarded the album 3 stars. On All About Jazz, Franz A. Matzner noted, "Supported by Milt Hinton and Kenny Burrell, as well as brother Elvin's immeasurable percussive abilities, Hank's playing stands out crisply in its almost minimalist approach. Elvin displays a light touch which may contrast with his usual pyrotechnic image, but is here perfectly matched to Hank's deliberative style, enhancing the subdued, intimate feel of this unusually pared down production". In JazzTimes, Thomas Conrad was less enthusiastic and wrote, "Jones' encounters with icons like "Summertime" and "It Ain't Necessarily So" bring no important insights. They are mannered, highly stylized and flawless".

== Track listing ==
All compositions by George Gershwin

1. "Summertime" - 2:34
2. "There's a Boat Dat's Leavin' Soon for New York" - 2:11
3. "My Man's Gone Now" - 3:44
4. "A Woman Is a Sometime Thing" - 2:42
5. "Bess, You Is My Woman Now" - 2:47
6. "It Ain't Necessarily So" - 3:26
7. "I Got Plenty o' Nuttin'" - 2:30
8. "Oh, I Can't Sit Down" - 4:06
9. "Oh Bess, Oh Where's My Bess?" - 3:28
10. "I Ain't Got No Shame" - 2:16

== Personnel ==
- Hank Jones - piano
- Kenny Burrell - guitar
- Milt Hinton - bass
- Elvin Jones - drums, percussion
