= Here's Love (album) =

Studio album by Hank Jones
- Released: 1963
- Recorded: October 19, 1963
- Studio: Van Gelder Studio, Englewood Cliffs, NJ
- Genre: Jazz
- Length: 32:02
- Label: Argo; LP 728
- Producer: Esmond Edwards

Hank Jones chronology
Porgy and Bess (1958)	Here's Love (1963)	This Is Ragtime Now! (1964)

Here's Love is an album by American jazz pianist Hank Jones featuring interpretations of music from Meredith Willson's Broadway musical Here's Love (based on the film "Miracle on 34th Street.") recorded in 1963 for the Argo label.

== Reception ==
Professional ratings
Review scores
Source	Rating
Allmusic	3/5 stars

Allmusic awarded the album 3 stars.

== Track listing ==
All compositions by Meredith Willson

1. "Here's Love" - 2:47
2. "My Wish" - 3:38
3. "You Don't Know" - 3:13
4. "Dear Mister Santa Claus" - 4:00
5. "That Man Over There" - 2:57
6. "Arm in Arm" - 3:48
7. "The Big Clown Balloons" - 2:17
8. "Love, Come Take Me Again" - 2:03
9. "Pine Cones and Holly Berries" - 4:46
10. "My State, My Kansas, My Home" - 2:33

== Personnel ==
- Hank Jones - piano
- Kenny Burrell - guitar
- Milt Hinton - bass
- Elvin Jones - drums
