= The Summer Knows =

Studio album by Art Farmer
- Released: 1977
- Recorded: May 12 & 13, 1976; Vanguard Studios, NYC
- Genre: Jazz
- Length: 34:29
- Label: East Wind; EW-8047
- Producer: Kiyoshi Itoh & Yasohachi Itoh

Art Farmer chronology
To Duke with Love (1975)	The Summer Knows (1977)	Art Farmer Quintet at Boomers (1976)

The Summer Knows is an album by Art Farmer recorded in 1976 and originally released on the Japanese East Wind label.

== Reception ==
Professional ratings
Review scores
Source	Rating
AllMusic	2.5/5 stars
DownBeat	3.5/5 stars
The Rolling Stone Jazz Record Guide	4/5 stars

Scott Yanow of AllMusic states, "The material (which includes such tunes as 'Alfie,' 'When I Fall in Love' and 'I Should Care') is given lyrical treatment by these masterful players on this ballad-dominated date."

== Track listing ==
1. "The Summer Knows" (Alan and Marilyn Bergman, Michel Legrand) – 7:42
2. "Manhã de Carnaval" (Luiz Bonfá, Antônio Maria) – 5:24
3. "Alfie" (Burt Bacharach, Hal David) – 4:55
4. "When I Fall in Love" (Edward Heyman, Victor Young) – 6:13
5. "Ditty" (Art Farmer) – 4:45
6. "I Should Care" (Sammy Cahn, Axel Stordahl, Paul Weston) – 5:30

== Personnel ==
- Art Farmer – flugelhorn
- Cedar Walton – piano
- Sam Jones – bass
- Billy Higgins – drums
