= The Great Jazz Trio at the Village Vanguard =

Live album by the Great Jazz Trio
- Released: 1977
- Recorded: February 19 & 20, 1977
- Venue: Village Vanguard, NYC
- Genre: Jazz
- Length: 36:49
- Label: East Wind; EW-8053
- Producer: Kiyoshi Itoh, Yasohachi Itoh

Hank Jones chronology
Bop Redux (1977)	The Great Jazz Trio at the Village Vanguard (1977)	The Great Jazz Trio at the Village Vanguard Vol. 2 (1977)

The Great Jazz Trio at the Village Vanguard is a live album by the Great Jazz Trio. The Great Jazz Trio is pianist Hank Jones, bassist Ron Carter and drummer Tony Williams, recorded in 1977 for the Japanese East Wind label.

== Reception ==
Professional ratings
Review scores
Source	Rating
All About Jazz	4.5/5 stars
AllMusic	4.5/5 stars
DownBeat	5/5 stars

AllMusic awarded the album 4½ stars, stating: "No matter which edition one hears of the Great Jazz Trio, leader Hank Jones can be counted upon to deliver the goods. ...On this occasion, Jones is ably accompanied by Ron Carter and Tony Williams, so it is no surprise the fireworks begin right away." On All About Jazz, John Kelman noted: "Perhaps it's because, with their shared background as members of Miles Davis' landmark quintet of the mid-'60s, Carter and Williams were able to approach this more mainstream affair with just the right combination of unabashed swing and freer interpretation."

DownBeat's Chip Stern wrote, "Simply, this is an excellent album of uncompromising music by three masters".

== Track listing ==
1. "Moose the Mooche" (Charlie Parker) – 6:06
2. "Naima" (John Coltrane) – 11:41
3. "Favors" (Claus Ogerman) – 9:35
4. "12+12" (Ron Carter) – 9:27

== Personnel ==
- Hank Jones – piano
- Ron Carter – bass
- Tony Williams – drums
