= To Duke with Love =

Studio album by Art Farmer
- Released: 1976
- Recorded: March 5, 1975
- Genre: Jazz
- Length: 40:30
- Label: East Wind; EW-8012
- Producer: Kiyoshi Itoh, Yasohachi Itoh & Yukio Morisaki

Art Farmer chronology
| Yesterday's Thoughts (1975) | To Duke with Love (1976) | The Summer Knows (1976) |

To Duke with Love is an album by Art Farmer featuring compositions associated with Duke Ellington recorded in 1975 and originally released on the Japanese East Wind label.

== Reception ==
Professional ratings
Review scores
| Source | Rating |
|---|---|
| AllMusic | 4.5/5 stars |
| The Rolling Stone Jazz Record Guide | 4/5 stars |

Scott Yanow of AllMusic states, "This tasteful set features Art Farmer at his best".

== Track listing ==
All compositions by Duke Ellington except as indicated.

1. "In a Sentimental Mood" – 7:07
2. "It Don't Mean a Thing (If It Ain't Got That Swing)" (Ellington, Irving Mills) – 5:40
3. "The Star Crossed Lovers" – 7:16
4. "The Brown Skin Gal in the Calico Gown" (Ellington, Paul Francis Webster) – 7:31
5. "Lush Life" (Billy Strayhorn) – 6:28
6. "Love You Madly" – 6:28

== Personnel ==
- Art Farmer – flugelhorn
- Cedar Walton – piano
- Sam Jones – bass
- Billy Higgins – drums
