= Arigato (Hank Jones album) =

Studio album by Hank Jones Trio
- Released: 1977
- Recorded: October 28, 1976; NYC
- Genre: Jazz
- Length: 58:11
- Labels: Progressive; PRO-7004
- Producer: Gus Statiras

Hank Jones chronology
Jones-Brown-Smith (1976)	Arigato (1977)	Bop Redux (1977)

Arigato is an album by pianist Hank Jones, recorded in 1976 for the Progressive label.

== Reception ==
Professional ratings
Review scores
Source	Rating
AllMusic	4/5 stars
DownBeat	3.5/5 stars
The Penguin Guide to Jazz Recordings	3/4 stars

AllMusic awarded the album 4 stars, stating: "Over his many years as a performer, Hank Jones has established himself not only as a major force in jazz piano, but also nonpareil when it comes to the piano trio format. This 1976 recording does absolutely nothing to diminish his matchless status in the annals of that combination."

== Track listing ==
1. "Allen's Alley" (Denzil Best) - 4:48
2. "I'm Old Fashioned" (Jerome Kern, Johnny Mercer) - 5:10
3. "Night Sadness" (Gary McFarland) - 6:27
4. "Arigato" (Hank Jones) - 2:56
5. "Recapitulation" (Jones) - 6:03 Bonus track on CD reissue
6. "Night Flight to Puerto Rico" (Ray Rivera) - 4:27 Bonus track on CD reissue
7. "Double Deal" (Wes Montgomery) - 4:59 Bonus track on CD reissue
8. "Majorca" (Rivera) - 6:54
9. "What Am I Here For?" (Duke Ellington, Frankie Laine) - 5:00
10. "Medley: The Bad and the Beautiful/But Beautiful/You Are Too Beautiful" (David Raksin/Jimmy Van Heusen, Johnny Burke/Lorenz Hart, Richard Rodgers) - 6:15
11. "Gerry's Blues" (Milt Jackson) - 5:09

== Personnel ==
- Hank Jones - piano
- Richard Davis (tracks 1–4, 6 & 8–11) Jay Leonhart (tracks 5 & 7) - bass
- Ronnie Bedford - drums
- Ray Rivera - guitar (tracks 6 & 8)
