= Direct from L.A. =

Studio album by The Great Jazz Trio
- Released: 1978
- Recorded: October 6, 1977
- Studio: Warner Brothers Recording Studios, Los Angeles, CA
- Genre: Jazz
- Length: 28:59
- Label: East Wind; EW-10005
- Producer: Kiyoshi Itoh and Yasohachi Itoh

Hank Jones chronology
Tiptoe Tapdance (1978)	Direct from L.A. (1978)	Milestones (1978)

Direct from L.A. is an album by the Great Jazz Trio featuring pianist Hank Jones, bassist Ron Carter and drummer Tony Williams, recorded using direct metal mastering in 1977 for the Japanese East Wind label.

== Reception ==
Professional ratings
Review scores
Source	Rating
AllMusic	4/5 stars

AllMusic awarded the album 4 stars and its review by Ken Dryden states, "If there's a bone to pick with this well-recorded CD, it is the miserly length of just 29 minutes".

== Track listing ==
1. "A Night in Tunisia" (Dizzy Gillespie, Frank Paparelli) – 8:00
2. "'Round About Midnight" (Thelonious Monk, Cootie Williams, Bernie Hanighen) – 6:13
3. "Satin Doll" (Duke Ellington, Billy Strayhorn) – 8:26
4. "My Funny Valentine" (Richard Rodgers, Lorenz Hart) – 6:20

== Personnel ==
- Hank Jones – piano
- Ron Carter – bass
- Tony Williams – drums
