= The Trio (Hank Jones album) =

Studio album by Hank Jones, Wendell Marshall and Kenny Clarke
- Released: 1956
- Recorded: August 4, 1955; Van Gelder Studio in Hackensack, New Jersey
- Genre: Jazz
- Label: Savoy; MG 12023
- Producer: Ozzie Cadena

Hank Jones chronology
Urbanity (1947-53)	The Trio (1956)	Quartet-Quintet (1955)

The Trio (also released as The Jazz Trio of Hank Jones) is an album by American jazz pianist Hank Jones recorded in 1955 for the Savoy label and released in 1956.

== Reception ==
Professional ratings
Review scores
Source	Rating
Allmusic	4.5/5 stars

AllMusic awarded the album 4½ stars, stating, "This is a superb Hank Jones date; highly recommended for fans of piano trio music. In 1955, most jazz pianists were immersed in the school of Bud Powell. Jones is unique in that he developed his harmonic concept prior to Powell's ascendancy and the bebop revolution, but went on to fully assimilate the melodic vocabulary of bop. He has synthesized important elements from many great players into his own recognizable style. His versatility is evident on these eight selections."

== Track listing ==
1. "We're All Together" (Hank Jones) - 4:06
2. "Odd Number" (Hank Jones) - 4:29
3. "We Could Make Such Beautiful Music Together" (Henry Manners, Robert Sour) - 4:51
4. "Now's the Time" (Charlie Parker) - 3:30
5. "When Hearts Are Young" (Sigmund Romberg, Al Goodman) - 4:16
6. "Cyrano" (Ozzie Cadena) - 5:17
7. "Cyrano" [Alternate Take] (Cadena) - 5:19 Bonus track on reissue
8. "There's a Small Hotel" (Richard Rodgers, Lorenz Hart) - 8:12
9. "My Funny Valentine" (Rogers, Hart) - 5:52

== Personnel ==
- Hank Jones - piano
- Wendell Marshall - bass
- Kenny Clarke - drums
