= I Remember You (Hank Jones album) =

Studio album by Hank Jones
- Released: 1977
- Recorded: July 28, 1977
- Studios: Barclay Studio, Paris, France
- Genre: Jazz
- Length: 64:21
- Labels: Black & Blue; 33.122

Hank Jones chronology
Just for Fun (1977)	I Remember You (1977)	Have You Met This Jones? (1977)

I Remember You is an album by pianist Hank Jones, recorded in Paris in 1977 for the Black & Blue label.

== Reception ==
Professional ratings
Review scores
Source	Rating
AllMusic	4/5 stars
The Penguin Guide to Jazz	3/4 stars

The Boston Globe wrote that Jones "plays with a steady swinging pulse with lots of variations, fluent single note runs, a sharp accent here, a quick change of pace there, a fanciful twist to the melody line or, on Richard Rodgers' 'You Took Advantage of Me', opening with a glittering quick-fingered Art Tatum solo."

AllMusic stated that "this outing features pianist Hank Jones emphasizing the swing side of his flexible musical personality... A fine set." The Penguin Guide to Jazz described this and Bluesette from the same label as having "a soft and occasionally plangent quality which is highly appealing."

== Track listing ==
1. "I Remember You" (Victor Schertzinger, Johnny Mercer) – 2:06
2. "Young No More" (Frank Metis) – 5:52
3. "You Took Advantage of Me" (Richard Rodgers, Lorenz Hart) – 3:12
4. "Love Walked In" (George Gershwin, Ira Gershwin) – 4:58
5. "Dat Dere" (Bobby Timmons) – 7:26
6. "I'll Be Around" (Alec Wilder) – 4:48
7. "Let's Fall in Love" (Harold Arlen, Ted Koehler) – 2:45
8. "Like Someone in Love" (Jimmy Van Heusen, Johnny Burke) – 5:22
9. "Theme from Jobim" (Gerry Mulligan) – 7:27 Bonus track on CD reissue
10. "It's the Talk of the Town"(Jerry Livingston, Marty Symes) – 3:14 Bonus track on CD reissue
11. "Yours Is My Heart Alone" (Franz Lehár) – 6:28 Bonus track on CD reissue
12. "Come to Me" (Milt Jackson) – 6:23 Bonus track on CD reissue

== Personnel ==
- Hank Jones – piano
- George Duvivier – bass
- Oliver Jackson – drums
- Tracks 11 & 12 were recorded on July 18, 1978, in Brignoles, France and feature Alan Dawson as the drummer - originally released on Foggy Day
