= Have You Met Hank Jones =

Studio album by Hank Jones
- Released: 1956
- Recorded: July 9 and August 8 & 20, 1956
- Studio: Van Gelder Studio, Hackensack, NJ
- Genre: Jazz
- Length: 40:25
- Label: Savoy; MG 12084
- Producer: Ozzie Cadena

Hank Jones chronology
Bluebird (1956)	Have You Met Hank Jones (1956)	Hank Jones' Quartet (1956)

Have You Met Hank Jones (also released as Hank Jones Solo Piano) is a solo album by American jazz pianist Hank Jones recorded in 1956 for the Savoy label.

== Reception ==
Professional ratings
Review scores
Source	Rating
Allmusic	4/5 stars

Allmusic stated "Despite being a strong two-handed pianist falling into the transition between swing and bop, Jones tends to sound more swinging in a trio format, although these melodic and sometimes rhapsodic solos are also reasonably enjoyable".

== Track listing ==
1. "It Had To Be You" (Isham Jones, Gus Kahn) - 3:12
2. "Heart and Soul" (Hoagy Carmichael, Frank Loesser) - 3:14
3. "Let's Fall in Love" (Harold Arlen, Ted Koehler) - 3:23
4. "But Not for Me" (George Gershwin, Ira Gershwin) - 2:50
5. "Kankakee Shout" (Hank Jones) - 3:10
6. "Body & Soul" (Johnny Green, Edward Heyman, Robert Sour, Frank Eyton) - 3:37
7. "How About You?" (Burton Lane, Ralph Freed) - 2:28
8. "Gone with the Wind" (Allie Wrubel, Herb Magidson) - 3:15
9. "Teddy's Dream" (Teddy Von Seele) - 3:05
10. "Have You Met Miss Jones?" (Richard Rodgers, Lorenz Hart) - 3:12
11. "You Don't Know What Love Is" (Gene de Paul, Don Raye) - 4:08
12. "Solo Blues" (Jones) - 4:51

== Personnel ==
- Hank Jones - piano
