= Let It Happen (Jazz Piano Quartet album) =

Studio album by Jazz Piano Quartet
- Released: 1974
- Recorded: June 10 & 11, 1974
- Studio: RCA Studio A, New York City, NY
- Genre: Jazz
- Length: 40:53
- Label: RCA
- Producer: Ettore Stratta

Dick Hyman chronology
Some Rags, Some Stomps, and a Little Blues (1973)	Let It Happen (1974)	Satchmo Remembered (1975)

Roland Hanna chronology
1 x 1 (1974)	Let It Happen (1974)	Porgy & Bess (1975)

Marian McPartland chronology
Solo Concert at Haverford (1974)	Let It Happen (1974)	The Maestro and Friend (1974)

Hank Jones chronology
Happenings (1966)	Let It Happen (1974)	Hanky Panky (1975)

Let It Happen is an album by pianists Dick Hyman, Roland Hanna, Marian McPartland, and Hank Jones recorded in 1974 and released by the RCA label.

== Reception ==
Professional ratings
Review scores
Source	Rating
AllMusic	4/5 stars

AllMusic reviewer Ken Dryden stated: "The Jazz Piano Quartet, with pianists Dick Hyman, Roland Hanna, Marian McPartland, and Hank Jones, was a one-time project, with the partial aim by RCA to introduce jazz fans to the wonders of quadraphonic sound ... While many folks think that piano duets often result in train wrecks, the recipe for disaster was even greater with four pianists recorded simultaneously without overdubbing. Other than some very basic charts written by Hyman to serve as a simple guide, all ten performances are improvised without the benefit of a single rehearsal; an even more stunning fact is that everything was nailed on the first take! ... although all four pianists have made many great recordings individually since this 1974 release, they should be very proud of their considerable accomplishments on this very collectable record. Highly recommended!."

== Track listing ==
1. "Lover, Come Back to Me" (Sigmund Romberg, Oscar Hammerstein II) – 2:22
2. "Maiden Voyage" (Herbie Hancock) – 3:55
3. "Let It Happen" (Ettore Stratta) – 4:21
4. "Watch It!" (Dick Hyman) – 3:03
5. "Here's That Rainy Day" (Jimmy Van Heusen, Johnny Burke) – 4:43
6. "Variations on Scott Joplin's "Solace"" (Scott Joplin, Dick Hyman) – 3:38
7. "You Are the Sunshine of My Life" (Stevie Wonder) – 3:45
8. "Improvviso" (Hyman, Hanna, Jones, McPartland: based on a fragment by Erik Satie) – 6:48
9. "Warm Valley" (Duke Ellington) – 3:38
10. "How High the Moon" (Morgan Lewis, Nancy Hamilton) – 3:00

== Personnel ==
- Dick Hyman - piano, arranger
- Roland Hanna, Hank Jones, Marian McPartland - piano
