= Sapporo Junior Jazz School =

Children jazz school in Japan

Coordinates: 43°4′N 141°21′E

The SJF Junior Jazz Orchestra rehearsing for their annual Final Live Concert, February 2013

Sapporo Junior Jazz School is a jazz school for children in Sapporo, Hokkaido, Japan that was founded in 2000. The school has about 60 members between 6 and 16 years old.

== Biography ==
Sapporo Junior Jazz School was founded in Sapporo Art Park and managed by Sapporo Cultural Arts Foundation. The aim of the school is to give children the opportunity to enjoy music and develop self-expression and cooperation through jazz. The school has two big bands, SJF Junior Jazz Orchestra for primary school students and Club SJF for junior high school students.

An audition is held every year to which about 150 children apply. The children practice together every weekend through the year and perform at more than 30 public concerts. The school also organizes workshops with foreign and domestic professional musicians. Club SJF was chosen as goodwill ambassador for Sapporo City Jazz. Since 2006 Club SJF goes abroad every second year, and the band has visited Australia (2006), Canada (2008), China (2010) Norway (2012), Luxembourg (2013) and the U.S. (2014).
