= Roberta Gambarini =

Italian-American jazz singer (born 1964)

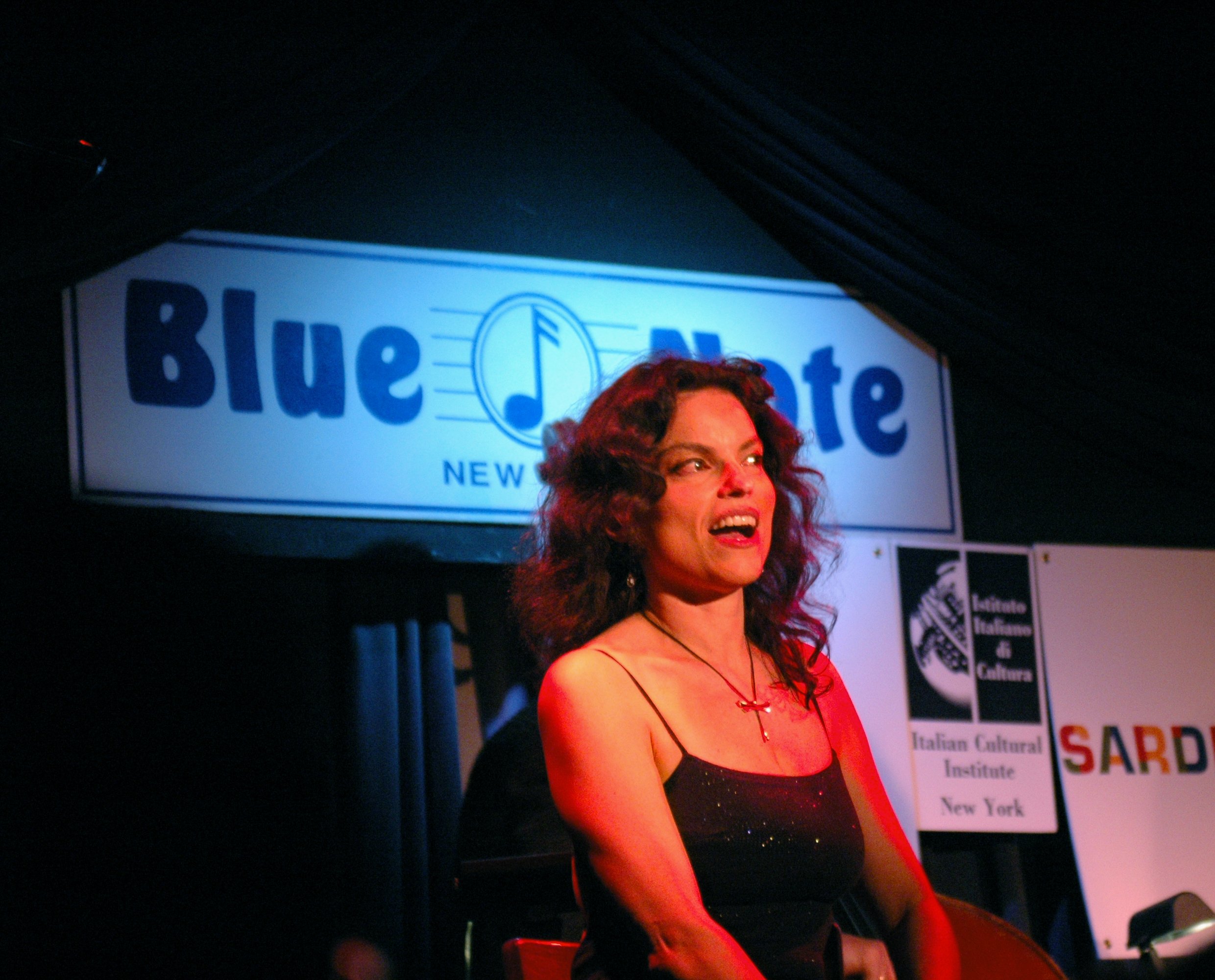
- Gambarini in 2008

Background information
- Born: November 30, 1964; Turin, Italy
- Origin: New York City
- Genres: Jazz; vocal jazz
- Occupation: Singer
- Years active: 1990s–present
- Label: EmArcy
- Website: www.robertagambarini.com

Roberta Gambarini (November 30, 1964) is an Italian-American jazz singer.

== Early life ==
Roberta Gambarini was born in Turin, Italy, where she attended jazz concerts, clubs, and festivals with her parents. Her father played the saxophone, and she grew up hearing jazz in the house and learning by listening to records. Her first instrument was clarinet when she was 12, then piano. When she was 18, she moved to Milan to pursue a career as a vocalist. In Milan she worked in radio and television.

== Musical career ==
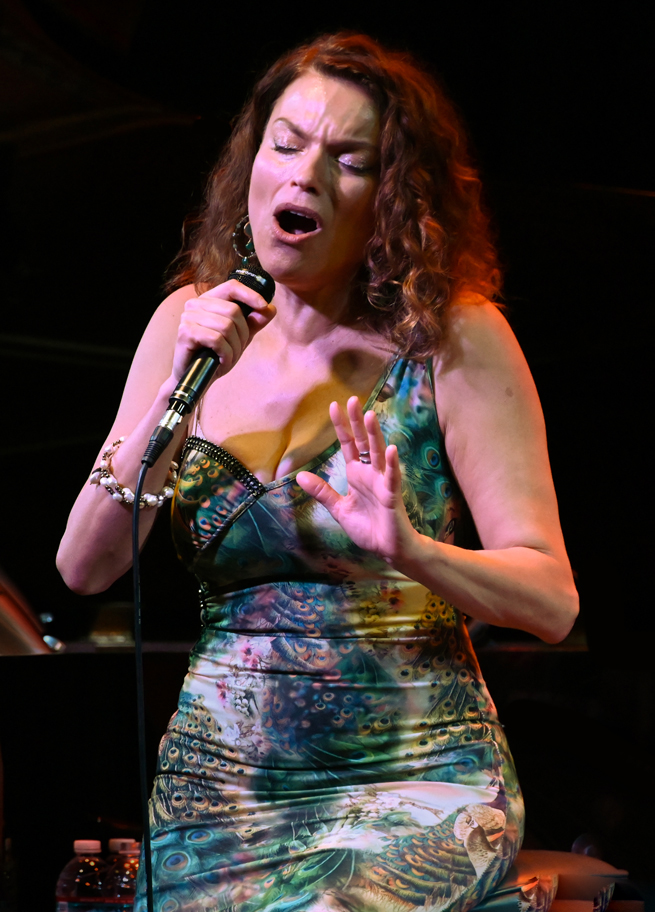
Gambarini performing at Kuumbwa Jazz Center, Santa Cruz, CA, March 25, 2019

Gambarini moved to the US in 1998 and won a scholarship to the New England Conservatory of Music in Boston. A few weeks after her arrival in America, she entered the Thelonious Monk International Jazz Vocals Competition and came in third behind Teri Thornton and Jane Monheit. She was invited to sing in New York City, where she sang with Billy Higgins, Harold Land, Ronnie Matthews, Jimmy Heath, Ben Riley, Curtis Fuller, and Clark Terry. In 1999, she met Benny Carter, who introduced her to the jazz community as his protegee, and shortly after, James Moody. Moody became her teacher, mentor, and friend. Roberta and Moody collaborated extensively in concerts, tours and recordings until his death in 2010.

In 2004, she started touring with the Dizzy Gillespie All Star Big Band, performing with James Moody, John Lee, Frank Wess, Jimmy Heath, Paquito D'Rivera, Mulgrew Miller, Claudio Roditi, and Roy Hargrove. From 2006 to 2007, she toured with her own trio, as well as with the Hank Jones trio.

She sang with Afro-Cuban Jazz Master Chucho Valdes in Europe and the US.

She performed with Dave Brubeck and his quartet on a number of concerts, including the premiere of "Cannery Row Suite", a piece by Brubeck commissioned for the Monterey Jazz Festival where she sang the lead female role of Dora. She was the lead female singer in the 2013 performance of Brubeck's "The Real Ambassadors" at Jazz at Lincoln Center in NYC.

Roberta performed with Roy Hargove for almost two decades, and was the singer with the Roy Hargrove Big Band from 2004 until Hargrove's death in 2018. She sang on his big band album Emergence, released in 2009 for EmArcy Records.

She frequently collaborated with saxophonist-composer-arranger Jimmy Heath who was one of her mentors. She recorded and toured with the Heath Brothers as well as with the Jimmy Heath Big Band.

Her debut album, Easy to Love (Groovin' High, 2006), was nominated for a Grammy Award.

The 2007 album You Are There was a collaboration with Hank Jones.

Her album So in Love was nominated for the Grammy Award for Best Jazz Vocal Album.

== Awards ==
- 2007: Easy to Love, nominated for Grammy Award for Best Jazz Vocal Album
- 2010: So in Love, nominated for Grammy Award for Best Jazz Vocal Album
- 2023: Awarded the title of Chevalier des Arts et des Lettres by the French Ministry of Culture

== Discography ==
=== As leader/co-leader ===
- Apreslude with Antonio Scarano (Splasch, 1991)
- Easy to Love (Groovin' High, 2006) – recorded in 2004
- You Are There with Hank Jones (EmArcy, 2007) – recorded in 2005
- So in Love with James Moody and Roy Hargrove (EmArcy, 2009)
- The Shadow of Your Smile: Homage to Japan (Groovin' High, 2013)
- Connecting Spirits: Roberta Gambarini Sings the Jimmy Heath Songbook (Groovin' High, 2015)
- Dedications: Roberta Gambarini Honors Ella, Sarah & Carmen (Groovin' High, 2019)

=== As guest ===
- Dizzy Gillespie All-Star Band, Dizzy's Business, (MCG Jazz, 2006)
- Dizzy Gillespie All-Star Band, I'm Be Boppin' Too (Half Note, 2009)
- Roy Hargrove Big Band, Emergence (EmArcy, 2009)
- Paul Kuhn, Swing 85 (In+Out, 2013)
- James Moody and Hank Jones, Our Delight (IPO, 2008)
- New Stories, Hope Is in the Air: The Music of Elmo Hope (Origin, 2004)
