= Keiko Lee =

Japanese jazz singer of Korean ethnicity (born 1965)

Keiko Lee (Note: Her Korean name is Lee Kyung-ja (Hangul: 이경자, Yi Gyeong-ja).) (born February 17, 1965) is a Japanese jazz singer of Korean ethnicity. She has performed regularly outside Japan.

== Discography ==
- Imagine (1995)
- Kickin' it with Keiko Lee (1996)
- Beautiful Love (1997)
- If it's Love (1998)
- New York State of Mind (2001)
- Sings Super Standards (2002)
- Vitamin K (2003)
- In Essence (2007)
- Delight (2008)
- Another Side of Keiko Lee (2008)
- Fragile (2009)
- Smooth (2010)
- Love XX (2015)
