= Bop Redux =

Studio album by Hank Jones
- Released: 1977
- Recorded: January 18–19, 1977
- Studios: C.I. Recording Studios, NY
- Genre: Jazz
- Length: 39:09
- Label: Muse
- Producer: Fred Seibert

Hank Jones chronology
Arigato (1976)	Bop Redux (1977)	The Great Jazz Trio at the Village Vanguard (1977)

Bop Redux is an album by pianist Hank Jones, bassist George Duvivier and drummer Ben Riley, recorded in 1977 for the Muse label.

== Reception ==
Professional ratings
Review scores
Source	Rating
AllMusic	4/5 stars
The Penguin Guide to Jazz	3.5/4 stars

AllMusic awarded the album 4 stars, calling it "a set of high-quality explorations of eight bop standards" and stating: "Jones is sensitive on the ballads and lightly but firmly swinging on the more uptempo material. Typically tasteful performances come from one of the greats." The Penguin Guide to Jazz wrote that the Parker pieces were more faithful to the originals than the Monk pieces were, with Jones on the latter tending "to even out the jagged edges of the original themes and turn them into something altogether more polished and entire".

Bop Redux was awarded with a 1977 Grammy nomination for "Best Jazz Performance by a Soloist", one of Jones' nine lifetime nominations.

== Track listing ==
1. "Yardbird Suite" (Charlie Parker) – 5:19
2. "Confirmation" (Parker) – 6:23
3. "Ruby, My Dear" (Thelonious Monk) – 3:52
4. "Relaxin' With Lee" (Parker) – 4:59
5. "Bloomdido" (Parker) – 4:10
6. "'Round Midnight" (Monk, Cootie Williams, Bernie Hanighen) – 6:29
7. "Moose the Mooche" (Parker) – 5:39
8. "Monk's Mood" (Monk) – 2:18

== Personnel ==
- Hank Jones – piano
- George Duvivier – bass
- Ben Riley – drums
