= East Wind Records =

Japanese record label

East Wind was a Japanese jazz record label that was established in Tokyo in 1974.

A second record label named East Wind was established in Hartford, Connecticut, in 1984. The founders were David Barrick, Steve Boulay, Ted Everts, and Gerald A. Friedman. The label concentrated on Russian jazz.

== Discography ==
=== Albums ===
EW	Artist	Title	Recorded
7001 / 8001	Masabumi Kikuchi	East Wind	1974
7002	Dollar Brand	African Breeze	1974
7003	Kohsuke Mine	Out of Chaos	1974
7004	Mikio Masuda	Trace	1974
7005	Takehiro Honda	Salaam Salaam	1974
7006 / 8006	Masahiko Togashi	Song for Myself	1974
7007 / 8007	Ann Burton	By Myself Alone	1974
7008	Terumasa Hino	Speak to Loneliness	1975
7009 / 8009	Cedar Walton	Pit Inn	1974
7010	Sam Jones	Seven Minds	1974
7011	Shunzo Ohno	Something's Coming	1975
7012 / 8012	Art Farmer	To Duke with Love	1975
8013	Masahiko Togashi	Spiritual Nature	1975
8014	Oliver Nelson	Stolen Moments	1975
8015	Air Pocket	Fly On	1975
8016	Terumasa Hino	Live in Concert	1975
8017	Andrew Hill	Hommage	1975
8018	Ronnie Mathews	Trip to the Orient	1975
8019	David Friedman	Winter Love, April Joy	1975
8020	Yoshiaki Masuo	111 Sullivan Street	1975
8021	Hank Jones	Hanky Panky	1975
8022	Sadao Watanabe	Pamoja	1975
8023	Al Haig	Chelsea Bridge	1975
8024	Sheila Jordan	Confirmation	1975
8025	Art Farmer	Yesterday's Thoughts	1975
8026	Don Friedman	Hope for Tomorrow	1975
8027	Ryo Kawasaki	Prism	1975
8028	Shunzo Ohno	Bubbles	1975
8029	Andrew Hill	Blue Black	1975
8030	Reggie Lucas	Survival Themes	1975
8031	Kohsuke Mine	Solid	1975
8032	Andrew Hill	Nefertiti	1976
8033	Tsuyoshi Yamamoto	Daahoud	1975
8034	Joe Lee Wilson	Hey Look at You	1969
8035	Ryo Kawasaki	Eight Mile Road	1976
8036	Junior Mance	Holy Mama	1976
8037	Sadao Watanabe & The Great Jazz Trio	I'm Old Fashioned	1976
8038	Kohsuke Mine	Sunshower	1976
8039	Mikio Masuda	Mickey's Mouth	1976
8040	Lennie Tristano	Descent into the Maelstrom	1976
8041	Terumasa Hino	Hogiuta	1976
8042	Art Farmer	Art Farmer Quintet at Boomers	1976
8043	Masabumi Kikuchi	Wishes / Kochi	1976
8044	Isao Suzuki	Hip Dancin'	1976
8045	Tsuyoshi Yamamoto	Life	1976
8046	The Great Jazz Trio	Love for Sale	1976
8047	Art Farmer	The Summer Knows	1976
8048	Sadao Watanabe	Recital	1976
8050	Walter Bishop, Jr.	Old Folks	1976
8051	Sam Morrison	Dune	1976
8052	Al Haig	Duke 'n' Bird	1976
8053	The Great Jazz Trio	The Great Jazz Trio at the Village Vanguard	1977
8054	Hubert Eaves III	Esoteric Funk	1976
8055	The Great Jazz Trio	The Great Jazz Trio at the Village Vanguard Vol. 2	1977
8056	The Great Jazz Trio	Kindness Joy Love & Happiness	1977
8057	Jackie McLean with The Great Jazz Trio	New Wine in Old Bottles	1978
8060	L.A. Four	Pavane pour une infante défunte	1976
8061	L.A. Four	Going Home	1977
8062	The Great Jazz Trio	Milestones	1978
8063	Laurindo Almeida	Concierto de Aranjuez	1978
8064	The Great Jazz Trio	The Great Tokyo Meeting	1978
8065	Terumasa Hino	Live in Nemuro: Wheelstone	
10001	Joe Sample, Ray Brown & Shelly Manne	The Three	1975
10002	Cedar Walton	The Pentagon	1976
10003	L.A. Four	= EW 8060	1976
10004	L.A. Four	= EW 8061	1977
10005	The Great Jazz Trio	Direct from L.A.	1977
