= You Are There (Roberta Gambarini & Hank Jones album) =

Studio album by Roberta Gambarini & Hank Jones
- Released: August 20, 2007
- Recorded: September 27, 2005
- Genre: Jazz
- Length: 64:04
- Label: EmArcy Records
- Producer: Larry Clothier

Roberta Gambarini chronology
Lush Life (2006)	You Are There (2007)	The Shadow of Your Smile: Homage to Japan (2009)

Hank Jones chronology
Our Delight (2006)	You Are There (2007)	Hank and Frank II (2009)

Professional ratings
Review scores
Source	Rating
AllMusic	4.5/5 stars
All About Jazz	5/5 stars
The Penguin Guide to Jazz Recordings	3/4 stars

You Are There is a collaborative effort between Roberta Gambarini and Hank Jones. It is Gambarini's fourth album.

== Critical reception ==
Suzanne Lorge reviews the album for All About Jazz and gives it 5 out of a possible 5 stars. She says, "This CD promises to be one of the better vocal releases of 2008. Beyond Gambarini's impressive vocals, listeners are advised to pay close attention to Jones' intuitive understanding of phrasing and dynamics."

Ken Dryden at AllMusic begins his review, "Roberta Gambarini is a breath of fresh air among female jazz vocalists. Gifted with superb clear diction, a warm engaging voice, and an uncanny ability to bring out the best in each song, Gambarini shines throughout this one-afternoon session, recorded without isolation booths, splicing, or overdubs. Her sole accompanist is the masterful pianist Hank Jones, a veteran who knows something about inspiring great vocalists with his inventive piano playing, having recorded with Ella Fitzgerald, Billie Holiday, Anita O'Day, and Helen Merrill during a career that began over six decades prior to this session."

Christopher Loudon reviews You Are There for JazzTimes and writes, "This sublime pairing of legendary pianist and destined-to-be-iconic vocalist will be remembered as one of standout albums of the year, perhaps of the decade. Like so many works of genius, it is deceptively simple: two superlative craftspeople matching wits while igniting one another’s imaginations."

== Track listing ==
No.	Title	Writer(s)	Length
1.	"You Are There"	Dave Frishberg; Johnny Mandel	2:44
2.	"Then I'll Be Tired of You?"	Edgar Harburg; Arthur Schwartz	5:04
3.	"People Time"	Benny Carter	2:29
4.	"When Lights Are Low"	Benny Carter; Spencer Williams	4:57
5.	"Deep Purple"	Peter DeRose; Mitchell Parish	5:13
6.	"Reminiscing"	Gigi Gryce; Jon Hendricks	6:03
7.	"Suppertime"	Irving Berlin	3:08
8.	"Just Squeeze Me"	Duke Ellington; Lee Gaines	6:17
9.	"Something to Live For"	Billy Strayhorn	5:13
10.	"Stardust"	Hoagy Carmichael; Mitchell Parish	6:08
11.	"Lush Life"	Billy Strayhorn	4:34
12.	"You're Getting to Be a Habit with Me"	Harry Warren; Al Dubin	3:16
13.	"Come Sunday"	Duke Ellington	4:59
14.	"How Are Things in Glocca Morra?"	Burton Lane; Edgar Harburg	3:59
Total length:			64:04

== Musicians ==
- Roberta Gambarini – vocals
- Hank Jones – piano

== Production ==
- Larry Clothier – Producer
- Al Schmitt – Mixer

Track information and credits adapted from AllMusic and verified from the album's liner notes.

== Charts ==
Chart (2008)	Peak position
US Jazz Albums (Billboard)	26
US Traditional Jazz Albums (Billboard)	15
