= Hank Jones =

American jazz pianist and bandleader (1918–2010)

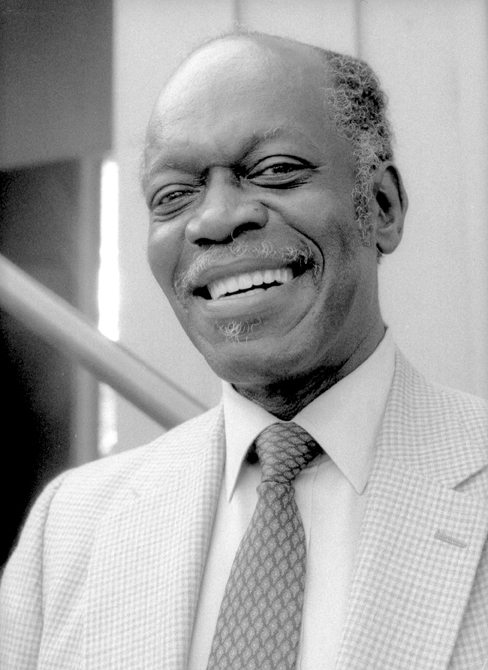
- Jones in 1985

Background information
- Born: Henry Jones Jr. July 31, 1918; Vicksburg, Mississippi, U.S.
- Died: May 16, 2010 (aged 91) New York City, U.S.
- Genres: Jazz
- Occupations: Musician; composer
- Instrument: Piano
- Years active: 1944–2010
- Labels: Verve; Savoy; Epic; Capitol; Argo; Impulse; Concord; Chesky; Sony
- Website: officialhankjones.com
- Relatives: Thad Jones (brother); Elvin Jones (brother)

Henry Jones Jr. (July 31, 1918 – May 16, 2010) was an American jazz pianist, bandleader, arranger, and composer. Critics and musicians have described Jones as eloquent, lyrical, and impeccable. In 1989, The National Endowment for the Arts honored him with the NEA Jazz Masters Award. He was also honored in 2003 with the American Society of Composers, Authors, and Publishers (ASCAP) Jazz Living Legend Award. In 2008, he was awarded the National Medal of Arts. On April 13, 2009, the University of Hartford presented Jones with an honorary Doctorate of Music for his musical accomplishments.

Jones recorded more than 60 albums under his own name and is estimated to have "appeared on over a thousand recordings" as a sideman, including Cannonball Adderley's celebrated album Somethin' Else with Miles Davis. On May 19, 1962, he played piano as actress Marilyn Monroe sang her famous "Happy Birthday, Mr. President" song to then U.S. president John F. Kennedy.

== Early life and career ==
Born in Vicksburg, Mississippi, Henry "Hank" Jones moved to Pontiac, Michigan, where his father, Henry Jones Sr., a Baptist deacon and lumber inspector, bought a three-story brick home. One of ten children, Jones was raised in a musical and religious family. His mother, Olivia Jones, sang; his two older sisters studied piano; and his two younger brothers—Thad, a trumpeter, and Elvin, a drummer—also became prominent jazz musicians. He studied classical piano from an early age with Pauline McCann, developing his technique and learning, as he later put it, to approach music "more clearly and more logically". He named Bach, Chopin, Debussy, and Ravel among his favorite classical composers, all of whom influenced his playing throughout his career.

Even though his father believed that "playing jazz was the work for the devil," in time, Jones also came under the influence of the premier jazz pianists of his early years: Earl Hines, Fats Waller, Art Tatum, and Teddy Wilson. Jones said that Tatum was his "all-time favorite player," and according to a famous anecdote, when he first heard Tatum's ultra-virtuosic recording of "Tiger Rag" (1933), Jones "asked who the three pianists were."

By the age of 13, Jones was performing locally in Michigan and Ohio. While playing with territory bands in Grand Rapids and Lansing in 1944, he met saxophonist Lucky Thompson, who invited Jones to work in New York City at the Onyx Club with Hot Lips Page.

== NYC and bebop ==
In New York City, Jones regularly listened to leading bop musicians, including Bud Powell and Thelonious Monk, and was inspired to master the new style. While practicing and studying the music, he worked with John Kirby, Howard McGhee, Coleman Hawkins, Andy Kirk, and Billy Eckstine. Hawkins made the first recording of Jones' composition "Angel Face" (1947; not to be confused with the later Joe Zawinul piece of the same title), which has gone on to be covered a number of times. Although Jones played only a little on the classic original recording, he later recorded the piece both with Milt Jackson (1956) and as a leader in a trio setting (1978).

In autumn of 1947, Jones began touring in Norman Granz's Jazz at the Philharmonic package, and from 1948 to 1953 he worked as an accompanist for Ella Fitzgerald. As he matured as a soloist and an accompanist, he developed "a harmonic facility of extraordinary taste and sophistication." During this period, he also made several historically important recordings with Charlie Parker, which include "The Song Is You", from the Now's the Time album, recorded in December 1952, with Teddy Kotick on bass and Max Roach on drums.

Engagements with Artie Shaw and Benny Goodman followed as well as recordings with artists such as Lester Young, Cannonball Adderley, and Wes Montgomery. Jones participated in Shaw's final recordings before his retirement, an acclaimed series of small-group sessions. He went on to become the "house pianist" on Savoy, recording a highly regarded trio album for the label in 1955 with bassist Wendell Marshall and drummer Kenny Clarke. Other Savoy projects from this period include recordings with Donald Byrd and Bobby Jaspar. Pianist Ethan Iverson says Jones' Savoy-era dates "showcase some of the most lush pre-Bill Evans comping in jazz and a post-Strayhorn nexus of impressionism and the blues."

== The middle years with CBS ==
From 1959 through 1975, Jones served as staff pianist for CBS studios. He obtained the position through the influence of singer Andy Williams, who admired Jones' playing, and it gave the pianist a steady salary and fringe benefits that performing jazz musicians did not typically have. Jones maintained an extremely busy schedule, rehearsing for and playing on, at various times, The Garry Moore Show, The Jackie Gleason Show, and The Ed Sullivan Show, sometimes accompanying famous singers such as Frank Sinatra.

In 1961, Jones played on the "beautiful near-minimalist" score that Kenyon Hopkins composed for the Paul Newman film The Hustler, which features the alto sax of Phil Woods and includes a solo number for Jones titled "Derby Time". Jones also played the piano accompaniment for Marilyn Monroe as she sang "Happy Birthday, Mr. President" to John F. Kennedy on May 19, 1962. Jones said of the occasion: "She did 16 bars. Eight bars of 'Happy Birthday' and eight bars of 'Thanks for the Memory'. We rehearsed those 16 bars for eight hours. So I think that's something like a half-hour for a bar of music. She was very nervous and upset. She wasn't used to that kind of thing. And I guess who wouldn't be nervous singing 'Happy Birthday' to the president? She actually was a very good singer; however, on this particular occasion I think she was somewhat hampered by having imbibed rather freely. And it was very interesting."

Because of his commitments to CBS, Jones recorded relatively little as a leader during the sixteen years he worked there. During the 1960s, though, he did continue to make jazz recordings as a sideman and accompanist, appearing on albums by notable artists such as guitarist Johnny Smith, tenor saxophonist Ben Webster, and vocalists Johnny Hartman and Nancy Wilson. His broad range and ability to fit in different settings landed him in Broadway stage bands. By the late 1970s, his involvement as a pianist and a conductor with the Broadway musical Ain't Misbehavin' (based on the music of Fats Waller) had, as AllAboutJazz puts it, "informed a wider audience of his unique qualities as a musician."

== Comeback and the Great Jazz Trio ==
During the late 1970s and the 1980s, Jones recorded prolifically for many different labels as an unaccompanied soloist, in duos with other pianists (including John Lewis, Tommy Flanagan, and George Shearing), and with various small ensembles, most notably the Great Jazz Trio, which primarily recorded for the Japanese label East Wind Records. The group was given its name by the company's A&R men in 1976, by which time Jones had already begun working at the Village Vanguard with its original members, bassist Ron Carter and drummer Tony Williams, who had famously been part of the rhythm section of the second Miles Davis Quintet. It was Buster Williams rather than Carter, however, who took part in the trio's first recording session in 1976; but the next seven trio recordings, including three recorded live at the Vanguard in 1977, feature the original lineup. Ethan Iverson notes that Jones, Carter, and Williams "all sound like leaders" in these recordings and that their collaborations "show all three at their best." He also refers to Carter and Williams as "the Rolls-Royce of modern swing."

By 1980, Jones' sidemen in the group were Eddie Gómez and Al Foster, and in 1982 Jimmy Cobb replaced Foster. The trio recorded on its own and with other all-star personnel, such as Art Farmer, Benny Golson, and Nancy Wilson. Jones would continue to record with various iterations of the Great Jazz Trio, including one with Richard Davis and the pianist's brother Elvin, up to the end of his life. Concurrently, he also made many trio recordings under his own leadership, including Bop Redux and I Remember You, both of which received Grammy nominations.

== Final years ==
Jones' "versatility was more in evidence with the passage of time." During his last decades, he recorded with the Meridian String Quartet, accompanied guitar prodigy Emily Remler on two albums, and collaborated on recordings of an Afro-pop ensemble from Mali as well as on two albums of spirituals, hymns, and folksongs with bassist Charlie Haden, titled Steal Away (1995) and Come Sunday (2010).

Other later recordings include various trio albums (notably For My Father from 2005 with bassist George Mraz and drummer Dennis Mackrel), a number of solo piano recordings, and sideman recordings on three albums by saxophonist Joe Lovano. Jones made his debut on Lineage Records, recording with Frank Wess and with the guitarist Eddie Diehl, and also appeared on West of 5th (2006) with Jimmy Cobb and Christian McBride on Chesky Records. In addition, he accompanied vocalists Roberta Gambarini on the acclaimed album You Are There (EmArcy, 2007) and Diana Krall for "Dream a Little Dream of Me" on the album compilation We All Love Ella: Celebrating the First Lady of Song (Verve, 2007). Jones is one of the musicians who test and talk about the piano in the documentary Note by Note: The Making of Steinway L1037, released in November 2007.

Even late in life, Jones continued to practice assiduously: "You have to stay in shape, so I do scales and exercises three or four hours a day, and then I practise sight-reading," he said at the age of 78. Near the end of his career, Jones collaborated with some of the most noted pianists of the upcoming generation, making a two-piano recording of the Ellington/Strayhorn classic "Tonk" with Bill Charlap in 2007 and performing a two-piano concert with Brad Mehldau in Montreal in 2008.

Jones lived in Cresskill, New Jersey, upstate New York, and Manhattan. He died aged 91 at a Calvary Hospital Hospice in The Bronx, New York, on May 16, 2010, survived by his wife Theodosia.

== Style ==
Jones said the following about his own playing: "When you listen to a pianist, each note should have an identity; each note should have a soul of its own. I try to play evenly. I don't take too many excursions. I don't go too far away from the melody, I don't go out into the deep water. I want the listener to understand what I'm doing. I try to stay pretty much right down the middle and yet keep it interesting." The Concord Jazz label, for which Jones recorded various albums as both a leader and a sideman, adds, "Although his sensibility was rooted in the Swing Era ... he had no trouble adapting to bop’s more rigorous harmonic and rhythmic requirements, and evolved a lucid style which ingeniously synthesized swing and bop into an approach that was personal and flexible. He could play with just about anyone."

== Recognition and awards ==
Despite his relatively low-profile career, Jones was highly regarded by his colleagues. Oscar Peterson said his own "roots" went back to Art Tatum and Jones. He also named Jones as one of the great "long-line players" in jazz, along with Bill Evans and Cedar Walton. Ahmad Jamal praised Jones for his "wonderful touch." McCoy Tyner said, "I loved Hank's playing ... his playing was something." Keith Jarrett described Jones' playing as "Tasty. Beyond just tasty. No, it's stimulating. Tasty and stimulating." John Lewis named Jones one of the pianists he listened to most often. André Previn called Jones his favorite pianist, "regardless of idiom." And George Shearing said that Jones was one of his "strongest influences" and that he was "one of the most underrated pianists in the business. He has a beautiful, deep sound, clarity, and a sense of economy. Impeccable taste."

Younger pianists have also expressed their indebtedness to and admiration for Jones, including Kenny Barron, Bill Charlap, Eric Reed, and Geoffrey Keezer, who recorded an album of Jones' compositions for Telarc in piano duos with Barron, Chick Corea, Benny Green, and Mulgrew Miller.

In addition to the honors mentioned above, in 2005, Jones was awarded an Honorary Doctorate of Music from Berklee College of Music at the 20th anniversary of jazz education at the Umbria Jazz Festival in Perugia, Italy.

Grammy history

- Career Wins: 2009: Lifetime Achievement Grammy
- Career Nominations: 5

Hank Jones Grammy Awards History
| Year | Category | Title | Genre | Label | Result |
|---|---|---|---|---|---|
| 1977 | Best Jazz Instrumental Performance – Soloist | "Bop Redux" | Jazz | Muse | Nominee |
| 1980 | Best Jazz Instrumental Performance – Soloist | "I Remember You" | Jazz | Black & Blue | Nominee |
| 1980 | Best Jazz Instrumental Performance – Group | "I Remember You" | Jazz | Black & Blue | Nominee |
| 1995 | Best Jazz Instrumental Solo | "Go Down Moses" | Jazz | Verve | Nominee |
| 1995 | Best Jazz Instrumental Performance – Individual or Group | "Steal Away" | Jazz | Verve | Nominee |
