= Cello Again =

Studio album by Sam Jones
- Released: 1976
- Recorded: January 5, 1976; New York City
- Genre: Jazz
- Label: Xanadu; 129
- Producer: Don Schlitten

Sam Jones chronology
| Seven Minds (1974) | Cello Again (1976) | Double Bass (1976) |

Cello Again is an album by bassist and cellist Sam Jones which was recorded in 1976 and released on the Xanadu label.

== Recording and music ==
The album was recorded on January 5, 1976. The music consists of standards, one composition by Billy Higgins, and two by Jones, including "In Walked Ray", from his 1961 album The Chant.

== Reception ==
Professional ratings
Review scores
| Source | Rating |
|---|---|
| AllMusic | 4/5 stars |

Scott Yanow of AllMusic states, "Bassist Sam Jones, who had not recorded on cello in 14 years at the time of this session, sticks exclusively to that instrument throughout this enjoyable, boppish set".

== Track listing ==
All compositions by Sam Jones except as indicated

1. "In Walked Ray" - 4:48
2. "Old Folks" (Dedette Lee Hill, Willard Robison) - 5:19
3. "Scorpio" - 5:48
4. "Easy to Love" (Cole Porter) - 5:29
5. "Midnight Waltz" (Cedar Walton) - 5:34
6. "Angel in the Night" (Billy Higgins) - 7:19
7. "Au Privave" (Charlie Parker) - 4:53

== Personnel ==
- Sam Jones - cello
- Charles McPherson - alto saxophone
- Barry Harris - piano
- David Williams - bass
- Billy Higgins - drums
