= The Highest Mountain =

Studio album by Clifford Jordan & The Magic Triangle
- Released: 1975
- Recorded: April 18, 1975
- Studio: Trixi Ton Studio, Munich, West Germany
- Genre: Jazz
- Length: 43:50
- Label: SteepleChase; SCS-1047
- Producer: Nils Winther

Clifford Jordan chronology
Firm Roots (1975)	The Highest Mountain (1975)	Remembering Me-Me (1976)

Professional ratings
Review scores
Source	Rating
The Penguin Guide to Jazz Recordings	3/4 stars

The Highest Mountain is an album by saxophonist Clifford Jordan which was recorded in West Germany in 1975 and first released on the SteepleChase label. The album should not be confused with the CD reissue of the Muse album Night of the Mark VII which also used the same title.

== Track listing ==
All compositions by Clifford Jordan except as indicated

1. "Bearcat" - 6:46
2. "Seven Minds" (Sam Jones) – 9:28
3. "Impressions of Scandinavia" – 4:48
4. "Scorpio" [alternate take] (Jones) – 3:45 Bonus track on CD reissue
5. "Firm Roots" [alternate take] (Cedar Walton) – 6:36 Bonus track on CD reissue
6. "The House on Maple Street" (Walton) – 7:35
7. "Miss Morgan" (Jones) – 5:55
8. "The Highest Mountain" – 9:18

== Personnel ==
- Clifford Jordan – tenor saxophone; flute on "Miss Morgan"
- Cedar Walton – piano
- Sam Jones – bass
- Billy Higgins – drums
