= The Trio 2 =

Live album by Cedar Walton
- Released: 1986
- Recorded: March 28, 1985; Sala Europa, Bologna, Italy
- Genre: Jazz
- Length: 47:45
- Label: Red; VPA 193
- Producer: Alberto Alberti

Cedar Walton chronology
The Trio 1 (1985)	The Trio 2 (1986)	The Trio 3 (1985)

The Trio 2 is a live album by pianist Cedar Walton, bassist David Williams and drummer Billy Higgins recorded in 1985 and released on the Italian Red label.

== Reception ==
Professional ratings
Review scores
Source	Rating
AllMusic	4/5 stars
The Penguin Guide to Jazz	3.5/4 stars

AllMusic reviewer Scott Yanow awarded the album 4 stars and called it "an excellent example of Walton's distinctive approach to hard bop".

== Track listing ==
All compositions by Cedar Walton except as indicated

1. "Theme for Ernie" (Fred Lacey) – 11:35
2. "For All We Know" (J. Fred Coots, Sam M. Lewis) – 5:40
3. "Ojos de Rojo" – 7:00
4. "Off Minor" (Thelonious Monk) – 8:55
5. "Bluesville" (Sonny Red) – 5:40
6. "Jacob's Ladder" – 8:55

== Personnel ==
- Cedar Walton – piano
- David Williams – bass
- Billy Higgins – drums
