= Soweto (album) =

Studio album by Billy Higgins
- Released: 1979
- Recorded: January 21, 1979
- Studio: Barigozzi, Milano, Italy
- Genre: Jazz
- Length: 41:29
- Label: Red; VPA141
- Producer: Sergio Veschi and Alberto Alberti

Billy Higgins chronology
Soweto (1979)	The Soldier (1979)

Soweto is the debut album by the American jazz drummer Billy Higgins. It was recorded in 1979 and released on the Italian Red label.

== Reception ==
Professional ratings
Review scores
Source	Rating
AllMusic	4/5 stars
The Penguin Guide to Jazz	3/4 stars
The Virgin Encyclopedia of Jazz	3/5 stars

The AllMusic review by Ron Wynn stated that "this was a welcome entry by a good group that unfortunately didn't work together longer."

== Track listing ==
All compositions by Billy Higgins except as indicated

1. "Soweto – 9:20
2. "Clockwise" (Cedar Walton) – 8:08
3. "Neptune" (Bob Berg) – 5:36
4. "Back to Bologna" (Walton) – 8:05
5. "Bahia, Bahia, Bahia" – 10:20

== Personnel ==
- Billy Higgins – drums, guitar, vocals
- Bob Berg – tenor saxophone
- Cedar Walton – piano
- Tony Dumas – bass
