= Bluesville Time =

Studio album by Cedar Walton Quartet
- Released: 1986
- Recorded: April 21, 1985; Studio 44, Monster, Netherlands
- Genre: Jazz
- Length: 57:23
- Label: Criss Cross Jazz; Criss 1017
- Producer: Gerry Teekens

Cedar Walton chronology
Cedar Walton (1985)	Bluesville Time (1986)	Blues for Myself (1986)

Bluesville Time is an album by pianist Cedar Walton which was recorded in 1985 and released on the Dutch Criss Cross Jazz label.

== Reception ==
Professional ratings
Review scores
Source	Rating
Allmusic	4/5 stars
The Penguin Guide to Jazz	3.5/4 stars

Allmusic rated the album 4 stars. The Penguin Guide to Jazz praised the selection of material, but wrote that "the playing, Higgins apart, isn't quite crisp enough".

== Track listing ==
All compositions by Cedar Walton except as indicated

1. "Rubber Man" - 8:47
2. "Naima" (John Coltrane) - 9:27
3. "Bluesville" (Sonny Red) - 5:44
4. "I Remember Clifford" (Benny Golson) - 9:44
5. "Ojos de Rojo" - 7:10
6. "'Round Midnight" (Thelonious Monk) - 4:46 Bonus track on CD
7. "Without a Song" (Edward Eliscu, Billy Rose, Vincent Youmans) - 11:45 Bonus track on CD

== Personnel ==
- Cedar Walton - piano
- Dale Barlow - tenor saxophone
- David Williams - bass
- Billy Higgins - drums
