= The Trio 3 =

Live album by Cedar Walton
- Released: 1986
- Recorded: March 1986; Milano, Italy
- Genre: Jazz
- Length: 49:59
- Label: Red; VPA 194
- Producer: Alberto Alberti

Cedar Walton chronology
| The Trio 2 (1985) | The Trio 3 (1986) | Cedar Walton (1985) |

The Trio 3 is a live album by pianist Cedar Walton, bassist David Williams and drummer Billy Higgins recorded in 1986 and released on the Italian Red label.

== Reception ==
Professional ratings
Review scores
| Source | Rating |
|---|---|
| AllMusic | 4/5 stars |
| The Penguin Guide to Jazz Recordings | 3.5/4 stars |

AllMusic awarded the album 4 stars stating "It's a rare pleasure to hear Walton playing bop, pure and simple. The trio swings remarkably well here. Walton's touch is rich and dynamic, his voicings slightly spicy, his solo concise."

== Track listing ==
All compositions by Cedar Walton except as indicated

1. "Girl Talk" (Neal Hefti) – 6:00
2. "Fantasy in D" – 9:47
3. "Ground Work" – 5:45
4. "Once I Loved" (Antônio Carlos Jobim) – 5:35
5. "Another Star" (Stevie Wonder) – 8:30
6. "Theme for Red" – 5:47
7. "Relaxin' at Camarillo" (Charlie Parker) – 8:35 Bonus track on CD

== Personnel ==
- Cedar Walton – piano
- David Williams – bass
- Billy Higgins – drums
