= Once More (Billy Higgins album) =

Studio album by Billy Higgins
- Released: 1980
- Recorded: May 25, 1980; Music Center, Bologna, Italy
- Genre: Jazz
- Length: 41:05
- Label: Red; VPA 164
- Producer: Sergio Veschi and Alberto Alberti

Billy Higgins chronology
The Soldier (1979)	Once More (1980)	Mr. Billy Higgins (1984)

Professional ratings
Review scores
Source	Rating
AllMusic	4/5 stars

Once More is the third album led by American jazz drummer Billy Higgins recorded in 1980 and released on the Italian Red label.

== Reception ==
Ken Dryden of AllMusic recommends the album.

== Track listing ==
1. "Plexus" (Cedar Walton) - 7:28
2. "Lover Man" (Jimmy Davis, Ram Ramirez, Jimmy Sherman) - 7:33
3. "Sabiá" (Antonio Carlos Jobim) - 4:26
4. "Amazon" (Bob Berg) - 6:15
5. "Estaté" (Bruno Martino) - 7:07
6. "Horizons" (Manfred Schoof) - 8:16

== Personnel ==
- Billy Higgins - drums
- Bob Berg - tenor saxophone
- Cedar Walton - piano
- Tony Dumas - bass
