= Something in Common (Sam Jones album) =

Studio album by Sam Jones
- Released: September 13, 1977
- Recorded: April 1974 – September 13, 1977
- Studio: C.I. Recording Studios, NYC.
- Genre: Jazz
- Length: 1:02:22
- Label: Muse MR 5149
- Producer: Bob Porter, Cedar Walton

Sam Jones chronology
Changes & Things (1977)	Something in Common (1977)	Visitation (1978)

Alternative cover
- CD cover (32 Jazz label)

Something in Common is a studio album by American jazz bassist Sam Jones, released on September 13, 1977 via the Muse label. The record, with three bonus tracks, was re-released on CD in 2000 and as a digital download in 2009.

== Reception ==
Professional ratings
Review scores
Source	Rating
AllMusic	4.5/5 stars
DownBeat	4.5/5 stars

Alex Henderson of AllMusic wrote: "In the 1970s, Jones' recordings as a leader were quite consistent, and Something in Common is a rewarding example of the type of solid, hard-swinging bop and post-bop that people expected from him. The only Jones piece that the sextet embraces is "Seven Minds"; other selections were written by Hampton ("Every Man Is a King"), Walton ("Something in Common" and the better known "Bolivia"), and Mitchell ("Blue Silver"). A reviewer with All About Jazz stated: "Jones' only original tune from that 1978 album, Seven Minds, opens the CD with one of his ominous solos, backed by Higgins' cymbaled shimmering and Walton's upper-register ornamentation, before Jones leads into an enthralling, charging modal romp that challenges all of the players." Zan Stewart assigned 4.5 stars to the album in DownBeat. He called the release a "superlative, straightforward blowing" session.

== Track listing ==
No.	Title	Writer(s)	Length
1.	"Seven Minds"	Jones	12:16
2.	"Bolivia"	Cedar Walton	7:03
3.	"Something in Common"	Cedar Walton	5:58
4.	"Every Man Is a King"	Slide Hampton	5:11
5.	"For All We Know"	J. Fred Coots, Sam M. Lewis	5:22
6.	"Blue Silver"	Blue Mitchell	5:30
7.	"Shoulders"	Cedar Walton	7:17
8.	"One for Amos"	Jones	6:47
9.	"You Are the Sunshine of My Life"	Stevie Wonder	6:58
Total length:			01:02:22

Three songs, "Shoulders", "One for Amos", and "You Are the Sunshine of My Life", are bonus tracks from the 1974 album, Cedar Walton-Firm Roots, included in later releases.

== Personnel ==
=== Musicians ===
- Sam Jones – bass
- Blue Mitchell – trumpet
- Billy Higgins – drums
- Bob Berg – sax (tenor)
- Slide Hampton – trombone
- Louis Hayes – drums
- Cedar Walton – keyboards, producer, piano

=== Production ===
- Todd Barkan – compilation producer, liner notes
- Tom Copi – photography
- Thomas Hampson – engineer
- Chuck Irwin – engineer
- Gene Paul – mastering
- Bob Porter – original album producer
- Page Simon – cover design
- Dan Mueller – production coordination
