= Early Bird Records =

American record label

- Founded: 1989
- Genre: Jazz
- Country of origin: U.S.
- Location: New York City
- Official website: rainbowjazz.com

Early Bird Records is an independent record label that issues rare recordings.

Bassist Mickey Bass appears on many of the albums, including Sentimental Mood and Another Way Out, sessions which he led. The label also released Mickey B's Juke Box Revue in two volumes.

A notable release by "The Reunion Legacy Band", featuring Gary Bartz, Charles Tolliver, Grachan Moncur III, John Hicks and Mickey Bass.

Cedar Walton's Timeless All-Stars released an album featuring Bobby Hutcherson, Steve Turre and others.

Bobby Timmons' Live at Connecticut Jazz Party (1964) features Sonny Red, Sam Jones and Mickey Bass.

== Discography ==
- EBCD 101: The Timeless All Stars – Time for the Timeless All Stars
- EBCD 102: The Reunion Legacy Band – The Legacy
- EBCD 103: The Mickey Bass Quartet – Another Way Out
- EBCD 104: Bobby Timmons – Live at the Connecticut Jazz Party
- EBCD 105: Mickey Bass & The Co-Operation – Sentimental Mood
- EBCD 106: The Mickey Bass New York Powerhouse Ensemble – Live at the Jazz Corner of the World
