= Animation (disambiguation) =

Animation is the interpolation of frames over a finite period of time. As a discipline, it is practiced with the intent of creating an illusion of movement.

Animation may also refer to:

- Animation (journal), an academic journal
- Animation (Jon Anderson album), 1982
- Animation (Cedar Walton album), 1978
- Animation Magazine, American publication covering the animation industry
- Animation (dance), a style of popping where the dancer imitates stop motion animation

== See also ==
- Animator
- Anime, Japanese animation
- Amination, a process in organic chemistry
- Animotion, a band from Los Angeles, California
- Animism, religious belief that perceives things as animated and alive
