= Half note (disambiguation) =

A half note is a musical note value.

Half note may also refer to:

- Half Note, a 1985 jazz album by Clifford Jordan
- Half Note Records, a jazz label founded in 1998
- Half Note Club, a jazz club in New York City from 1957 to 1974
