= Blues for Myself (Cedar Walton album) =

Studio album by Cedar Walton
- Released: 1986
- Recorded: February 1986
- Studio: Barigozzi Studio, Milan, Italy
- Genre: Jazz
- Label: Red; NS 205

Cedar Walton chronology
| Bluesville Time (1985) | Blues for Myself (1986) | Cedar Walton Plays (1986) |

Blues for Myself is an album by pianist Cedar Walton which was recorded in 1985 and released on the Italian Red label.

== Reception ==
Professional ratings
Review scores
| Source | Rating |
|---|---|
| Allmusic | 4.5/5 stars |
| The Penguin Guide to Jazz | 3/4 stars |

Allmusic rated the album 4.5 stars. The Penguin Guide to Jazz wrote: "Despite Walton's extended bop lines and accompanist's sense of space and shading, it's a rather monochrome set and the piano sounds rather leaden."

== Track listing ==
All compositions by Cedar Walton except where noted.

1. "Blues for Myself" – 3:54
2. "Without a Song" (Edward Eliscu, Billy Rose, Vincent Youmans) – 4:00
3. "Sixth Avenue" – 3:51
4. "Sophisticated Lady" (Duke Ellington) – 3:30
5. "Wonder Why (song)" (Nicholas Brodsky, Sammy Cahn) – 3:53
6. "Little Darlin'" – 5:25
7. "Let's Call This" (Thelonious Monk) – 3:10
8. "Just In Time (song)" (Albert Ammons, Pete Johnson, Cedar Walton) – 5:11
9. "Book's Bossa" (Walter Booker, Cedar Walton) – 5:21
10. "Bridge Work" – 3:28

== Personnel ==
- Cedar Walton – piano
