= Double Bass (album) =

Studio album by Niels-Henning Ørsted Pedersen and Sam Jones
- Released: 1976
- Recorded: February 15 & 16, 1976
- Genre: Jazz
- Length: 55:39
- Label: SteepleChase SCS 1055
- Producer: Nils Winther

Niels-Henning Ørsted Pedersen chronology
Jaywalkin' (1975)	Double Bass (1976)	Pictures (1976)

Sam Jones chronology
Cello Again (1975)	Double Bass (1976)	Changes & Things (1977)

Double Bass is a studio album by jazz bassists Niels-Henning Ørsted Pedersen and Sam Jones, which was recorded in 1976 and released on the Danish SteepleChase label.

== Reception ==
Professional ratings
Review scores
Source	Rating
AllMusic	4/5 stars
The Rolling Stone Jazz Record Guide	4/5 stars
The Penguin Guide to Jazz Recordings	3/4 stars

In his review for AllMusic, Ken Dryden said "Both bassists had played with the formidable pianist Oscar Peterson, so they not only knew something about playing rhythm but were very potent soloists to boot. Pedersen's singing tone contrasts with the darker sound of Jones, though the players nimbly shift roles throughout the sessions. ...This fun date was evidently the only time Niels-Henning Ørsted Pedersen and Sam Jones had the opportunity to work together, but they made the most of it".

== Track listing ==
1. "Falling in Love With Love" (Lorenz Hart, Richard Rodgers) - 6:20
2. "A Notion" (Albert Heath) - 5:38
3. "Giant Steps" (John Coltrane) - 3:43
4. "I Fall in Love Too Easily" (Jule Styne, Sammy Cahn) - 6:16
5. "Miss Morgan" (Sam Jones) - 6:17
6. "Au Privave" (Charlie Parker) - 5:44
7. "Yesterdays" (Jerome Kern, Otto Harbach) - 4:59
8. "Little Train" (Heitor Villa-Lobos) - 5:20
9. "A Notion" [Alternate Take] (Heath) - 5:10 Bonus track on CD reissue
10. "Miss Morgan" [Alternate Take] (Jones) - 5:58 Bonus track on CD reissue

== Personnel ==
- Niels-Henning Ørsted Pedersen, Sam Jones - bass
- Philip Catherine - guitar
- Billy Higgins - drums
- Albert Heath - percussion (tracks 2, 4, 8 & 9)
