= Soul Society =

Soul Society may refer to:

- Soul Society, a fictional location in the manga series Bleach
- "Soul Society", a song by Kamelot from the 2005 album The Black Halo
- The Soul Society, the 1960 debut album by Sam Jones

== See also ==
- Society of Soul, a member of the group of bands Dungeon Family
