= Manhattan Afternoon =

Studio album by Cedar Walton Trio
- Released: 1994
- Recorded: December 26, 1992
- Studio: RPM Studio NYC
- Genre: Jazz
- Length: 56:30
- Label: Criss Cross Jazz; Criss 1082
- Producer: Gerry Teekens

Cedar Walton chronology
Simple Pleasure (1992)	Manhattan Afternoon (1994)	Just One of Those Nights at the Village Vanguard (1994)

Manhattan Afternoon is an album by pianist Cedar Walton which was recorded in 1992 and released on the Dutch Criss Cross Jazz label.

== Reception ==
Professional ratings
Review scores
Source	Rating
AllMusic	4/5 stars
The Penguin Guide to Jazz Recordings	4/4 stars

AllMusic rated the album 4 stars.

== Track listing ==
All compositions by Cedar Walton except as indicated

1. "There Is No Greater Love" (Isham Jones, Marty Symes) – 8:57
2. "St. Thomas" (Sonny Rollins) – 7:27
3. "Skylark" (Hoagy Carmichael, Johnny Mercer) – 7:54
4. "The Newest Blues" – 8:07
5. "When Love Is New" – 7:20
6. "I Mean You" (Thelonious Monk) – 5:35
7. "Afternoon in Paris" (John Lewis) – 6:57
8. "The Theme" (Miles Davis) – 3:46

== Personnel ==
- Cedar Walton – piano
- David Williams – bass
- Billy Higgins – drums
