= More than a Mood =

Studio album by Stanley Turrentine
- Released: 1992
- Recorded: February 13, 1992
- Studio: The Hit Factory, NYC; Sound on Sound, NYC
- Genre: Jazz
- Length: 55:26
- Label: MusicMasters
- Producer: Joe Delia

Stanley Turrentine chronology
La Place (1989)	More than a Mood (1992)	If I Could (1993)

More than a Mood is an album by American jazz saxophonist Stanley Turrentine, released in 1992 on MusicMasters Records. This album peaked at No. 8 on the US Billboard Top Jazz Albums chart.

== Reception ==
Professional ratings
Review scores
Source	Rating
AllMusic	4/5 stars

AllMusic reviewer Scott Yanow stated "Turrentine is in top form on a variety of standards ... A fine session".

The Sun-Sentinel's Matt Schudel wrote, "The album never lags—it is both hot and cool, smooth and spirited, all the way through".

== Track listing ==
1. "Thomasville" (Tommy Turrentine) – 5:26
2. "They Can't Take That Away from Me" (George Gershwin, Ira Gershwin) – 8:57
3. "In a Sentimental Mood" (Duke Ellington, Manny Kurtz, Irving Mills) – 7:28
4. "Easy Walker" (Billy Taylor) – 5:57
5. "Triste" (Antônio Carlos Jobim) – 5:45
6. "Pieces of Dreams" (Michel Legrand, Alan Bergman, Marilyn Bergman) – 5:19
7. "Spirits Up Above" (Rahsaan Roland Kirk) – 9:19
8. "More than a Mood" (Bill Simon, Frank Marino) – 6:58

== Personnel ==
- Stanley Turrentine – tenor saxophone
- Freddie Hubbard – trumpet, flugelhorn (tracks 1 & 7)
- Cedar Walton – piano
- Ron Carter – bass
- Billy Higgins – drums
