= Cedar Walton Plays =

Studio album by Cedar Walton featuring Ron Carter and Billy Higgins
- Released: 1987
- Recorded: September 29–30, 1986
- Studio: New York City
- Genre: Jazz
- Length: 62:08
- Label: Delos; D/CD 4008
- Producer: John Eargle

Cedar Walton chronology
Blues for Myself (1986)	Cedar Walton Plays (1987)	Duo (1990)

Cedar Walton Plays is an album by pianist Cedar Walton which was recorded in 1986 and released on the Delos label in 1993.

== Reception ==
Professional ratings
Review scores
Source	Rating
Allmusic	4.5/5 stars
The Penguin Guide to Jazz Recordings	3.5/4 stars

In his review on Allmusic, Scott Yanow states "Pianist Cedar Walton heads a medium-size group on this 1986 Delos CD, a rhythm section with bassist Ron Carter and drummer Billy Higgins plus a five piece horn section ... Unfortunately the horns mostly stick to ensemblework but Walton and his trio are in top form".

== Track listing ==
All compositions by Cedar Walton except where noted.

1. "Willow Weep for Me" (Ann Ronell) – 9:31
2. "Hallucinations" (Bud Powell) – 5:44
3. "Bremond's Blues" – 4:24
4. "So in Love" (Cole Porter) – 10:51
5. "Book's Bossa" (Walter Book, Cedar Walton) – 6:38
6. "Out of the Past" (Benny Golson) – 11:20
7. "He's a Real Gone Guy" (Nellie Lutcher) – 6:39
8. "Something in Common" – 7:01

== Personnel ==
- Cedar Walton – piano
- Don Sickler – trumpet
- Steve Turre – trombone
- Kenny Garrett – alto saxophone
- Lou Orensteen – tenor saxophone
- Charles Davis – baritone saxophone
- Ron Carter – bass
- Billy Higgins – drums
