= Down Home (Sam Jones album) =

Studio album by Sam Jones
- Released: 1962
- Recorded: June 25 & August 15–16, 1962; New York City
- Genre: Jazz
- Length: 39:26
- Label: Riverside; RLP 432
- Producer: Orrin Keepnews

Sam Jones chronology
The Chant (1961)	Down Home (1962)	Seven Minds (1974)

Down Home is the third album by the double bass player and cellist Sam Jones, recorded in 1962 and released on the Riverside label.

== Reception ==
Professional ratings
Review scores
Source	Rating
AllMusic	4.5/5 stars
DownBeat	4/5 stars
The Encyclopedia of Popular Music	4/5 stars
The Penguin Guide to Jazz Recordings	3/4 stars

Scott Yanow of AllMusic wrote: "This is excellent hard bop-based music." The Penguin Guide to Jazz Recordings wrote that Jones "improvises against the grain of the orchestra to telling effect." Billboard called the album "a fine showcase for Jones."

== Track listing ==
All compositions by Sam Jones except as indicated

1. "Unit 7" - 4:49
2. "Come Rain or Come Shine" (Harold Arlen, Johnny Mercer) - 4:05
3. "'Round Midnight" (Thelonious Monk) - 5:31
4. "O.P." - 5:07
5. "Thumbstring" (Ray Brown) - 4:31
6. "Down Home" - 4:08
7. "Strollin'" (Horace Silver) - 4:12
8. "Falling in Love With Love" (Lorenz Hart, Richard Rodgers) - 7:03

== Personnel ==
- Sam Jones - double bass (tracks 1 & 5), cello (tracks 2–4 & 6–8)
- Les Spann - flute (tracks 3, 4 & 8)
- Snooky Young (tracks 1 & 5), Blue Mitchell (tracks 1, 2, 5 & 7), Clark Terry (tracks 2 & 7) - trumpet
- Jimmy Cleveland - trombone (tracks 1, 2, 5 & 7)
- Frank Strozier - flute (track 6), alto saxophone (tracks 1, 2, 5 & 7)
- Jimmy Heath - tenor saxophone (tracks 1, 2, 5 & 7)
- Pat Patrick - baritone saxophone, flute (tracks 1, 2, 5 & 7)
- Ernie Wilkins - arranger (tracks 1, 2, 5 & 7)
- Wynton Kelly (tracks 2 & 7), Joe Zawinul (tracks 1, 3–6 & 8) - piano
- Ron Carter (tracks 2, 6 & 7), Israel Crosby (tracks 3, 4 & 8) - double bass
- Vernel Fournier (tracks 3, 4 & 8), Ben Riley (tracks 1, 2 & 5–7) - drums
