= Eastern Rebellion =

Studio album by Eastern Rebellion
- Released: 1976
- Recorded: December 10, 1975
- Studio: C.I. Recording Studio, New York City, NY
- Genre: Jazz
- Length: 41:18
- Label: Timeless; SJP 101
- Producer: Cedar Walton

Eastern Rebellion chronology
Eastern Rebellion (1976)	Eastern Rebellion 2 (1977)

Cedar Walton chronology
Mobius (1975)	Eastern Rebellion (1976)	The Pentagon (1976)

Eastern Rebellion is an album by Eastern Rebellion led by pianist Cedar Walton which was recorded in late 1975 and became the first release on the Dutch Timeless label.

== Reception ==
Professional ratings
Review scores
Source	Rating
AllMusic	4.5/5 stars
The Penguin Guide to Jazz	4/4 stars

AllMusic awarded the album 4½ stars noting "The veteran musicians all sound quite inspired on this advanced straightahead set" and calling it "A gem". The Penguin Guide to Jazz described it as "one of the pianist's finest albums".

== Track listing ==
All compositions by Cedar Walton except as indicated

1. "Bolivia" – 10:10
2. "Naima" (John Coltrane) – 8:37
3. "5/4 Thing" (George Coleman) – 7:53
4. "Bittersweet" (Sam Jones) – 6:54
5. "Mode for Joe" – 7:51

== Personnel ==
- Cedar Walton – piano
- George Coleman – tenor saxophone
- Sam Jones – bass
- Billy Higgins – drums
