= Sam Jones (musician) =

American jazz double bassist, cellist, and composer (1924–1981)

Background information
- Born: November 12, 1924; Jacksonville, Florida, U.S.
- Died: December 15, 1981 (aged 57)
- Genres: Jazz
- Occupation: Musician
- Instruments: Double bass, cello
- Years active: 1955–1981
- Formerly of: Cannonball Adderley, Oscar Peterson, Cedar Walton

Samuel Jones (November 12, 1924 – December 15, 1981) was an American jazz double bassist, cellist, and composer.

== Background ==
Sam Jones was born in Jacksonville, Florida, United States, to a musical family. His father played piano and drums and his aunt played organ in church. In 1955, he moved to New York City and began his recording career with Tiny Bradshaw, before working with Bill Evans, Bobby Timmons, Les Jazz Modes, Kenny Dorham, Illinois Jacquet, Freddie Hubbard, Dizzy Gillespie (1958–59), and Thelonious Monk. He is probably best known for his work with Cannonball Adderley, performing in his quintet from 1955 to 1956 and then again from 1959 to 1964, and recording extensively for Riverside Records as both a leader and sideman. He later spent several years working with Oscar Peterson (1966-1970) and Cedar Walton (1972-1977). In the 1970s, Jones recorded several albums as a bandleader for the Xanadu and SteepleChase labels. Jones wrote the jazz standards "Del Sasser" and "Unit 7" while working with Adderley. Other compositions include "Blue Funk", "O.P.", "Bittersweet", and "Seven Minds".

He died of lung cancer in 1981 at the age of 57.

== Discography ==
=== As leader ===
- 1960: The Soul Society (Riverside)
- 1961: The Chant (Riverside)
- 1962: Down Home (Riverside)
- 1974: Seven Minds (East Wind)
- 1976: Cello Again (Xanadu)
- 1976: Double Bass (SteepleChase) – with Niels-Henning Ørsted Pedersen
- 1977: Changes & Things (Xanadu)
- 1977: Something in Common (Muse)
- 1978: Visitation (SteepleChase)
- 1979: Groovin' High (Muse)
- 1979: The Bassist! (Interplay) – with Keith Copeland, Kenny Barron
- 1979: Something New (Interplay)
- 1988: Right Down Front: The Riverside Collection (Original Jazz Classics) – compilation of Riverside recordings

=== As sideman ===
With Cannonball Adderley

- Sophisticated Swing (1957; EmArcy)
- Cannonball Enroute (1957; EmArcy)
- Cannonball's Sharpshooters (1958; EmArcy)
- Somethin' Else (1958; Blue Note)
- Portrait of Cannonball by Cannonball Adderley (1959; Riverside)
- The Cannonball Adderley Quintet in San Francisco (1959; Riverside)
- Them Dirty Blues by Cannonball Adderley (1960; Riverside)
- The Cannonball Adderley Quintet at the Lighthouse (1960; Riverside)
- African Waltz (1961; Riverside)
- The Cannonball Adderley Quintet Plus (1961; Riverside)
- Nancy Wilson and Cannonball Adderley (1961; Riverside)
- The Cannonball Adderley Sextet in New York (1962; Riverside)
- Cannonball in Europe! (1962; Riverside)
- Jazz Workshop Revisited (1962; Riverside)
- Autumn Leaves (1963; Riverside [Japan])
- Nippon Soul (1963; Riverside)
- The Sextet (Milestone, 1962-63 [1982])
- Cannonball Adderley Live! (1964)
- Live Session! (1964)
- Cannonball Adderley's Fiddler on the Roof (1964)
- Domination (1965–70; Capitol)
- Phenix (1975, Fantasy)

With Nat Adderley

- To the Ivy League from Nat (1956; EmArcy)
- Much Brass (1961; Riverside)
- Work Song (1960; Riverside)
- That's Right! (1960; Riverside)
- Naturally! (1961; Jazzland)
- In the Bag (1962; Jazzland)
- Autobiography (1964; Atlantic)

With Joe Alexander

- Blue Jubilee (Jazzland, 1960)

With Gene Ammons

- Jug & Dodo (Prestige, 1962 [1972]) – with Dodo Marmarosa
- God Bless Jug and Sonny (Prestige, 1973 [2001]) – with Sonny Stitt
- Left Bank Encores (Prestige, 1973 [2001]) – with Sonny Stitt
- Together Again for the Last Time (Prestige, 1973 [1976]) – with Sonny Stitt
- Goodbye (Prestige, 1974)

With Chet Baker

- It Could Happen to You (Riverside, 1958)

With Walter Bishop Jr.

- Valley Land (Muse, 1974 [1976])
- Hot House (Muse, 1977/78 [1979])

With Tina Brooks

- True Blue (1960; Blue Note)

With Ray Brown

- Ray Brown with the All-Star Big Band (Verve, 1962)

With Ray Bryant

- All Blues (Pablo, 1978)

With Kenny Burrell

- Blue Lights Volume 1 (1958; Blue Note)
- Blue Lights Volume 2 (1958; Blue Note)
- Swingin' (Blue Note, 1956 [rel. 1980])

With Donald Byrd

- Off to the Races (1958; Blue Note)
- Byrd in Hand (1959; Blue Note)

With James Clay

- The Sound of the Wide Open Spaces!!!! (Riverside, 1960) – with David "Fathead" Newman
- A Double Dose of Soul (Riverside, 1960)

With Arnett Cobb

- More Party Time (Prestige, 1960)
- Movin' Right Along (Prestige, 1960)

With Al Cohn

- Al Cohn's America (Xanadu, 1976)
- True Blue (Xanadu, 1976) – with Dexter Gordon
- Silver Blue (Xanadu, 1976) – with Dexter Gordon

With George Coleman

- Amsterdam After Dark (Timeless, 1979)

With Ronnie Cuber

- Cuber Libre (Xanadu, 1976)

With King Curtis

- Soul Meeting (Prestige, 1960)

With Walter Davis Jr.

- Davis Cup (1959; Blue Note)

With Lou Donaldson

- The Time Is Right (1959; Blue Note)
- Sunny Side Up (1960; Blue Note)
- Blowing in the Wind (1966; Cadet)

With Kenny Dorham

- 'Round About Midnight at the Cafe Bohemia (1956; Blue Note)
- And The Jazz Prophets, Vol. 1 (1956; ABC-Paramount)
- This Is the Moment! (1958; Riverside)

With Kenny Drew

- Undercurrent (1960; Blue Note)

With Ted Dunbar

- Opening Remarks (Xanadu, 1978)

With Bill Evans

- Everybody Digs Bill Evans (1958; Riverside)

With Art Farmer

- Homecoming (Mainstream, 1971)
- Yesterday's Thoughts (East Wind, 1975)
- To Duke with Love (East Wind, 1975)
- The Summer Knows (East Wind, 1976)
- Art Farmer Quintet at Boomers (East Wind, 1976)

With Victor Feldman

- Merry Olde Soul (Riverside, 1961)

With Red Garland

- Red in Blues-ville (Prestige, 1959)
- The Red Garland Trio + Eddie "Lockjaw" Davis (Moodsville, 1959) – with Eddie "Lockjaw" Davis
- Halleloo-Y'-All (Prestige, 1960)
- Soul Burnin' (Prestige, 1959–61)
- Bright and Breezy (Jazzland, 1961)
- Solar (Jazzland, 1962)
- Red's Good Groove (Jazzland, 1962)
- Auf Wiedersehen (MPS, 1971 [1975])
- Feelin' Red (Muse, 1978)

With Terry Gibbs

- Take It from Me (Impulse!, 1964)
- Bopstacle Course (Xanadu, 1974)

With Dizzy Gillespie

- The Ebullient Mr. Gillespie (Verve, 1959)
- Have Trumpet, Will Excite! (Verve, 1959)

With Paul Gonsalves

- Gettin' Together (1960; Jazzland)

With Dexter Gordon

- The Jumpin' Blues (Prestige, 1970)
- Biting the Apple (SteepleChase, 1977)

With Rein de Graaff

- New York Jazz (Timeless Records,1979) – with Louis Hayes

With Grant Green

- Gooden's Corner (Blue Note, 1961 [1980])
- Nigeria (Blue Note, 1962 [1980]
- Oleo (Blue Note, 1962 [1980])
- Born to Be Blue (Blue Note, 1962 [1985])

With Johnny Griffin

- The Little Giant (Riverside, 1959)
- Bush Dance (Galaxy, 1978)

With Barry Harris

- Barry Harris at the Jazz Workshop (Riverside, 1960)
- Live in Tokyo (Xanadu, 1976)

With Louis Hayes

- Louis Hayes (Vee-Jay, 1960)

With Jimmy Heath

- The Time and the Place (Landmark, 1974 [1994])
- Picture of Heath (Xanadu, 1975)

With Johnny Hodges

- Back to Back: Duke Ellington and Johnny Hodges Play the Blues (Verve, 1959)
- Blue Hodge (Verve, 1961)

With John Lee Hooker

- That's My Story (Riverside, 1960)

With Freddie Hubbard

- Open Sesame (Blue Note, 1960)

With Fred Jackson

- Hootin' 'n Tootin' (Blue Note, 1962)

With Milt Jackson

- Bags Meets Wes! (Riverside, 1961)

With Willis Jackson

- More Gravy (Prestige, 1963)

With Eddie Jefferson

- Things Are Getting Better (Muse, 1974)

With J. J. Johnson

- A Touch of Satin (Columbia, 1962)

With Etta Jones

- If You Could See Me Now (Muse, 1978)

With Hank Jones

- Groovin' High (Muse, 1978)

With Jo Jones

- The Main Man (Pablo, 1977)

With Philly Joe Jones

- Drums Around the World (Riverside, 1959)

With Clifford Jordan

- Glass Bead Games (Strata-East, 1974)
- Half Note (SteepleChase, 1974 [1985])
- Night of the Mark VII (Muse, 1975)
- On Stage Vol. 1 (SteepleChase, 1975 [1977])
- On Stage Vol. 2 (SteepleChase, 1975 [1978])
- On Stage Vol. 3 (SteepleChase, 1975 [1979])
- Firm Roots (Steeplechase, 1975)
- The Highest Mountain (Steeplechase, 1975)

With Duke Jordan

- Misty Thursday (SteepleChase, 1975 [1976])
- Duke's Delight (SteepleChase, 1975 [1976])
- Lover Man (SteepleChase, 1975 [1979])

With Wynton Kelly

- Wynton Kelly! (Vee Jay, 1961)

With Harold Land

- West Coast Blues! (Jazzland, 1960)

With Yusef Lateef

- The Gentle Giant (Atlantic, 1971)
- Part of the Search (Atlantic, 1973)

With Abbey Lincoln

- It's Magic (Riverside, 1958)
- Abbey Is Blue (Riverside, 1959)

With Mike Longo

- Matrix (Mainstream, 1972)

With Johnny Lytle

- Nice and Easy (Jazzland, 1962)

With Chuck Mangione

- Recuerdo (Jazzland, 1962)

With Warne Marsh

- How Deep, How High (Interplay, 1976 [1980])

With Jack McDuff

- The Heatin' System (Cadet, 1971)

With Ken McIntyre

- Looking Ahead (New Jazz, 1960) – with Eric Dolphy

With Charles McPherson

- Siku Ya Bibi (Day of the Lady) (Mainstream, 1972)
- Beautiful! (Xanadu, 1975)
- Live in Tokyo (Xanadu, 1976)

With Billy Mitchell

- The Colossus of Detroit (Xanadu, 1978)

With Blue Mitchell

- Out of the Blue (1959; Riverside)
- Blue Soul (1959; Riverside)
- Blue's Moods (1960; Riverside)
- A Sure Thing (1962; Riverside)

With Thelonious Monk

- At Town Hall (1959; Riverside)
- 5 by Monk by 5 (1959; Riverside)
- Les Liaisons Dangereuses 1960 (1959 [2017]; Sam Records)

With Wes Montgomery

- Movin' Along (1960)

With Tete Montoliu

- Secret Love (Timeless, 1977)

With Phineas Newborn Jr.

- A World of Piano! (Contemporary, 1962)
- The Great Jazz Piano of Phineas Newborn Jr. (Contemporary, 1963)

With Sal Nistico

- Heavyweights (Jazzland, 1961)
- Neo/Nistico (Bee Hive, 1978)

With Horace Parlan

- Movin' & Groovin' (1960; Blue Note)

With Cecil Payne and Duke Jordan

- Brooklyn Brothers (Muse, 1973)

With Oscar Peterson

- Blues Etude (1966; Limelight)
- Soul Espanol (1966; Limelight)
- The Way I Really Play (1968; MPS)
- Mellow Mood (1968; MPS)
- Travelin' On (1968; MPS)
- Hello Herbie (1969; MPS)
- Tristeza on Piano (1970; MPS)

With Bud Powell

- Time Waits (1958; Blue Note)

With Julian Priester

- Keep Swingin' (Riverside, 1960)
- Spiritsville (Jazzland, 1960)

With Ike Quebec

- The Complete Blue Note 45 Sessions (Blue Note, 1959–62)
- Blue & Sentimental (Blue Note, 1961)

With Jimmy Raney

- The Influence (Xanadu, 1975)
- Live in Tokyo (Xanadu, 1976)

With Sonny Red

- Out of the Blue (1960; Blue Note)

With Dizzy Reece

- Comin' On! (Blue Note, 1960)
- Blowin' Away (Interplay, 1978)

With Red Rodney

- Bird Lives! (Muse, 1973)
- The Red Tornado (Muse, 1975)

With Sal Salvador

- Starfingers (Bee Hive, 1978)

With Archie Shepp

- On Green Dolphin Street (Denon, 1978)

With Louis Smith

- Prancin' (SteepleChase, 1979)

With Les Spann

- Gemini (Jazzland, 1961)

With James Spaulding

- James Spaulding Plays the Legacy of Duke Ellington (Storyville, 1977)

With Sonny Stitt

- Tune-Up! (Cobblestone, 1972)
- Constellation (Cobblestone, 1972)
- 12! (Muse, 1972)
- My Buddy: Sonny Stitt Plays for Gene Ammons (Muse, 1975)
- Blues for Duke (Muse, 1975 [1978])

With Idrees Sulieman

- Now Is the Time (SteepleChase, 1976)

With Art Taylor

- Taylor's Tenors (1959; Prestige)

With Clark Terry

- In Orbit (1958; Riverside)
- Top and Bottom Brass (Riverside, 1959)

With Lucky Thompson

- Concert: Friday the 13th - Cook County Jail (Groove Merchant, 1973)
- I Offer You (Groove Merchant, 1973)

With Teri Thornton

- Devil May Care (Riverside, 1961)

With Bobby Timmons

- This Here is Bobby Timmons (1960; Riverside)
- Soul Time (1960; Riverside)
- Easy Does It (1961; Riverside)
- Sweet and Soulful Sounds (1962; Riverside)
- Born to Be Blue! (1963; Riverside)
- From the Bottom (1964; Riverside)
- Workin' Out! (1964; Riverside)
- Little Barefoot Soul (1964; Prestige)

With Stanley Turrentine

- Never Let Me Go (Blue Note, 1963)

With Harold Vick

- Don't Look Back (Strata-East, 1974)

With Eddie "Cleanhead" Vinson

- Back Door Blues (Riverside, 1962)

With Cedar Walton

- Breakthrough! (Muse, 1972)
- A Night At Boomers, Vol. 1 (Muse, 1973)
- A Night At Boomers, Vol. 2 (Muse, 1973)
- Firm Roots (Muse, 1974 [1976])
- Pit Inn (East Wind, 1974)
- Eastern Rebellion (Timeless, 1976) – with George Coleman & Billy Higgins
- The Pentagon (East Wind, 1976)
- Eastern Rebellion 2 (Timeless, 1977) – with Bob Berg & Billy Higgins
- First Set (SteepleChase, 1977)
- Second Set (SteepleChase, 1977)
- Third Set (SteepleChase, 1977)
- Eastern Rebellion 3 (Timeless, 1980) – with Curtis Fuller, Bob Berg & Billy Higgins

With Roosevelt Wardell

- The Revelation (Prestige, 1960)

With Ben Webster

- Soulmates (Riverside, 1963) – with Joe Zawinul

With Don Wilkerson

- The Texas Twister (Riverside, 1960)

With Claude Williamson

- New Departure (Interplay, 1978)

With Joe Zawinul

- Money in the Pocket (Atlantic, 1967)
