= The Mode =

Studio album by Sonny Red
- Released: 1962
- Recorded: May 29 and December 14, 1961; Plaza Sound Studios, New York City
- Genre: Jazz
- Label: Jazzland; JLP 59

Sonny Red chronology
A Story Tale (1961)	The Mode (1962)	Images (1961)

The Mode is an album by American saxophonist Sonny Red recorded in 1961 with Grant Green and Barry Harris and released on the Jazzland label.

== Reception ==
Professional ratings
Review scores
Source	Rating
Down Beat	2.5/5 stars
Allmusic	3/5 stars

Allmusic awarded the album 3 stars, stating: "This vinyl LP isn't a masterpiece, but it's decent and certainly likable."

== Track listing ==
All compositions by Sonny Red except as indicated

1. "Moon River" (Henry Mancini, Johnny Mercer) - 6:08
2. "I Like the Likes of You" (Vernon Duke, E.Y. "Yip" Harburg) - 4:19
3. "Super 20" - 5:32
4. "Bye Bye Blues" (Dave Bennett, Chauncey Gray, Fred Hamm, Bert Lown) - 4:30
5. "The Mode" - 9:48
6. "Never, Never Land" (Betty Comden, Adolph Green, Jule Styne) - 6:31
7. "Ko-Kee" - 4:12
- Recorded at Plaza Sound Studios in New York City on May 29 (tracks 2, 4, 6 & 7) and December 14 (tracks 1, 3 & 5), 1961

== Personnel ==
- Sonny Red - alto saxophone
- Grant Green - guitar (tracks 1, 3 & 5)
- Barry Harris (tracks 1, 3 & 5), Cedar Walton (tracks 2, 4, 6 & 7) - piano
- George Tucker - bass
- Jimmy Cobb - drums
