= That's My Story =

Studio album by John Lee Hooker
- Released: April or May 1960
- Recorded: February 9, 1960
- Studio: Reeves Sound Studios in New York
- Genre: Blues
- Length: 44:43
- Label: Riverside
- Producer: Orrin Keepnews

John Lee Hooker chronology
The Country Blues of John Lee Hooker (1959)	That's My Story (1960)	Travelin' (1960)

That's My Story is a studio album by American blues musician John Lee Hooker, released in April or May 1960 on Riverside Records. The album was recorded in one session on February 9, 1960 at Reeves Sound Studio in New York City. It was produced by Orrin Keepnews and features the rhythm section from saxophonist Cannonball Adderley's group, which included bassist Sam Jones and drummer Louis Hayes.

== Release and reception ==
Professional ratings
Review scores
Source	Rating
AllMusic	4.5/5 stars
Down Beat	4/5 stars
The Rolling Stone Album Guide	4/5 stars
The Penguin Guide to Blues Recordings	3/4 stars

That's My Story was released in 1960 to positive reviews from The Jazz Review and New York Times critic Robert Shelton. By the time of this recording, Hooker's Delta blues style of playing had influenced and become part of the "folk boom" in the United States. Mojo later cited the record as the point when Hooker had "developed the more ruminative side of his work".

== Track listing ==
All songs written by John Lee Hooker except the first track which is an adaptation of "Money (That's What I Want)" by Berry Gordy and Janie Bradford, with additional lyrics by John Lee Hooker.

1. "I Need Some Money" – 2:25
2. "Come on and See About Me" – 3:06
3. "I'm Wanderin'" – 5:12
4. "Democrat Man" – 3:27
5. "I Want to Talk About You" – 3:02
6. "Gonna Use My Rod" – 4:20
7. "Wednesday Evenin' Blues" – 3:34
8. "No More Doggin' " – 2:42
9. "One of These Days" – 4:05
10. "I Believe I'll Go Back Home" – 3:42
11. "You're Leavin' Me, Baby" – 3:51
12. "That's My Story" – 4:34

== Personnel ==
Credits for That's My Story adapted from liner notes.

- Paul Bacon – design, cover production
- Ken Braren – design, cover production
- Louis Hayes – drums
- Jack Higgins – engineer
- John Lee Hooker – guitar, vocals
- Sam Jones – bass
- Orrin Keepnews – producer, liner notes
- Harris Lewine – design, cover production
- Lawrence Shustak – photography
