= Eastern Rebellion 2 =

Studio album by Eastern Rebellion
- Released: 1977
- Recorded: January 1977
- Studio: C.I. Recording Studio, New York City, NY
- Genre: Jazz
- Length: 48:57
- Label: Timeless; SJP 106
- Producer: Cedar Walton

Eastern Rebellion chronology
Eastern Rebellion (1976)	Eastern Rebellion 2 (1977)	Eastern Rebellion 3 (1980)

Cedar Walton chronology
Beyond Mobius (1976)	Eastern Rebellion 2 (1977)	First Set (1977)

Eastern Rebellion 2 is an album by Eastern Rebellion led pianist Cedar Walton which was recorded in early 1977 and released on the Dutch Timeless label.

== Reception ==
Professional ratings
Review scores
Source	Rating
AllMusic	4/5 stars
The Penguin Guide to Jazz	3.5/4 stars

AllMusic awarded the album 4 stars noting "The music is unassuming, without theatrics or extended technique, and as a result may get lost in the shuffle. This is, however, a polished and pleasing set by first-rate talent, and it achieves its goal of exciting, mainstream fare with a 1970s flair".

== Track listing ==
All compositions by Cedar Walton

1. "Fantasy in D" – 6:52
2. "The Maestro" – 4:41
3. "Ojos de Rojo" – 6:56
4. "Sunday Suite" – 17:54
5. "Clockwise" – 5:00 Bonus track on CD
6. "Firm Roots" – 7:34 Bonus track on CD

== Personnel ==
- Cedar Walton – piano
- Bob Berg – tenor saxophone
- Sam Jones – bass
- Billy Higgins – drums
- Curtis Fuller – trombone (tracks 5 & 6)
