= Third Set (Cedar Walton album) =

Live album by Cedar Walton
- Released: 1983
- Recorded: October 1, 1977
- Venue: Jazzhus Montmartre, Copenhagen, Denmark
- Genre: Jazz
- Length: 50:07
- Label: SteepleChase; SCS-1179
- Producer: Nils Winther

Cedar Walton chronology
Second Set (1979)	Third Set (1983)	Animation (1978)

Third Set is a live album by pianist Cedar Walton recorded in Denmark in 1977 and released on the Danish SteepleChase label.

== Reception ==
Professional ratings
Review scores
Source	Rating
Allmusic	3/5 stars
The Penguin Guide to Jazz	3/4 stars

Allmusic awarded the album 3 stars. The Penguin Guide to Jazz commented that the album "sounds a little ragged".

== Track listing ==
All compositions by Cedar Walton except where noted.

1. "Angel in the Night" (Billy Higgins) – 12:38
2. "Bolivia" – 12:39
3. "Fantasy in D" – 9:56
4. "Blue Monk" (Thelonious Monk) – 6:12
5. "Rhythm-a-Ning" (Monk) – 9:46

== Personnel ==
- Cedar Walton – piano
- Bob Berg – tenor saxophone
- Sam Jones – bass
- Billy Higgins – drums
