= Charisma (album) =

Studio album by Lee Morgan
- Released: Mid May 1969
- Recorded: September 29, 1966
- Studio: Van Gelder Studio, Englewood Cliffs, NJ
- Genre: Jazz
- Length: 39:04
- Label: Blue Note; BST 84312
- Producer: Francis Wolff

Lee Morgan chronology
Delightfulee (1966)	Charisma (1969)	The Rajah (1984)

Alternative cover
- The full gatefold artwork for the album

Charisma is an album by jazz trumpeter Lee Morgan featuring performances by Morgan, Jackie McLean, Hank Mobley, Cedar Walton, Paul Chambers and Billy Higgins. Recorded on September 29, 1966, but not released until 1969, on the Blue Note label.

== Reception ==
The AllMusic review by Scott Yanow awarded the album 4 stars stating: "The three horns, all of whom sound quite individual, each have their exciting moments, and the results are quintessential mid-'60s hard bop."

Professional ratings
Review scores
Source	Rating
Allmusic	4/5 stars
The Penguin Guide to Jazz	3/4 stars

== Track listing ==
All compositions by Lee Morgan, except where indicated.

1. "Hey Chico" - 7:17
2. "Somethin' Cute" - 5:39
3. "Rainy Night" (Walton) - 5:39
4. "Sweet Honey Bee" (Pearson) - 6:54
5. "The Murphy Man" - 7:34
6. "The Double Up" - 6:01

== Personnel ==
- Lee Morgan - trumpet
- Jackie McLean - alto saxophone
- Hank Mobley - tenor saxophone
- Cedar Walton - piano
- Paul Chambers - bass
- Billy Higgins - drums
