= Second Set =

Live album by Cedar Walton Quartet
- Released: 1979
- Recorded: October 1, 1977
- Venue: Jazzhus Montmartre, Copenhagen, Denmark
- Genre: Jazz
- Length: 42:34
- Label: SteepleChase; SCS-1113
- Producer: Nils Winther

Cedar Walton chronology
First Set (1978)	Second Set (1979)	Third Set (1983)

Second Set is a live album by pianist Cedar Walton recorded in Denmark in 1977 and released on the Danish SteepleChase label.

== Reception ==
Professional ratings
Review scores
Source	Rating
Allmusic	3/5 stars
The Penguin Guide to Jazz	3.5/4 stars

Allmusic awarded the album 3 stars stating "Eclectic but solidly grounded post-bop pianist Cedar Walton leads his strong quartet through a varied second set of the evening showcasing his fine players as they settle in and groove". The Penguin Guide to Jazz praised and highlighted Berg's performance on "Blue Train".

== Track listing ==
All compositions by Cedar Walton except where noted.

1. "Blue Train" (John Coltrane) - 9:00
2. "I Didn't Know What Time It Was" (Lorenz Hart, Richard Rodgers) - 13:02
3. "The Sunday Suite" - 19:30
4. "The Theme" (Miles Davis) - 1:05

== Personnel ==
- Cedar Walton - piano
- Bob Berg - tenor saxophone
- Sam Jones - bass
- Billy Higgins - drums
