= Mr. Billy Higgins =

Studio album by Billy Higgins
- Released: 1985
- Recorded: April 12 & May 29, 1984; Sound Logic, Glendale, CA
- Genre: Jazz
- Length: 43:39
- Label: Riza; RRL-85-104
- Producer: Billy Higgins & James Saad

Billy Higgins chronology
Once More (1980)	Mr. Billy Higgins (1985)	Bridgework (1986)

Professional ratings
Review scores
Source	Rating
Allmusic	4/5 stars

Mr. Billy Higgins is an album led by American jazz drummer Billy Higgins recorded in 1984 and first released on the Riza label.

== Reception ==
The Allmusic review by Scott Yanow awarded the album 4 stars calling it "fresh, generally modal post-bop. Well worth picking up".

== Track listing ==
1. "Dance of the Clones" (William Henderson) - 9:03
2. "John Coltrane" (Bill Lee) - 12:15
3. "Morning Awakening" (Gary Bias) - 12:00
4. "Humility" (Bias) - 4:58
5. "East Side Stomp" (Bias) - 5:23

== Personnel ==
- Billy Higgins - drums
- Gary Bias - soprano saxophone, alto saxophone, tenor saxophone
- William Henderson - piano
- Tony Dumas - bass
