= Tangerine (Dexter Gordon album) =

Studio album by Dexter Gordon
- Released: 1975
- Recorded: June 22 & 28, 1972
- Studio: Van Gelder Studio, Englewood Cliffs, New Jersey
- Genre: Jazz
- Length: 42:36
- Label: Prestige; PR 10091
- Producer: Ozzie Cadena

Dexter Gordon chronology
Ca'Purange (1971)	Tangerine (1975)	Generation (1972)

Tangerine is an album by saxophonist Dexter Gordon which was recorded in 1972 and released on the Prestige label.

== Reception ==
Professional ratings
Review scores
Source	Rating
Allmusic	4/5 stars
The Rolling Stone Jazz Record Guide	4/5 stars
The Penguin Guide to Jazz Recordings	3/4 stars

Lindsay Planer of Allmusic states, "It certainly ranks up there as one of Gordon's greats". Derek Taylor reviewed the CD reissue for All About Jazz in 2000 stating "While this disc isn’t a classic on par with say much of his Blue Note work it still offers up immediate proof of why he resides in the upper echelon of the tenor saxophone hierarchy".

== Track listing ==
All compositions by Dexter Gordon except where noted

1. "Tangerine" (Johnny Mercer, Victor Schertzinger) - 8:54
2. "August Blues" - 9:47
3. "What It Was" - 8:07
4. "Days of Wine and Roses" (Henry Mancini, Mercer) - 8:43
- Recorded at Van Gelder Studio in Englewood Cliffs, New Jersey on June 22 (tracks 1–3) and June 28 (track 4), 1972

== Personnel ==
- Dexter Gordon - tenor saxophone
- Thad Jones - trumpet, flugelhorn (tracks 1–3)
- Hank Jones (tracks 1–3), Cedar Walton (track 4) - piano
- Stanley Clarke (tracks 1–3), Buster Williams (track 4) - bass
- Louis Hayes (tracks 1–3), Billy Higgins (track 4) - drums
