= Cedar Walton (album) =

Studio album by Cedar Walton
- Released: 1986
- Recorded: April 19, 1985
- Studio: Studio 44, Monster, Netherlands
- Genre: Jazz
- Label: Timeless; SJP 223
- Producer: Wim Wigt

Cedar Walton chronology
| The Trio 3 (1985) | Cedar Walton (1986) | Bluesville Time (1985) |

Cedar Walton is an eponymous album by pianist Cedar Walton which was recorded in 1985 and released on the Dutch Timeless label.

== Reception ==
Professional ratings
Review scores
| Source | Rating |
|---|---|
| Allmusic | 4.5/5 stars |
| The Penguin Guide to Jazz | 4/4 stars |

Allmusic awarded the album 4½ stars. The Penguin Guide to Jazz wrote: "the material doesn't give anyone enough to bite down on and there's too much filling for too little substance".

== Track listing ==
All compositions by Cedar Walton except as indicated

1. "Third Street Blues" – 7:13
2. "Magical Lady" (David Williams) – 7:30
3. "Short Comings" (Billy Higgins) – 5:42
4. "Voices Deep Within" – 8:50
5. "I'll Let You Know" – 7:24
6. "Bleeker Street Theme" – 5:06

== Personnel ==
- Cedar Walton – piano
- David Williams – bass
- Billy Higgins – drums
