= The Soldier (album) =

Studio album by Billy Higgins
- Released: 1981
- Recorded: December 3, 1979; Boogie Woogie Studios, New York City
- Genre: Jazz
- Length: 39:42
- Label: Timeless; SJP 145
- Producer: Cedar Walton

Billy Higgins chronology
| Soweto (1979) | The Soldier (1981) | Once More (1980) |

Professional ratings
Review scores
| Source | Rating |
|---|---|
| AllMusic | 3/5 stars |

The Soldier is the second album led by American jazz drummer Billy Higgins recorded in 1979 and released on the Dutch Timeless label. Digitally remastered in 2015 the album was reissued on the Japanese label Solid Records in their Timeless Jazz Master Collection.

== Reception ==
The AllMusic review by Michael G. Nastos states "This recording with Cedar Walton (p) presents post-bop standards, well-played".

== Track listing ==
1. "Sugar and Spice" (Monty Waters) – 4:50
2. "Midnite Waltz" (Cedar Walton) – 9:47
3. "Just in Time" (Jule Styne, Betty Comden, Adolph Green) – 5:45
4. "If You Could See Me Now" (Tadd Dameron, Carl Sigman) – 7:20
5. "Peace" (Horace Silver) – 5:17
6. "Sonny Moon for Two" (Sonny Rollins) – 6:43

== Personnel ==
- Billy Higgins – drums
- Monty Waters – alto saxophone
- Cedar Walton – piano
- Walter Booker – bass
- Roberta Davis – vocals (on "Sugar and Spice")
