= Blues for Duke =

Studio album by Sonny Stitt
- Released: 1978
- Recorded: December 3–4, 1975
- Studio: Blue Rock Studio, New York City
- Genre: Jazz
- Length: 37:07
- Label: Muse; MR 5129
- Producer: Elliot Meadow

Sonny Stitt chronology
Dumpy Mama (1975)	Blues for Duke (1978)	Forecast: Sonny & Red (1976)

Blues for Duke is an album by saxophonist Sonny Stitt featuring selections associated with Duke Ellington, recorded in 1975 and released on the Muse label in 1978.

== Reception ==
Professional ratings
Review scores
Source	Rating
AllMusic	3/5 stars

The Bay State Banner wrote that Stitt "sticks mainly to tenor sax, and brings some new approaches and tricks to the always excellent Ellington material he tackles."

Scott Yanow, in his review for AllMusic, stated: "The rhythm section (pianist Barry Harris, bassist Sam Jones and drummer Billy Higgins) is excellent, and although the results are somewhat predictable (with 'C Jam Blues' and 'Perdido' being the high points), the music on this LP can be enjoyed by bop fans."

== Track listing ==
1. "C Jam Blues" (Duke Ellington) - 6:07
2. "I Got It Bad (and That Ain't Good)" (Ellington, Paul Francis Webster) - 7:58
3. "Perdido" (Juan Tizol, Ervin Drake, Hans Lengsfelder) - 4:45
4. "Blues for Duke" (Sonny Stitt) - 6:59
5. "Don't Get Around Much Anymore" (Ellington, Bob Russell) - 3:45
6. "Satin Doll" (Ellington, Billy Strayhorn, Johnny Mercer) - 7:43

== Personnel ==
- Sonny Stitt - alto saxophone, tenor saxophone
- Barry Harris - piano
- Sam Jones - bass
- Billy Higgins - drums
