= Soul Cycle =

Studio album by Cedar Walton
- Released: 1970
- Recorded: July 25, 1969; New York City
- Genre: Jazz
- Length: 37:24
- Label: Prestige; PR 7693
- Producer: Don Schlitten

Cedar Walton chronology
The Electric Boogaloo Song (1969)	Soul Cycle (1970)	Breakthrough! (1972)

Soul Cycle is an album by pianist Cedar Walton, which was recorded in 1969 and released on the Prestige label.

== Reception ==
Professional ratings
Review scores
Source	Rating
Allmusic	2/5 stars
The Rolling Stone Jazz Record Guide	4/5 stars
The Penguin Guide to Jazz Recordings	3.5/4 stars

AllMusic reviewer Scott Yanow stated: "Walton was trying to widen his audience a bit at the time — not a bad goal, except that he felt he had to water down his music on a few of these numbers. A mixed bag".

== Track listing ==
All compositions by Cedar Walton, except as indicated

1. "Sundown Express" - 6:49
2. "Quiet Dawn" - 7:31
3. "Pensativa" (Clare Fischer) - 6:28
4. "My Cherie Amour" (Henry Cosby, Sylvia Moy, Stevie Wonder) - 4:13
5. "Easy Walker" (Billy Taylor) - 8:03
6. "I Should Care" (Sammy Cahn, Axel Stordahl, Paul Weston) - 3:26

== Personnel ==
- Cedar Walton - piano, electric piano
- James Moody - tenor saxophone, flute
- Rudy Stevenson - guitar
- Reggie Workman - bass
- Albert Heath - drums

=== Production ===
- Don Schlitten - producer
- Danfort Griffith - engineer
