= Pictures (Niels-Henning Ørsted Pedersen and Kenneth Knudsen album) =

Studio album by Niels-Henning Ørsted Pedersen and Kenneth Knudsen
- Released: 1977
- Recorded: December 4–5, 1976
- Studio: Sweet Silence Studios, Copenhagen, Denmark
- Genre: Jazz
- Length: 38:44
- Label: SteepleChase SCS 1068
- Producer: Nils Winther

Niels-Henning Ørsted Pedersen chronology
Double Bass (1976)	Pictures (1977)	Dancing on the Tables (1979)

Pictures is an album by Danish bassist Niels-Henning Ørsted Pedersen and keyboardist Kenneth Knudsen which was recorded in 1976 and released on the Danish SteepleChase label.

Professional ratings
Review scores
Source	Rating
AllMusic	3/5 stars
The Penguin Guide to Jazz Recordings	3/4 stars

== Track listing ==
All compositions by Kenneth Knudsen except where noted.

1. "Skagen" - 2:36
2. "School Song" (Niels-Henning Ørsted Pedersen) – 6:50
3. "It's All There" - 11:10
4. "Signal K" - 6:50
5. "Afternoon's Sentiment" (Ørsted Pedersen) – 7:00
6. "Daughters" - 4:07

== Personnel ==
- Niels-Henning Ørsted Pedersen – bass
- Kenneth Knudsen – keyboards
