= On Stage Vol. 3 =

Live album by Clifford Jordan & The Magic Triangle
- Released: 1979
- Recorded: March 29, 1975; The Bimhaus, Amsterdam, Holland
- Genre: Jazz
- Length: 39:53
- Label: SteepleChase; SCS-1104
- Producer: Nils Winther

Clifford Jordan chronology
On Stage Vol. 2 (1975)	On Stage Vol. 3 (1979)	Firm Roots (1975)

On Stage Vol. 3 is a live album by saxophonist Clifford Jordan which was recorded in Holland in 1975 and first released on the SteepleChase label in 1979.

== Reception ==
Professional ratings
Review scores
Source	Rating
Allmusic	3/5 stars
The Penguin Guide to Jazz Recordings	3/4 stars

In his review on Allmusic, Scott Yanow notes that "This final installment of a 1975 concert in Amsterdam finds tenor saxophonist Clifford Jordan in fine form... Like the previous two volumes, this one is also recommended"

== Track listing ==
All compositions by Cedar Walton except as indicated

1. "Seven Minds" (Sam Jones) - 13:19
2. "Shoulders" - 6:42
3. "St. Thomas" (Sonny Rollins) - 14:32
4. "Bleecker Street Theme" - 5:20

== Personnel ==
- Clifford Jordan - tenor saxophone
- Cedar Walton - piano
- Sam Jones - bass
- Billy Higgins - drums
