= Roots (Slide Hampton album) =

Studio album by Slide Hampton Quintet featuring Clifford Jordan
- Released: 1985
- Recorded: April 17, 1985; Studio 44, Monster, Netherlands
- Genre: Jazz
- Length: 70:14
- Label: Criss Cross Jazz; Criss 1015
- Producer: Gerry Teekens

Slide Hampton chronology
Cees Slinger-Slide Hampton Quintet in Concert (1984)	Roots (1985)	Dedicated to Diz (1993)

Roots is an album by American trombonist, composer and arranger Slide Hampton recorded in 1985 and released on the Dutch Criss Cross Jazz label.

== Reception ==
Professional ratings
Review scores
Source	Rating
AllMusic	4.5/5 stars
The Penguin Guide to Jazz Recordings	4/4 stars

AllMusic reviewer Ron Wynn stated: "A tremendous 1985 quintet session with trombonist Slide Hampton heading a distinguished group and nicely teaming with tenor saxophonist Clifford Jordan in a first-rate hard bop front line."

== Track listing ==
1. "Precipice" (Clifford Jordan) – 10:25
2. "Solar" (Miles Davis) – 11:30
3. "Roots" (Slide Hampton) – 8:25
4. "Maple Street" (Cedar Walton) – 9:24
5. "My Old Flame" (Arthur Johnston, Sam Coslow) – 10:40 Bonus track on CD
6. "Just in Time" (Jule Styne, Betty Comden, Adolph Green) – 4:11 Bonus track on CD
7. "Precipice" [alternate take] (Jordan) – 10:22 Bonus track on CD
8. "Barbados" (Charlie Parker) – 5:17 Bonus track on CD

== Personnel ==
- Slide Hampton – trombone, arranger
- Clifford Jordan – tenor saxophone
- Cedar Walton – piano
- David Williams – bass
- Billy Higgins – drums
