= The Pentagon (album) =

Studio album by Cedar Walton
- Released: 1976
- Recorded: May 17, 1976
- Studio: Mediasound, New York City
- Genre: Jazz
- Label: East Wind; EW 10002
- Producer: Nippon Phonogram Co., Ltd.

Cedar Walton chronology
Eastern Rebellion (1975)	The Pentagon (1976)	Beyond Mobius (1976)

The Pentagon is an album by pianist Cedar Walton recorded in 1976 and released on the Japanese East Wind label.

== Reception ==
Professional ratings
Review scores
Source	Rating
Allmusic	4/5 stars

Allmusic awarded the album 4 stars calling it "Superior to Walton's RCA recordings of the period and his upcoming output for Columbia, this obscure effort finds all of the musicians playing up to their usual level of creativity".

== Track listing ==
1. "Manteca" (Dizzy Gillespie, Chano Pozo, Gil Fuller) - 5:53
2. "Darn That Dream" (Jimmy Van Heusen, Eddie DeLange) - 5:14
3. "Una Mas" (Kenny Dorham) - 5:12
4. "D. B. Blues" (Lester Young) - 4:35
5. "I Can't Get Started" (Ira Gershwin, Vernon Duke) - 5:34
6. "He is a Hero" (Clifford Jordan) - 4:56

== Personnel ==
- Cedar Walton - piano
- Clifford Jordan - tenor saxophone
- Sam Jones - bass
- Billy Higgins - drums
- Ray Mantilla - congas
