= Sonny Red (album) =

Studio album by Sonny Red
- Released: 1971
- Recorded: 1971
- Genre: Jazz
- Label: Mainstream; MRL 324
- Producer: Bob Shad

Sonny Red chronology
Images (1961)	Sonny Red (1971)

Sonny Red is an album by American saxophonist Sonny Red recorded in 1971 and released on the Mainstream label.

== Reception ==
The Allmusic review awarded the album 4 stars stating simply "Early-'70s recording with Cedar Walton".

Professional ratings
Review scores
Source	Rating
Allmusic	4/5 stars

== Track listing ==
All compositions by Sonny Red except as indicated

1. "Love Song" - 5:48
2. "Tears" - 7:19
3. "Mustang" - 5:49
4. "And Then Again" (Elvin Jones) - 4:14
5. "My Romance" (Lorenz Hart, Richard Rodgers) - 4:44
6. "A Time for Love" (Johnny Mandel, Paul Francis Webster) - 5:19
7. "Rodan" - 4:36

== Personnel ==
- Sonny Red - flute, alto saxophone, tenor saxophone
- Cedar Walton - piano
- Herbie Lewis - bass
- Billy Higgins - drums, congas
