= Amsterdam After Dark =

Studio album by George Coleman
- Released: 1979
- Recorded: December 29, 1978 at Sound Ideas Studio, New York City
- Genre: Jazz
- Length: 44:49
- Label: Timeless; SJP 129
- Producer: Wim Wigt

George Coleman chronology
Meditation (1977)	Amsterdam After Dark (1979)	Playing Changes (1979)

Amsterdam After Dark is an album by the American jazz saxophonist George Coleman recorded in late 1978 and released on the Dutch label, Timeless.

== Reception ==
Professional ratings
Review scores
Source	Rating
AllMusic	4/5 stars
The Rolling Stone Jazz Record Guide	4/5 stars

Michael G. Nastos of AllMusic simply states, "Legendary tenor saxophonist blows up a storm with the Hilton Ruiz Trio".

== Track listing ==
All compositions by George Coleman except as indicated

1. "Amsterdam After Dark" – 8:29
2. "New Arrival" (Hilton Ruiz) – 7:21
3. "Lo-Joe" – 5:00
4. "Autumn in New York" (Vernon Duke) – 10:16
5. "Apache Dance" – 7:49
6. "Blondie’s Waltz – 5:50

== Personnel ==
- George Coleman – tenor saxophone
- Hilton Ruiz – piano
- Sam Jones – bass
- Billy Higgins – drums
