= In the World =

Studio album by Clifford Jordan
- Released: 1972
- Recorded: Spring 1969
- Studios: Town Sound Studios, Englewood, NJ
- Genre: Jazz
- Length: 40:11
- Labels: Strata-East; SES-19721
- Producer: Clifford Jordan

Clifford Jordan chronology
Soul Fountain (1966)	In the World (1972)	Glass Bead Games (1973)

In the World is an album by jazz saxophonist Clifford Jordan which was recorded in 1969 and released on the Strata-East label in 1972. The album was rereleased on CD as part of The Complete Clifford Jordan Strata-East Sessions by Mosaic Records in 2013.

== Reception ==
Professional ratings
Review scores
Source	Rating
Allmusic	4.5/5 stars
DownBeat	4.5/5 stars

The Allmusic review by Ken Dryden stated: "Whether at the helm of a record date or as a sideman, Clifford Jordan was known for giving his all. These studio recordings were originally made for Strata East, a label known for its adventurous spirit".

DownBeat reviewer Doug Ramsey assigned the album 4.5 stars. He wrote, "Jordan is impressive here on every count, as composer, soloist and leader." Ramsey praised the contributions of Kelly, Dorham, Priester and the rhythm sections, and said that "Jordan's solos are logical and passionate." "Really quite a lovely record, produced, not incidentally, by Jordan."

== Track listing ==
All compositions by Clifford Jordan

1. "Vienna" - 17:10
2. "Doug's Prelude" - 4:47
3. "Ouagoudougou" - 11:00
4. "872" - 7:14

== Personnel ==
- Clifford Jordan — tenor saxophone
- Don Cherry - cornet (tracks 1)
- Kenny Dorham - trumpet (tracks 3 & 4)
- Julian Priester - trombone
- Wynton Kelly - piano
- Richard Davis - cello, bass
- Wilbur Ware - bass (tracks 1 & 3)
- Ed Blackwell (tracks 3 & 4), Roy Haynes (tracks 3 & 4), Albert Heath (tracks 1 & 2) - drums
