= Farewell Keystone =

Live album by Bobby Hutcherson
- Released: 1988
- Recorded: July 10–11, 1982
- Venues: Keystone Korner, San Francisco, CA
- Genre: Jazz
- Length: 52:08 CD with bonus track
- Label: Theresa TR 124
- Producer: Bobby Hutcherson

Bobby Hutcherson chronology
In the Vanguard (1987)	Farewell Keystone (1988)	Cruisin' the 'Bird (1988)

Farewell Keystone is a live album by American jazz vibist Bobby Hutcherson recorded in 1982 at Keystone Korner in San Francisco and released on the Theresa label in 1988. The 1992 Evidence CD reissue added a bonus track.

== Reception ==
Allmusic awarded the album 4 stars stating "it is not surprising that the music is hard bop-oriented and of consistent high quality".

Professional ratings
Review scores
Source	Rating
Allmusic	4/5 stars

== Track listing ==
1. "Crescent Moon" (Billy Higgins) - 7:11
2. "Short Stuff" (Harold Land) - 6:47
3. "Prism" (Buster Williams) - 6:56
4. "Starting Over" (Head Start) - (Bobby Hutcherson) - 10:52
5. "Rubber Man" (Cedar Walton) - 6:53
6. "Mapenzi" (Land) - 13:29 Bonus track on CD reissue

== Personnel ==
- Bobby Hutcherson - vibraphone
- Oscar Brashear - trumpet and flugelhorn
- Harold Land - tenor saxophone
- Cedar Walton - piano
- Buster Williams - bass
- Billy Higgins - drums
