= Soul Fountain =

Studio album by Clifford Jordan
- Released: 1970
- Recorded: October 12 & 25, 1966; New York City
- Genre: Jazz
- Length: 38:13
- Label: Vortex; 2010
- Producer: Arif Mardin

Clifford Jordan chronology
These are My Roots: Clifford Jordan Plays Leadbelly (1965)	Soul Fountain (1970)	In the World (1969)

Soul Fountain is an album featuring jazz saxophonist Clifford Jordan which was recorded in 1966 and but not released on the Atlantic Records subsidiary Vortex label until 1970.

== Reception ==
Professional ratings
Review scores
Source	Rating
AllMusic	3.5/5 stars

The AllMusic review by Thom Jurek states: "as a jazz album with big fat grooves, stellar playing, and arrangements, it's a monster".

== Track listing ==
All compositions by Clifford Jordan,except as indicated.

1. "T.N.T." (Ben Tucker, Grady Tate, Bob Dorough) - 2:39
2. "I've Got a Feeling for You" - 3:00
3. "H.N.I.C." (Tate, Tucker) - 3:32
4. "I Got You (I Feel Good)" (James Brown) - 2:37
5. "Caribbean Cruise" - 2:07
6. "Señor Blues" (Horace Silver) - 5:42
7. "Eeh Bah Lickey Doo" - 4:05
8. "Retribution" (Abbey Lincoln) - 4:31

== Personnel ==
- Clifford Jordan - tenor saxophone, flute, piano
- Jimmy Owens - trumpet, flugelhorn
- Julian Priester - trombone
- John Patton - organ (tracks 6–8)
- Frank Owens - piano, organ (tracks 1–5)
- Ben Tucker - bass (tracks 1–5)
- Bob Cranshaw - bass, electric bass (tracks 1–5)
- Bobby Durham (tracks 1–5), Billy Higgins (tracks 6–8) - drums
- Ray Barretto - congas (tracks 6–8)
- Joe Wohletz - bongos, percussion
- Orestes Vilato - percussion (tracks 1–5)
