= The Rajah (album) =

Studio album by Lee Morgan
- Released: 1985
- Recorded: November 29, 1966
- Studio: Van Gelder Studio, Englewood Cliffs, NJ
- Genre: Jazz
- Length: 46:00
- Label: Blue Note; BST 84426
- Producer: Alfred Lion

Lee Morgan chronology
Charisma (1966)	The Rajah (1985)	Standards (1967)

The Rajah is an album by jazz trumpeter Lee Morgan released on the Blue Note label. It was recorded on November 29, 1966 but not released until 1985, and features performances by Morgan, Hank Mobley, Cedar Walton, Paul Chambers and Billy Higgins. The recording was found in the Blue Note vaults by Michael Cuscuna in 1984.

== Reception ==
The AllMusic review by Scott Yanow stated: "Despite its neglect, this is a fine session that Lee Morgan and hard bop fans will want."

Professional ratings
Review scores
Source	Rating
AllMusic	3/5 stars

== Track listing ==
1. "A Pilgrim's Funny Farm" (Massey) – 13:34
2. "The Rajah" (Morgan) – 9:10
3. "Is That So?" (Pearson) – 5:18
4. "Davisamba" (Davis) – 6:46
5. "What Now, My Love?" (Bécaud) – 5:22
6. "Once in a Lifetime" (Bricusse, Newley) – 5:50

== Personnel ==
- Lee Morgan – trumpet
- Hank Mobley – tenor saxophone
- Cedar Walton – piano
- Paul Chambers – bass
- Billy Higgins – drums
