= Images (Sonny Red album) =

Studio album by Sonny Red
- Released: 1962
- Recorded: June 25 & December 14, 1961; Plaza Sound Studios, New York City
- Genre: Jazz
- Label: Jazzland; JLP 74
- Producer: Orrin Keepnews and Bill Grauer

Sonny Red chronology
The Mode (1961)	Images (1962)	Sonny Red (1971)

Images is an album by American saxophonist Sonny Red, featuring tracks recorded in 1961 with Barry Harris, and Blue Mitchell or Grant Green, which was released on the Jazzland label.

== Reception ==
Professional ratings
Review scores
Source	Rating
Down Beat	2.5/5 stars
Allmusic	3/5 stars

Allmusic awarded the album 3 stars stating "The leader, Sonny Red Kyner (alto), never really became the individual strong player that his playing hinted he might develop into. Basically he was in the Charlie Parker-Jackie McLean tradition, and the material here had that spirit, but little punch".

== Track listing ==
All compositions by Sonny Red except as indicated

1. "Images" - 6:25
2. "Blues for Donna" - 4:44
3. "Dodge City" - 5:16
4. "Bewitched, Bothered and Bewildered" (Lorenz Hart, Richard Rodgers) - 5:41
5. "Blue Sonny" - 8:29
6. "The Rhythm Thing"
- Recorded at Plaza Sound Studios in New York City on June 25 (tracks 1–3) and December 14 (tracks 4–6), 1961

== Personnel ==
- Sonny Red - alto saxophone
- Blue Mitchell - trumpet (tracks 1–3)
- Grant Green - guitar (tracks 5–6)
- Barry Harris - piano
- George Tucker - bass
- Jimmy Cobb (tracks 4–6), Lex Humphries (tracks 1–3) - drums
