= On Stage Vol. 1 =

Live album by Clifford Jordan & The Magic Triangle
- Released: 1977
- Recorded: March 29, 1975; The Bimhaus, Amsterdam, Holland
- Genre: Jazz
- Length: 40:53
- Label: SteepleChase; SCS-1071
- Producer: Nils Winther

Clifford Jordan chronology
Night of the Mark VII (1975)	On Stage Vol. 1 (1977)	On Stage Vol. 2 (1975)

On Stage Vol. 1 is a live album by saxophonist Clifford Jordan which was recorded in Holland in 1975 and first released on the SteepleChase label in 1977.

== Reception ==
Professional ratings
Review scores
Source	Rating
Allmusic	3/5 stars
The Rolling Stone Jazz Record Guide	4/5 stars
The Penguin Guide to Jazz Recordings	3/4 stars

In his review on Allmusic, Scott Yanow says that "the musicians sound inspired by each other's presence, and there are many strong solos from Jordan and Walton. Well worth investigating".

== Track listing ==
All compositions by Clifford Jordan except as indicated

1. "Pinocchio" (Wayne Shorter) - 7:27
2. "That Old Devil Moon" (Yip Harburg, Burton Lane) - 13:10
3. "The Maestro" (Cedar Walton) - 6:08
4. "The Highest Mountain" - 14:08

== Personnel ==
- Clifford Jordan - tenor saxophone
- Cedar Walton - piano
- Sam Jones - bass
- Billy Higgins - drums
