= On Stage Vol. 2 =

Live album by Clifford Jordan & The Magic Triangle
- Released: 1978
- Recorded: March 29, 1975; The Bimhaus, Amsterdam, Holland
- Genre: Jazz
- Length: 42:20
- Label: SteepleChase; SCS-1092
- Producer: Nils Winther

Clifford Jordan chronology
On Stage Vol. 1 (1975)	On Stage Vol. 2 (1978)	On Stage Vol. 3 (1975)

On Stage Vol. 2 is a live album by saxophonist Clifford Jordan which was recorded in Holland in 1975 and first released on the SteepleChase label in 1978.

== Reception ==
Professional ratings
Review scores
Source	Rating
Allmusic	3/5 stars
The Penguin Guide to Jazz Recordings	3/4 stars

In his review on Allmusic, Ken Dryden states that "The second of three volumes recorded in 1975 featuring tenorist Clifford Jordan with Cedar Walton, Sam Jones, and Billy Higgins finds the quartet in top form".

== Track listing ==
1. "Midnight Waltz" (Cedar Walton) - 15:59
2. "Bleecker Street Theme" (Walton) - 1:05
3. "I Should Care" (Sammy Cahn, Axel Stordahl, Paul Weston) - 10:09
4. "Stella by Starlight" (Ned Washington, Victor Young) - 10:25
5. "Alias Buster Henry" (Billy Higgins) - 4:42 Bonus track on CD reissue

== Personnel ==
- Clifford Jordan - tenor saxophone
- Cedar Walton - piano
- Sam Jones - bass
- Billy Higgins - drums
