= Generation (Dexter Gordon album) =

Studio album by Dexter Gordon
- Released: 1973
- Recorded: July 22, 1972
- Studio: Van Gelder Studio, Englewood Cliffs, New Jersey
- Genre: Jazz
- Length: 41:35
- Label: Prestige; PR 10069
- Producer: Ozzie Cadena

Dexter Gordon chronology
Tangerine (1972)	Generation (1973)	The Apartment (1974)

Generation is an album by saxophonist Dexter Gordon which was recorded in 1972 and released on the Prestige label.

== Reception ==
Professional ratings
Review scores
Source	Rating
AllMusic	4/5 stars
DownBeat	4/5 stars
The Penguin Guide to Jazz Recordings	3/4 stars
The Rolling Stone Jazz Record Guide	3/5 stars

Scott Yanow of AllMusic states, "Veteran tenor-saxophonist Dexter Gordon welcomed trumpeter Freddie Hubbard to his recording group several times during his career and each collaboration was quite rewarding.... This CD should please collectors".

== Track listing ==
1. "Milestones" (John Lewis) – 8:56
2. "Scared to Be Alone" (André Previn) – 7:39
3. "We See" (Thelonious Monk) – 11:18
4. "The Group" (Dexter Gordon) – 6:33
5. "Milestones" [alternate take] (Lewis) – 7:09 Bonus track on CD reissue

== Personnel ==
- Dexter Gordon – tenor saxophone
- Freddie Hubbard – trumpet, flugelhorn
- Cedar Walton – piano
- Buster Williams – bass
- Billy Higgins – drums
