= Delightfulee =

Studio album by Lee Morgan
- Released: Early November 1967
- Recorded: April 8 & May 27, 1966
- Studio: Van Gelder Studio, Englewood Cliffs, NJ
- Genre: Jazz
- Length: 38:29 original LP; 68:00 CD reissue
- Label: Blue Note; BST 84243
- Producer: Alfred Lion

Lee Morgan chronology
Infinity (1965)	Delightfulee (1967)	Charisma (1966)

Delightfulee is an album by jazz trumpeter Lee Morgan released on the Blue Note label in 1967. It was recorded on April 8 & May 27, 1966 and features performances by Morgan with a quintet featuring Joe Henderson, McCoy Tyner, Bob Cranshaw and Billy Higgins and a big band featuring Ernie Royal, Tom McIntosh, Jim Buffington, Don Butterfield, Phil Woods, Wayne Shorter, Danny Bank and Philly Joe Jones with arrangements by Oliver Nelson.

== Reception ==
The Allmusic review by Michael G. Nastos awarded the album 4½ stars stating "For some this will always be an oddball release of Morgan's, but it does suggest moving on into what would be a fruitful and successful final five years".

Professional ratings
Review scores
Source	Rating
Allmusic	4.5/5 stars
DownBeat	5/5 stars

== Track listing ==
All compositions by Lee Morgan except where noted

1. "Ca-Lee-So" - 5:34
2. "Zambia" - 6:33
3. "Yesterday" (John Lennon, Paul McCartney) - 5:49
4. "Sunrise, Sunset" (Jerry Bock, Sheldon Harnick) - 6:17
5. "Nite Flite" - 7:38
6. "The Delightful Deggie" - 6:38
7. "Need I?" - 7:11 Bonus track on CD
8. "Filet of Soul (aka Hoppin' John)" - 8:30 Bonus track on CD
9. "Zambia" [Big Band Version] - 8:01 Bonus track on CD
10. "The Delightful Deggie" [Big Band Version] - 5:49 Bonus track on CD

Recorded on April 8 (#3, 4, 7-10) & May 27 (#1, 2, 5, 6), 1966.

== Personnel ==
Tracks 1, 2, 5, 6

- Lee Morgan - trumpet
- Joe Henderson - tenor saxophone
- McCoy Tyner - piano
- Bob Cranshaw - bass
- Billy Higgins - drums

Tracks 3, 4, 7-10

- Lee Morgan, Ernie Royal - trumpet
- Tom McIntosh - trombone
- Jim Buffington - French horn
- Don Butterfield - tuba
- Phil Woods - alto saxophone, flute
- Wayne Shorter - tenor saxophone
- Danny Bank - baritone saxophone, bass clarinet, flute
- McCoy Tyner - piano
- Bob Cranshaw - bass
- Philly Joe Jones - drums
- Oliver Nelson - arranger
