= Breakthrough! (album) =

Studio album by Cedar Walton/Hank Mobley Quintet
- Released: April 1972
- Recorded: February 22, 1972
- Studio: Bell Sound (New York City)
- Genre: Jazz
- Label: Cobblestone / Muse
- Producer: Don Schlitten

Hank Mobley chronology
Thinking of Home (1970)	Breakthrough! (1972)	Newark 1953 (2012)

Cedar Walton chronology
Soul Cycle (1969)	Breakthrough! (1972)	A Night at Boomers, Vol. 1 (1973)

Muse Records Cover

Professional ratings
Review scores
Source	Rating
Allmusic	3/5 stars
DownBeat	4.5/5 stars

Breakthrough! is an album by the Cedar Walton/Hank Mobley Quintet recorded on February 22, 1972, originally released on the short-lived Cobblestone label and later reissued on Muse. It features performances by Mobley and Walton with baritone saxophonist Charles Davis, bassist Sam Jones, and Mobley's longtime drummer Billy Higgins. This was Mobley's final studio recording before retiring due to health issues.

== Reception ==
The Allmusic review by Scott Yanow states: "As strong as pianist Cedar Walton plays on his session, the main honors are taken by two of his sidemen. Tenor-saxophonist Hank Mobley, whose career was about to go into a complete eclipse, is in brilliant form, showing how much he had grown since his earlier days. Baritonist Charles Davis, who too often through the years has been used as merely a section player, keeps up with Mobley and engages in a particularly memorable tradeoff on the lengthy title cut. Mobley is well-showcased on 'Summertime,' Davis switches successfully to soprano on 'Early Morning Stroll,' and Walton (with the trio) somehow turns the 'Theme From Love Story' into jazz. Highly recommended."

== Track listing ==
1. "Breakthrough" (Hank Mobley) – 10:38
2. "Sabiá" (Antônio Carlos Jobim, Chico Buarque) – 4:15
3. "House on Maple Street" (Cedar Walton) – 6:42
4. "(Where Do I Begin?) Love Story" (Francis Lai, Carl Sigman) – 6:13
5. "Summertime" (George Gershwin, Ira Gershwin, DuBose Heyward) – 7:41
6. "18th Hole [listed as Early Morning Stroll]" (Mobley) – 8:07

== Personnel ==
- Hank Mobley – tenor saxophone
- Cedar Walton – piano, electric piano
- Charles Davis – soprano saxophone, baritone saxophone
- Sam Jones – double bass
- Billy Higgins – drums
