= Beyond Mobius =

Studio album by Cedar Walton
- Released: 1976
- Recorded: 1976
- Studio: RCA Studios, New York City
- Genre: Jazz
- Label: RCA; APL1 1435
- Producer: Mike Lipskin

Cedar Walton chronology
The Pentagon (1976)	Beyond Mobius (1976)	Eastern Rebellion 2 (1977)

Beyond Mobius is an album by pianist Cedar Walton recorded in 1976 and released on the RCA label.

== Track listing ==
All compositions by Cedar Walton except as indicated

1. "Bad Luck" (Victor Carstarphen, Gene McFadden & John Whitehead) - 4:24
2. "Low Rider" (War, Jerry Goldstein) - 6:24
3. "Beyond Mobius" - 5:20
4. "Jive Talkin'" (Barry Gibb, Robin Gibb, Maurice Gibb) - 4:35
5. "Canadian Sunset" (Eddie Heywood, Norman Gimbel) - 5:22
6. "The Girl with Discotheque Eyes" (Walton, Mike Lipskin) - 7:24
7. "Lonely Cathedral" - 6:20

== Personnel ==
- Cedar Walton - keyboards, synthesizer arranger, conductor
- Burt Collins, Jon Faddis, Blue Mitchell - trumpet, flugelhorn
- Wayne Andre, Alan Raph - trombone
- George Marge, Eddie Harris - tenor saxophone
- Norman Carr, Harry Cykman, David Moore, Morris Sutow - strings
- Cornell Dupree, Eric Gale - rhythm guitar
- Gordon Edwards - bass
- Charles Collins, Jimmie Young - drums
- Angel Allende - percussion
- Mike Lipskin - percussion, ARP synthesizer, voice, string arranger, string conductor
- Alan Abrahams, Adrienne Albert, Yolanda McCullough, Maeretha Stewart - voice
- Rod Levitt - horn arranger, horn conductor, string arranger, string conductor
