= Glass Bead Games =

Album by Clifford Jordan

Studio album by Clifford Jordan
- Released: 1974
- Recorded: October 29, 1973
- Studio: Minot Sound Studios, White Plains, NY
- Genre: Jazz
- Length: 63:40
- Label: Strata-East; SES-19738
- Producer: Clifford Jordan

Clifford Jordan chronology
In the World (1969)	Glass Bead Games (1974)	Half Note (1974)

Glass Bead Games is a double album by jazz saxophonist Clifford Jordan which was recorded in 1973 and released on the Strata-East label. The album was re-released on CD as part of The Complete Clifford Jordan Strata-East Sessions by Mosaic Records in 2013.

== Reception ==
Professional ratings
Review scores
Source	Rating
AllMusic	5/5 stars

The AllMusic review by Ken Dryden stated, "Clifford Jordan's two volumes of sessions under the title Glass Bead Games have long been heralded as some of the most important work of his career." Writing for All About Jazz, Samuel Chell enthused "To call the playing 'remarkable' is to do it an injustice: rather, it's exemplary as a record of one instance of tapping into and then realizing the potential of the vast energy field that is human consciousness."

== Track listing ==
All compositions by Clifford Jordan except where noted.

1. "Powerful Paul Robeson" – 5:42
2. "Glass Bead Games" – 4:36
3. "Prayer to the People" – 4:16
4. "Cal Massey" (Stanley Cowell) – 2:42
5. "John Coltrane" (Bill Lee, Clifton Lee) – 6:48
6. "Eddie Harris" (Lee) – 4:19
7. "Biskit" (Lee) – 5:28
8. "Shoulders" (Cedar Walton) – 5:19
9. "Bridgework" (Walton) – 3:47
10. "Maimoun" (Cowell) – 5:40
11. "Alias Buster Henry" – 8:16 (Billy Higgins)
12. "One for Amos" – 6:47 (Sam Jones)

== Personnel ==
- Clifford Jordan – tenor saxophone
- Stanley Cowell (tracks 1, 4–7, 10 & 11), Cedar Walton (tracks 2, 3, 8, 9 & 12) – piano
- Bill Lee (tracks 1, 4–7, 10 & 11), Sam Jones (tracks 2, 3, 8, 9 & 12) – bass
- Billy Higgins – drums, percussion
