= Pike's Groove =

Studio album by Dave Pike with the Cedar Walton Trio
- Released: 1986
- Recorded: February 5, 1986
- Studio: Studio 44, Monster, Netherlands
- Genre: Jazz
- Length: 51:43 CD reissue with additional tracks
- Label: Criss Cross Jazz; Criss 1021
- Producer: Gerry Teekens

Dave Pike chronology
Moon Bird (1983)	Pike's Groove (1986)	Bluebird (1989)

Pike's Groove is an album led by vibraphonist Dave Pike which was recorded in 1986 and released by the Criss Cross Jazz label.

== Reception ==
Professional ratings
Review scores
Source	Rating
AllMusic	4.5/5 stars
The Penguin Guide to Jazz Recordings	2.5/4 stars

The AllMusic review by Scott Yanow states "Vibraphonist Dave Pike has recorded in a variety of settings through the years. His Criss Cross date is one of his finest straight-ahead outings ... Highly recommended".

== Track listing ==
1. "Big Foot" (Charlie Parker) – 4:13
2. "Spring Can Really Hang You Up the Most" (Tommy Wolf, Fran Landesman) – 5:49
3. "You're My Everything" (Harry Warren, Mort Dixon, Joe Young) – 3:42
4. "Ornithology" (Parker, Benny Harris) – 6:33
5. "Con Alma" (Dizzy Gillespie) – 6:49
6. "Reflections in Blue" (Dave Pike) – 8:28
7. "Birk's Works" (Gillespie) – 6:06
8. "You're My Everything" [alternate take] (Warren, Dixon, Young) – 5:31 Additional track on CD reissue
9. "Big Foot" [alternate take] (Parker) – 4:32 Additional track on CD reissue

== Personnel ==
- Dave Pike – vibraphone
- Cedar Walton − piano
- David Williams − bass
- Billy Higgins - drums
