= Newark 1953 =

Live album by Hank Mobley
- Released: April 17, 2012
- Recorded: September 28, 1953
- Genre: Jazz
- Length: 107:25
- Label: Uptown
- Producer: Robert E. Sunenblick

Hank Mobley chronology
Breakthrough! (1972)	Newark 1953 (2012)

Professional ratings
Review scores
Source	Rating
Allmusic	4/5 stars

Newark 1953 is a 2-CD set by American jazz saxophonist Hank Mobley recorded in September 1953 but released only in 2012 via Uptown Records label. This collection is billed as his earliest-known recordings. However, The Max Roach Quartet featuring Hank Mobley was recorded for the Debut label in April 1953.

== Background ==
The tracks were recorded live at The Piccadilly Club, New Jersey, on Monday, September 28, 1953, by Newark native Ozzie Cadena, who would join Savoy a year later as a producer.

== Track listing ==
Disc 1
No.	Title	Writer(s)	Length
1.	"Ow"	John Birks Gillespie	12:59
2.	"There's a Small Hotel"	Lorenz Hart, Richard Rodgers	13:09
3.	"Ballad Medley: Darn That Dream / Where or When / In Love in Vain / Stardust"	Hoagy Carmichael, Eddie DeLange, Lorenz Hart, James Van Heusen, Jerome Kern, Mitchell Parish, Leo Robin, Richard Rodgers	10:04
4.	"All the Things You Are"	Oscar Hammerstein II, Jerome Kern	9:10
5.	"Jumpin' with Symphony Sid"	Lester Young	9:36
Total length:			55:02

Disc 2
No.	Title	Writer(s)	Length
1.	"Announcement"		0:19
2.	"Lullaby of Birdland"	George Shearing	3:51
3.	"Embraceable You"	George Gershwin, Ira Gershwin	4:23
4.	"Keen and Peachy"	Ralph Burns, Shorty Rogers	10:25
5.	"Pennies from Heaven"	Johnny Burke, Arthur Johnston	16:21
6.	"Blues Is Green"	Bennie Green	8:39
7.	"'S Wonderful"	George Gershwin, Ira Gershwin	8:20
Total length:			52:23

== Personnel ==
- Hank Mobley – tenor sax
- Bennie Green – trombone
- Walter Davis Jr. – piano
- Jimmy Schenck – bass
- Charli Persip – drums
