= Firm Roots (Clifford Jordan album) =

Studio album by Clifford Jordan & The Magic Triangle
- Released: 1975
- Recorded: April 18, 1975
- Studio: Trixi Ton, Munich, West Germany
- Genre: Jazz
- Length: 48:48
- Label: SteepleChase; SCS-1033
- Producer: Nils Winther

Clifford Jordan chronology
On Stage Vol. 3 (1975)	Firm Roots (1975)	The Highest Mountain (1975)

Firm Roots is an album by saxophonist Clifford Jordan which was recorded in West Germany in 1975 and first released on the Danish SteepleChase label but also released in the US by Inner City.

== Reception ==
Professional ratings
Review scores
Source	Rating
AllMusic	4/5 stars
The Rolling Stone Jazz Record Guide	4/5 stars
The Penguin Guide to Jazz Recordings	3/4 stars

In his review on AllMusic, Ron Wynn called the album "One of Jordan's best releases with The Magic Triangle ensemble."

== Track listing ==
1. "Firm Roots" (Cedar Walton) – 8:43
2. "Angel in the Night" (Billy Higgins) – 8:56
3. "Scorpio" (Sam Jones) – 3:50
4. "Bear Cat" (Clifford Jordan) – 4:49 Bonus track on CD reissue
5. "Inga" (Higgins) – 7:57
6. "Voices Deep Within Me" (Walton) – 6:28
7. "One for Amos" (Jones) – 8:27

== Personnel ==
- Clifford Jordan – tenor saxophone; flute on "Angel in the Night"
- Cedar Walton – piano
- Sam Jones – bass
- Billy Higgins – drums
