= Night of the Mark VII =

Live album by Clifford Jordan
- Released: 1975
- Recorded: March 26, 1975; Paris, France
- Genre: Jazz
- Length: 42:49
- Label: Muse; MR 5045
- Producer: Becky Wisdom

Clifford Jordan chronology
Half Note (1974)	Night of the Mark VII (1975)	On Stage Vol. 1 (1975)

Night of the Mark VII is a live album by saxophonist Clifford Jordan which was recorded in 1975 and first released on the Muse label.

== Reception ==
Professional ratings
Review scores
Source	Rating
AllMusic	4/5 stars
The Rolling Stone Jazz Record Guide	4/5 stars
The Penguin Guide to Jazz Recordings	3/4 stars

In his review on AllMusic, Scott Yanow notes that "Overall, Night of the Mark 7 features high-quality hard bop from four of the greats of the idiom, so it is easily recommended to those not already owning the music."

== Track listing ==
1. "John Coltrane" (Bill Lee) – 7:45
2. "Highest Mountain" (Clifford Jordan) – 6:02
3. "Blue Monk" (Thelonious Monk) – 7:20
4. "One for Amos" [listed as Midnight Waltz on all issues] (Sam Jones) – 10:53
5. "Midnight Waltz" [listed as One for Amos on all issues] (Cedar Walton) – 10:49

== Personnel ==
- Clifford Jordan – tenor saxophone
- Cedar Walton – piano
- Sam Jones – bass
- Billy Higgins – drums
