= Animation (Cedar Walton album) =

Studio album by Cedar Walton
- Released: 1978
- Recorded: 1977–1978; Electric Lady Studios, NYC
- Genre: Jazz
- Label: Columbia; JC 35572
- Producer: George Butler and Cedar Walton

Cedar Walton chronology
Third Set (1977)	Animation (1978)	Eastern Rebellion 3 (1979)

Animation is an album by pianist Cedar Walton recorded in 1978 and released on the Columbia label.

== Reception ==
Professional ratings
Review scores
Source	Rating
Allmusic	2.5/5 stars
DownBeat	4/5 stars

Allmusic awarded the album 2½ stars. DownBeat gave the release 4 stars.

== Track listing ==
All compositions by Cedar Walton except as indicated

1. "Animation" - 5:00
2. "Jacob's Ladder" - 5:44
3. "Charmed Circle" - 5:22
4. "Another Star" (Stevie Wonder) - 5:43
5. "Precious Mountain" - 4:59
6. "March of the Fishman" - 4:36
7. "If It Could Happen" (Tony Dumas) - 5:19
8. "Ala Eduardo" - 5:00

== Personnel ==
- Cedar Walton - piano, electric piano, arranger
- Steve Turre - trombone, bass trombone
- Bob Berg - tenor saxophone
- Tony Dumas - electric bass
- Al Foster (tracks 1, 3 & 4), Buddy Williams - drums
- Paulinho Da Costa - percussion
