= The Chant (album) =

Studio album by Sam Jones Plus 10
- Released: 1961
- Recorded: January 13 & 26, 1961; Plaza Sound Studios, New York City
- Genre: Jazz
- Length: 40:26
- Label: Riverside; RLP 358
- Producer: Orrin Keepnews

Sam Jones chronology
The Soul Society (1960)	The Chant (1961)	Down Home (1962)

The Chant is the second album by bassist and cellist Sam Jones featuring performances recorded in early 1961 and originally released on the Riverside label.

== Reception ==
Professional ratings
Review scores
Source	Rating
Allmusic	4.5/5 stars
The Penguin Guide to Jazz Recordings	3/4 stars

Scott Yanow of Allmusic says, "all eight selections in this straightahead set are rewarding".

== Track listing ==
1. "The Chant" (Victor Feldman) – 3:24
2. "Four" (Miles Davis) – 4:23
3. "Blues on Down" (Benny Golson) – 5:45
4. "Sonny Boy" (Lew Brown, Bud DeSylva, Ray Henderson) – 4:54
5. "In Walked Ray" (Sam Jones) – 4:04
6. "Bluebird" (Charlie Parker) – 4:10
7. "Over the Rainbow" (Harold Arlen, Yip Harburg) – 6:37
8. "Off Color" (Rudy Stevenson) – 4:26

== Personnel ==
- Sam Jones – bass (tracks 1–3 & 8), cello (tracks 4–7)
- Nat Adderley – cornet
- Blue Mitchell – trumpet
- Melba Liston – trombone
- Cannonball Adderley – alto saxophone
- Jimmy Heath – tenor saxophone
- Tate Houston – baritone saxophone
- Wynton Kelly – piano (tracks 4, 6 & 7)
- Victor Feldman – piano (tracks 1–3, 5 & 8), vibraphone (tracks 4–7)
- Les Spann – guitar (tracks 1, 2, 3 & 8)
- Keter Betts – bass (tracks 4–7)
- Louis Hayes – drums
