= Half Note =

Live album by Clifford Jordan
- Released: 1985
- Recorded: April 5, 1974; Half Note, NYC
- Genre: Jazz
- Length: 49:16
- Label: SteepleChase; SCCD 31198
- Producer: Nils Winther

Clifford Jordan chronology
| Glass Bead Games (1973) | Half Note (1985) | Night of the Mark VII (1975) |

Half Note is a live album by saxophonist Clifford Jordan which was recorded in 1974 and first released on the SteepleChase label in 1985.

== Reception ==
Professional ratings
Review scores
| Source | Rating |
|---|---|
| Allmusic | 3/5 stars |
| The Penguin Guide to Jazz | 3/4 stars |

In his review on Allmusic, Scott Yanow notes that this is "An good example of Jordan's music"

== Track listing ==
All compositions by Clifford Jordan except as indicated

1. "Holy Land" (Cedar Walton) - 8:41
2. "The Glass Bead Games" - 5:38
3. "St. Thomas" (Sonny Rollins) - 9:58
4. "Rhythm-a-Ning" (Thelonious Monk) - 8:57
5. "Midnight Waltz" (Walton) - 9:17
6. "The Highest Mountain" - 6:45

== Personnel ==
- Clifford Jordan - tenor saxophone
- Cedar Walton - piano
- Sam Jones - bass
- Albert Heath - drums
