= Billy Higgins =

American jazz drummer (1936–2001)

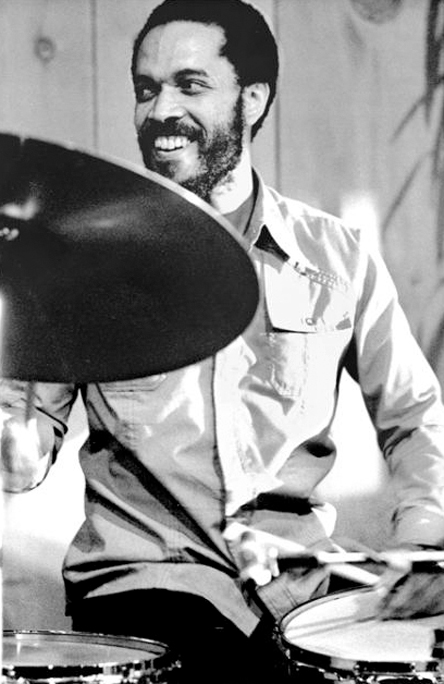
- Higgins in 1978.

Background information
- Born: October 11, 1936; Los Angeles, California, U.S.
- Died: May 3, 2001 (aged 64) Inglewood, California, U.S.
- Genre: Jazz
- Occupations: Musician, educator
- Instrument: Drums
- Formerly of: Ornette Coleman, Herbie Hancock, Cedar Walton, Charles Lloyd, Pat Metheny

Billy Higgins (October 11, 1936 – May 3, 2001) was an American jazz drummer. He played mainly free jazz and hard bop.

== Biography ==
Higgins was born in Los Angeles, California, United States. Higgins played on Ornette Coleman's first records, beginning in 1958. He then freelanced extensively with hard bop and other post-bop players, including Donald Byrd, Dexter Gordon, Grant Green, Herbie Hancock, Joe Henderson, Don Cherry, Paul Horn, Milt Jackson, Jackie McLean, Pat Metheny, Hank Mobley, Thelonious Monk, Lee Morgan, David Murray, Art Pepper, Sonny Rollins, Mal Waldron, and Cedar Walton. He was one of the house drummers for Blue Note Records and played on dozens of Blue Note albums of the 1960s. He also collaborated with composer La Monte Young and guitarist Sandy Bull.

In his career, Higgins played on more than 700 recordings, including recordings of rock and funk. He appeared as a jazz drummer in the 1986 movie Round Midnight and the 2001 movie Southlander.

In 1989, Higgins cofounded a cultural center, The World Stage, in Los Angeles to encourage and promote younger jazz musicians. The center provides workshops in performance and writing, as well as concerts and recordings. Higgins also taught in the jazz studies program at the University of California, Los Angeles.

Billy Higgins died of kidney and liver failure on May 3, 2001, at a hospital in Inglewood, California.

== Discography ==
=== As leader ===
- 1979: Soweto (Red)
- 1979: The Soldier (Timeless, [1981])
- 1980: Once More (Red)
- 1984: Mr. Billy Higgins (Evidence)
- 1980-86: Bridgework (Contemporary)
- 1994: ¾ for Peace (Red)
- 1997: Billy Higgins Quintet (Evidence)
- 2001: The Best of Summer Nights at Moca (Exodus)

=== As a sideman ===
==== With Gene Ammons and Sonny Stitt ====
- God Bless Jug and Sonny (Prestige, 1973 [2001])
- Left Bank Encores (Prestige, 1973 [2001])

==== With Chris Anderson ====
- Blues One (DIW, 1991)

==== With Gary Bartz ====
- Libra (Milestone, 1968)

==== With Paul Bley ====
- Live at the Hilcrest Club 1958 (Inner City, 1958 [1976])
- Coleman Classics Volume 1 (Improvising Artists, 1958 [1977])

==== With Sandy Bull ====
- Fantasias for Guitar and Banjo (Vanguard, 1963)
- Inventions (Vanguard, 1965)

==== With Jaki Byard ====
- On the Spot! (Prestige, 1967)

==== With Donald Byrd ====
- Royal Flush (Blue Note, 1961)
- Free Form (Blue Note, 1962)
- Blackjack (Blue Note, 1967)
- Slow Drag (Blue Note, 1967)

==== With Joe Castro ====
- Groove Funk Soul (Atlantic, 1959)

==== With Don Cherry ====
- Brown Rice (EMI, 1975)
- Art Deco (A&M, 1988)

==== With Sonny Clark ====
- Leapin' and Lopin' (Blue Note, 1961)

==== With George Coleman ====
- Amsterdam After Dark (Timeless, 1979)

==== With Ornette Coleman ====
- Something Else!!!! (Contemporary, 1958)
- The Shape of Jazz to Come (Atlantic, 1959)
- Change of the Century (Atlantic, 1959)
- The Art of the Improvisers (Atlantic, 1959)
- To Whom Who Keeps a Record (Warner, 1959–60)
- Free Jazz: A Collective Improvisation (Atlantic, 1961)
- Twins (Atlantic, 1961)
- Science Fiction (Columbia, 1971)
- Broken Shadows (Columbia, 1971–1972 [1982])
- The Complete Science Fiction Sessions (Columbia, 1971–1972 [2000])
- In All Languages (Caravan of Dreams, 1987)

==== With John Coltrane ====
- Like Sonny (Roulette, 1960)

==== With Junior Cook ====
- Somethin's Cookin' (Muse, 1981)

==== With Bill Cosby ====
- Hello, Friend: To Ennis with Love (Verve, 1997)

==== With Stanley Cowell ====
- Regeneration (Strata East, 1976)

==== With Ray Drummond ====
- The Essence (DMP, 1985)

==== With Teddy Edwards ====
- Teddy Edwards at Falcon's Lair (MetroJazz, 1958)
- Sunset Eyes (Pacific Jazz, 1960)
- Teddy's Ready! (Contemporary, 1960)
- Nothin' But the Truth! (Prestige, 1966)
- Young at Heart (Storyville, 1979) with Howard McGhee
- Wise in Time (Storyville, 1979) with Howard McGhee
- Mississippi Lad (Verve/Gitanes, 1991)
- Tango in Harlem (Verve/Gitanes, 1994)

==== With Booker Ervin ====
- Tex Book Tenor (Blue Note, 1968)

==== With Art Farmer ====
- Homecoming (Mainstream, 1971)
- Yesterday's Thoughts (East Wind, 1975)
- To Duke with Love (East Wind, 1975)
- The Summer Knows (East Wind, 1976)
- Art Farmer Quintet at Boomers (East Wind, 1976)

==== With Curtis Fuller ====
- Smokin' (Mainstream, 1972)

==== With Stan Getz ====
- Cal Tjader-Stan Getz Sextet (1958, Fantasy) with Cal Tjader

==== With Dexter Gordon ====
- Go (Blue Note, 1962)
- A Swingin' Affair (Blue Note, 1962)
- Clubhouse (Blue Note, 1965 – released 1979)
- Gettin' Around (Blue Note, 1965)
- Tangerine (Prestige, 1972 [1975])
- Generation (Prestige, 1972)
- Something Different (SteepleChase, 1975 [1980])
- Bouncin' with Dex (SteepleChase, 1976)
- The Other Side of Round Midnight (Blue Note, 1985)

==== With Grant Green ====
- First Session (Blue Note, 1961)
- Goin' West (Blue Note, 1962)
- Feelin' the Spirit (Blue Note, 1962)

==== With Dodo Greene ====
- My Hour of Need (Blue Note, 1962)

==== With Charlie Haden ====
- Quartet West (Verve, 1986)
- Silence (Soul Note, 1987)
- The Private Collection (Naim, 1987-88 [2000])
- First Song (Soul Note, 1990 [1992])

==== With Al Haig ====
- Chelsea Bridge (East Wind EW-8023, 1975)

==== With Slide Hampton ====
- Roots (Criss Cross, 1985)

==== With Herbie Hancock ====
- Takin' Off (Blue Note, 1962)
- Round Midnight (soundtrack) (Columbia, 1985)

==== With Roy Hargrove ====
- Public Eye (Novus/RCA, 1991)

==== With Barry Harris ====
- Bull's Eye! (Prestige, 1968)

==== With Eddie Harris ====
- The In Sound (Atlantic, 1965)
- Mean Greens (Atlantic, 1966)
- The Tender Storm (Atlantic, 1966)
- Excursions (Atlantic, 1966–73)
- How Can You Live Like That? (Atlantic, 1976)

==== With Johnny Hartman ====
- Today (Perception, 1972)

==== With Jimmy Heath ====
- Love and Understanding (Muse, 1973)
- The Time and the Place (Landmark, 1974 [1994])
- Picture of Heath (Xanadu, 1975)

==== With Joe Henderson ====
- Mirror Mirror (MPS, 1980)

==== With Andrew Hill ====
- Dance with Death (Blue Note, 1968 – not released until 1980)

==== With Christopher Hollyday ====
- Christopher Hollyday (BMG, 1989)

==== With Richard "Groove" Holmes ====
- Get Up & Get It! (Prestige, 1967)

==== With Paul Horn ====
- Something Blue (HiFi Jazz, 1960)

==== With Toninho Horta ====
- Once I Loved (Verve, 1992)

==== With Freddie Hubbard ====
- Bolivia (Music Master, 1991)

==== With Bobby Hutcherson ====
- Stick-Up (Blue Note, 1969)
- Solo / Quartet (Contemporary, 1982)
- Farewell Keystone (Theresa, 1982 [1988])
- Color Schemes (Landmark, 1985 [1986])

==== With J. J. Johnson ====
- Pinnacles (Milestone, 1980)

==== With Hank Jones and Dave Holland ====
- The Oracle (EmArcy, 1990)

==== With Sam Jones ====
- Seven Minds (East Wind Records, 1974)
- Cello Again (Xanadu, 1976)
- Something in Common (Muse, 1977)

==== With Clifford Jordan ====
- Soul Fountain (Vortex, 1966 [1970])
- Glass Bead Games (Strata-East, 1974)
- Night of the Mark VII (Muse, 1975)
- On Stage Vol. 1 (SteepleChase, 1975 [1977])
- On Stage Vol. 2 (SteepleChase, 1975 [1978])
- On Stage Vol. 3 (SteepleChase, 1975 [1979])
- Firm Roots (Steeplechase, 1975)
- The Highest Mountain (Steeplechase, 1975)

==== With Fred Katz ====
- Fred Katz and his Jammers (Decca, 1959)

==== With Steve Lacy ====
- Evidence (New Jazz, 1962) with Don Cherry

==== With Charles Lloyd ====
- Acoustic Masters I (Atlantic, 1993)
- Voice in the Night (ECM, 1999)
- The Water Is Wide (ECM, 2000)
- Hyperion with Higgins (ECM, 2001, released posthumously)
- Which Way Is East (ECM, 2004, released posthumously)

==== With Pat Martino ====
- The Visit! (Cobblestone, 1972) also released as Footprints

==== With Jackie McLean ====
- A Fickle Sonance (Blue Note, 1961)
- Let Freedom Ring Blue Note, 1962)
- Vertigo (Blue Note, 1962–63)
- Action Action Action (Blue Note, 1964)
- Consequence (Blue Note, 1965 [2005])
- New and Old Gospel (Blue Note, 1967)

==== With Charles McPherson ====
- The Quintet/Live! (Prestige, 1966)
- Horizons (Prestige, 1968)
- Today's Man (Mainstream, 1973)

==== With Pat Metheny ====
- Rejoicing (ECM, 1984)

==== With Blue Mitchell ====
- Bring It Home to Me (Blue Note, 1966)

==== With Red Mitchell ====
- Presenting Red Mitchell (Contemporary, 1957)

==== With Hank Mobley ====
- The Turnaround (Blue Note, 1965)
- Dippin' (Blue Note, 1965)
- A Caddy for Daddy (Blue Note, 1965)
- A Slice of the Top (Blue Note, 1966 [1979])
- Hi Voltage (Blue Note, 1967)
- Third Season (Blue Note, 1967)
- Far Away Lands (Blue Note, 1967)
- Reach Out! (Blue Note, 1968)
- Breakthrough! (Muse, 1972) with Cedar Walton
- Straight No Filter (Blue Note, 1964-66 [1980])

==== With Thelonious Monk ====
- Thelonious Monk at the Blackhawk (Riverside, 1960)

==== With Buddy Montgomery ====
- Ties of Love (Landmark, 1987)

With Tete Montoliu

- Secret Love (Timeless, 1977)
- Live at the Keystone Corner (Timeless, 1979 [1981])

==== With Frank Morgan ====
- Easy Living (Contemporary, 1985)
- Lament (Contemporary, 1986)
- Bebop Lives! (Contemporary, 1987)
- Love, Lost & Found (Telarc, 1995)

==== With Lee Morgan ====
- The Sidewinder (Blue Note, 1963)
- Search for the New Land (Blue Note, 1964)
- The Rumproller (Blue Note, 1965)
- The Gigolo (Blue Note, 1965)
- Cornbread (Blue Note, 1965)
- Infinity (Blue Note, 1965 [1980])
- Delightfulee (Blue Note, 1966)
- Charisma (Blue Note, 1966)
- The Rajah (Blue Note, 1966 [1984])
- Sonic Boom (Blue Note, 1967 [1979])
- The Sixth Sense (Blue Note, 1967–68)
- The Procrastinator (Blue Note, 1967 [1978])
- Taru (Blue Note, 1968 [1980])
- Caramba! (Blue Note, 1968)

==== With Bheki Mseleku ====
- Star Seeding (Polygram Records, 1995)

==== With David Murray ====
- Live at Sweet Basil Volume 1 (Black Saint, 1984)
- Live at Sweet Basil Volume 2 (Black Saint, 1984)

==== With Horace Parlan ====
- Happy Frame of Mind (Blue Note, 1963)

==== With Niels-Henning Ørsted Pedersen ====
- Jaywalkin' (SteepleChase, 1975)
- Double Bass (SteepleChase, 1976) with Sam Jones

==== With Art Pepper ====
- So in Love (Artists House, 1979)
- Artworks (Galaxy, 1979 [1984])
- Landscape (Galaxy, 1979)
- Besame Mucho (JVC, 1979 [1981])
- Straight Life (Galaxy, 1979)
- Art 'n' Zoot (Pablo, 1981 [1995]) with Zoot Sims

==== With Dave Pike ====
- It's Time for Dave Pike (Riverside, 1961)
- Pike's Groove (Criss Cross Jazz, 1986) with Cedar Walton

==== With Jimmy Raney ====
- The Influence (Xanadu, 1975)

==== With Sonny Red ====
- Sonny Red (Mainstream, 1971)

==== With Freddie Redd ====
- Live at the Studio Grill (Triloka, 1990)

==== With Joshua Redman ====
- Wish (1993)

==== With Red Rodney ====
- The Red Tornado (Muse, 1975)

==== With Sonny Rollins ====
- Our Man in Jazz (RCA Victor, 1965)
- There Will Never Be Another You (recorded 1965 released 1978)

==== With Charlie Rouse ====
- Bossa Nova Bacchanal (Blue Note, 1965)

==== With Hilton Ruiz ====
- Piano Man (SteepleChase, 1975)

==== With Pharoah Sanders ====
- Rejoice (Theresa, 1981)

==== With Rob Schneiderman ====
- Smooth Sailing (Reservoir, 1990)

==== With John Scofield ====
- Works for Me (Verve, 2001)

==== With Shirley Scott ====
- One for Me (Strata-East, 1974)

==== With Archie Shepp ====
- Attica Blues (Impulse!, 1972)

==== With Sonny Simmons ====
- Rumasuma (Contemporary, 1969)

==== With James Spaulding ====
- James Spaulding Plays the Legacy of Duke Ellington (Storyville, 1977)

==== With Robert Stewart ====
- Judgement (World Stage, 1994 / Red Records, 1997)
- The Movement (Exodus, 2002)

==== With Sonny Stitt ====
- Blues for Duke (Muse, 1975 [1978])

==== With Idrees Sulieman ====
- Now Is the Time (SteepleChase, 1976)

==== With Ira Sullivan ====
- Peace (Galaxy, 1978)
- Multimedia (Galaxy, 1978 [1982])

==== With Sun Ra ====
- Somewhere Else (Rounder, 1988–89)
- Blue Delight (A&M, 1989)

==== With Cecil Taylor ====
- Jumpin' Punkins (Candid, 1961)
- New York City R&B (Candid, 1961)

==== With Lucky Thompson ====
- Goodbye Yesterday (Groove Merchant, 1973)

==== With the Timeless All Stars ====
- It's Timeless (Timeless, 1982)
- Timeless Heart (Timeless, 1983)
- Essence (Delos, 1986)
- Time for the Timeless All Stars (Early Bird, 1990)

==== With Bobby Timmons ====
- Soul Food (Prestige, 1966)
- Got to Get It! (Milestone, 1967)

==== With Charles Tolliver ====
- The New Wave in Jazz (Impulse!, 1965)

==== With Stanley Turrentine ====
- More Than a Mood (MusicMasters, 1992)

==== With Mal Waldron ====
- Up Popped the Devil (Enja, 1973)
- Like Old Times (RCA Victor, 1976)
- One Entrance, Many Exits (Palo Alto, 1982)

==== With Cedar Walton ====
- Cedar! (Prestige, 1967)
- Eastern Rebellion (Timeless, 1976) with George Coleman & Sam Jones
- The Pentagon (East Wind, 1976)
- Eastern Rebellion 2 (Timeless, 1977) with Bob Berg & Sam Jones
- First Set (SteepleChase, 1977 [1978])
- Second Set (SteepleChase, 1977 [1979])
- Third Set (SteepleChase, 1977 [1982])
- Eastern Rebellion 3 (Timeless, 1980) with Curtis Fuller, Bob Berg & Sam Jones
- The Maestro (Muse, 1981)
- Among Friends (Theresa, 1982 [1989])
- Eastern Rebellion 4 (Timeless, 1984) with Curtis Fuller, Bob Berg, Alfredo "Chocolate" Armenteros & David Williams
- Cedar's Blues (Red, 1985)
- The Trio 1 (Red, 1985)
- The Trio 2 (Red, 1985)
- The Trio 3 (Red, 1985)
- Cedar Walton (Timeless, 1985)
- Bluesville Time (Criss Cross Jazz, 1985)
- Cedar Walton Plays (Delos, 1986)
- As Long as There's Music (Muse, 1990 [1993])
- Mosaic (Music Masters, 1990 [1992]) as Eastern Rebellion
- Simple Pleasure (Music Masters, 1993) as Eastern Rebellion
- Manhattan Afternoon (Criss Cross Jazz, 1992 [1994])
- Just One of Those Nights: At the Village Vanguard (Music Masters, 1995) as Eastern Rebellion

==== With Don Wilkerson ====
- The Texas Twister (1960)
- Preach Brother! (1962)

==== With David Williams ====
- Up Front (Timeless, 1987)

==== With Jack Wilson ====
- Easterly Winds (Blue Note, 1967)
