= Cedar Walton =

American jazz pianist (1934–2013)

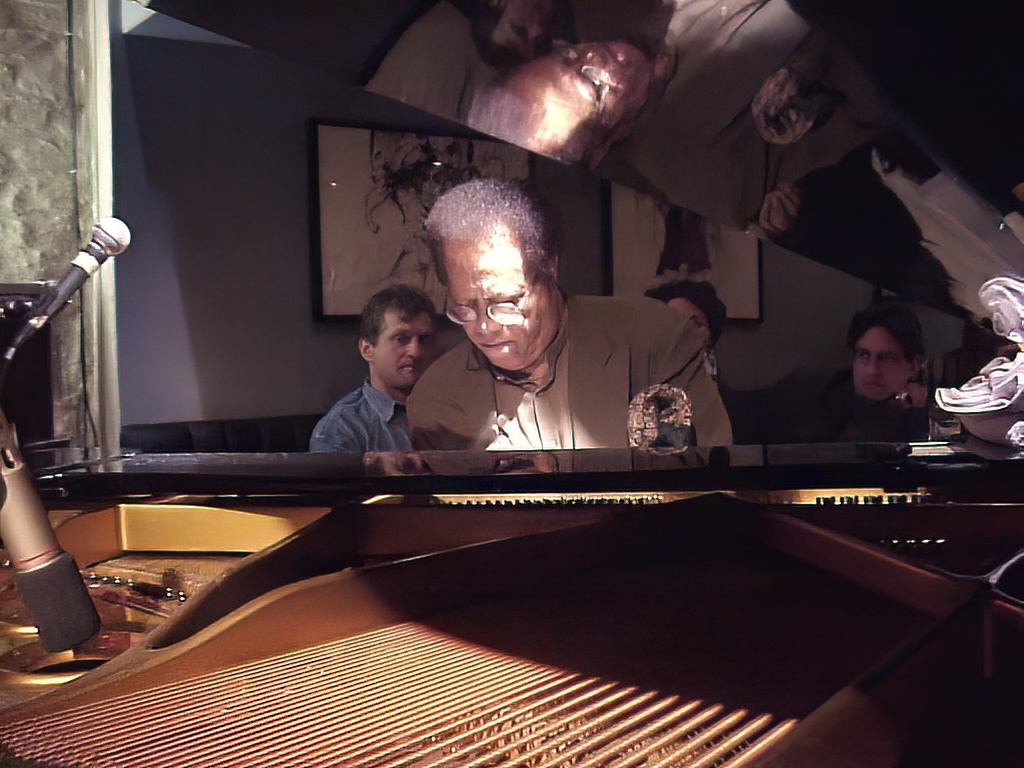
- Walton in 2001

Background information
- Born: January 17, 1934; Dallas, Texas, U.S.
- Died: August 19, 2013 (aged 79) Brooklyn, New York, U.S.
- Genres: Jazz, hard bop
- Occupations: Musician, composer
- Instrument: Piano

Cedar Anthony Walton Jr. (January 17, 1934 – August 19, 2013) was an American hard bop jazz pianist. He came to prominence as a member of drummer Art Blakey's band, The Jazz Messengers, before establishing a long career as a bandleader and composer. Several of his compositions have become jazz standards, including "Mosaic", "Bolivia", "Holy Land", "Mode for Joe" and "Ugetsu/Fantasy in D".

== Early life ==
Walton was born and grew up in Dallas, Texas. His mother Ruth, an aspiring concert pianist, was his first teacher, and took him to jazz performances around Dallas. Walton cited Nat King Cole, Bud Powell, Thelonious Monk and Art Tatum as his major influences on piano. He began emulating these artists' recordings from an early age.

After briefly attending Dillard University in New Orleans, he entered the University of Denver as a composition major, but was encouraged to switch to a music-education program with the goal of a career in the local public school system. This later proved extremely useful, as he learned to play and arrange for various instruments, a talent he honed with Art Blakey's Jazz Messengers.

Walton was tempted by the promise of New York City through his associations with John Coltrane, Charlie Parker, and Richie Powell, whom he met at after-hours sessions around Denver, Colorado. In 1955, he decided to leave school and drove with a friend to New York City. He quickly got recognition from Johnny Garry, who ran Birdland at the time.

== Later life and career ==
Walton was drafted into the U.S. Army and stationed in Germany, cutting short his rising status in the after-hours jazz scene. In the Army he played with musicians Leo Wright, Don Ellis and Eddie Harris. On his discharge after two years, he picked up where he left off, playing as a sideman with Kenny Dorham, on whose 1958 album This Is the Moment!, he made his recording debut. He joined the Jazztet led by Benny Golson and Art Farmer and played with them from 1958 to 1961. In April 1959 he recorded an alternate take of "Giant Steps" with John Coltrane, though he did not solo. In the early 1960s Walton joined Art Blakey's Jazz Messengers as a pianist-arranger (on the same day Freddie Hubbard joined the group), where, for the next three years, he wrote and arranged such originals as "Ugetsu" and "Mosaic".

He left the Messengers in 1964 and by the late 1960s was part of the house rhythm section at Prestige Records. In addition to releasing his own recordings there, he recorded with Sonny Criss, Pat Martino, Eric Kloss, and Charles McPherson. For a year, he was Abbey Lincoln's accompanist, and recorded with Lee Morgan from 1966 to 1968. In the mid-1970s he led the funk group Mobius. He arranged and recorded for Etta James from the mid-1990s on, helping her win a Grammy Award for Best Jazz Vocal Album for Mystery Lady: Songs of Billie Holiday (RCA Victor) in 1994.

Many of Walton's compositions have become jazz standards, including "Firm Roots", "Bolivia" (perhaps his best known), "Holy Land", "Mode for Joe" and "Cedar's Blues". One of his oldest compositions is "Fantasy in D", recorded as "Ugetsu" by Art Blakey in 1963, and as "Polar AC" by Freddie Hubbard, first in 1971.

In January 2010, Walton was inducted as a National Endowment for the Arts Jazz Master.

== Billy Higgins partnership and The Magic Triangle ==
Walton played and recorded with drummer Billy Higgins from the mid-1960s through the 1990s. Higgins and Walton first recorded together in 1965 for Eddie Harris's The In Sound LP, and Higgins played on Walton's first album, Cedar! (1967). They continued to play and record together regularly through the 1970s and 1980s. In the early 1970s, bassist Sam Jones formed a working trio, The Magic Triangle, with Walton and Higgins. They recorded albums under both Walton's and Jones's leadership, and played on several 1970s albums by Art Farmer and Clifford Jordan (including Jordan's Glass Bead Games and Farmer's Art Farmer Quintet at Boomers). Though they did not record as The Magic Triangle, Jordan's albums Clifford Jordan and the Magic Triangle on Stage, Firm Roots, and The Highest Mountain cited the trio's informal name. They also backed up Hank Mobley, Gene Ammons and Sonny Stitt, and Idrees Sulieman in the 1970s on live and studio recordings. Drummer Louis Hayes sometimes replaced Higgins during this period for recordings and live performances.

In 1975, The Magic Triangle became the core of the Eastern Rebellion jazz collective, which featured (at different times) saxophonists George Coleman, Bob Berg and Ralph Moore, trombonist Curtis Fuller, and trumpeter Alfredo "Chocolate" Armenteros. Eastern Rebellion released seven albums between 1975 and 1994, all featuring Walton and Higgins.

Sam Jones died in late 1981, and Walton and Higgins carried on with bassist David "Happy" Williams, who also joined them on the four final Eastern Rebellion recordings. Walton, Williams, and Higgins recorded regularly throughout the 1980s and early 1990s under Walton's leadership. Walton and Higgins also appeared on recordings by Freddie Hubbard, Stanley Turrentine, Slide Hampton, Junior Cook, Bobby Hutcherson, Frank Morgan, and Jackie McLean (sometimes with other bassists in place of Williams).

With bassist Ron Carter, Walton and Higgins recorded two live albums in 1991 at the Sweet Basil Jazz Club as the Sweet Basil Trio. A third Sweet Basil Trio record, this time with Williams on bass, was recorded in 1993.

Writing of The Magic Triangle's collaborations with Clifford Jordan, pianist and essayist Ethan Iverson wrote: "Taken as a collection, the Jordan–Walton canon from the seventies is some of the best jazz ever recorded....If I had to pick only one from that collaboration for a desert isle, it would be Jordan's Night of the Mark VII."

== Death ==
After a brief illness, Walton died on August 19, 2013, at his home in Brooklyn, New York, at age 79.

== Discography ==
=== As leader/co-leader ===
Year recorded	Title	Label	Year released	Notes
1967	Cedar!	Prestige	1967	
1968	Spectrum	Prestige	1968	
1969	The Electric Boogaloo Song	Prestige	1969	
1969	Soul Cycle	Prestige	1970	
1972	Breakthrough! with Hank Mobley	Cobblestone	1972	
1973	A Night at Boomers, Vol. 1	Muse	1973	live
1973	A Night at Boomers, Vol. 2	Muse	1973	live
1974	Firm Roots	Muse	1976	live
1974	Pit Inn	East Wind	1975	live
1975	Mobius	RCA	1975	
1976	The Pentagon	East Wind	1976	
1976	Beyond Mobius	RCA	1976	
1977	First Set	SteepleChase	1978	live
1977	Second Set	SteepleChase	1979	live
1977	Third Set	SteepleChase	1983	live
1977–1978	Animation	Columbia	1978	
1980	Soundscapes	Columbia	1980	
1980	The Maestro with Abbey Lincoln	Muse	1981	
1981	Piano Solos	Clean Cuts	1981	
1981	Heart & Soul with Ron Carter	Timeless	1982	
1982	Among Friends	Theresa	1989	live
1983	The All American Trio with Ron Carter and Jack DeJohnette	Baystate	1984	
1985	Cedar's Blues	Red	1985	live
1985	The Trio 1	Red	1986	live
1985	The Trio 2	Red	1986	live
1985	Cedar Walton	Timeless	1986	
1985	Bluesville Time	Criss Cross	1986	
1986	The Trio 3	Red	1986	live
1986	Blues for Myself	Red	1986	
1986	Cedar Walton Plays	Delos	1987	
1988	Standards with the VIP Trio	California Breeze	1988	
1988	Standards Vol 2 with the VIP Trio	California Breeze	1988	
1990	Duo with David Williams	Red	1991	also released as Off Minor
1990	As Long as There's Music	Muse	1993	
1992	Cedar Walton at Maybeck	Concord Jazz	1993	live
1992	Manhattan Afternoon	Criss Cross	1994	
1996	Composer	Astor Place	1996	
1997	Roots	Astor Place	1997	
2001	The Promise Land	HighNote	2001	
2002	Latin Tinge	HighNote	2002	
2005	Underground Memoirs	HighNote	2005	
2005	Midnight Waltz	Venus	2005	
2006	One Flight Down	HighNote	2006	
2008	Seasoned Wood	HighNote	2008	
2009	Voices Deep Within	HighNote	2009	
2010?	Cedar Chest	HighNote	2010	
2010	Song of Delilah	Venus	2011	
2011	The Bouncer	HighNote	2011	

Extended content

Posthumous releases

- Reliving The Moment – Live At The Keystone Korner (HighNote, 2014) – live rec. 1977–78
- Charmed Circle (HighNote, 2017) – rec. 1979

As leader of Eastern Rebellion

- 1975: Eastern Rebellion with George Coleman, Sam Jones & Billy Higgins (Timeless, 1976; Impulse, 1988)
- 1977: Eastern Rebellion 2 with Bob Berg, Sam Jones & Billy Higgins (Timeless, 1977)
- 1979: Eastern Rebellion 3 with Curtis Fuller, Bob Berg, Sam Jones & Billy Higgins (Timeless, 1980)
- 1983: Eastern Rebellion 4 with Curtis Fuller, Bob Berg, Alfredo "Chocolate" Armenteros, David Williams & Billy Higgins (Timeless, 1984)
- 1990: Mosaic with Ralph Moore, David Williams & Billy Higgins (MusicMasters, 1992)
- 1992: Simple Pleasure with Ralph Moore, David Williams & Billy Higgins (MusicMasters, 1993)
- 1994: Just One of Those... Nights at the Village Vanguard with Ralph Moore, David Williams & Billy Higgins (MusicMasters, Jazz Heritage, 1994)

=== As a member ===
The Timeless All Stars

- It's Timeless (Timeless, 1982)
- Timeless Heart (Timeless, 1983)
- Essence (Delos, 1986)
- Time for the Timeless All Stars (Early Bird, 1991)

=== As sideman ===
With Gene Ammons and Sonny Stitt

- 1973: God Bless Jug and Sonny (Prestige, 2001)
- 1973: Left Bank Encores (Prestige, 2001)

With Art Blakey

- Mosaic (Blue Note, 1961)
- Three Blind Mice (Blue Note, 1962)
- Caravan (Riverside, 1963)
- Ugetsu (Riverside, 1963)
- Buhaina's Delight (Blue Note, 1963)
- Free for All (Blue Note, 1964)
- Kyoto (Riverside, 1964)
- Indestructible (Blue Note, 1964)
- Golden Boy (Colpix, 1964)
- Buhaina (Prestige, 1973)
- Anthenagin (Prestige, 1973)

With Donald Byrd

- Slow Drag (Blue Note, 1967)
- Blackjack (Blue Note, 1968)

With Sonny Criss

- Up, Up and Away (Prestige, 1967)
- The Beat Goes On! (Prestige, 1968)

With Kenny Dorham

- This Is the Moment! (Riverside, 1958)
- Blue Spring with Cannonball Adderley (Riverside, 1959)

With Art Farmer

- The Time and the Place (Columbia, 1967)
- The Art Farmer Quintet Plays the Great Jazz Hits (Columbia, 1967)
- Homecoming (Mainstream, 1971)
- Yesterday's Thoughts (East Wind, 1975)
- To Duke with Love (East Wind, 1975)
- The Summer Knows (East Wind, 1976)
- Art Farmer Quintet at Boomers (East Wind, 1976)

With Curtis Fuller

- Soul Trombone (Impulse!, 1961)
- Smokin' (Mainstream, 1972)

With Benny Golson

- Take a Number from 1 to 10 (Argo, 1961)
- This Is for You, John (Timeless, 1987) – rec. 1983

With Dexter Gordon

- 1972: Generation (Prestige, 1972)
- 1972: Tangerine (Prestige, 1975)
- 1980: Gotham City (Columbia, 1981)

With Steve Grossman

- Love Is the Thing (Red, 1985)
- A Small Hotel (Dreyfus Jazz, 1993)

With Eddie Harris

- Cool Sax from Hollywood to Broadway (Columbia, 1964)
- The In Sound (Atlantic, 1965)
- Mean Greens (Atlantic, 1966)
- The Tender Storm (Atlantic, 1966)
- Excursions (Atlantic, 1973) – rec. 1966–73
- How Can You Live Like That? (Atlantic, 1976)

With Jimmy Heath

- Jimmy Heath Orchestra, Really Big! (Riverside, 1960)
- The Quota (Riverside, 1961)
- Triple Threat (Riverside, 1962)

With Billy Higgins

- Soweto (Red, 1979)
- Once More (Red, 1980)
- The Soldier (Timeless, 1981) – rec. 1979
- Bridgework (Contemporary, 1987)
- Billy Higgins Quintet (Sweet Basil, 1993)

With Freddie Hubbard

- Hub Cap (Blue Note, 1961)
- The Body & the Soul (Impulse!, 1963)
- Here to Stay (Blue Note, 1979) – rec. 1962
- Bolivia (Musicmasters, 1991)

With Bobby Hutcherson

- Highway One (Columbia, 1978)
- Farewell Keystone (Evidence, 1992) – rec. 1982

With Milt Jackson

- Milt Jackson at the Museum of Modern Art (Limelight, 1965)
- Born Free (Limelight, 1966)
- Milt Jackson and the Hip String Quartet (Verve, 1968)
- Goodbye (CTI, 1973)
- Olinga (CTI, 1974)
- Milt Jackson at the Kosei Nenkin (Pablo, 1976)
- Bags' Bag (Pablo, 1979)
- It Don't Mean a Thing If You Can't Tap Your Foot to It (Pablo, 1984)
- The Harem (Musicmasters, 1991)
- Reverence and Compassion (Warner Bros., 1993)

With Etta James

- Mystery Lady: Songs of Billie Holiday (RCA Victor, 1994)
- Time After Time (RCA Victor, 1995)
- 12 Songs of Christmas (Private Music, 1998)
- Blue Gardenia (Private Music, 2001)

With The Jazztet (Art Farmer and Benny Golson)

- Big City Sounds (Argo, 1960)
- The Jazztet and John Lewis (Argo, 1961)
- The Jazztet at Birdhouse (Argo, 1961)
- Voices All (Eastworld, 1982)

With J. J. Johnson

- Really Livin' (Columbia, 1959)
- J.J. Inc. (Columbia, 1961)

With Philly Joe Jones

- Advance! (Galaxy, 1978)
- Drum Song (Galaxy, 1985) – rec. 1978

With Sam Jones

- Seven Minds (East Wind, 1974)
- Something in Common (Muse, 1977)

With Clifford Jordan

- Spellbound (Riverside, 1960)
- Starting Time (Jazzland, 1961)
- Bearcat (Jazzland, 1962)
- These are My Roots: Clifford Jordan Plays Leadbelly (Atlantic, 1965)
- Glass Bead Games (Strata-East, 1974)
- Night of the Mark VII (Muse, 1975)
- Firm Roots (Steeplechase, 1975)
- The Highest Mountain (Steeplechase, 1975)
- On Stage Vol. 1 (SteepleChase, 1977) – rec. 1975
- On Stage Vol. 2 (SteepleChase, 1978) – rec. 1975
- On Stage Vol. 3 (SteepleChase, 1979) – rec. 1975
- Half Note (SteepleChase, 1985) – rec. 1974

With Kimiko Kasai

- Kimiko Is Here (CBS/Sony, 1974)
- Kimiko Kasai (Kittye, 1990)

With Charles McPherson

- From This Moment On! (Prestige, 1968)
- Horizons (Prestige, 1968)

With Blue Mitchell

- The Cup Bearers (Riverside, 1962)
- Boss Horn (Blue Note, 1966)
- Stratosonic Nuances (RCA, 1975)
- Summer Soft (Impulse!, 1977)

With Frank Morgan

- Easy Living (Contemporary, 1985)
- Lament (Contemporary, 1986)
- Bebop Lives! (Contemporary, 1987)
- Love, Lost & Found (Telarc, 1995)

With Lee Morgan

- Charisma (Blue Note, 1966)
- The Rajah (Blue Note, 1966)
- Sonic Boom (Blue Note, 1967)
- The Sixth Sense (Blue Note, 1968)
- Caramba! (Blue Note, 1968)

With David "Fathead" Newman

- Resurgence! (Muse, 1981)
- Diamondhead (HighNote, 1988)
- Davey Blue (HighNote, 2002)

With Houston Person

- Chocomotive (Prestige, 1967)
- Trust in Me (Prestige, 1967)
- Blue Odyssey (Prestige, 1968)
- Broken Windows, Empty Hallways (Prestige, 1972)
- The Big Horn (Muse, 1979) – rec. 1976
- Very PERSONal (Muse, 1980)
- Naturally (HighNote, 2012)

With Sonny Red

- The Mode (Jazzland, 1961)
- Sonny Red (Mainstream, 1971)

With Archie Shepp

- For Losers (Impulse!, 1969)
- Kwanza (Impulse!, 1969)

With Lucky Thompson

- Goodbye Yesterday (Groove Merchant, 1973)
- Concert: Friday the 13th – Cook County Jail (Groove Merchant, 1973)
- I Offer You (Groove Merchant, 1973)

With Stanley Turrentine

- Another Story (Blue Note, 1969)
- More Than a Mood (MusicMasters, 1992)

With others

- Ray Brown, Something for Lester (Contemporary, 1977)
- Kenny Burrell, Sunup to Sundown (Contemporary, 1991)
- Benny Carter, Elegy in Blue (MusicMasters, 1994)
- Joe Chambers, The Almoravid (Muse, 1974)
- Junior Cook, Somethin's Cookin' (Muse, 1981)
- Ornette Coleman, Broken Shadows (Columbia, 1982) – rec. 1972
- Ornette Coleman, The Complete Science Fiction Sessions (Columbia, 2000) – rec. 1972
- Johnny Coles, Katumbo (Dance) (Mainstream, 1971)
- John Coltrane, Giant Steps (Atlantic, 1959) [alternate takes]
- Larry Coryell, Cedars of Avalon (HighNote, 2002)
- Teddy Edwards, It's All Right! (Prestige, 1967)
- Johnny Griffin, Bush Dance (Galaxy, 1978)
- Slide Hampton, Roots (Criss Cross, 1985)
- Joe Henderson, Mode for Joe (Blue Note, 1966)
- Bjorn Johansen, Take One (Odin, 1987)
- Etta Jones, Save Your Love for Me (Muse, 1980)
- Eric Kloss, First Class Kloss! (Prestige, 1967)
- Abbey Lincoln, Abbey Is Blue (Riverside, 1959)
- Pat Martino, Strings! (Prestige, 1967)
- Christian McBride, New York Time (Chesky, 2006)
- Dave Pike, Pike's Groove (Criss Cross Jazz, 1986)
- Ian Shaw, In a New York Minute (Milestone, 1999) – rec. 1998
- Woody Shaw, Setting Standards (Muse, 1984) – rec. 1983
- James Spaulding, James Spaulding Plays the Legacy of Duke Ellington (Storyville, 1977)
- Idrees Sulieman, Now Is the Time (SteepleChase, 1976)
- Sonny Stitt, Just In Case You Forgot How Bad He Really Was (32 Jazz, 1981)
- Jay Thomas, Easy Does It (Discovery, 1985)
- David Williams, Up Front (Timeless, 1987)
- Christopher Hollyday, Christopher Hollyday (BMG, 1989)
- In a New York Minute with Ian Shaw (Milestone, 1999)
- Hank Crawford, Down on the Deuce (Milestone, 1985)
