= The Soul Society =

Studio album by Sam Jones
- Released: 1960
- Recorded: March 8 & 10, 1960; New York City
- Studio: Reeves Sound Studio
- Genre: Jazz
- Length: 40:26
- Label: Riverside; RLP 12-324
- Producer: Orrin Keepnews

Sam Jones chronology
| The Soul Society (1960) | The Chant (1961) |

The Soul Society is the debut album by bassist and cellist Sam Jones featuring performances recorded in early 1960 and originally released on the Riverside label.

== Reception ==
Professional ratings
Review scores
| Source | Rating |
|---|---|
| Allmusic | 4.5/5 stars |
| The Penguin Guide to Jazz Recordings | 3/4 stars |

Scott Yanow of Allmusic says, "all eight selections are memorable on this highly recommended disc".

== Track listing ==
1. "Some Kinda Mean" (Keter Betts) - 5:49
2. "All Members" (Jimmy Heath) - 4:11
3. "The Old Country" (Curtis Lewis, Nat Adderley) - 6:05
4. "Just Friends" (John Klenner, Sam M. Lewis) - 4:13
5. "Home" (Cannonball Adderley) - 5:13
6. "Deep Blue Cello" (Sam Jones) - 4:57
7. "There Is No Greater Love" (Isham Jones, Marty Symes) - 3:41
8. "So Tired" (Bobby Timmons) - 6:17

== Personnel ==
- Sam Jones - bass (tracks 2, 3, 5 & 8), cello (tracks 1, 4, 6 & 7)
- Nat Adderley - cornet (tracks 1, 4, 6 & 7)
- Blue Mitchell - trumpet (tracks 2, 3, 5 & 8)
- Jimmy Heath - tenor saxophone
- Charles Davis - baritone saxophone
- Bobby Timmons - piano
- Keter Betts - bass (tracks 1, 4, 6 & 7)
- Louis Hayes - drums
