= Sonny Red =

American jazz saxophonist and composer

Sylvester Kyner Jr.
- Image of Kyner by Francis Wolff

Background information
- Born: December 17, 1932; Detroit, Michigan, U.S.
- Died: March 20, 1981 (aged 48) Detroit, Michigan, U.S.
- Genres: Jazz
- Occupation: Musician
- Instrument: Alto saxophonist

Sylvester Kyner Jr. (December 17, 1932 – March 20, 1981), known as Sonny Red, was an American jazz alto saxophonist, flutist and composer associated with the hard bop idiom among other styles.

Sonny Red played with Art Blakey, Curtis Fuller, Paul Quinichette, Donald Byrd, Grant Green, Blue Mitchell, Wynton Kelly, Billy Higgins, and Cedar Walton.

== Biography ==
In the late 1940s, when he was still in his teens, Sonny Red began to play professionally in Detroit with Barry Harris. He continued to play with Barry Harris until 1952. He went on to play with Art Blakey in 1954, and in 1957 recorded with Curtis Fuller on three albums.

Sonny Red first came on the greater jazz scene in the late 1950s with Art Pepper on the album Two Altos.

He made two albums as a leader in 1961; both were released by Jazzland Recordings, a subsidiary of Riverside Records. He continued to record in the 1960s, including four albums with Donald Byrd in 1967.

By the 1970s, however, Sonny Red was falling into obscurity. He died in March 1981, at the age of 48.

== Discography ==
=== As leader ===
- 1957: Two Altos (Regent) with Art Pepper
- 1959–60: Out of the Blue (Blue Note)
- 1960: Breezing (Jazzland)
- 1961: A Story Tale (Jazzland) with Clifford Jordan
- 1961: The Mode (Jazzland) with Grant Green and Barry Harris
- 1962: Images (Jazzland) with Grant Green and Barry Harris
- 1971: Sonny Red (Mainstream)

=== As sideman ===
With Donald Byrd

- Mustang! (Blue Note, 1966)
- Blackjack (Blue Note, 1967)
- Slow Drag (Blue Note, 1967)
- The Creeper (Blue Note, 1967)

With Curtis Fuller

- New Trombone (Prestige, 1957)
- Curtis Fuller with Red Garland (New Jazz, 1957)
- Jazz ...It's Magic! (Regent, 1957)

With Bill Hardman

- Saying Something (Savoy, 1961)

With Yusef Lateef

- The Blue Yusef Lateef (Atlantic, 1968)

With Pony Poindexter

- Pony's Express (Epic, 1962)

With Paul Quinichette

- On the Sunny Side (Prestige, 1957)

With Bobby Timmons

- Live at the Connecticut Jazz Party (Early Bird Records, 1964)

With Frank Wess

- Jazz Is Busting Out All Over (Savoy, 1957)
