= Seven Minds =

Studio album by Sam Jones
- Released: 1975
- Recorded: December 21, 1974
- Studio: Victor Studio, Tokyo
- Genre: Jazz
- Length: 41:33
- Label: East Wind Records EW-7010
- Producer: Toshinari Koinuma

Sam Jones chronology
Down Home (1961)	Seven Minds (1975)	Cello Again (1976)

Seven Minds is the fourth studio album by American jazz bassist Sam Jones together with Billy Higgins on drums and Cedar Walton on piano. The album was recorded and initially released in 1975 in Japan via East Wind label. Masaya Katsura Strings Quartet is featured on tracks 2, 4, and 6. Later the album was re-released on CD in 2002 and 2015.

== Reception ==
Professional ratings
Review scores
Source	Rating
AllMusic	4/5 stars

Ken Dryden of Allmusic awarded the album 4 stars and wrote "Sam Jones led quite a few valuable dates as a leader, though this East Wind album, recorded and released in Japan, may be not be at all familiar to his fans. Joined by Cedar Walton and Billy Higgins, Jones offers three originals, starting with a choice interpretation of the smoking 'Blues for Amos.' His intense 'Seven Minds' (which suggests the influence of John Coltrane) borders on avant-garde and the delightful ballad 'Miss Morgan' features a formidable opening solo by the leader. The pianist contributed 'Holy Land,' a somewhat gospel-flavored work that adds the Masaya Katsura String Quartet".

== Track listing ==
No.	Title	Writer(s)	Length
1.	"Blues for Amos"	Jones	4:49
2.	"Holy Land"	Walton	6:18
3.	"Seven Minds"	Jones	11:55
4.	"I Didn't Know What Time It Was"	Lorenz Hart, Richard Rodgers	6:47
5.	"Miss Morgan"	Jones	5:25
6.	"Le Maestro"	Walton	6:19
Total length:			41:33

== Personnel ==
- Sam Jones – bass
- Billy Higgins – drums
- Cedar Walton – piano
- Masaya Katsura Strings Quartet (tracks 2, 4, and 6)
