= Au Privave =

1951 jazz composition by Charlie Parker

"Au Privave" is a bebop jazz standard composed by Charlie Parker in 1951. Parker recorded "Au Privave" on January 17, 1951, for the American record label Verve. The origin of the title is unknown ("Privave" is not a French word), though Parker is known to have played with words when naming his compositions. A variant of this title is "Après Vous" (After You), a song recorded by drummer Max Roach.

First eight measures of Au Privave

== See also ==
- List of post-1950 jazz standards
