= Red Records =

Italian jazz record company and label

- Founded: 1976
- Founder: Alberto Alberti, Sergio Veschi
- Genre: Jazz
- Country of origin: Italy
- Location: Milan
- Official website: redrecords.it

Red Records is an Italian jazz record company and label founded in 1976 by Sergio Veschi and Alberto Alberti. C. M. Bailey called it the Blue Note of Europe.

In the 1980s its catalogue included Italian jazz musicians such as Franco D'Andrea, Giovanni Tommaso, Gianluigi Trovesi, and Massimo Urbani. Starting in the late 1980s it grew to include Americans such as Robert Stewart, Jerry Bergonzi, Joe Henderson, Billy Higgins, Victor Lewis, Steve Nelson, Cedar Walton, Bobby Watson, and Phil Woods.
