= All Over the Place (Mike Stern album) =

Studio album by Mike Stern
- Released: June 19, 2012
- Recorded: May 2011
- Studio: EastWest Studios (Hollywood, California); Avatar Studios (New York City, New York); Bonayuma Recording Studio (Brooklyn, New York); Ian London Productions (East Islip, New York); Carriage House Studios (Stamford, Connecticut)
- Genre: Jazz, jazz fusion
- Length: 75:22
- Label: Heads Up International
- Producer: Jim Beard

Mike Stern chronology
Big Neighborhood (2009)	All Over the Place (2012)	Eclectic (2014)

All Over the Place is the fifteenth studio album by American jazz guitarist Mike Stern, released on June 19, 2012, through Heads Up International.

== Track listing ==
All tracks are written by Mike Stern.

No.	Title	Length
1.	"AJ"	8:53
2.	"Cameroon"	5:46
3.	"Out of the Blue"	6:15
4.	"As Far as We Know"	6:33
5.	"Blues for Al"	7:06
6.	"OCD"	8:07
7.	"You Never Told Me"	6:18
8.	"Half Way Home"	6:28
9.	"Light"	6:14
10.	"Flipside"	7:22
11.	"All Over the Place"	6:20
Total length:		75:22

== Personnel ==
Credits adapted from AllMusic.

- Mike Stern – guitars (1–3, 5–6, 8–11), acoustic nylon-string guitar (4, 7), slide guitar (8)
- Jim Beard – Rhodes electric piano (1), synthesizers (1, 4, 7), acoustic piano (2–11), Hammond B3 organ (2–3, 8–10)
- Leni Stern – rhythm wah wah guitar (1), ngoni (3)
- Richard Bona – bass (2, 9), vocals (2, 9)
- Dave Holland – acoustic bass (5–7)
- Keith Carlock – drums (1, 10–11)
- Dave Weckl – drums (2, 9)
- Lionel Cordew – drums (4, 8)
- Al Foster – drums (5–7)
- Tim Keiper – percussion (1–3, 9)
- Bob Franceschini – saxophone (2, 9)
- Kenny Garrett – saxophone (5–6)
- Bob Malach – saxophone (10–11)
- Anthony Jackson – contrabass guitar (1)
- Chris Potter – saxophone (1)
- Randy Brecker – trumpet (3)
- Tom Kennedy – bass (3)
- Kimberly Thompson – drums (3)
- Esperanza Spalding – acoustic bass (4), vocals (4)
- Victor Wooten – bass (8)
- Victor Bailey – bass (10)
- Will Lee – bass (11)

Production

- Jim Beard – producer, engineer, mixing
- Phil Magnotti – recording, mixing
- Dennis Moody – recording
- Richard Bona – engineer
- Ken Wallace – engineer
- Max Harper – assistant engineer
- Bob Mallory – assistant engineer
- Jeremy Miller – assistant engineer
- Aki Nishimura – assistant engineer
- Greg Calbi – mastering at Sterling Sound (New York, NY)
- Sandrine Lee – cover design, photography

== Charts ==
Chart (2013)	Peak position
Dutch Albums (Album Top 100)	85
US Heatseekers Albums (Billboard)	39
US Top Jazz Albums (Billboard)	13
