= Who Let the Cats Out? =

Studio album by Mike Stern
- Released: August 15, 2006
- Recorded: January 2006
- Studio: Avatar Studios and B & C Studios (New York City, New York); Carriage House Studios (Stamford, Connecticut)
- Genre: Jazz
- Length: 73:21
- Label: Heads Up International
- Producer: Jim Beard

Mike Stern chronology
These Times (2004)	Who Let the Cats Out? (2006)	Big Neighborhood (2009)

Professional ratings
Review scores
Source	Rating
The Penguin Guide to Jazz Recordings	3/4 stars

Who Let the Cats Out? is an album by Mike Stern, released in 2006 through Heads Up International.

== Rating ==
The album reached a peak position of number fourteen on Billboard's Top Jazz Albums chart.

== Track listing ==
All tracks are written by Mike Stern.

No.	Title	Length
1.	"Tumble Home"	8:14
2.	"KT"	7:57
3.	"Good Question"	4:17
4.	"Language"	7:03
5.	"We're with You"	5:48
6.	"Leni Goes Shopping"	4:38
7.	"Roll with It"	5:02
8.	"Texas"	7:04
9.	"Who Let the Cats Out?"	7:44
10.	"All You Need"	6:57
11.	"Blue Runway"	8:37
Total length:		73:21

== Personnel ==
- Mike Stern – guitars (1–4, 6–11), acoustic guitar (5)
- Jim Beard – acoustic piano (1, 4–6, 9–11), organ (1–4, 7, 8, 10), synthesizers (2, 5, 6, 11), clavinet (7)
- Chris Minh Doky – acoustic bass (1, 6)
- Meshell Ndegeocello – bass (2, 8, 9)
- Richard Bona – bass (3–5, 10), vocals (3, 4, 10)
- Victor Wooten – bass (7)
- Anthony Jackson – bass (11)
- Kimberly Thompson – drums (1, 2, 4, 6, 7, 9, 10)
- Dave Weckl – drums (3, 5, 8, 11)
- Bob Franceschini – saxophone (1–4, 9–11)
- Bob Malach – saxophone (7)
- Roy Hargrove – trumpet (2, 9)
- Gregoire Maret – harmonica (5, 8)

=== Production ===
- Dave Love – executive producer
- Jim Beard – producer, engineer, mixing
- Phil Magnotti – engineer, mixing
- Russell Hoppe – assistant engineer
- Eddie Jackson – assistant engineer
- Greg Calbi – mastering at Sterling Sound (New York, NY)
- Robert Hoffman – art direction, design
- Clay Patrick McBride – cover photography, tray card image
- Gene Martin – session images
- Paul Greco – photo of Victor Wooten
- Robin Tomchin – management
- Roy Holland – management
- Bill Milkowski – liner notes
