= Eleven (Jeff Lorber and Mike Stern album) =

Studio album by Jeff Lorber Fusion and Mike Stern
- Released: September 27, 2019
- Studios: JHL Sound (Pacific Palisades, California); Mannerism Studio (New York City, New York)
- Genres: Jazz, contemporary jazz
- Length: 53:54
- Label: Concord Jazz
- Producers: Jeff Lorber; Jimmy Haslip

Jeff Lorber chronology
Impact (2018)	Eleven (2019)

Mike Stern chronology
Trip (2017)	Eleven (2019)	Space-Time (2021)

Eleven is a collaboration album by the Jeff Lorber Fusion and Mike Stern, released on September 27, 2019. The album was produced by both Lorber and Jimmy Haslip.

== Background ==
Stern and Lorber first crossed paths in the early 1980s when Jeff Lorber Fusion opened for Miles Davis's band, which then featured Stern on guitar. The collaborative effort was initiated by Haslip, who also contributed bass and production work to the album. Haslip had previously collaborated with Stern on various projects, including on a Yellowjackets album.

On the collaboration with Lorber, Stern said that the opportunity to work with him presented an opportunity to work with someone with a different musical background.

It's really a challenge to work with a guy at that level who is playing a style that’s a little different than mine, but one that I definitely enjoy listening to and I appreciate. And so, I’m just glad to have that chance to kind of be tested in that way and see what I can do to hang in there and contribute and make great music with one of my colleagues who I really respect. I enjoy his musicality so much.

— Mike Stern

== Recording ==
Certain songs on Eleven, including "Ha Ha Hotel" and "Tell Me", predate the album by over a decade; the former first appeared on Stern's Is What It Is album in 1994 and the latter was included on Between the Lines in 1996. With the exception of "Nu Som", all of Stern's songs had been recorded before in some capacity. "Nu Som" was written for Will Lee's wife, Sandra, and also features Leni Stern on an African string instrument known as a ngoni. Stern had some new songs in various stages, but opted not to include them on the album due to time constraints. Stern's compositions were recorded with the configuration of himself, Lorber, Haslip, and Dave Weckl. Lorber wrote his compositions beginning with chord sequences and melodic ideas, citing "Righteous" as one example. "Motor City" was written by Lorber 15 years prior to its eventual release on Eleven and features the use of a Yamaha DX7 synthesizer.

Stern used a Yamaha Tele-style signature model guitar and Roland Blues Cube amplifiers during the recording sessions for Eleven. Lorber granted Stern flexibility in approaching the album's guitar solos, with the former commenting that his "melodies were all written out, but Mike was completely free to play anything he wanted for solos, and I loved everything he played". Stern mentioned that he improvised the guitar solos and aimed for a "spontaneous" and "impulsive" approach to these parts. All of Stern's material was recorded first, after which Stern spent a few days adding guitar parts to some pre-recorded tracks prepared by Lorber.

Stern recalled that the suggestion to name the album Eleven was made in the recording studio; Lorber said that the name alluded to the up to eleven phrase from This is Spinal Tap. The duo originally intended to include eleven songs on the record to reflect the title of the album, but they decided to cut the title track from the final release as it "did not make the grade". The title track was instead included as a Japanese bonus track.

== Release and reception ==
Professional ratings
Review scores
Source	Rating
AllMusic	4/5 stars
DownBeat	3.5/5 stars

To promote the album, a European tour was announced for November 2019. In the press release for Eleven, Stern expressed interest in covering some Jimi Hendrix songs for some live performances, including "Red House", which he had also included on his Eclectic album with Eric Johnson.

The album debuted and peaked at number four on the Billboard Jazz Albums chart and spent a total of five weeks in the top 25.

Matt Collar of AllMusic thought that both Lorber and Stern "adapted their distinctive styles for each tune, further calling Eleven "an inspired match-up that lives up to the work of both Lorber and Stern's expansive careers." Carlo Wolff of DownBeat said that Eleven was both an "unpredictable and entertaining" listen, but believed that the album could have benefited from more focus.

== Track listing ==
No.	Title	Writer(s)	Length
1.	"Righteous"	Jeff Lorber	3:59
2.	"Nu Som"	Mike Stern	5:28
3.	"Jones Street"	Stern	7:28
4.	"Motor City"	Lorber	4:04
5.	"Big Town"	Lorber, Jimmy Haslip	5:05
6.	"Slow Change"	Stern	8:38
7.	"Tell Me"	Stern	5:27
8.	"Ha Ha Hotel"	Stern	5:12
9.	"Rhumba Pagan"	Edgar Pagan, Lorber, Haslip	4:09
10.	"Runner"	Lorber	4:24

== Personnel ==
- Jeff Lorber – keyboards, guitars (1, 4, 5, 9, 10), bass (1, 4, 5, 10), synth bass (9)
- Mike Stern – guitars (2–10), vocals (9)
- Leni Stern – ngoni (2)
- Jimmy Haslip – bass (1–3, 6, 8, 9)
- Vinnie Colaiuta – drums (1, 9)
- Gary Novak – drums (1, 4, 5, 7, 10)
- Dave Weckl – drums (2, 3, 6, 8)
- Dave Mann – horns (1, 4, 5, 8–10), horn arrangements (1, 4, 5, 8–10)
- Bob Franceschini – saxophone (8)
- Chelsea Maull – vocals (9)

=== Production ===
- Jimmy Haslip – producer
- Jeff Lorber – producer, engineer, recording
- Peter Mokran – mixing
- Dave Mann – horn recording (1, 4, 5, 8–10)
- Glen Ianaro – additional engineer
- Gavin Lurssen – mastering at Lurssen Mastering (Hollywood, California)
- Raj Naik – photography
- Raffi Minasian – cover concept
- Jimmy Hole – package design

== Charts ==
Chart (2019)	Peak position
US Jazz Albums (Billboard)	4

== Bibliography ==
- Mike Stern and Jeff Lorber. Inside Musicast. September 27, 2019.
