= Voices (Mike Stern album) =

Studio album by Mike Stern
- Released: September 4, 2001
- Studio: Sound On Sound and B & C Studios (New York City, New York)
- Genre: Jazz, world music
- Length: 58:43
- Label: Atlantic
- Producer: Jim Beard

Mike Stern chronology
Play (1999)	Voices (2001)	These Times (2004)

Professional ratings
Review scores
Source	Rating
The Penguin Guide to Jazz Recordings	3/4 stars

Voices is an album by Mike Stern, released in 2001 through Atlantic Records. The album reached a peak position of number twenty-three on Billboard's Top Jazz Albums chart.

== Track listing ==
All tracks are written by Mike Stern.

No.	Title	Length
1.	"One World"	6:25
2.	"The River (Tongo)"	6:29
3.	"Slow Change"	7:15
4.	"Wishing Well"	6:12
5.	"Still There"	7:33
6.	"Spirit"	6:38
7.	"What Might Have Been"	5:33
8.	"Leni's Smile"	5:33
9.	"Way Out East"	7:05
Total length:		58:43

== Personnel ==
Credits adapted from AllMusic.

- Mike Stern – guitars (1–4, 6–9), nylon guitar (5)
- Jim Beard – keyboards
- Jon Herington – acoustic 12-string guitar (4), rhythm guitar (6)
- Richard Bona – bass (1, 2, 8, 9), kalimba (1), vocals (1, 2)
- Lincoln Goines – bass (3, 5, 6)
- Chris Minh Doky – acoustic bass (4, 7)
- Vinnie Colaiuta – drums (1, 2, 4, 6, 7, 9)
- Dennis Chambers – drums (3, 5)
- Arto Tuncboyaciyan – percussion (1–4, 6, 8, 9), vocals (9)
- Bob Franceschini – saxophone (3, 5, 6)
- Michael Brecker – saxophone (9)
- Elisabeth Kontomanou – vocals (1, 4, 6–8)
- Philip Hamilton – vocals (4, 6, 8)

=== Production ===
- Jim Beard – producer, additional recording
- James Farber – recording, mixing
- Bart Migal – additional engineer, Pro Tools operator
- Greg Calbi – mastering at Sterling Sound (New York, NY)
- Shayne Ivy – art direction, design
- Ebet Roberts – photography
- Michele Hirsch – management for MHM Management
