= Back Roads (Bob Berg album) =

Studio album by Bob Berg
- Released: 1991
- Studio: Carriage House (Stamford, Connecticut); RPM (New York City, New York)
- Genre: Jazz, jazz fusion
- Length: 44:58
- Label: Denon
- Producer: Jim Beard

Bob Berg chronology
In the Shadows (1990)	Back Roads (1991)	Virtual Reality (1992)

Back Roads is an album by the American saxophonist Bob Berg, released in 1991. It peaked at No. 8 on Billboard's Jazz Albums chart. The album was nominated for a Grammy Award for "Best Contemporary Jazz Performance".

== Production ==
The album was produced by Jim Beard, who also contributed on keyboards. Its title was inspired by Berg's travels around his East End home. Berg was backed by Mike Stern on guitar, Dennis Chambers on drums, and Lincoln Goines on bass. Berg decided to focus less on technique and fast tempos, instead concentrating on the tunefulness of his playing. Some of the tracks were influenced by the music of Steely Dan.

== Critical reception ==
Professional ratings
Review scores
Source	Rating
AllMusic	4/5 stars
Boston Herald	C+
DownBeat	4/5 stars
The Encyclopedia of Popular Music	3/5 stars
MusicHound Jazz: The Essential Album Guide	3.5/5 stars
The Penguin Guide to Jazz on CD, LP & Cassette	2.5/4 stars

The Boston Herald called the album a "calculated crossover affair", stating that "it features the breezy blowing and bright melodies favored by fans of the Quiet Storm radio format." The Philadelphia Daily News said that the musicians "function in the vein of the ECM label's most accessible, tuneful sessions fronted by Keith Jarrett and Pat Metheny." The Globe and Mail stated that "most of Back Roads is lighter, softer and indeed more produced than has been Berg's fashion... Chambers firms up a couple of pieces, but the rest comes perilously close to the pop-jazz of someone like Grover Washington". The Chicago Tribune noted that Berg "can sound as lite as they come one minute and like Michael Brecker the next." The Toronto Star opined that most of the tracks "are classy but typical synthesizer-inspired fusion exercises, jazz-tinged energetic rock at best and modish musing at worst".

== Track listing ==
All tracks are written by Bob Berg, except where noted.

No.	Title	Writer(s)	Length
1.	"Back Roads"		5:31
2.	"Travellin' Man"		6:02
3.	"Silverado"		8:08
4.	"When I Fall in Love"	Richard Hayman, Victor Young	4:10
5.	"American Gothic"		5:12
6.	"Dreamer"	Mike Stern	7:19
7.	"Nighthawks"		8:06

== Personnel ==
- Bob Berg – saxophones
- Jim Beard – acoustic piano, synthesizers, Hammond organ, arrangements (4)
- Mike Stern – guitars
- Lincoln Goines – bass
- Dennis Chambers – drums (1–4, 6, 7)
- Ben Perowsky – drums (5)
- Manolo Badrena – percussion

Production

- Christine Martin – executive producer, production coordinator
- Kozo Watanabe – A&R
- Jim Beard – producer
- Phil Magnotti – recording, mixing
- Kate Braudy – assistant engineer
- Suzanne Dyer – assistant engineer
- Matt Lane – assistant engineer
- Bob Blank – digital sequencing
- Hiroyuki Hosaka – mastering
- Paul D'Innocenzo – cover art, photography
