= These Times (Mike Stern album) =

Studio album by Mike Stern
- Released: 2003
- Studio: Carriage House Studios (Stamford, Connecticut); Avatar Studios and B & C Studios (New York City, New York)
- Genre: Jazz
- Length: 69:44
- Label: ESC Records
- Producer: Jim Beard

Mike Stern chronology
Voices (2001)	These Times (2003)	Who Let the Cats Out? (2006)

Professional ratings
Review scores
Source	Rating
The Penguin Guide to Jazz Recordings	3/4 stars

These Times is an album by Mike Stern, released in 2003 through ESC Records. The album reached a peak position of number eleven on Billboard's Top Jazz Albums chart.

== Track listing ==
All tracks are written by Mike Stern, except "If Only" where music was written by Mike Stern and lyric by Richard Bona

No.	Title	Length
1.	"Chatter"	6:11
2.	"Silver Lining"	6:37
3.	"I Know You"	5:07
4.	"Mirage"	6:47
5.	"If Only"	5:31
6.	"Street Rhyme"	6:39
7.	"Avenue B"	6:14
8.	"Remember"	6:04
9.	"These Times"	8:14
10.	"What You Believe"	6:47
11.	"Last One Down"	5:33
Total length:		69:44

== Personnel ==
Musicians

- Mike Stern – guitars
- Jim Beard – acoustic piano, synthesizers, organ
- Will Lee – bass (1, 4, 6–7, 9)
- Richard Bona – bass (2–3, 5, 10), percussion (2, 10), vocals (2–3, 5, 10)
- Victor Wooten – bass (8, 11)
- Vinnie Colaiuta – drums (1–7, 9–11)
- Arto Tuncboyaciyan – percussion (1, 4–6, 9)
- Don Alias – percussion (8, 10)
- Kenny Garrett – soprano saxophone (1), alto saxophone (7, 9)
- Bob Franceschini – tenor saxophone (4, 8, 11)
- Elisabeth Kontomanou – vocals (1–2, 4, 6)
- Béla Fleck – banjo (3)
- Bob Malach – tenor saxophone (6)
- Dennis Chambers – drums (8)
- Jon Herington – rhythm guitar (10)

Production

- Joachim Becker – executive producer
- Jim Beard – producer, recording
- Phil Magnotti – recording, mixing
- Aya Takemura – assistant engineer
- Greg Calbi – mastering at Sterling Sound (New York, NY)
- Joachim Oster – design
- George Lange – photography
- David Burrell – management
