= Ben Perowsky =

American musician (born 1966)

- Born: May 12, 1966 (age 60); New York, New York, U.S.
- Genres: Jazz, rock, fusion, funk
- Occupations: Musician, composer, producer
- Instruments: Drum set, percussion
- Website: www.perowsky.com

Ben Perowsky (born May 12, 1966) is an American drummer, percussionist, composer, and music producer. He is the drummer on stage in the 8 TONY award winning Broadway musical Hadestown. Perowsky leads the Ben Perowsky Trio, Moodswing Orchestra and Upstream Trio with Chris Speed and John Medeski. He is a founding member of the electric jazz group Lost Tribe. A prolific sideman, Perowsky has performed with Roy Ayers, John Scofield, The Lounge Lizards, Joan As Police Woman, Elysian Fields, Darryl Jenifer, Uri Caine, Dave Douglas, Mike Stern, Bob Berg, Walter Becker, Steven Bernstein., and John Zorn.

== Early life and education ==
Ben Perowsky was born and raised in NYC to jazz musician Frank Perowsky and modern dancer Ginger Perowsky. His main drum teacher was his father’s Juilliard School classmate, friend and neighbor Bobby Thomas. Ben graduated from The High School of Music and Art in Harlem in 1984 where he played in the jazz band under the direction of Justin DiCiccio. Ben performed with jazz legend Dizzy Gillespie in DiCiccio's tri-state band on the Merv Griffin Show. He attended The Berklee School of Music from 1984 to 1986. While living in Boston he studied privately with drummer Alan Dawson. Perowsky also studied music at Manhattan School of Music and Banff School of Fine Arts.

== Career ==
=== Late 1980s-1990s ===
Towards the end of 1986 Perowsky began work with an array of artists such as James Moody, Rickie Lee Jones, David Liebman and Richie Beirach. He joined Roy Ayers, performing with Ayers and backing artists such as Lonnie Liston Smith and Bobbi Humphrey. His first appearance with Ayers was documented in Live at Ronnie Scott’s. He toured in the Mike Stern Trio from 1990 to 1993 appearing on 4 recordings. He also appeared with and recorded thru the 1990s with Bob Berg, David Kikoski, Jim Beard, Ronnie Cuber, Eliane Elias, Michael Brecker, Dave Douglas, Walter Becker, Jimmy Scott and Mike Mainieri’s Steps Ahead.

At the same time Perowsky became a mainstay on NYC's “downtown scene”, working with artists John Zorn, Marc Ribot, Spanish Fly (Steven Bernstein, Marcus Rojas, David Tronzo), The Fertile Crescent (Erik Sanko, and Danny Blume), Wayne Horvitz, John Cale and Don Byron. He also played percussion in John Lurie's The Lounge Lizards with whom he recorded Queen of All Ears, featured in the HBO series Painting With John.

In 1988 Ben formed Lost Tribe with High School friends Adam Rogers and Fima Ephron. Later adding saxophonist David Binney and guitarist David Gilmore. Upon meeting producer, Steely Dan co-leader Walter Becker in 1991, they were invited to record at Hyperbolic Sound in Maui, Hawaii. Lost Tribe released 3 critically acclaimed records and toured extensively in the U.S. and Europe.

Perowsky joined the songwriters Oren Bloedow and Jennifer Charles new band Elysian Fields in 1995. Between 1995 - 2008 he performed with Elysian Fields on 8 albums, multiple tours and radio appearances.

In the mid-1990s guitarist and producer Danny Blume began a series called Liminal Lounge with DJ Olive, spawning an electronica band called Liminal in which Perowsky played live and recorded with Christian Castagno.

In 1999 he released Ben Perowsky Trio with Chris Speed and Scott Colley. Their recording of Charlie Parker's Segment was used for a pivotal scene in the 2006 film Talladega Nights. The same year he recorded with Mike Stern for his album Play with guests Bill Frisell and John Scofield.

=== 2000s ===
Throughout 2000 Perowsky toured extensively with John Scofield's band. He began touring and recording with pianist Uri Caine’s trio and various ensembles in 2000 up to the present. A record titled Live At The Village Vanguard was released in 2004. Ben also toured with and recorded 3 records with Dave Douglas around this time listed in discography below.

Perowsky established his label El Destructo Records in 2002. El Destructo: Volume I was created through a series billed as "Beatshop" early that winter. "Beatshop" served as the workshop for a sound Perowsky was developing with Glen Patscha and Markus Lyons Miller. It was a blending of slow dub style improv with dark ambience and sparse vocals. El Destructo: Volume II Moodswing Orchestra (2009) expanded on this idea with the addition of four instrumentalists and five vocalists.

In 2002 Ben began playing with songwriter Joan Wasser in duo. Later they were joined by Rainy Orteca on bass forming Joan as Police Woman. An EP was recorded in 2004. Real Life (2006) was met with much success in the US, UK and Europe with extensive touring, TV, radio and festival appearances. Ben also appears in the video for the song "Eternal Flame" and on the records To Survive, Cover and Joanthology.

In 2003, Perowsky produced Bop on Pop for his father Frank with Sam Yahel on organ. Also in 2003, he produced the album Camp Songs for Tzadik. It was voted one of the top 50 CDs of 2003 by JazzTimes magazine. The Ben Perowsky Quartet with Chris Speed, Ted Reichman, and Drew Gress toured in Europe in 2005. Skirl released Esopus Opus in 2009.

Perowsky played drums on the 2008 UK hit single "Blind" by the band Hercules and Love Affair written and sung by Anohni.

=== 2010s-present ===
Ben joined Rufus Wainwright’s band in 2012 for extensive touring in the US, Europe and Australia, releasing the Live from the Artist's Den (2014) and appearing on The David Letterman Show, Conan O’Brien, Ellen DeGeneres, Graham Norton and The Tonight Show.

In 2014 Perowsky produced the Woodstock Jazz Festival with Liz Penta and WDST radio in Woodstock, New York.

Ben produced and played drums on An Afternoon In Gowanus, the Frank Perowsky Big Band debut album, released in 2017.

Between 2005 and 2017 Ben played on 2 releases for Jamie Saft trio and toured in Europe, Japan and South America. Together they play with Darryl Jenifer bassist and founder of Bad Brains’ solo project which debuted in 2017.

In 2016 Ben joined the band for the Off Broadway musical production of Anais Mitchel’s Hadestown. He helped create and define all the drum and percussion parts for the score at the New York Theatre Workshop, further developing the parts for the Broadway production starting in March 2019 at the Walter Kerr Theater. Both productions released cast recordings; the Broadway version winning a 2020 Grammy Award for Best Musical Theater album. At the 73rd Tony Awards, Hadestown received a total of 14 nominations and won eight of them, including Best Musical and Best Original Score. Ben performed with the band and cast on the Tony Awards, Good Morning America, CBS This Morning, Live with Kelly and Michael, Macy’s Thanksgiving Day Parade and NPR’s Tiny Desk.

Perowsky was house drummer for a number of producer Hal Willner productions between 2001 and 2019 including the tribute to Hal himself at Roulette in NYC. Others included Neil Young Tribute, American Standards Gershwin, Freedom Rides, and Edgar Allan Poe backing artists such as Lou Reed, Elvis Costello, James Blood Ulmer, David Johansen, Sting, Rufus Wainwright, Mark Anthony Thompson and Van Dyke Parks.

Ben contracted the jazz quartet for composer Fabrice Lecompte’s recording sessions for the 2020 released motion picture and soundtrack Sylvie’s Love directed and conceived by his elementary school friend Eugene Ashe

Upstream with Chris Speed and John Medeski (recorded in 2014) was released late in 2019 on Ben’s label El Destructo Records.

== Awards and honors ==
Camp Songs selected in JazzTimes Top 50 CD's of 2003

Perowsky/Medeski/Speed's Upstream selected as one of the Top Jazz Albums of 2020 by Jazziz Magazine and Slate.

== Discography ==
=== As leader ===
- Ben Perowsky Trio (Jazz Key, 1999) – rec.1997–1998
- El Destructo Volume 1 with Markus Miller, Glen Patscha (El Destructo, 2002)
- Camp Songs (Tzadik, 2003)
- Moodswing Orchestra (El Destructo, 2009)
- Esopus Opus (Skirl, 2009)
- Upstream (El Destructo, 2020)

Collaboration
With Sam Yahel and Frank Perowsky

- Bop On Pop (JazzKey Music, 2003)

=== As a member ===
Lost Tribe
With David Binney, Adam Rogers, David Gilmore and Fima Ephron

- Lost Tribe (Windham Hill, 1993)
- Soulfish (High Street, 1994)
- Many Lifetimes (Arabesque, 1998)

=== As sideman ===
With Steven Bernstein

- Millennial Territory Orchestra Volume 1 (ADA Global, 2006)
- We Are MTO (Royal Potato Family, 2008)
- MTO plays Sly (Royal Potato Family, 2011)

With Uri Caine

- The Sidewalks of New York: Tin Pan Alley (Winter & Winter, 1999)
- V.A., Great Jewish Music: Sasha Argov (Tzadik, 2003) – omnibus
- John Zorn, Voices in the Wilderness (Tzadik, 2003)[2CD] – omnibus
- Live at the Village Vanguard (Winter & Winter, 2004) – live
- Siren (Winter & Winter, 2011) – live rec. 2010
- Poem of a Cell, Vol. 1: The Song of Songs (Winter & Winter, 2018)

With Ronnie Cuber

- Airplay (SteepleChase, 1992)
- Cubism (Fresh Sound, 1992)
- Live At JazzFest Berlin (SteepleChase, 2013) – live rec. 2008

With Dave Douglas

- Magic Triangle (Arabesque, 1998) – rec. 1997
- V.A., Live at Birdland! (RCA Victor, 1999) – live omnibus
- Leap of Faith (Arabesque, 2000) – rec. 1998

With Elysian Fields

- Elysian Fields EP (Radioactive, 1996)
- Bleed Your Cedar (Radioactive, 1996)
- Clinical Trial (Diluvian, 1997)
- Queen of the Meadow (Jetset, 2000)
- Bend Your Mind EP (The Flower Shop, 2000)
- Dreams That Breath Your Name (PIAS, 2003)
- Last Night on Earth (Vicious Circle, 2011)
- For House Cats and Sea Fans (Vicious Circle, 2014)
- Ghosts of No (Vicious Circle, 2016)

With Joan As Police Woman

- Joan As Policewoman EP (self-released, 2004)
- Real Life (Reveal, 2006)
- To Survive (Reveal, 2008)
- Cover (Reveal, 2009)

With Mike Stern

- Odds or Evens (Atlantic, 1991)
- Standards (Atlantic, 1992)
- Is What It Is (Atlantic, 1994)
- Play (Atlantic, 1999)

With Loudon Wainwright III

- High Wide & Handsome (2009)
- 40 Odd Years (2011)
- Older Than My Old Man Now (2012)

With John Zorn

- John Zorn's Cobra: Live At The Knitting Factory (Knitting Factory Works, 1995) – live rec. 1992
- The Unknown Masada (Tzadik, 2003)
- V.A., The Stone: Issue One (Tzadik, 2005)
- Alhambra Love Songs (Tzadik, 2009) – rec. 2008
- In Search of the Miraculous (Tzadik, 2010) – rec. 2009
- The Goddess: Music for the Ancient of Days (Tzadik, 2010) – rec. 2009

With others

- Roy Ayers, Fast Money (1988)
- Chris Minh Doky, Appreciation (1989)
- Bob Berg, Backroads (1991)
- Jim Beard, Song of the Sun (1991)
- David Kikoski, Persistent Dreams (1992)
- Ralph Bowen, Movin' On (1992)
- Spanish Fly, Rags to Britches (1992)
- The Fertile Crescent, The Fertile Crescent (1992)
- John Cale and Bob Neuwirth, Last Day on Earth (1994)
- Walter Becker, 11 Tracks of Whack (1994)
- Charles & Eddie, Chocolate Milk (1995)
- Rez Abbizi, Third Ear (1995)
- David Tronzo, Yo! Hey! (1996)
- Spanish Fly, Fly by Night (1996)
- John Cale, Walking on Locusts (1996)
- Pat Martino, All Sides Now (1997)
- Robert Dick, Jazz Standards on Mars (1997)
- Hal Wilner, Closed on Account of Rabies: Tales of Edgar Allan Poe (1997)
- Frank London, Debt (1997)
- Liminal, Pre-set (1997)
- The Whistling Hangmen, Barhopping (1998)
- The Lounge Lizards, Queen of All Ears (1998)
- Evan Lurie, How I Spent My Summer Vacation (1998)
- Giora Feidman, Gershwin & The Klezmer (1998)
- Salif Keita, Papa (1999)
- Chris Speed, Iffy (2000)
- Roy Nathanson, Fire at Keaton's Bar & Grill (2000)
- Oren Bloedow and Jennifer Charles, La Mar Enfortuna (2001)
- Joseph Arthur, Redemption's Son (2002)
- Tonic, Live at Tonic (2002)
- Raz Mesinai, Clones and False Prophets (2003)
- Chihiro Yamanaka, Leaning Forward (2003)
- Josh Roseman Unit, Treats for the Nightwalker (2003)
- Kaki King, Legs to Make Us Longer (2004)
- Tom McIntosh, With Malice Toward None (2004)
- Jacob do Bandolim, Great Jewish Music: Jacob do Bandolim (2004)
- Adam Niewood, Introducing Adam Niewood (2004)
- Eyal Maoz, Edom (2005)
- Misha Mengelberg, Senne Sing Sing (2005)
- Jamie Saft, Astaroth: Book of Angels Volume 1 (2005)
- Clem Snide, End of Love (2005)
- Misha Mengelberg, Senne Sing Song (2005)
- Baby Loves Jazz Band, Baby Loves Jazz: Go Baby Go! (2006)
- Ada Rovatti, Airbop (2006)
- Jamie Saft, Trouble (2006)
- Dave Derby, And the Norfolk Downs (2006)
- Trey Anastasio, Bar 17 (2006)
- Adam Levy, Loose Rhymes (2006)
- Patrizia Laquidara, Funambola (2007)
- Nels Andrews, Off Track Betting (2007)
- Hercules and Love Affair, Hercules and Love Affair (DFA, 2008)
- Lizz Wright, The Orchard (2008)
- Susi Hyldgaard, It's Love We Need (2009)
- Jim Keller, Sunshine in My Pocket (2009)
- Arif Mardin, All My Friends Are Here (2010)
- Katell Keineg, At the Mermaid Parade (2010)
- Jazz Passengers, Reunited (2010)
- Marcelo Zarvos, Brooklyn's Finest (2010)
- Iggy Pop, Après (2012)
- 101 Crustaceans, Train Bolt Roller (2012)
- Matt Munisteri, Still Runnin' Round in the Wilderness (2012)
- Trixie Whitley, Fourth Corner (2013)
- Rufus Wainwright, Live from the Artist's Den (2014)
- Anna Calvi, Strange Weather (2014)
- Trixie Whitley, Porta Bohemica (2016)
- Rachael Yamagata, Tightrope Walker (2016)
- Anaïs Mitchell, Why We Build The Wall (Selections from Hadestown). The Myth. The Musical. Live Original Cast Recording (2016)
- Jazz Passengers, Still Life with Trouble (2017)
- Frank Perowsky Big Band, An Afternoon In Gowanus (2017)
- Michael Franks, The Music in My Head (2018)
- Anaïs Mitchell, Original Broadway Cast of Hadestown (2019)
- Fabrice Lecomte, Sylvie's Love (Amazon Original Motion Picture Soundtrack) (2020)

== Film and TV Scores & Soundtracks ==
- A Brother's Kiss (1997)
- Modulations: Cinema for the Ear (Documentary) (1998)
- State and Main (2000)
- The Backyardigans, The Backyardigans (2005)
- The Backyardigans, Groove to the Music (2005)
- Talladega Nights: The Ballad of Ricky Bobby (2006)
- What Just Happened (2008)
- Brooklyn's Finest (2009)
- Altman (Documentary) (2014)
- Sylvie's Love (2020)
