= Play (Mike Stern album) =

Studio album by Mike Stern
- Released: September 14, 1999
- Recorded: December 1998 – January 1999
- Studio: Litho Studios (Seattle Washington); Kampo Studios and Avatar Studios (New York City, New York)
- Genre: Jazz; Rock; Blues
- Length: 62:37
- Label: Atlantic Records
- Producer: Jim Beard

Mike Stern chronology
Give and Take (1997)	Play (1999)	Voices (2001)

Professional ratings
Review scores
Source	Rating
The Penguin Guide to Jazz Recordings	3.5/4 stars

Play is an album by the American jazz guitarist Mike Stern, released in 1999 through Atlantic Records.

The album peaked at No. 21 on Billboard's Traditional Jazz Albums chart.

== Production ==
Bill Frisell and John Scofield contributed to the album. It was tracked live, with few overdubs.

== Critical reception ==
The Times thought that Stern "displays a new maturity—these are properly integrated songs, not simply backdrops for long solos." The Los Angeles Daily News wrote that the album is "highlighted by fine work from Stern and Scofield on the title track's minor blues, the New Orleans-flavored 'Small World' and the bop-driven 'Outta Town'."

== Track listing ==
All songs written by Mike Stern.

1. "Play" - 7:15
2. "Small World" - 5:23
3. "Outta Town" - 6:09
4. "Blue Tone" - 6:43
5. "Tipatina's" - 6:35
6. "All Heart" - 6:22
7. "Frizz" - 5:41
8. "Link" - 6:50
9. "Goin' Under" - 4:10
10. "Big Kids" - 7:29

== Personnel ==
- Mike Stern – guitars
- Jim Beard – keyboards (1–3, 5, 6, 8, 9)
- John Scofield – guitars (1–3)
- Bill Frisell – guitars (4, 6, 7, 10)
- Lincoln Goines – bass
- Ben Perowsky – drums (1–4, 6, 7, 10)
- Dennis Chambers – drums (5, 8, 9)
- Bob Malach – tenor saxophone (3, 5, 6, 8, 9)

=== Production ===
- Yves Beauvais – A&R
- Jim Beard – producer
- Matt Bayles – recording
- Dan Gellert – recording
- Phil Magnotti – recording
- David Fischer – recording assistant
- Matt Gold – recording assistant
- Caleb Lambert – recording assistant
- Greg Thompson – recording assistant
- Joe Ferla – mixing
- Rory Romano – assistant mix engineer
- Andrea Yankovsky – assistant mix engineer
- Greg Calbi – mastering at Sterling Sound (New York, NY)
- Lynn Kowaleski – art direction, design
- Roy Zipstein – photography
- David Burrell – management for Tropix International
