= Don't Try This at Home (Michael Brecker album) =

Studio album by Michael Brecker
- Released: September 5, 1988
- Studios: The Power Station (New York City, New York): Master Studio Astoria (Astoria, New York)
- Genre: Jazz
- Length: 52:39
- Label: Impulse!
- Producer: Don Grolnick

Michael Brecker chronology
| Michael Brecker (1987) | Don't Try This at Home (1988) | Now You See It...Now You Don't (1990) |

Professional ratings
Review scores
| Source | Rating |
|---|---|
| AllMusic | 4.5/5 stars |
| The Penguin Guide to Jazz | 2/4 stars |

Don't Try This at Home is the second album by American jazz saxophonist Michael Brecker, that was released on Impulse! records in 1988. In 1989, the album won a Grammy Award for Best Improvised Jazz Solo.

== Reception ==
AllMusic awarded the album 4.5 stars and its review by Scott Yanow states: "Brecker (on tenor and the EWI) is in superb form, really ripping into the eight pieces (mostly group originals). Recommended."

== Track listing ==
1. "Itsbynne Reel" (Michael Brecker, Don Grolnick) – 7:41
2. "Chime This" (Grolnick) – 7:50
3. "Scriabin" (Vince Mendoza) – 7:47
4. "Suspone" (Mike Stern) – 4:59
5. "Don't Try This at Home" (Brecker, Grolnick) – 9:30
6. "Everything Happens When You're Gone" (Brecker) – 7:11
7. "Talking to Myself" (Grolnick) – 5:10
8. "The Gentleman & Hizcaine" (Jim Beard) – 5:19

== Personnel ==
- Michael Brecker – tenor saxophone, EWI (tracks 1, 4, 5)
- Don Grolnick – acoustic piano (tracks 1, 2, 7)
- Herbie Hancock – acoustic piano (tracks 3, 5)
- Joey Calderazzo – acoustic piano (tracks 4, 6)
- Judd Miller – synthesizer programming (track 5)
- Jim Beard – synthesizers (tracks 7, 8), acoustic piano (track 8)
- Mike Stern – guitars (tracks 1, 2, 4, 5, 7, 8)
- Charlie Haden – acoustic bass (tracks 1–3, 5, 6)
- Jeff Andrews – fretless electric bass (tracks 1, 4, 7, 8), electric bass (tracks 4, 7, 8)
- Jack DeJohnette – drums (tracks 1, 3, 5, 8)
- Adam Nussbaum – drums (tracks 2, 4, 6)
- Peter Erskine – drums (track 7)
- Mark O'Connor – violin (track 1)

=== Technical personnel ===
- Don Grolnick – producer
- Ricky Schultz – executive producer
- James Farber – recording and mixing
- Gary Solomon – assistant engineer (tracks 1–6, 8)
- Karen Robben – assistant engineer (track 7)
- Rhonda Schoen – digital editing
- Greg Calbi – mastering at Sterling Sound, New York City, USA
- Tom Gill – piano technician
- Jerry Wortman – production assistant
- Karen Kramer – production coordinator
- Kathleen Covert – art direction and design
- Mark Seliger – photography
- George Varga – liner notes
