= Jigsaw (Mike Stern album) =

Studio album by Mike Stern
- Released: 1989
- Recorded: February 1989
- Studio: Skyline Studios (New York City, New York)
- Genre: Jazz fusion
- Length: 46:41
- Label: Atlantic
- Producer: Steve Khan; Christine Martin

Mike Stern chronology
Time in Place (1988)	Jigsaw (1989)	Odds or Evens (1991)

Professional ratings
Review scores
Source	Rating
AllMusic	3/5 stars

Jigsaw is the fourth studio album by guitarist Mike Stern, released in 1989 through Atlantic Records and reissued on July 17, 2007, through Wounded Bird Records. The album reached #12 on Billboard's Top Contemporary Jazz Albums chart in 1989.

== Track listing ==
All tracks are written by Mike Stern.

No.	Title	Length
1.	"Another Way Around"	6:25
2.	"Loose Ends"	6:11
3.	"To Let You Know"	6:30
4.	"Jigsaw"	7:06
5.	"Chief" (bonus track on CD edition only)	7:45
6.	"Rhyme or Reason"	5:46
7.	"Kwirk"	6:58
Total length:		46:41

== Personnel ==
- Mike Stern – guitars
- Jim Beard – keyboards, synthesizer orchestrations
- Jeff Andrews – electric bass, fretless bass
- Peter Erskine – drums (1, 3, 6, 7)
- Dennis Chambers – drums (2, 4, 5)
- Manolo Badrena – shekere (1), bongos (5)
- Bob Berg – tenor saxophone
- Michael Brecker – Akai EWI (5)

=== Production ===
- Steve Khan – producer
- Christine Martin – associate producer
- Malcolm Pollack – engineer
- Paul Angelli – assistant engineer
- Patrick Dillett – assistant engineer
- UE Nastasi – assistant engineer
- Greg Calbi – mastering at Sterling Sound (New York, NY)
- Bob Defrin – art direction
- Robert Manella – photography
- Phil Heffernan – digital illustration

== Charts ==
Year	Chart	Position
1989	Billboard Top Contemporary Jazz Albums	12
