= Odds or Evens =

Studio album by Mike Stern
- Released: September 3, 1991
- Studio: RPM Studios (New York City, New York); Carriage House Studios (Stamford, Connecticut)
- Genre: Jazz
- Length: 53:13
- Label: Atlantic
- Producer: Jim Beard

Mike Stern chronology
Jigsaw (1989)	Odds or Evens (1991)	Standards and Other Songs (1992)

Professional ratings
Review scores
Source	Rating
Allmusic	4/5 stars

Odds or Evens is an album by Mike Stern, released in 1991 through Atlantic Records. The album reached a peak position of number eight on Billboard's Top Contemporary Jazz Albums chart.

== Track listing ==
All tracks are written by Mike Stern.

No.	Title	Length
1.	"Keys"	7:28
2.	"D.C."	7:40
3.	"Common Ground"	6:05
4.	"Odds or Evens"	7:08
5.	"Seven Thirty"	6:26
6.	"If You Say So"	7:36
7.	"Sandbox"	3:59
8.	"Walkie Talkie"	6;57
Total length:		53:13

== Personnel ==
- Mike Stern – guitars
- Jim Beard – acoustic piano, synthesizers
- Lincoln Goines – bass (1, 3, 5, 8)
- Anthony Jackson – bass (2, 4, 6)
- Ben Perowsky – drums (1, 5, 8)
- Dennis Chambers – drums (2–4, 6)
- Don Alias – percussion
- Bob Berg – saxophones

=== Production ===
- Christine Martin – executive producer
- Jim Beard – producer
- Phil Magnotti – recording, mixing
- Kate Broudy – assistant engineer
- Mike Krowiak – assistant engineer
- Matt Lane – assistant engineer
- Jeff Lippay – assistant engineer
- Ron Bach – digital sequencing
- Greg Calbi – mastering at Sterling Sound (New York, NY)
- Bob Defrin – art direction
- Thomas Bricker – design
- Roxy Rifkin – photography

== Chart performance ==
Year	Chart	Position
1991	Billboard Top Contemporary Jazz Albums	8
