= Time in Place (Mike Stern album) =

Studio album by Mike Stern
- Released: 1988
- Recorded: December 1987
- Studio: Skyline Studios, New York City
- Genre: Jazz fusion, smooth jazz
- Length: 45:18
- Label: Atlantic
- Producer: Steve Khan; Christine Martin

Mike Stern chronology
Upside Downside (1986)	Time in Place (1988)	Jigsaw (1989)

Professional ratings
Review scores
Source	Rating
AllMusic	4/5 stars

Time in Place is the third studio album by guitarist Mike Stern, released in 1988 through Atlantic Records and reissued on September 18, 2007 through Wounded Bird Records.

== Track listing ==
All music is composed by Mike Stern.

No.	Title	Length
1.	"Gossip"	5:59
2.	"Time in Place"	6:49
3.	"Before You Go"	5:31
4.	"No Notice"	6:39
5.	"After All"	7:35
6.	"Four Shades"	5:04
7.	"Chromazone"	7:41
Total length:		45:18

== Personnel ==
Musicians

- Mike Stern – guitars
- Jim Beard – keyboards
- Don Grolnick – organ (4)
- Jeff Andrews – electric bass, fretless bass
- Peter Erskine – drums
- Don Alias – percussion
- Michael Brecker – tenor saxophone (1, 7)
- Bob Berg – soprano saxophone (2–6), tenor saxophone (2–6)

Production

- Steve Khan – producer
- Christine Martin – associate producer
- Kevin Halpin – recording
- Malcolm Pollack – mixing, additional recording
- Tom Durack – additional recording
- Ed Brooks – assistant engineer
- Dary Sulich – assistant engineer
- Greg Calbi – mastering at Sterling Sound (New York, NY)
- Ebet Roberts – photography
