= Is What It Is =

Studio album by Mike Stern
- Released: March 8, 1994
- Studio: Skyline (New York City); Carriage House (Stamford, Connecticut)
- Genre: Jazz fusion
- Length: 56:34
- Label: Atlantic
- Producer: Jim Beard

Mike Stern chronology
Dedication (1992)	Is What It Is (1994)	Vertical Reality (1994)

Is What It Is is a studio album by Mike Stern, released in 1994 through Atlantic Records.

== Critical reception ==
Professional ratings
Review scores
Source	Rating
Allmusic	4/5 stars

Scott Yanow at AllMusic called the album a "passionate set" and "one of Mike Stern's better recordings."

== Track listing ==
All tracks are written by Mike Stern.

No.	Title	Length
1.	"Swunk"	7:56
2.	"A Little Luck"	6:37
3.	"What I Meant to Say"	6:22
4.	"Showbiz"	5:45
5.	"Believe It"	4:36
6.	"Wherever You Are"	5:35
7.	"Ha Ha Hotel"	6:10
8.	"Signs"	7:49
9.	"Dive"	5:44
Total length:		56:34

== Personnel ==
- Mike Stern – guitars
- Jim Beard – acoustic piano (1, 3, 5, 6, 8), synthesizers (1–4, 6, 8), Hammond organ (5, 7), Wurlitzer electric piano (9)
- Will Lee – bass (1–5, 7–9)
- Harvie S – acoustic bass (6)
- Dennis Chambers – drums (1–5)
- Ben Perowsky – drums (6–9)
- Michael Brecker – saxophone (1, 2, 5)
- Bob Malach – saxophone (7–9)

=== Production ===
- Jim Beard – producer, additional engineer
- Phil Magnotti – recording, mixing
- Tom Bender – assistant engineer
- Rich Lamb – assistant engineer
- Ted Sheets – assistant engineer
- Ron Bach – digital editing
- Greg Calbi – mastering at Sterling Sound Studios (New York City, New York)
- David Burrell – production coordinator, management
- Robin Tomchin – production coordinator, management
- Jean Cronin – art direction, design
- Danny Clinch – photography
- Tropix International – management company
