= Back Roads =

Back Roads may refer to:

- Back Roads (novel), a 2000 novel by the American writer Tawni O'Dell
  - Back Roads (2018 film), a film based on the above novel
- Back Roads (Pat Donohue album), a 2003 album by American guitarist Pat Donohue
- Back Roads (Bob Berg album), a 1991 album by Bob Berg
- Back Roads (1981 film), an American romantic comedy film
- Back Roads (TV series), a 2015 Australian TV series
- Back Roads, an album by Kenny Rogers and the First Edition
- Back Roads, a 2020 novel by Andrée A. Michaud

== See also ==
- Backroad (disambiguation)
