= Time Warp (album) =

Studio album by Chick Corea
- Released: August 29, 1995
- Genre: Post-bop
- Length: 57:13
- Label: GRP Records
- Producer: Chick Corea

Chick Corea chronology
Live in Montreux (1994)	Time Warp (1995)	The Mozart Sessions (1996)

Professional ratings
Review scores
Source	Rating
AllMusic	2.5/5 stars
The Penguin Guide to Jazz Recordings	3.5/4 stars

Time Warp is an album released by Chick Corea in 1995.

== Track listing ==
All tracks by Chick Corea.

1. "One World Over (Prologue)" – 0:51
2. "Time Warp" – 3:11
3. "The Wish" – 7:39
4. "Tenor Cadenza" – 1:46
5. "Terrain" – 6:05
6. "Arndok's Grave" – 4:33
7. "Bass Intro to Discovery" – 3:20
8. "Discovery" – 9:04
9. "Piano Intro to New Life" – 4:07
10. "New Life" – 11:08
11. "One World Over" – 5:29

== Personnel ==
- Chick Corea – piano
- John Patitucci – bass
- Gary Novak – drums
- Bob Berg – saxophones

== Charts ==
Chart (1995)	Peak position
Billboard Top Jazz Albums	17
