= Soundscapes (album) =

Studio album by Cedar Walton
- Released: 1980
- Recorded: 1980
- Studio: A&R Recording Studio, New York City
- Genre: Jazz
- Length: 40:46
- Label: Columbia; JC 36285
- Producer: George Butler, Cedar Walton

Cedar Walton chronology
Eastern Rebellion 3 (1980)	Soundscapes (1980)	The Maestro (1980)

Soundscapes is an album by pianist Cedar Walton recorded in 1980 and released on the Columbia label.

== Track listing ==
All compositions by Cedar Walton except where noted.

1. "Warm to the Touch" (Cedar Walton, S. Brickell) – 7:02
2. "The Early Generation" – 7:58
3. "N.P.S." – 5:10
4. "Latin America" – 6:35
5. "Sixth Avenue" – 7:20
6. "Naturally" (Tony Dumas) – 6:41

== Personnel ==
- Cedar Walton – piano, electric piano, arranger
- Freddie Hubbard – trumpet (track 2)
- Steve Turre – trombone (tracks 1, 2, 4–6)
- Emanuel Boyd – flute (tracks 2–6)
- Bob Berg – tenor saxophone (tracks 1, 2, 4–6)
- Tony Dumas – electric bass
- Al Foster (tracks 1 & 4), Buddy Williams (tracks 2,3,5,6) – drums
- Rubens Bassini, Ray Mantilla – percussion
- Leon Thomas – vocals (track 1)
