= Upside Downside =

Studio album by Mike Stern
- Released: 1986
- Recorded: March–April 1986
- Studio: RPM Sound Studios, New York City
- Genre: Jazz rock
- Length: 35:34
- Label: Atlantic
- Producer: Hiram Bullock

Mike Stern chronology
Neesh (1983)	Upside Downside (1986)	Time in Place (1988)

Professional ratings
Review scores
Source	Rating
About.com	(favorable)
AllMusic	4/5 stars

Upside Downside is the second studio album by guitarist Mike Stern, released in 1986 through Atlantic Records and reissued on August 21, 2007, through Wounded Bird Records.

== Track listing ==
All music is composed by Mike Stern.

No.	Title	Length
1.	"Upside Downside"	5:43
2.	"Little Shoes"	5:33
3.	"Goodbye Again"	6:35
4.	"Mood Swings"	6:05
5.	"After You"	5:28
6.	"Scuffle"	6:10
Total length:		35:34

== Personnel ==
Musicians

- Mike Stern – guitars, arrangements
- Mitchel Forman – acoustic piano (1–3, 5, 6), synthesizers (1–3, 5, 6)
- Mark Egan – bass (1, 3, 5, 6)
- Jeff Andrews – bass (2), co-arrangements (6)
- Jaco Pastorius – bass (4)
- Dave Weckl – drums (1–3, 5, 6)
- Steve Jordan – drums (4)
- Dr. Gibbs – percussion (1–3, 5, 6)
- Bob Berg – tenor saxophone (1, 2, 4–6)
- David Sanborn – alto saxophone (3)

Production

- John Snyder – executive producer
- Hiram Bullock – producer
- Doug Epstein – engineer
- Mike Krowiak – assistant engineer
- Greg Calbi – mastering at Sterling Sound (New York, NY)
- Bob Defrin – art direction
- David Gahr – photography
