= Carl Filipiak =

American jazz fusion guitarist

- Born: September 17, 1950 (age 75); Baltimore, Maryland, U.S.
- Genres: Jazz fusion, rock
- Occupation: Musician
- Instrument: Guitar
- Years active: 1963–present
- Labels: Geometric, Art of Life
- Website: carlfilipiak.com

Carl Filipiak is an American jazz fusion guitarist.

== Career ==
In 1987 Carl Filipiak recorded his first album, Electric Thoughts on his own Geometric Records. Soon after, he started recording and playing with Dennis Chambers, Greg Grainger, and Gary Grainger. In 1990 Blue Entrance was released. He met Bob Berg, who played on Right On Time (1993), Hotel Real (1997), and Peripheral Vision (2000). In the late 1990s he toured with Victor Wooten and Will Calhoun. His music has been featured in the Olympics and on televised events for NBC Sports and Turner Broadcasting. Carl Filipiak and the Jimi Jazz Band's album "What Now" was on the RMR Top 50 Jazz Album Chart for 20 weeks peaking at #2 in 2018. It reached #4 on the NACC Top 30 Jazz Chart and made the Most Added Chart at Jazzweek in 2018.

He is a member of Lafayette Gilchrist and the New Volcanoes and can be heard on It Came From Baltimore, The Go Go Suite, New Urban World Blues, and Deep Dancing Suite. Lafayette's music can be heard on the HBO series The Wire and Treme. In October 2015 he recorded in London at Abbey Road Studios with The Only Road Band on the album Live in Two. Produced by Rob Cass, it features performances by Bernie Marsden from Whitesnake, Dean Ross, Tom and Ernie Lombardo, Eric Scott, John Thomakos, and Chuck Thompson.

Filipiak is the author of Rock-Fusion Improvising, an instructional book and companion CD from Mel Bay Publications.

He has been the opening act for Wynton Marsalis, Roberta Flack, and Eric Johnson.

== Discography ==
- Electric Thoughts (Geometric, 1987)
- Blue Entrance (Geometric, 1990)
- Right on Time (Geometric, 1993)
- Peripheral Vision (Geometric, 1997)
- Hotel Real (Geometric, 1997)
- Looking Forward Looking Back (Geometric, 2002)
- I Got Your Mantra (Art of Life, 2007)
- What Now (2017)

== Bibliography ==
- Rock Fusion Improvising (Mel Bay)
- Guitar: A Complete Guide for the Player (Balafon Books) (contributing author)
- Totally Guitar: The Definitive Guide (Thunder Bay Press) (contributing author)
- Play Acoustic (Backbeat Books) (contributing author)
- Use What You Got (video) (eLine Productions)
