= Cool Nights =

Studio album by Gary Burton
- Released: May 1991
- Studios: Power Station, New York City
- Genre: Jazz fusion
- Length: 58:53
- Label: GRP GRP-9643-2
- Producer: Gary Burton

Gary Burton chronology
| Right Time, Right Place (1990) | Cool Nights (1991) | Six Pack (1992) |

Professional ratings
Review scores
| Source | Rating |
|---|---|
| Allmusic | 3/5 stars |

Cool Nights is a 1991 studio album by American jazz vibraphonist Gary Burton. Burton is featured with tenor saxophonist Bob Berg, guitarist Wolfgang Muthspiel, bassist Will Lee and drummer Peter Erskine.

== Background ==
The album was recorded in the Studio A of the Power Station in New York City. In the accompanying booklet the record label explains that Burton's music in this album changed direction. This time Burton wanted to play something closer to music of such famous jazz names as Nat King Cole, Louis Armstrong, Billie Holiday, Ella Fitzgerald, Sarah Vaughan, and Carmen McRae. Burton's friend Pat Metheny did not play for this album but wrote four of the eleven songs.

== Track listing ==
| No. | Title | Writer(s) | Length |
|---|---|---|---|
| 1. | "Going Home" | Al Forman, Mitchel Forman | 3:44 |
| 2. | "Cool Nights" | Pat Metheny | 4:31 |
| 3. | "With Mallets a Forethought" | Bob James | 6:35 |
| 4. | "Take Another Look" | Pat Metheny | 5:38 |
| 5. | "I Never Left" | Tommy Kamp | 5:08 |
| 6. | "Gorgeous" | Mitchel Forman | 6:35 |
| 7. | "Huba Huba" | Vince Mendoza | 4:34 |
| 8. | "Hopscotch" | Wolfgang Muthspiel | 4:41 |
| 9. | "Artifacts" | Bob James | 6:09 |
| 10. | "The Last to Know" | Pat Metheny | 4:47 |
| 11. | "Farmer's Trust" | Pat Metheny | 6:31 |
| Total length: | | | 58:53 |

== Personnel ==
- Gary Burton – vibraphone
- Will Lee – bass, percussion
- Peter Erskine – drums, percussion
- Wolfgang Muthspiel – guitar
- Bob James – keyboards
- Bob Berg – tenor saxophone
- Roy Hendrickson – recorded and mixed by

== External links and sources ==
- Official website
