= Backroad (disambiguation) =

A backroad is a secondary type of road.

Backroads may refer to:

== Arts, entertainment, and media ==
=== Films ===
- Backroads (1977 film), a 1977 Australian film directed by Phillip Noyce
- Backroads (1997 film), a 1997 Spanish film directed by Emilio Martínez-Lázaro
- Backroads (2000 film), a Canadian film directed by Shirley Cheechoo

=== Music ===
- Backroads, a 2010 EP by English band Lonely the Brave
- Backroads (album), a 1992 album by Ricky Van Shelton
  - Backroads (song), the title track of the above album
- "Backroads", a song by Anaïs Mitchell from Anaïs Mitchell, 2022

== See also ==
- Back Roads (disambiguation)
