= Eastern Rebellion 3 =

Studio album by Eastern Rebellion
- Released: 1980
- Recorded: December 19, 1979
- Studio: Sound Ideas Studio, New York City, NY
- Genre: Jazz
- Length: 41:11
- Label: Timeless; SJP 143
- Producer: Cedar Walton

Eastern Rebellion chronology
| Eastern Rebellion 2 (1979) | Eastern Rebellion 3 (1980) | Eastern Rebellion 4 (1984) |

Cedar Walton chronology
| Animation (1979) | Eastern Rebellion 3 (1980) | Soundscapes (1980) |

Eastern Rebellion 3 is an album by Eastern Rebellion led by pianist Cedar Walton which was recorded in late 1979 and released on the Dutch Timeless label.

== Reception ==
Professional ratings
Review scores
| Source | Rating |
|---|---|
| AllMusic | 3/5 stars |

AllMusic awarded the album 3 stars.

== Track listing ==
All compositions by Cedar Walton except as indicated

1. "Third Street Blues" – 8:00
2. "Never Never Land" (Jule Styne, Betty Comden, Adolph Green) – 6:32
3. "Incognito" – 4:06
4. "Seven Minds" (Sam Jones) – 8:45
5. "Clockwise" – 4:56
6. "Firm Roots" – 7:32

== Personnel ==
- Cedar Walton – piano
- Curtis Fuller – trombone
- Bob Berg – tenor saxophone
- Sam Jones – bass
- Billy Higgins – drums
