= Six Pack (Gary Burton album) =

Studio album by Gary Burton
- Released: 1992
- Recorded: October 10, 1991, April 25, 1992
- Studios: Power Station Studios (NYC); Triad Studios, Seattle, WA, October 10, 1991
- Genre: Jazz fusion
- Length: 1:07:07
- Label: GRP GRP-9685
- Producers: Gary Burton, Pat Metheny, Will Lee

Gary Burton chronology
Cool Nights (1991)	Six Pack (1992)	It's Another Day (1993)

Professional ratings
Review scores
Source	Rating
Allmusic	3/5 stars

Six Pack is a 1992 studio album by American jazz vibraphonist Gary Burton. It features six guest guitarists (B.B. King, Jim Hall, John Scofield, Kurt Rosenwinkel, Ralph Towner and Kevin Eubanks) along with an all-star band including tenor saxophonist Bob Berg, pianist Mulgrew Miller, bassist Steve Swallow and drummer Jack DeJohnette.

== Reception ==
Daniel Gioffre of Allmusic wrote "Gary Burton's peculiar connection and affinity for great guitarists is a proven historical fact, as he has been responsible for bringing such fantastic musicians to the world stage as Larry Coryell and Pat Metheny. On Six Pack, he joins with six different six-stringers for some decidedly varied modern jazz. Kurt Rosenwinkel makes like Metheny on the first track, the up-tempo Mitch Forman composition "Anthem." Any predictability to the song disappears in the presence of the rhythm section of Jack DeJohnette, Steve Swallow, and Mulgrew Miller. One doesn't generally think of the vibes as a blues instrument, and to be fair, it's really not, but Burton gives it the old college try on the title track, where his vibes intersect surprisingly well with Bob Berg's tenor sax and B.B. King's guitar. There is absolutely nothing weighty about this song at all, but it is fun and swinging nevertheless (who says jazz has to be serious all the time?). John Scofield also shows up on the track, and his distinctive tone and phrasing work perfectly in this setting. Other selections include such notables as Jim Hall, Ralph Towner, and Kevin Eubanks, and all of their contributions are solid in their own way. One sometimes wishes that this record was a little less GRP, with Larry Goldings' keyboards and Berg's sax being the most frequent offenders, but there are plenty of hot moments on Six Pack that make this record worth searching out, especially for fans of jazz guitar. Where else will listeners find all of these great players on a single record?"

== Track listing ==
No.	Title	Writer(s)	Length
1.	"Anthem"	Mitchel Forman	5:09
2.	"Six Pack"	Gary Burton	6:18
3.	"Summertime"	George Gershwin, Ira Gershwin, DuBose Heyward	5:40
4.	"Jack's Theme"	Dave Grusin	6:12
5.	"Lost Numbers"	Al Forman	4:26
6.	"Double Guatemala"	Pat Metheny	6:09
7.	"Asphodel"	Dave Clark	6:04
8.	"Redial"	Ralph Towner	3:34
9.	"Invitation"	Bronislaw Kaper	6:50
10.	"My Funny Valentine"	Lorenz Hart, Richard Rodgers	6:07
11.	"Something Special"	Jim Hall	5:42
12.	"Guitarre Picante"	Ralph Towner	4:56
Total length:			1:07:07

== Personnel ==
- Gary Burton – vibraphone
- Steve Swallow – bass guitar (tracks 1, 3–5, 7, 9–11)
- Jack DeJohnette – drums (on all tracks, except 8, 12)
- Bob Berg – tenor saxophone (1–4, 6, 9)
- Mulgrew Miller – piano (1, 3–5, 7, 9–11)
- Larry Goldings – keyboards (1, 3–5, 7, 9)
- John Scofield – guitar (2–4, 6)
- B.B. King – guitar (2, 6)
- Paul Shaffer – piano, organ (2, 6)
- Will Lee – bass guitar, percussion (2, 6)
- Kurt Rosenwinkel – guitar (1, 9)
- Kevin Eubanks – guitar (5)
- Jim Hall – guitar (7, 10, 11)
- Ralph Towner – acoustic guitar (8, 12)

== External links and sources ==
- Official website
