= Give and Take (Mike Stern album) =

Studio album by Mike Stern
- Released: 1997
- Studio: Sear Sound and Sony Music Studios (New York City, New York)
- Genre: Jazz
- Length: 63:23
- Label: Atlantic
- Producer: Gil Goldstein

Mike Stern chronology
Between the Lines (1996)	Give and Take (1997)	Play (1999)

Professional ratings
Review scores
Source	Rating
The Penguin Guide to Jazz Recordings	3.5/4 stars

Give and Take is an album by Mike Stern, released in 1997 through Atlantic Records. The album reached a peak position of number twelve on Billboard's Top Jazz Albums chart.

== Track listing ==
All tracks are written by Mike Stern, except where noted.

No.	Title	Writer(s)	Length
1.	"I Love You"	Cole Porter	6:20
2.	"Hook Up"		7:04
3.	"Everything Changes"		5:40
4.	"One Liners"		8:18
5.	"Jones Street"		7:34
6.	"Lumpy"		3:15
7.	"Rooms"		5:03
8.	"That's What You Think"		6:42
9.	"Giant Steps"	John Coltrane	5:09
10.	"Who Knows?"	Jimi Hendrix	3:04
11.	"Oleo"	Sonny Rollins	5:33
Total length:			63:23

== Personnel ==
Credits adapted from AllMusic.

Musicians

- Mike Stern – guitars
- Gil Goldstein – acoustic piano (6, 7)
- John Patitucci – acoustic bass
- Jack DeJohnette – drums (1–5, 8, 9)
- Don Alias – percussion (6, 7, 10, 11)
- Michael Brecker – tenor saxophone (2, 4, 5)
- David Sanborn – alto saxophone (8)

Production

- Yves Beauvais – A&R
- Gil Goldstein – producer
- James Farber – recording, mixing
- Matthew "Boomer" Lamonica – additional recording
- Andrew Page – assistant engineer
- John R. Reigart III – assistant engineer
- Tom Schick – assistant engineer
- David Swope – assistant engineer
- Greg Calbi – mastering at Masterdisk (New York, NY)
- David Burrell – production coordinator, management
- Robin Tomchin – production coordinator, management
- Lynn Kowalewski – art direction, design
- Norman Jean Roy – photography
