= Lincoln Goines =

American bassist (born 1953)

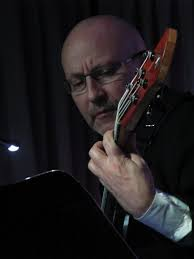
- Goines performing in 2014

Background information
- Born: Oakland, California, U.S.
- Genres: Jazz fusion, jazz, Latin
- Occupation: Musician
- Instruments: Double bass, bass guitar

Lincoln Goines (born 1953) is a double bassist and bass guitarist from Oakland, California.

== Biography ==
A mainstay of the New York City jazz/Latin/studio scene since the early 1980s, Goines' career includes performance credits as sideman to Sonny Rollins, Paquito D'Rivera, Michel Camilo, Mike Stern, and Carly Simon. He is also an educator and author, having written "Funkifying The Clave: Afro-Cuban Grooves for Bass and Drums” with drummer Robby Ameen/Alfred Publishing 1996.

Goines attended high school in Vancouver, British Columbia, Canada where he studied double bass with a former principal bassist of the Vancouver Symphony Orchestra, Sydney Keats. During this period of his development he also had lessons with Eddie Gómez and Gary Karr.

Goines' performance/touring credits include three decades as bassist for Latin jazz flutist and bandleader Dave Valentin, and a 20-year tenure with guitarist Mike Stern.

In 1986, Goines joined the faculty at The Collective in New York City and in 2008 became a professor of Bass at the Berklee College of Music.

== Discography ==
=== As leader ===
- The Art of the Bass Choir (Origin Records, 2022)

=== As co-leader ===
- Kim Plainfield and Lincoln Goines, Night and Day (EFA/Shiosai, 2001)

=== As sideman (selected) ===
With Bob Berg

- In the Shadows (Denon, 1990)
- Back Roads (Denon, 1991)

With Jeff Golub

- Naked City (Bluemoon/Atlantic, 1996)
- Out of the Blue (Bluemoon/Rhino, 1999)
- Grand Central (Narada, 2007)

With Bob Mintzer

- Incredible Journey (DMP, 1985)
- Spectrum (DMP, 1988)
- Urban Contours (DMP, 1989)
- The Art of the Big Band (DMP, 1990)
- Departure (DMP, 1991)
- For the Moment (MCG Jazz, 2012)

With Leni Stern

- Secrets (Enja, 1988)
- Closer to the Light (Enja, 1990)
- Ten Songs (Lipstick, 1992)

With Mike Stern

- Odds or Evens (Atlantic, 1991)
- Play (Atlantic, 1999)
- Big Neighborhood (Heads Up, 2009)

With Dave Valentin

- The Hawk (GRP, 1979)
- Land of the Third Eye (GRP, 1980)
- Mind Time (GRP, 1987)
- Live at the Blue Note (GRP, 1988)
- Two Amigos (GRP, 1990)
- Tropic Heat (GRP, 1993)

With others (selected)

- Idris Muhammad, You Ain't No Friend of Mine (Fantasy, 1978)
- Tania Maria, Come with Me (Concord Jazz, 1982)
- Bob Moses, Visit with the Great Spirit (Gramavision, 1983)
- Dave Grusin, Out of the Shadows (Arista, 1982)
- Dizzy Gillespie, New Faces (GRP, 1984)
- Claudio Roditi, Red On Red CTI Records,1984)
- Paquito D'Rivera, Celebration (Columbia, 1988)
- David Broza, Away from Home (RGB, 1989)
- Scott Cossu, Switchback (Windham Hill, 1989)
- Emily Remler, This Is Me, (1990)
- Marvin Stamm, Bop Boy (Musicmasters, 1991)
- Eliane Elias, A Long Story (Manhattan, 1991)
- Wayne Krantz, Long to Be Loose (Enja, 1993)
- Dave Samuels, Del Sol (GRP, 1993)
- Wayne Krantz, 2 Drink Minimum (Enja, 1995)
- Dar Williams, End of the Summer (1997)
- Michel Camilo, Thru My Eyes (Columbia Records, 1997)
- Ryo Kawasaki, Cosmic Rhythm (1999)
- Bill Connors, Return (2005)
- Carly Simon, This Kind of Love (Hear Music, 2008)
- Bill O'Connell, Jazz Latin (Savant, 2018)
- Robby Ameen, Diluvio (Origin, 2020)
