= Bob Berg =

American jazz saxophonist (1951–2002)

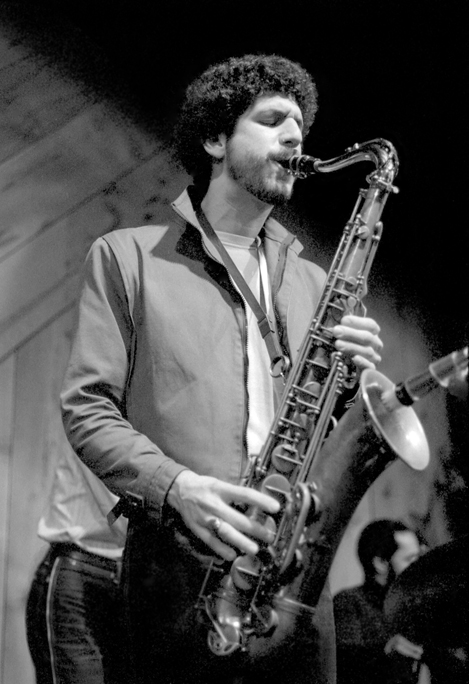
- Berg playing in Cedar Walton's quartet at Bach Dancing & Dynamite Society (The Douglas Beach House), Half Moon Bay, California, November 30, 1980

Background information
- Born: April 7, 1951; Brooklyn, New York, U.S.
- Died: December 5, 2002 (aged 51) Amagansett, New York, U.S.
- Genres: Jazz
- Occupation: Saxophonist
- Formerly of: Miles Davis, Horace Silver, Cedar Walton, Mike Stern, Chick Corea

Robert Berg (April 7, 1951 – December 5, 2002) was an American jazz saxophonist.

== Biography ==
Berg was born in Brooklyn, New York.

Berg started his musical education at the age of six when he began studying classical piano. He began playing the saxophone at the age of thirteen. He studied at the High School of Performing Arts and Juilliard before leaving school to tour. Berg was influenced by the late 1964–1967 period of John Coltrane's music.

A student from the hard bop school, Berg played from 1973 to 1976 with Horace Silver and, from 1977 to 1983, with Cedar Walton. Berg became more widely known when he joined Miles Davis' band in 1984. After leaving Davis's band in 1987, Berg released a series of solo albums and also performed and recorded frequently in a group co-led with guitarist Mike Stern. On these albums he played a more accessible style of music, mixing funk, jazz and even country music, with many other diverse compositional elements to produce albums. He often played at the 7th Avenue South NYC club. He worked with Chick Corea, Steve Gadd and Eddie Gómez in a quartet. Berg's tenor saxophone sound was a synthesis of rhythm and blues players such as Junior Walker and Arnett Cobb with the lyricism, intellectual freedom and soul of Wayne Shorter, Joe Henderson and John Coltrane.

Berg was killed in a traffic accident in East Hampton, New York, while he and his wife were driving near his home when a cement truck that had skidded on ice hit his car.

== Discography ==
=== As leader ===
- New Birth (Xanadu, 1978)
- Steppin' Live in Europe (Red, 1982)
- Short Stories (Denon, 1987)
- Cycles (Denon, 1988)
- In the Shadows (Denon, 1990)
- Back Roads (Denon, 1991)
- Virtual Reality (Denon, 1992)
- Enter the Spirit (GRP, 1993)
- Riddles (Stretch, 1994)
- Another Standard (Stretch, 1997)
- The Jazz Times Superband (Concord 2000)
- The Meeting (Sound Hills 2009)

=== As sideman ===
With Tom Harrell

- Aurora (Adamo, 1976)
- Stories (Contemporary, 1988)
- Visions (Contemporary, 1991)

With Sam Jones

- Changes & Things (Xanadu, 1978)
- Something in Common (Muse, 1978)
- Visitations (SteepleChase, 1978)

With Horace Silver

- Silver 'n Brass (Blue Note, 1975)
- Silver 'n Wood (Blue Note, 1976)
- Silver 'n Voices (Blue Note, 1977)

With Leni Stern

- Clairvoyant (Passport, 1986)
- The Next Day (Passport, 1987)
- Secrets (Enja, 1989)

With Mike Stern

- Upside Downside (Atlantic, 1986)
- Time in Place (Atlantic, 1988)
- Jigsaw (Atlantic, 1989)
- Odds or Evens (Atlantic, 1991)
- Standards and Other Songs (Atlantic, 1992)

With Cedar Walton

- Eastern Rebellion 2 (Timeless, 1977)
- Animation (Columbia/CBS, 1978)
- First Set (SteepleChase, 1978)
- Eastern Rebellion 3 (Timeless, 1980)
- Soundscapes (CBS, 1980)
- The Maestro (Muse, 1981)
- Second Set (SteepleChase, 1983)
- Third Set (SteepleChase, 1983)
- Eastern Rebellion 4 (Timeless, 1984)
- Cedar's Blues (Red, 1985)
- Reliving the Moment (HighNote, 2014)

With others

- Karrin Allyson, Ballads (Concord Jazz, 2001)
- Frans Bak, Hymn to the Rainbow (L+R, 1992)
- Randy Brecker, Live at Sweet Basil (Sonet, 1989)
- Gary Burton, Cool Nights (GRP, 1991)
- Gary Burton, Six Pack (GRP, 1992)
- Dennis Chambers, Getting Even (Glass House, 1992)
- Joe Chambers, Phantom of the City (Candid, 1992)
- Marc Copland, Stompin' with Savoy (Savoy 1995)
- Chick Corea, Time Warp (Stretch, 1995)
- Tom Coster, Let's Set the Record Straight (JVC, 1993)
- Tom Coster, The Forbidden Zone (JVC, 1994)
- Pino Daniele, Scio (EMI, 1984)
- Miles Davis, You're Under Arrest (Columbia, 1985)
- Barbara Dennerlein, That's Me (Enja, 1992)
- Niels Lan Doky, The Truth (Storyville, 1988)
- Niels Lan Doky, Dreams (Milestone, 1990)
- Kenny Drew Jr., The Flame Within (Jazz City, 1989)
- Kenny Drew, Lite Flite (SteepleChase, 1977)
- Eliane Elias, A Long Story (Manhattan, 1991)
- Al Foster, Mr. Foster (Better Days, 1979)
- Antonio Farao, Far Out (CAM Jazz, 2002)
- Carl Filipiak, Right on Time (Geometric, 1993)
- Carl Filipiak, Peripheral Vision (Geometric, 1997)
- Moncef Genoud, Jean-Luc Lavanchy, Ivor Malherbe featuring Bob Berg, New York Journey (Seeds 1990)
- Dizzy Gillespie, Rhythmstick (1990)
- Gerald Gradwohl, ABQ (EmArcy, 2003)
- Eddie Henderson, So What (Eighty-Eight's, 2002)
- Monika Herzig, The Time Flies (Flavoredtune 2018)
- Billy Higgins, Soweto (Red, 1979)
- Billy Higgins, Once More (Red, 1980)
- Dieter Ilg, Summerhill (Lipstick, 1991)
- B.B. King, Here & There (Hip-O, 2001)
- Joe Locke, 4 Walls of Freedom (Sirocco, 2003)
- Mike Mandel, Utopia Parkway (Vanguard, 1980)
- John McNeil, Embarkation (SteepleChase, 1978)
- Jason Miles, World Tour (Lipstick, 1994)
- Jason Miles, Miles to Miles (Narada, 2005)
- Idris Muhammad, House of the Rising Sun (Kudu, 1976)
- Idris Muhammad, You Ain't No Friend of Mine! (Fantasy, 1978)
- Wolfgang Muthspiel, Timezones (Amadeo, 1989)
- Wolfgang Muthspiel, The Promise (Amadeo, 1990)
- Players Association, Turn the Music Up! (Vanguard, 1979)
- Players Association, We Got the Groove! (Vanguard, 1980)
- Valery Ponomarev, A Star for You (Reservoir, 1997)
- Tom Schuman, Extremities (GRP, 1990)
- Ben Sidran, Life's a Lesson (Go Jazz, 1993)
- Emiel van Egdom, This is for You (Optimism, 1988)
- Steps Ahead, Holding Together (NYC, 2002)
- Ulf Wakenius, Venture (L+R, 1992)
- Gary Willis, Bent (Alchemy, 1998)
