= Bob Malach =

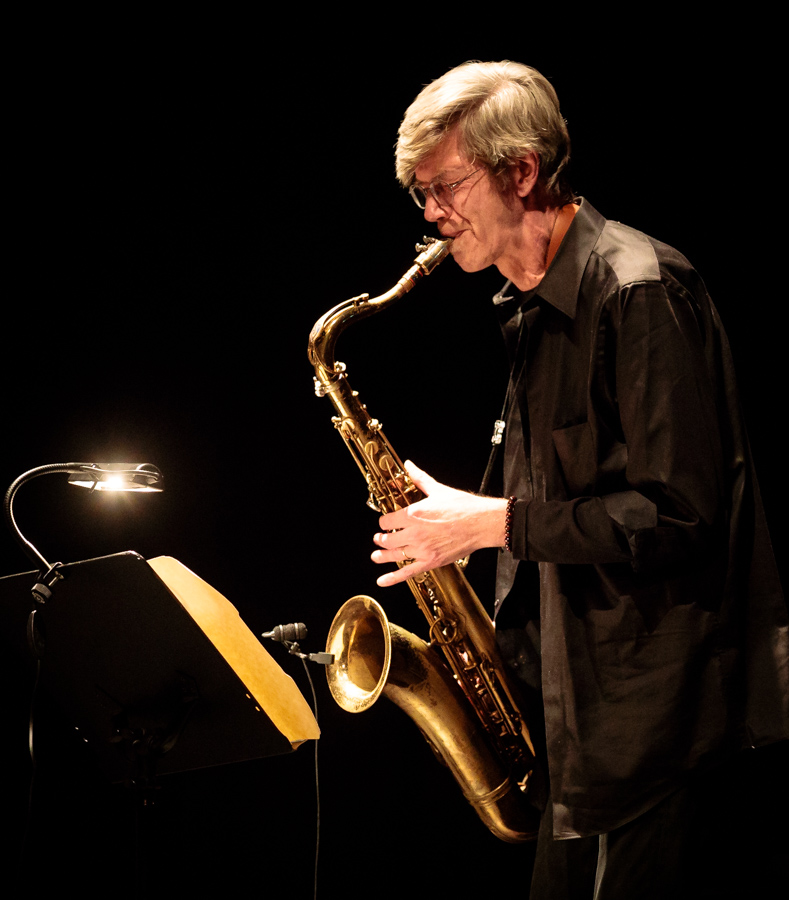
- Bob Malach during a concert with Dave Weckl band and Mike Stern, 2017

Background information
- Born: August 23, 1954 (age 71); Philadelphia, Pennsylvania, U.S.
- Genres: Jazz
- Occupation: Musician
- Instrument: Saxophone

Bob Malach (born August 23, 1954) is an American jazz saxophonist.

Malach learned several reed instruments in his youth, and played with Philadelphia soul bands such as The Stylistics and The O'Jays while still a teenager. He played in the big bands of Lin Biviano and Les Elgart in the mid-1970s, then moved to New York City in 1977, where he met Alphonse Mouzon. He recorded with Mouzon and went on tour with him in Europe, leading to eventual collaborations with European jazz artists including George Gruntz, Chris Hinze, Joachim Kuhn, Didier Lockwood, Palle Mikkelborg, Michel Petrucciani, Aldo Romano, Bo Stief, and Jasper Van't Hof.

In the US, Malach played extensively both in jazz circles and with pop, rock, and soul musicians. He worked with Stanley Clarke in the 1970s, and in the 1980s and 1990s played with, among others, Madonna, Horace Silver, Bob Mintzer, Robben Ford, Stevie Wonder, Steve Miller, Joe Zawinul, Mike Stern, Georgie Fame, Ben Sidran, Leni Stern, and Dave Weckl. Bob has a son, Tom Malach, who is one of the guitarists for the band “Garcia Peoples”.

== Discography ==
=== As leader/co-leader ===
- Some People (MPS, 1980)
- Mood Swing (Go Jazz, 1990)
- Dinner for Two with Jasper van 't Hof (MA Music, 1990)
- The Prague Concert with Jasper van 't Hof (P&J Music, 1992)
- The Searcher (Go Jazz, 1995)
- After Hours (Go Jazz, 1998)
- Conversations with Michel with Michel Petrucciani (Go Jazz, 2000)
- Pseudopodia with Jasper van 't Hof (In+Out, 2008)

=== As sideman ===
- Louis Bellson, Originals (Stash, 1980)
- George Gruntz, First Prize (Enja, 1989)
- Bill O'Connell, Latin Jazz Fantasy (Random Chance)
- Mike Stern, Between The Lines (Atlantic Jazz, 1996)
- Mike Stern, Is What It Is (Atlantic, 1994)
- Dexter Wansel, Life On Mars (Philadelphia International, 1976)
- Joe Zawinul, Faces & Places (ESC, 2002)
