= Bob Franceschini =

American jazz saxophonist

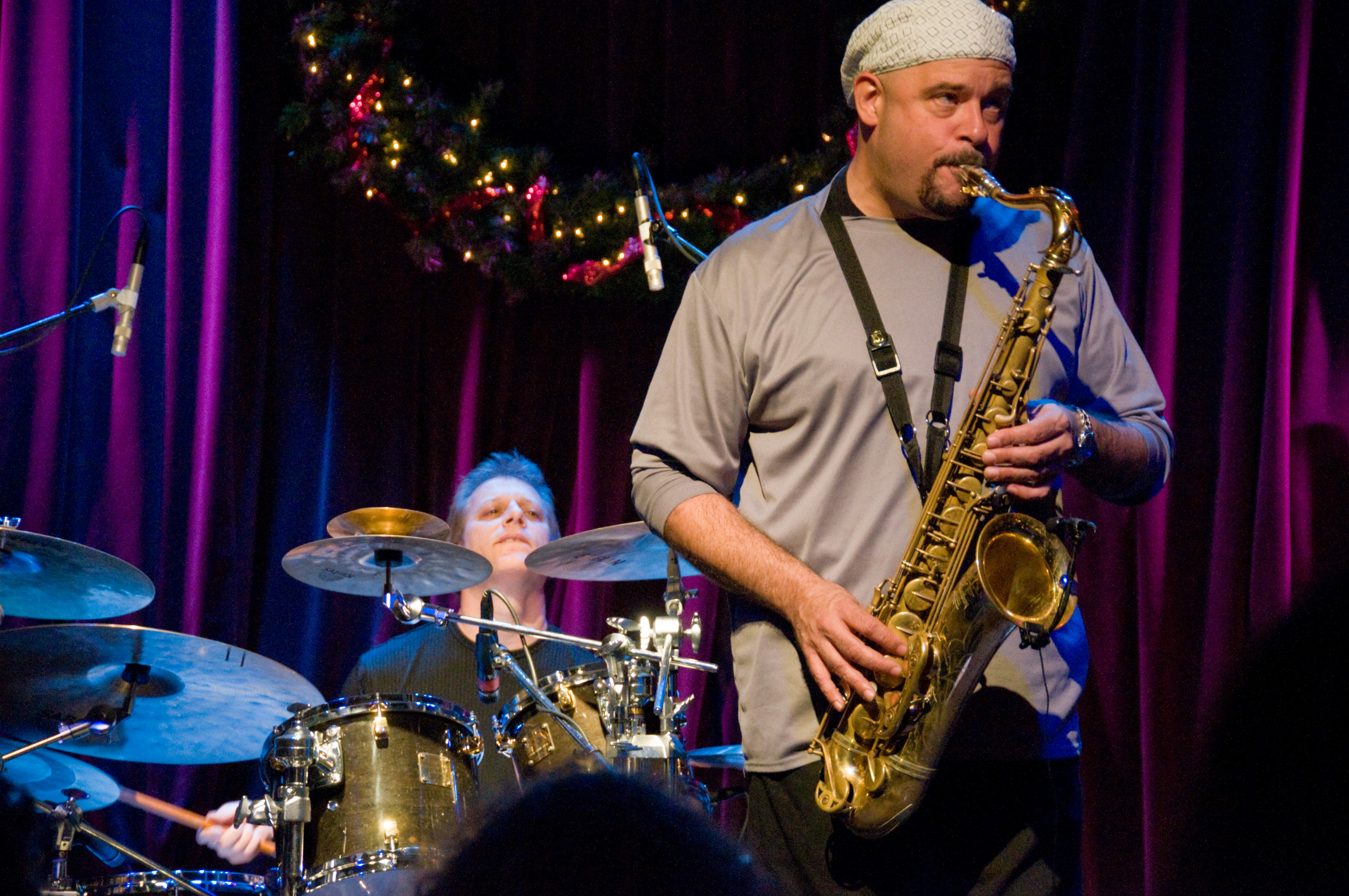
- Bob Franceschini performing with Dave Weckl

Background information
- Born: December 15, 1961 (age 63); Manhattan, New York, U.S.
- Genres: Jazz
- Occupation: Musician
- Instrument(s): Saxophone, Flute
- Years active: 1978–present
- Website: bobfranceschini.com

Bob Franceschini (born 1961) is an American jazz saxophonist and instrumentalist, songwriter, and arranger. He has appeared on more than eighty albums including those of Mike Stern, Paul Simon, and Willie Colón.

Franceschini grew up in Manhattan and started playing music at a young age, he began playing professionally as early as 17-18 with Tito Puente and now tours worldwide with the Mike Stern Band, Willie Colón, Dennis Chambers and the Victor Wooten Trio, as well as many others. When not touring, Franceschini is a faculty member at Victor Wooten's Camp For Music and Nature and co-hosts an annual saxophone retreat with Bob Reynolds and Bob Hemenger called the Inside:Outside Retreat for Saxophonists.

== Biography ==
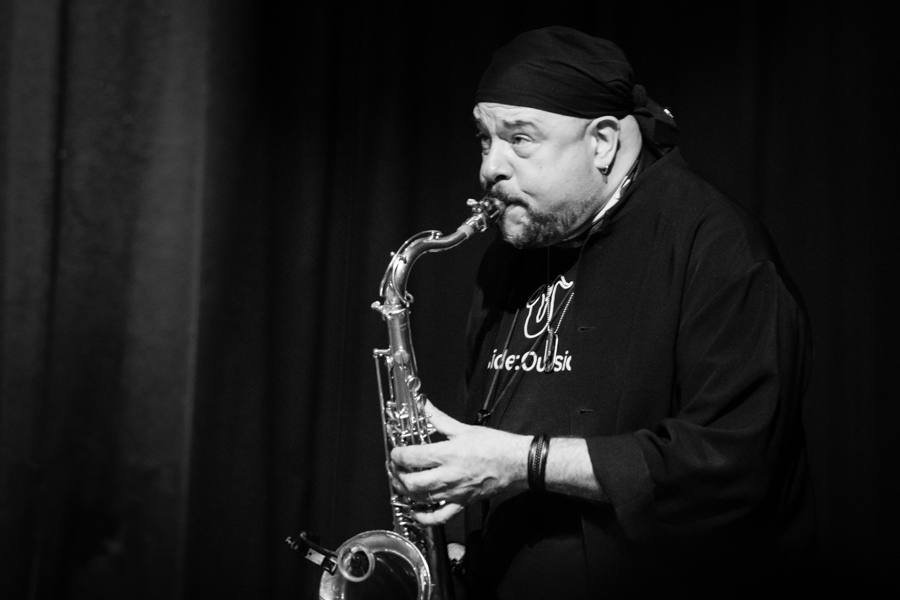
Bob Franceschini performing in 2018

=== Career ===
Throughout his career, Franceschini has composed and arranged music for many artists including Tower of Power and Victor Wooten. Additionally, he has toured internationally and recorded with Mike Stern, Paul Simon, Celine Dion, Tito Puente, BeBe Winans, Ricky Martin, Lionel Richie, Eddie Palmieri, Victor Wooten as well as many others.

In 2001 Franceschini performed on Mike Stern's Grammy Nominated album Voices.

== Select discography ==
Co-leader

- Whole Lotta Love: The Music of Led Zeppelin with Orlando Le Fleming, Kevin Hays, Obed Calvaire (Chesky, 2021) – recorded in 2020

With Willie Colón

- Honra y Cultura (Sony Discos Inc.)
- Y vuelve otra vez (Madacy Latino)
- Hecho en Puerto Rico (Sony Music Distribution)
- Top Secret (Fania Special)

With Paul Simon

- Songs from The Capeman (Warner Elektra Atlantic Corp.)

With Celine Dion

- These Are Special Times (Epic)

With Mike Stern

- Who Let the Cats Out (Heads Up, 2006)
- New Morning: The Paris Concert (Inakustik, 2008)[DVD-Video]
