= Mike Stern =

American jazz guitarist (born 1953)

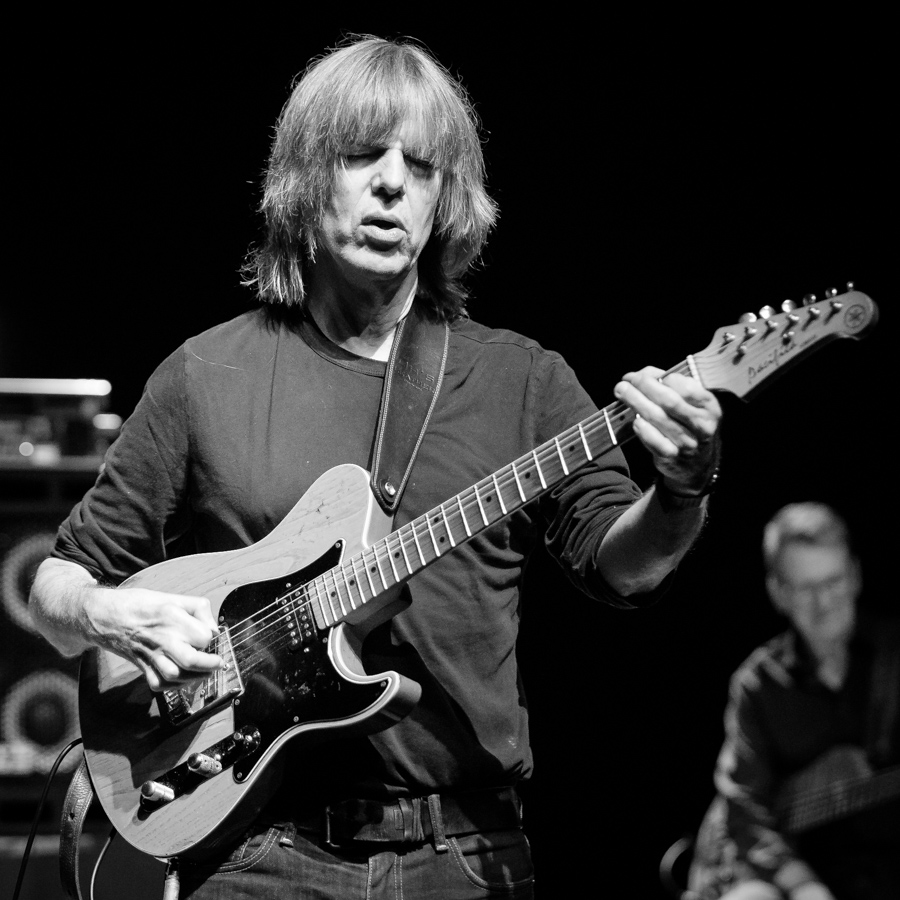
- Stern in 2018

Background information
- Born: January 10, 1953 (age 73); Boston, Massachusetts, U.S.
- Genres: Jazz, jazz fusion, post-bop
- Occupation: Guitarist
- Years active: 1976–present
- Labels: Atlantic, Heads Up
- Formerly of: Blood, Sweat & Tears
- Website: mikestern.org

Mike Stern (born Michael Sedgwick, January 10, 1953) is an American jazz guitarist. After playing with Blood, Sweat & Tears, he worked with drummer Billy Cobham, then with trumpeter Miles Davis from 1981 to 1983 and again in 1985. He then began a solo career, releasing more than 20 albums.

Stern was named Best Jazz Guitarist of 1993 by Guitar Player magazine. At the Festival International de Jazz de Montréal in June 2007, he was given the Miles Davis Award, which was created to recognize internationally acclaimed jazz artists whose work has contributed significantly to the renewal of the genre. In 2009, Stern was listed on Down Beat's list of 75 best jazz guitarists of all time. He received Guitar Player magazine's Certified Legend Award on January 21, 2012.

== Personal life ==
Stern was born Michael Sedgwick in Boston, Massachusetts, the son of Helen Stern (née Helen Phillips Burroughs), a sculptor and art patron, and Henry Dwight Sedgwick V. His adoptive stepfather was Philip M. Stern, the son of businessman Edgar B. Stern Sr. His half-sister is actress Kyra Sedgwick. Stern is married to guitarist and vocalist Leni Stern.

== Career ==
Stern grew up in Washington, D.C., and began playing guitar at age 12, emulating the likes of B.B. King, Eric Clapton and Jimi Hendrix. However, it wasn’t until he entered the Berklee College of Music in Boston that he took guitar seriously. When he was twenty-two, he became a member of Blood, Sweat & Tears and spent three years with the band, appearing on the albums More Than Ever and Brand New Day.

Simultaneously, he was lead guitarist of a D.C. glam-rock band, the Dubonettes, who later became Charlie and the Pep Boys. The quintet released one album, the Nils Lofgren-produced Daddy's Girl, in 1976 before Stern left the group.

In 1979, he joined Billy Cobham's fusion band. Two years later he joined Miles Davis, making his public debut in 1981, a performance recorded on the album We Want Miles. He remained with Davis through 1983 until he was replaced by guitarist John Scofield. At the time, Stern was a heavy drinker and heroin user. In a 2009 interview, he said, "If Miles wants to put you in a rehab, you know you've got something wrong". From 1983 to 1984 he toured with Jaco Pastorius (a period also characterized by heavy drug use) and in 1985 returned to tour with Davis. Stern and his wife were in rehabilitation; they were also helped by Michael Brecker and others.

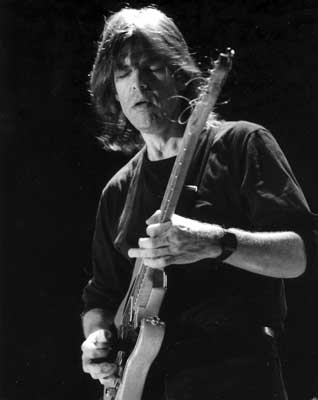
Mike Stern at the Liri Blues Festival, Italy, in 1998

Stern's solo debut, Upside Downside, with Jaco Pastorius, David Sanborn, and Bob Berg, was released on Atlantic Records in 1986. From 1986 through 1988, he was a member of Michael Brecker's quintet, appearing on Don't Try This at Home. His second Atlantic album, 1988's Time in Place, featured Peter Erskine on drums, Jim Beard on keyboards, Jeff Andrews on bass, Don Alias on percussion and Don Grolnick on organ. His next album, Jigsaw, was produced by guitarist Steve Khan and included the song "Chief", Stern's tribute to Miles Davis.

In 1989, Stern formed a touring group with Bob Berg, Dennis Chambers and Lincoln Goines. They remained together through 1992 and are featured on the album Odds or Evens. In 1992, Stern joined a reunited Brecker Brothers Band for two years. His acclaimed 1993 album, Standards (and Other Songs), led to his being named Best Jazz Guitarist of the Year by the readers and critics of Guitar Player. He followed that with 1994's Is What It Is and 1996's Between the Lines, both of which received Grammy Award nominations. In 1997 he released Give and Take, with bassist John Patitucci, drummer Jack DeJohnette, percussionist Don Alias and special guests Michael Brecker and David Sanborn. He won the Orville W. Gibson Award for Best Jazz Guitarist.

After fifteen years with Atlantic, Stern signed with ESC Records for the 2004 release of These Times, an eclectic album that included guest appearances by bassist Richard Bona, saxophonist Kenny Garrett and banjoist Béla Fleck. He joined the Heads Up label with the August 2006 release of Who Let the Cats Out? In 2008, he collaborated with the Yellowjackets for their Lifecycle album, contributing two compositions and performing on most of the tracks, and toured with the Yellowjackets for much of 2008 and 2009. In February 2009, in the first of a series of articles celebrating Down Beat's 75th anniversary, Stern was named one of the 75 Great Guitarists of all time.

In August 2009, Stern released Big Neighborhood, which was nominated for a Grammy Award for Best Contemporary Jazz Album.

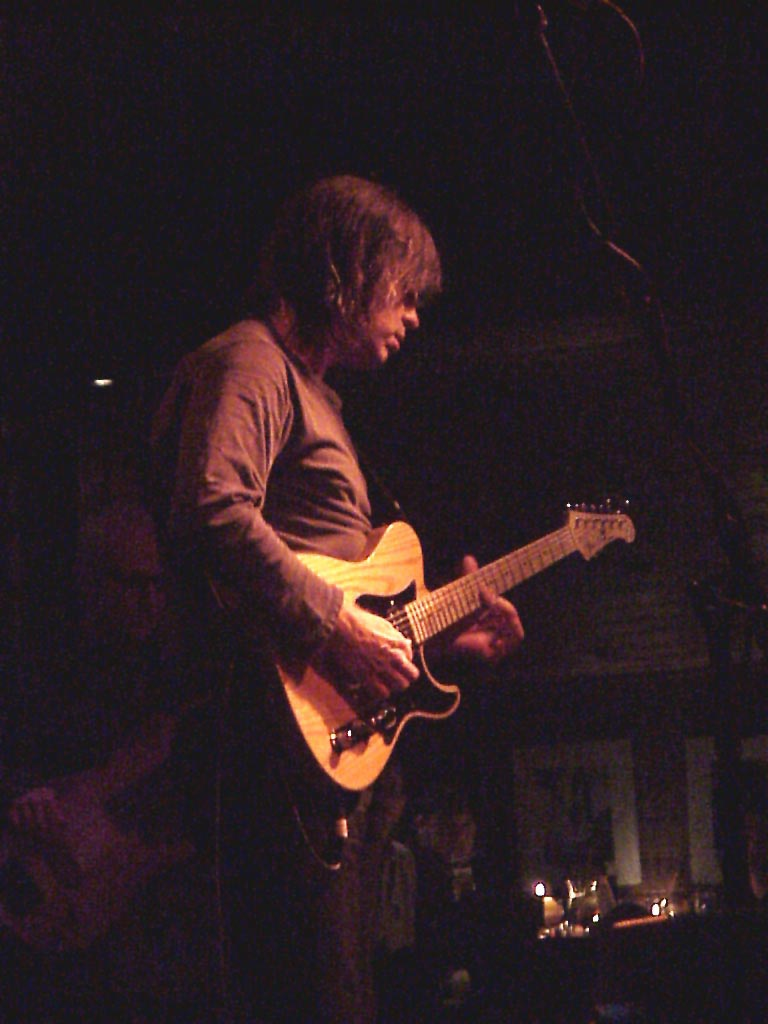
Stern performing in Munich, 2001

He was presented with Guitar Player magazine's Certified Legend Award on January 21, 2012. This was given to him at the Muriel Anderson All-Star Guitar night, where he performed with Lee Ritenour.

In 2014, Stern toured with guitarist Eric Johnson in the Eclectic Guitar Tour. They recorded an album of the same name.

In the summer of 2016, Stern reported serious injuries to his shoulders and right arm after tripping and falling. It ended his European tour, and he had to modify his playing technique to keep performing. In the summer of 2017 he returned to Europe on tour with a new formation called Mike Stern/Randy Brecker Band, featuring Randy Brecker (trumpet), Teymur Phell (bass guitar) and Lenny White (drums). In 2019, Mike Stern collaborated with the Jeff Lorber Fusion to release Eleven.

== Equipment ==
An early and important guitar for Stern was a hybrid 1950s/1960s Fender Telecaster, previously owned by Roy Buchanan and Danny Gatton, which was stolen from him in an armed robbery in Boston. This guitar is the basis for a custom-made guitar built by Boston-based luthier Michael Aronson.

The Aronson guitar is in turn the basis for the Yamaha PA1511MS, the Mike Stern signature model. The neck position pickup is a Seymour Duncan '59 and it has a Tele Hot Rail in the bridge.

Stern uses a pair of Fender Twin amps or his Yamaha G100-212. Stern's recognizable chorused sound is created in part by a Yamaha SPX-90, split for stereo. His pedal board consists mostly of Boss pedals. He uses two Boss DD-3 digital delays, one of which is set to a long delay time for "big, spacey sounds." His distortion pedal is a Boss Distortion DS-1.

== Awards and honors ==
- Nominations for Grammy Award for Best Contemporary Jazz Album: Is What It Is (1995), Between the Lines (1997), Voices (2002), Who Let the Cats Out? (2007), Lifecycle (2009), Big Neighborhood (2010)
- Jazz Guitarist of the Year, Guitar Player (1993)
- Best Jazz Guitarist, Orville W. Gibson Award (1997)
- 75 Great Guitarists, DownBeat (2009)
- Certified Award, Guitar Player (2012)

== Discography ==
=== As leader/co-leader ===
- High Standards with Steve Slagle, Teddy Saunders, Harvie Swartz, Victor Lewis (Polydor, 1982)
- Neesh (Trio, 1983) – aka Fat Time
- Upside Downside (Atlantic, 1986)
- Time in Place (Atlantic, 1988)
- Jigsaw (Atlantic, 1989)
- Odds or Evens (Atlantic, 1991)
- Standards (and Other Songs) (Atlantic, 1992)
- Dedication with Bunny Brunel, Billy Childs, Vinnie Colaiuta (Musidisc, 1992)
- Is What It Is (Atlantic, 1994)
- Vertical Reality with Jerry Bergonzi, Andy LaVerne, George Mraz, Billy Hart (Musidisc, 1994)
- Between the Lines (Atlantic, 1996)
- Give and Take (Atlantic, 1997)
- 55 Bar Sessions with Hiram Bullock, Haru Takauchi, Leni Stern (Paddle Wheel, 1998)
- Play (Atlantic, 1999)
- Voices (Atlantic, 2001)
- These Times (ESC, 2003)
- Who Let the Cats Out? (Heads Up, 2006)
- Big Neighborhood (Heads Up, 2009)
- All Over the Place (Heads Up, 2012) – rec. 2011
- Eclectic with Eric Johnson (Heads Up, 2014)
- Trip (Heads Up, 2017)
- Eleven with Jeff Lorber Fusion (Concord Jazz, 2019)
- Echoes (and Other Songs) (Mack Avenue, 2024)

=== As a member ===
Blood, Sweat & Tears

- More Than Ever (Columbia, 1976)
- Brand New Day (ABC, 1977)

Steps Ahead

- Live in Tokyo 1986 (NYC, 1994)

Bob Berg/Mike Stern Group

- Games with Bob Berg (feat. Lincoln Goines, Dennis Chambers) (Jazz Door, 2008, Recorded live in USA 1990)

=== As sideman ===
With Michael Brecker

- Don't Try This At Home (Impulse!, 1998)
- Jazz Academy: Pure Essentials for Jazzaholics (C&B Productions, 2006)
- Live At Fabrik 1987 (Fabrik, 2022)

With Miles Davis

- The Man with the Horn (Columbia, 1981)
- We Want Miles (Columbia, 1982)
- Star People (Columbia, 1983)

With Harvie Swartz

- Urban Earth (Gramavision, 1985)
- Smart Moves (Gramavision, 1986)
- In a Different Light (Bluemoon, 1990)
- Harvie S Trio, Going For It (Savant, 2021)

With others

- Randy Roos, Mistral (Spoonfed, 1978)
- Billy Cobham, Stratus (Inak, 1981)
- Michael Mantler, Something There (Watt, 1983)
- Steve Slagle, High Standards (Polydor, 1984)
- Lew Soloff, Yesterdays (Paddle Wheel, 1986)
- Kimiko Kasai, My One and Only Love (CBS/Sony, 1986)
- Bob Berg, Short Stories (Denon, 1987)
- Shunzo O'no, Manhattan Blue (Projazz, 1987)
- Jukkis Uotila, Live (Stunt, 1991)
- Chroma, Music on the Edge (CTI, 1991)
- Dieter Ilg, Summerhill (Lipstick, 1991)
- Brecker Brothers, Return of the Brecker Brothers (GRP, 1992)
- Tiger Okoshi, Echoes of a Note (JVC, 1993)
- Motohiko Hino, It's There (FunHouse, 1993)
- Jerry Bergonzi, Vertical Reality (Musidisc, 1994)
- Jim Hall, Dialogues (Telarc, 1995)
- Les Arbuckle, The Bush Crew (AudioQuest, 1995)
- Arturo Sandoval, Swingin' (GRP, 1986)
- Hue & Cry, Jazz Not Jazz (Linn, 1996)
- Jaco Pastorius, Live in New York City Volume Five - Raca (Big World Music, 1997)
- Pat Martino, All Sides Now (Blue Note, 1997)
- Jukkis Uotila, Avenida (Stunt, 1998)
- Ron Thaler, Grain (Hot Wire, 1998)
- Charles Blenzig, Charles Blenzig (Chase, 1989)
- Alex Riel, Rielatin' (Stunt, 2000)
- George Coleman, 4 Generations of Miles (Chesky, 2002)
- DR Big Band, Chromazone (EMI, 2008)
- Yellowjackets, Lifecycle (Heads Up, 2008)
- Cindy Blackman, Another Lifetime (4Q, 2010)
- Jan Gunnar Hoff, Jan Gunnar Hoff Group feat Mike Stern (Losen, 2018)
- Steve Bailey, Carolina (Treehouse, 2020)
- Victor Wooten, Steve Bailey, Bass Extremes, S'low Down (Vix, 2022)
- Derek Sherinian, Vortex (Inside Out Music, 2022)
- Dan Costa, Beams (Dan Costa, 2023)
- Roman Miroshnichenko, Roman Miroshnichenko plays Stas Namin (SNC, 2023)
- Varre Vartiainen, Head & Heart (Eclipse Music, 2025)
