= Leni Stern =

German guitarist and singer

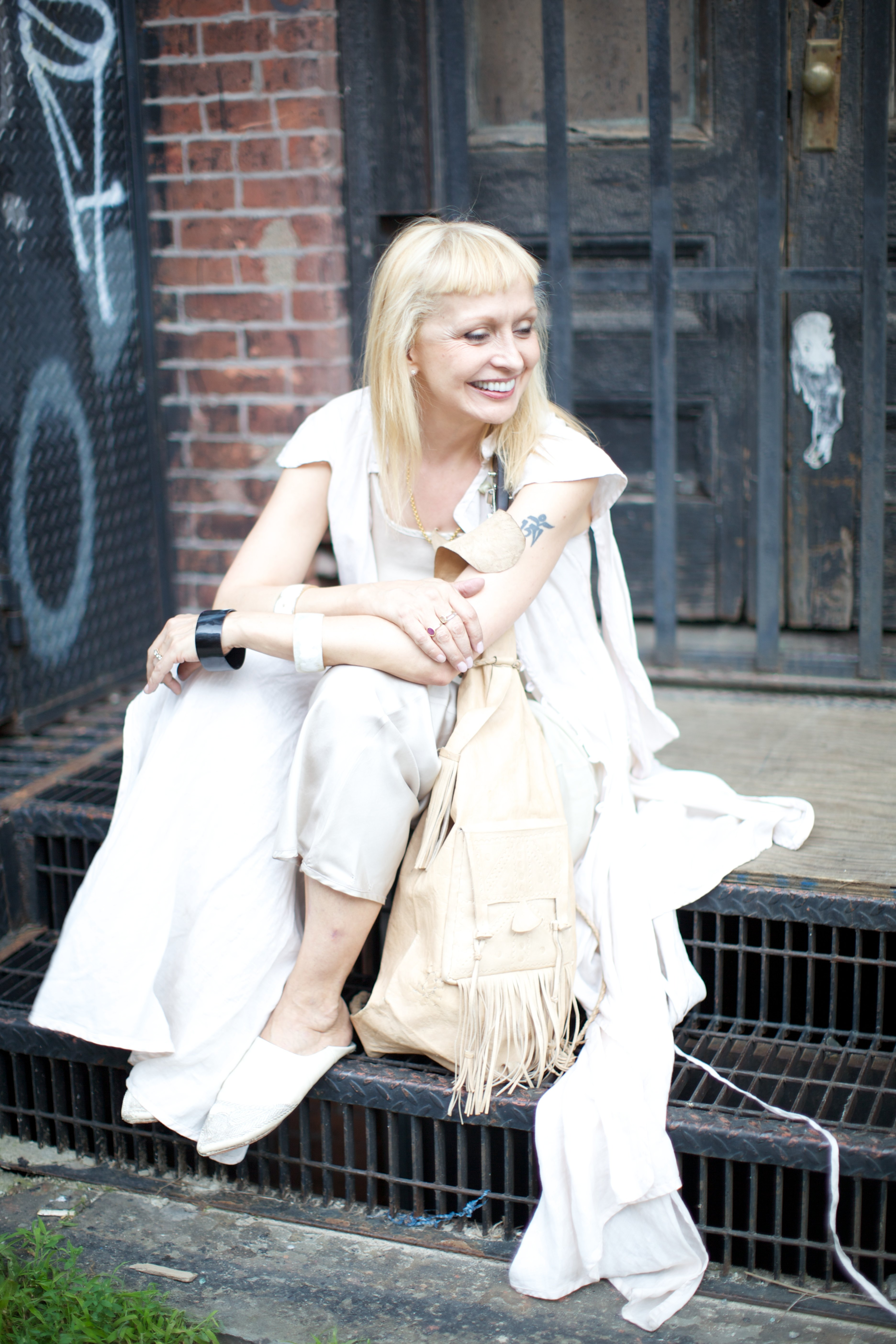

Background information
- Birth name: Magdalena Thora
- Born: 28 April 1952 (age 72); Munich, West Germany
- Genres: Jazz, rock, fusion, world music
- Instrument(s): Guitar, vocals, ngoni
- Website: lenistern.com

Leni Stern (born 28 April 1952) is a German jazz guitarist and singer.

== Early life ==
Stern was born Magdalena Thora, in Germany on 28 April 1952. She was interested in music from an early age, beginning piano studies at the age of six and taking on the guitar a few years later. She was an actress in Germany, including appearing on television, then enrolled at the Berklee College of Music in 1977. She lived in Boston until 1980, then moved to New York.

== Later life and career ==
In 1983, she formed a band of her own with Paul Motian on drums and Bill Frisell on guitar. Vocals became a more important part of her music from the 1997 release of Black Guitar. She is married to guitarist Mike Stern.

== Discography ==
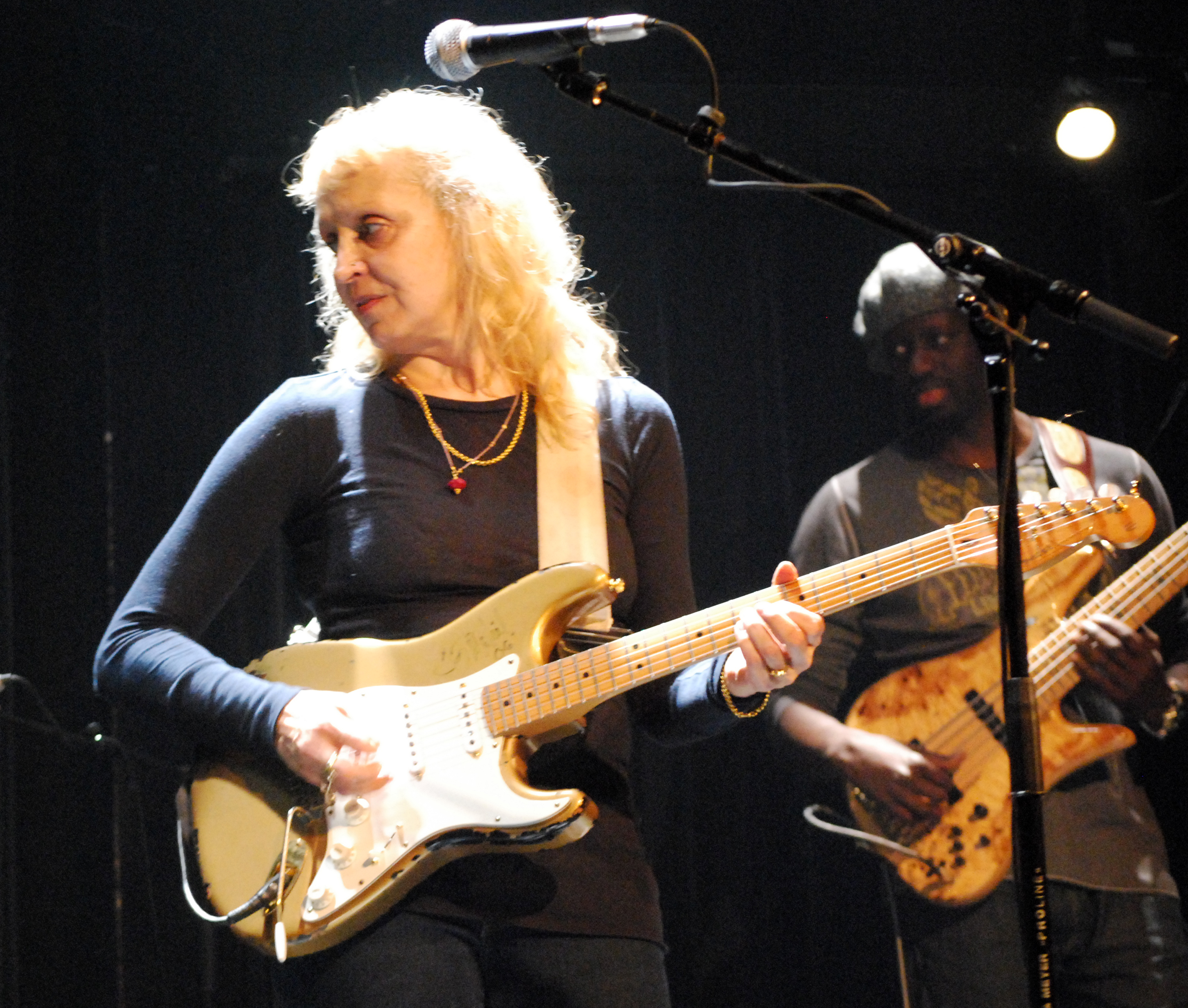
Stern performing in 2009

- Clairvoyant (Passport Jazz, 1986)
- The Next Day (Passport Jazz, 1987)
- Secrets (Enja, 1989)
- Closer to the Light (Enja, 1990)
- Ten Songs (Lipstick, 1992)
- Like One (Lipstick, 1993)
- Words (Lipstick, 1995)
- Black Guitar (1997)
- Kindness of Strangers (Leni Stern, 2000)
- Finally the Rain Has Come (Leni Stern, 2002)
- When Evening Falls (Leni Stern, 2004)
- Love Comes Quietly (Leni Stern, 2006)
- Africa (Leni Stern, 2007)
- Alu Mayé (Have You Heard) (Leni Stern, 2007)
- Sa Belle Belle Ba (Leni Stern, 2010)
- Sabani (Leni Stern, 2012)
- Smoke, No Fire (Leni Stern, 2012)
- Jellel (Leni Stern, 2013)
- Dakar Suite (Leni Stern, 2016)
- 3 (Leni Stern, 2018)
- 4 (Leni Stern, 2020)
