= Jim Beard =

American jazz pianist (1960–2024)

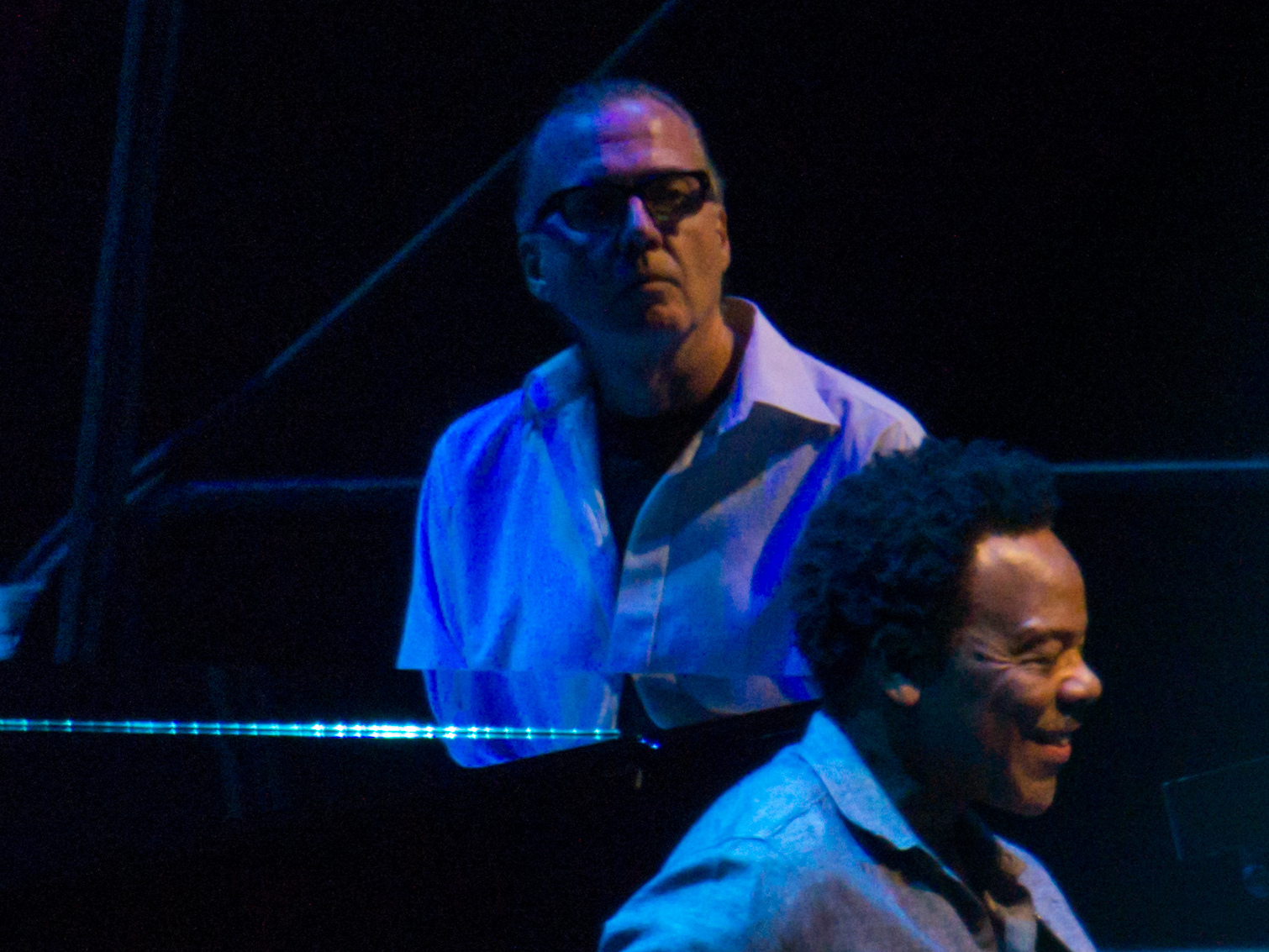
- Beard (center) performing with Steely Dan in 2017

Background information
- Born: James Arthur Beard; August 26, 1960; Ridley Park, Pennsylvania, U.S.
- Died: March 2, 2024 (aged 63) New York City, New York, U.S.
- Genres: Jazz fusion
- Occupations: Musician, composer, arranger
- Instrument: Keyboards
- Years active: 1985–2024
- Formerly of: Steely Dan, Mahavishnu Orchestra
- Website: jimbeard.com

James Arthur Beard (August 26, 1960 – March 2, 2024) was an American jazz pianist and keyboardist, composer, arranger and producer who worked with Steely Dan, Wayne Shorter, John McLaughlin, Pat Metheny, John Scofield, Mike Stern, Dennis Chambers, and Bob Berg, among others. First performing professionally in college alongside a bar band, Beard then became the pianist of McLaughlin's band, Mahavishnu, after moving to New York in 1985. He also produced seven albums from 1990 through 2019, and wrote several compositions for jazz artists.

== Early life ==
Beard was born in Ridley Park, Pennsylvania on August 26, 1960. He developed a keen interest in music from an early age. He first learned to play the piano at the age of 6, before playing and later studying about other instruments, including the bass, clarinet, and saxophone. As a teenager, he studied arranging with Don Sebesky, and piano with Roland Hanna, and George Shearing for several years.

Beard took his first overseas tour at the age of sixteen with the American Youth Jazz Orchestra under the direction of Hal Schiff. He attended Indiana University, studying jazz under David Baker and classical piano under John Ogdon. In college, he performed professionally with Slide Hampton and Red Rodney and was in a bar band whose members included Jon Herington, Shawn Pelton, Kenny Aronoff, Robert Hurst, and Chris Botti. His musical influences in college were Herbie Hancock, Wynton Kelly, and Prince.

== Music career ==
Beard moved to New York in 1985 and became the pianist of John McLaughlin's Mahavishnu, started working relationships with Bill Evans and Mike Stern and had recorded with Dave Liebman. He also began producing many successful recordings for artists such as Mike Stern, Bob Berg, Evans and Eliane Elias. In 1986, he began a working relationship with Wayne Shorter that lasted until 2000. In 1988, he became a member of John Scofield's band and toured the world with Pat Metheny from 1992–1993.

During his early New York period, he wrote compositions for Michael Brecker and John McLaughlin. Many of Beard's compositions have been recorded by top jazz artists, such as "The Wait," by John McLaughlin; "Riddle Me This," by Bob Berg; "In the Hat," by Victor Bailey; "The Gentleman and Hizcaine," by Michael Brecker; and "I'll Miss You," by Bill Evans.

=== Albums and awards ===
Beard's albums include Song of the Sun (1990), which features Wayne Shorter and Michael Brecker; Lost at the Carnival (1995); Truly (1997); Advocate (2000); Revolutions (2008); Show of Hands (2013); and Chunks and Chairknobs (2019).

His music productions and compositions have been nominated for seven Grammy Awards. He won a Grammy in 2007 as a featured performer on Some Skunk Funk (Randy and Michael Brecker).

== Later life and death ==
Beard taught at Berklee College of Music in Boston, the Mason Gross School of the Arts at Rutgers University, the Sibelius Academy in Helsinki, Finland, and the Aaron Copland School of Music in New York. He had taught graduate-level arranging, composing, and improvisation.

Beard died at a hospital in New York City, on March 2, 2024, at age 63.

== Discography ==
- Song of the Sun (CTI, 1990)
- Lost at the Carnival (Lipstick, 1994)
- Truly (Escapade, 1997)
- Advocate (JVC Victor, 1999)
- Revolutions with Vince Mendoza & The Metropole Orkest (Intuition, 2008)[SACD]
- Show of Hands (Moosicus, 2013)
- Chunks and Chairknobs (Jazzline, 2019)

== See also ==
- Russell Ferrante
- List of jazz arrangers
- Lyle Mays
- Joe Zawinul
