= APQ =

APQ may refer to:

- American Philosophical Quarterly, a scholarly journal
- APQ (album), an album by the Art Pepper Quartet

== See also ==
- apq, an ISO code for the A-Pucikwar language
