= Spike Wells =

English jazz drummer (born 1946)

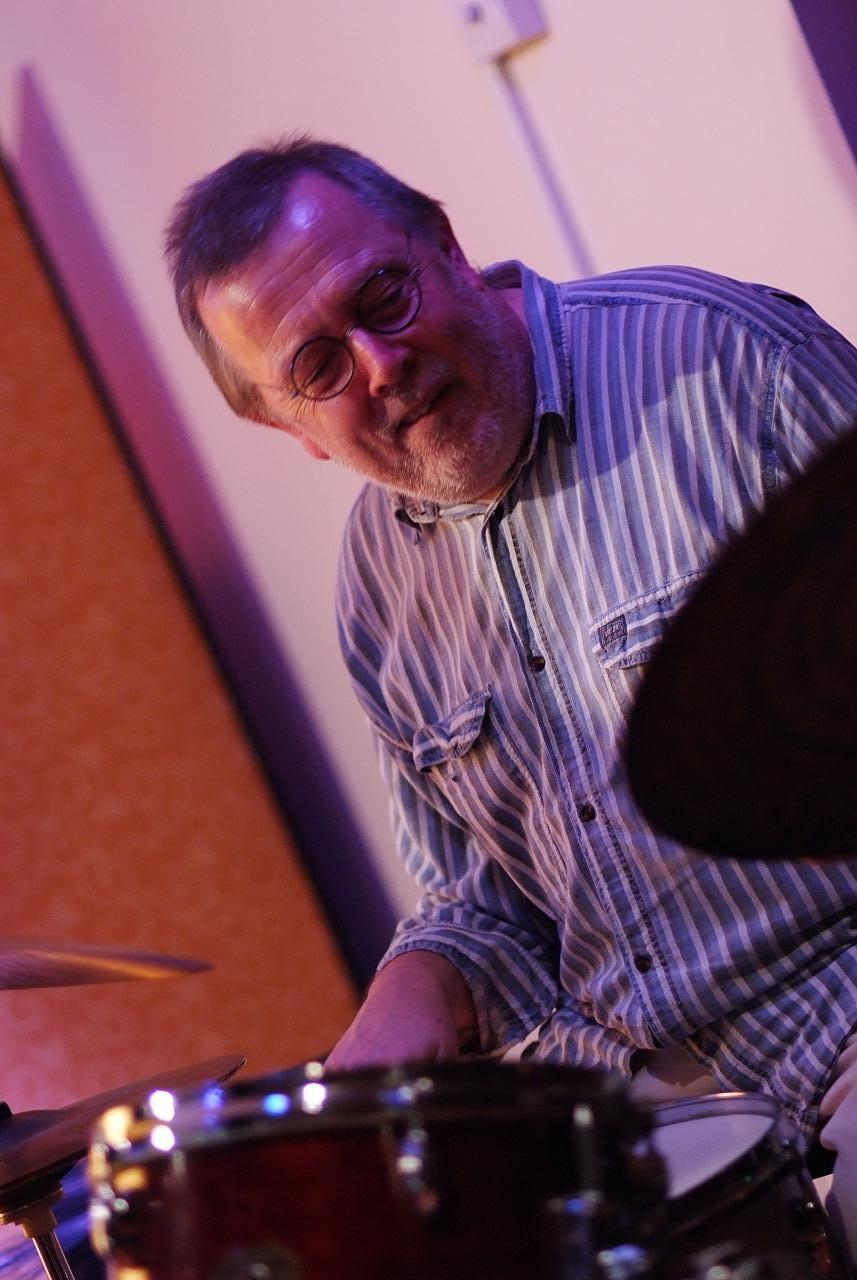
- Wells in May 2008
- Born: Michael Wells; 16 January 1946 (age 80); Tunbridge Wells, Kent, England
- Education: Canterbury Cathedral Choir School; Oxford University; London University
- Occupations: Jazz drummer and priest
- Website: www.spikewells.co.uk

Michael "Spike" Wells (born 16 January 1946) is an English jazz drummer and priest.

== Biography ==
Born in Tunbridge Wells, Kent, Wells was a chorister at Canterbury Cathedral Choir School. He became interested in jazz after coming across a recording by Dizzy Gillespie, which he found "very exciting".

He took up playing drums in his early teens: "I suppose the thing that really knocked me out about jazz was the rhythm, so I thought if I'm going to be in a jazz band I want to be the drummer." He later had lessons from former Miles Davis drummer Philly Joe Jones, who lived in London in 1967–69, and Wells was also very influenced by another of Davis's drummers, Tony Williams.

Wells read Greats at Oxford University, where he put together a quartet with tenor player Pat Crumly and pianist Brian Priestley that played with visitors including saxophonists Bobby Wellins, Tony Coe and Joe Harriott, and blues singer Jimmy Witherspoon.

In 1968, Wells began a PhD course in philosophy at London University, living in a house that was also home to bass player Ron Mathewson, alto sax player Ray Warleigh, trombonist Chris Pyne and pianist Mick Pyne. Mathewson was then playing in the quartet of tenor player Tubby Hayes, and asked Wells if he would be interested in joining the group. He arranged an audition with Hayes and guitarist Louis Stewart, at which "We played a blues, and Tubby looked at Ron and Louis and then said, 'Do you want the job?' Want the job. With the greatest jazz quartet in England?" Wells abandoned his PhD and became a professional musician. He played in the quintet of pianist Lionel Grigson, who had a regular weekly gig at The Troubadour coffee house in Old Brompton Road, with such musicians as Chris Bateson (trumpet), Pete Burden or Paul Zec on alto, and John Hart or David "Happy" Williams on bass.

The pianist Gordon Beck has stated that, in his opinion: "The union of Ron Mathewson and Spike Wells in Tubby's quartet with Stewart is the single greatest rhythm section in all of British jazz."

In 2004, Wells reflected on his hiring by Hayes:

It was an intuitive thing, a bit like people say about Miles Davis. He hired you because he heard something about your playing that he wanted, and as long as you provided it, he let you do what you wanted.… There were new freedoms opened up in the concept of how to play together rather than just accompanying. We were all spinning ideas off each other in a rather more democratic way and that was what Tubby liked to get into at that point. I think he was intent of freeing up the overall concept. And he found that inspired his own playing.

As well as playing with Hayes, in both his quartet and his big band, until the saxophonist's death in 1973, Wells spent a year in Humphrey Lyttelton's band, and also worked with many visiting soloists at Ronnie Scott's Jazz Club, including Stan Getz (with whom Wells toured Scandinavia), Roland Kirk, Art Farmer, Johnny Griffin and James Moody.

After five years' study, Wells qualified as a solicitor, and then practised law for 22 years, eventually working as in-house legal adviser for Lloyds Bank. He had drifted away from his faith in his teens, but in his early forties he had a "reconversion experience" and then developed a strong sense of vocation that led him to become a deacon in the Church of England when he was 49, and a year later to take early retirement from the bank and become a stipendiary curate at St Peter's Church, Brighton. As his music-making was still important to him, he later went into non-stipendiary ministry, and now works as both a priest and a musician.

== Selected discography ==
- Alan Barnes, Blessing in Disguise (2005)
- Ian Hamer, Acropolis (1966–74)
- Tubby Hayes Quartet, Live 1969 (1969)
- Tubby Hayes Big Band, England's Late Jazz Great (1969)
- John Horler, Gentle Piece (1993)
- John Horler, Not a Cloud in the Sky (2010)
- Peter King, East 34th Street (1983)
- Mike Pyne, Live at Ronnie Scott's (1990)
- Don Weller and Bobby Wellins, Nine Songs (2007)
- Bobby Wellins, Making Light Work (1983)
- Bobby Wellins, Birds of Brazil (1989)
- Bobby Wellins, Nomad (1992)
- Bobby Wellins, Fun (2004)
- Bobby Wellins, When the Sun Comes Out (2005)
- Spike Wells, Gwilym Simcock, Malcolm Creese, Reverence (2006)
