= Lionel Grigson =

English jazz musician and educator (1942–1994)

- Born: Lionel Jermyn Grigson; 12 February 1942; Cheltenham, Gloucestershire, England, UK
- Died: 14 June 1994 (aged 52) London, England, UK
- Education: Dartington Hall School; King's College, Cambridge
- Genre: Jazz
- Occupations: Musician; composer; writer; professor
- Instruments: piano, cornet, trumpet
- Father: Geoffrey Grigson

Lionel Jermyn Grigson (12 February 1942 – 14 June 1994) was an English jazz pianist, cornettist, trumpeter, composer, writer and music professor., who in the 1980s started the jazz course at the Guildhall School of Music.

Jan Ponsford recalls: "Lionel insisted everyone who taught on the course there, or any part of it, was referred to as Professor, and given the same status as the classical educators there. I was amused when a small pay cheque arrived, for some teaching I'd done for said course, addressed to Professor J. Ponsford. Respectable at last!"

As Simon Purcell wrote in The Independent newspaper: "Whether he inspired or inflamed, Grigson's energies often acted as a catalyst and his interest in, and support for, young jazz musicians contributed significantly to the growth and consolidation of jazz education in Britain....Within the context of a leading international conservatoire, the Guildhall School of Music, in London, Grigson did much to demonstrate and explain the underlying principles common to jazz, classical and indeed all music, and as a result produced a generation of jazz educators possessing a thorough grounding in an area where much educational work is left to chance."

Among his published books are Practical Jazz (1988), Jazz from Scratch (1991) and A Jazz Chord Book, as well as studies on the music of Charlie Parker, Louis Armstrong and Thelonious Monk.

The only son of poet and critic Geoffrey Grigson, Lionel Grigson died in London at the age of 52.

== Early life and education ==
Lionel Jermyn Grigson was born in Cheltenham, Gloucestershire, to poet and critic Geoffrey Grigson (1905–85) and his second wife Berta Emma Kunert (1916–2001). Named after one of his father's brothers who was killed aged 19 in World War I, Lionel was educated at Dartington Hall School and at King's College, Cambridge (where he contributed writings on jazz to the university magazine Granta under the editorship of Alexis Lykiard). Grigson's first wife was the publisher Margaret Busby, co-founder of Allison & Busby.

== Music career ==
Grigson began playing jazz at the age of 12 at school at Dartington. During the early 1960s, he was co-leader of the award-winning Cambridge University Jazz Band that included Art Themen (who has acknowledged Grigson's "off-the-wall" influence, saying of him: "He kind of sprang from the womb knowing the rudiments of bebop"), Dave Gelly, John Hart and Jonathan Lynn. As Spike Wells has written, "by 1962, the undergraduate modern jazz scene revolved around Lionel Grigson." Reporting on the finals of the Inter-University Jazz Contest in March 1962 at Queen Mary College, John Merrydown wrote: "But, as last year, the absolutely stand-out musicianship and judges' choice came from Cambridge, Dave Gelly, Art Themen (tenors), Lionel Grigson (a sensitive trumpet player, who only needs a little more projection) and John Hart (bass). For conviction and control this group left the rest standing." Grigson's university contemporary John Cameron has written of being part of the Cambridge "town" rhythm section: "Then there were players like Lionel Grigson, John Hart and Johnny Lynn and they were the 'university' rhythm section and tended to be a bit cerebral and played more like a Bill Evans-type rhythm section, whereas we used to play more like a Charles Mingus rhythm section." In a 1963 short drama film called Duet, Grigson is credited as a performer in the Music Department, alongside, Brian Gascoigne, John Hart and Jonathan Lynn.

Grigson was a member of the New Jazz Orchestra. Notable among these were conductor/ arranger Neil Ardley (Bristol), tenor-saxist Dave Gelly and pianist Lionel Grigson (both from Cambridge), trumpet players Ian Carr (Durham) and Mike Phlllipson (Nottingham), and, from the London music colleges, altoist Barbara Thompson and trombonist Paul Rutherford. Another ex-Cambridge man, John Hart, is the usual dep. for regular bassist Tony Reeves. The band, which included french horn, tuba and flute in its lineup, has been enthusiastically received at the Marquee Club and at various South London venues, including the Green Man at Blackheath."

In the later 1960s Grigson was resident at The Troubadour coffee house in Old Brompton Road, London, with a regular Sunday afternoon gig – his quintet, in which he played piano, featured Chris Bateson (trumpet), Pete Burden or Paul Zec (alto), Spike Wells or Joe Oliver (drums) and John Hart or David "Happy" Williams (bass) – and led his own jazz groups with musicians including John Hart (bass), Pete Burden (1941–2016) and Paul Zec (altos), Art Themen and Bobby Wellins (tenors), Spike Wells (drums), Dave Gelly, Mick Pyne and many others. In Alexis Lykiard's recollection, "Lionel, John Hart and Philly Joe Jones comprised one of the most exciting rhythm sections I shall ever hear." In 1969, the Lionel Grigson-Pete Burden quintet included Tony Levin on drums and Daryl Runswick on bass. Musician and songwriter Tom Norris was among younger musicians who also performed with Grigson. As Simon Purcell states, Grigson in his "detailed and considered approach to the piano ... drew on the music of three of his 'masters' – Bill Evans, Bud Powell and Horace Silver."

Grigson was in the original line-up of the jazz rock/fusion group If (alongside saxophonists Dick Morrissey and Dave Quincy, guitarist Terry Smith, Spike Wells on drums, and Daryl Runswick on bass), and a composition on their second album, If 2 (1970), is by Busby/Grigson.

During the early 1970s, Grigson led a multi-ethnic "Afro-Latin-Jazz group" called Ujamaa, "combining straight jazz with African, calypso, Latin and funk elements", the band's line-ups variously including Art Themen, Harry Beckett, John Mumford (trombone), Pete Burden, Paul Zec, Phil Lee, Alan Jackson, Paul Whitten (bass), and singer Jeanette Tavernier, among others. In 1980, Grigson was house pianist at Brighton Jazz Club; in 1981, he was appointed for a term as jazz musician in residence at King's College, Cambridge; and from 1984 to 1987 he was musical director of Ziggy's Jazz Club, a launching ground for new talent in British jazz, at a Sunday-night jam downstairs at The Albany in London's Great Portland Street. Grigson also played with some of the most notable international musicians in jazz, including Freddie Hubbard, Philly Joe Jones, Johnny Griffin and Kenny Clarke.

== Teaching ==
Grigson was for ten years (1983–93) Professor of Harmony and Improvisation at London's Guildhall School of Music and taught on the school's Postgraduate Diploma Course in Jazz. Many notable musicians studied at the Guildhall School under Grigson's tenure there, including Rowland Sutherland, Huw Warren, Steve Williamson, Courtney Pine, Jason Rebello, Gerard Presencer, Phil Bent, Mornington Lockett, Cleveland Watkiss, Tom Norris and others.

Cleveland Watkiss has recalled his introduction to the jazz course initiated by Grigson: "He was the head of this academy at the Guildhall... and they were recruiting and looking for kids to join. At that time you could get grants and stuff like that. Anyway I went for the audition and I remember Lionel Grigson saying to me after I did the audition, 'We need people like you here!' That was my introduction to the Guildhall. He said that to me, 'We need people like you in here!' I was like, 'Okay.' So anyway, I’m in the Guildhall – Alan Weeks is in the Guildhall, Michael Martin’s is in the Guildhall, Winston Clifford’s in the Guildhall, Jason Rebello’s in the Guildhall, Julie Dennis in the Guildhall, Frances Knight, Paul Hunt… The whole army of young musicians starting to come to the Guildhall. Lionel Grigson just created a space and said, 'Brothers, come on! We need you in here!' So Monday morning you’d go to the Guildhall and you’d stand in the foyer – blacker than black! I don’t think the Guildhall has ever been so 'blacked' out before or since. We’re talking mid-eighties.... Everyone came to the Guildhall, because we were all there, it was like a meeting place."

Grigson invited other musicians to coach on his course, including American saxophonist Jean Toussaint in 1987.

== Writings ==
Grigson was the author of a number of publications, including A Jazz Chord Book (first published in 1981, and since twice reprinted), Practical Jazz (1988), Jazz from Scratch (1991), as well as studies of the music of Charlie Parker, Louis Armstrong and Thelonious Monk. Grigson's A Thelonious Monk Study Album is listed among 224 books in the library of David Byrne.

== Discography ==
- 1965: Western Reunion - New Jazz Orchestra (14 March 1965 - Decca LK4690): Neil Ardley; Bob Leaper, Mike Phillipson, and Tony Dudley on trumpets; Ian Carr on trumpet and flugelhorn; Mick Palmer on French horn; John Mumford and Paul Rutherford on trombones; Peter Harvey on bass trombone; Dick Hart on tuba; Les Carter on flutes; Trevor Watts on alto sax and flute; Barbara Thompson on alto sax; Dave Gelly and Tom Harris on tenor saxophones; Sebastian Freudenberg on baritone sax; Mike Barrett on piano; Tony Reeves on bass; Jon Hiseman on drums; and Lionel Grigson on piano and arranger of track 5, "If You Could See Me Now".
- 1973: Grigson's group Ujamaa issued a 7-inch single, on the A-side of which was the Grigson/Busby composition "Add Up the Score", featuring singer Jeanette Tavernier and guitarist Jocelyn Pitchen, and on the B-side "Ten-Bar Grit".

== Publications ==
- A Jazz Chord Book: Over 350 Standard and Original Sequences (1981; Jazzwise, 3rd edition 1995)
- Wonders of the World (foreword by Cliff Michelmore; Newnes, 1985)
- Practical Jazz: A Step-by-step Guide to Harmony and Improvisation (London: Stainer & Bell, 1988; ISBN 978-0852496688)
- A Charlie Parker Study Album (Novello, 1989); ISBN 978-0853601401
- Jazz from Scratch: How to improvise on great jazz classics (with a foreword by Miles Kington; London: Faber, 1991; ISBN 978-0571511945)
- A Louis Armstrong Study Album (Novello, 1992; ISBN 978-0853601500)
- A Thelonious Monk Study Album (Novello, 1993)
