= A-Pucikwar =

A-Pucikwar may refer to:

- The A-Pucikwar people
- The A-Pucikwar language
