= Banksy Limitless =

Art exhibition in London, 2025–2026

Coordinates: 51.4928°N 0.1765°W

Banksy Limitless is a gallery exhibition at 79-85 Old Brompton Road in South Kensington, London. It is curated by Sorina Burlacu and was not officially endorsed by Banksy.

The exhibition included on display 250 works, both recreations and originals by Banksy, making it one of the largest Banksy collections at the time. The exhibition included "immersive experiences" such as holography.

For those who visited the gallery it was a generally positively acknowledged exhibition although it also received criticism for decontextualising Banksy's artwork, particularly given his background as a street artist. The curator has stated that the exhibition's aims included presenting Banksy's works in a way that gave light to his philosophy and approach.

The exhibition is set to run from September 2025 to January 2026.
