= David "Happy" Williams =

Trinidadian jazz double-bassist (born 1946)

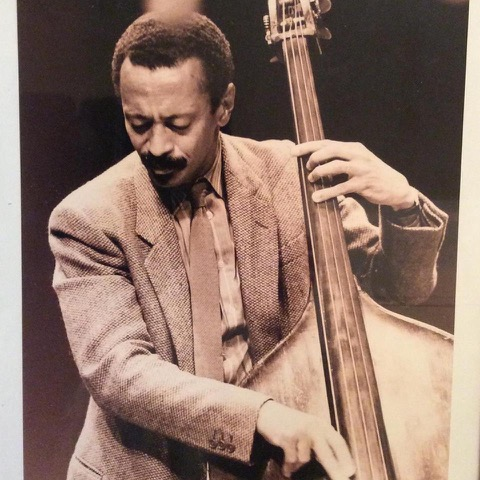
- Williams in 1971

Background information
- Also known as: Happy Williams
- Born: David Larry Williams; September 17, 1946 (age 80); Woodbrook, Port of Spain, Trinidad
- Education: London College of Music
- Genres: Jazz; pan jazz
- Occupation: Jazz double-bassist
- Instrument: Double bass
- Website: davidhappywilliams.com

David "Happy" Williams (born 17 September 1946) is a US-based Trinidadian jazz double-bassist, who was a long-time member of Cedar Walton's group. Williams has also worked with many other notable musicians, including Woody Shaw, Bobby Hutcherson, Stan Getz, Kenny Barron, Duke Jordan, Monty Alexander, Frank Morgan, Hank Jones, Charles McPherson, Larry Willis, George Cables, Abdullah Ibrahim, David "Fathead" Newman, Sonny Fortune, John Hicks, Louis Hayes, Jackie McLean, Clifford Jordan, Abbey Lincoln, Ernestine Anderson, and Kathleen Battle.

== Background and career ==
David Larry Williams was born in Woodbrook, Port of Spain, Trinidad. His father, John "Buddy" Williams, was a bass player and one of Trinidad's best-known bandleaders of the 1940s and 1950s. David started playing music at the age of five, initially on piano, then violin and steelpan. He attended Tranquillity Boys School, Port of Spain, and at the age of 12 began playing bass in earnest. As a teenager, he played pan in the Invaders steelband. When his sister went to London on scholarship to study piano, David joined her there in 1962, studying bass for a year at the London College of Music. He recalls, "I started getting offers and gigs, I was working in nightclubs, you know, wherever I could play, pubs, it didn't matter, and I had this desire, this thing to just get out there and play." Among the London venues where he played was The Troubadour in Old Brompton Road, in a group with Lionel Grigson, Spike Wells and others.

Williams went to New York City in 1969 on what was intended to be a two-week visit but decided to stay on when he was offered work after sitting in on a gig with Beaver Harris featuring Grachan Moncur in place of Jimmy Garrison. Following leads from Ron Carter, Williams began working with Gap and Chuck Mangione, and then went to Washington, DC, where he became Roberta Flack's bass player for two years, also working with Donny Hathaway during that time. Musicians with whom Williams played in the 1970s included alto saxophonists Ornette Coleman and Charles McPherson, pianists Billy Taylor, Kenny Barron, and Duke Jordan, drummer Elvin Jones, and tenor saxophonists Archie Shepp and George Adams.

Williams' first album as a leader, Soul is Free, was released in 1979; one of the compositions from it, "Out of the Sheets, Into the Streets", was used in the 1983 Eddie Murphy film Trading Places.

In 1982, Williams became a member of the Cedar Walton Trio alongside Billy Higgins (whom Williams first met around 1973), on the death of Sam Jones, for whom he had occasionally subbed. They became, in the words of Jazz Journal: "One of the most regarded trios in contemporary acoustic Jazz".

In more recent years, Williams has also written and recorded music inspired by Trinidadian steelpan and calypso, notably the "pan jazz" album Reid, Wright and be Happy (2003), alongside Ron Reid and Orville Wright.

== Discography ==
=== As leader ===
- Soul is Free (AVI Records, 1978)
- Up Front (Timeless, 1986)
- Duo (Red, 1990) with Cedar Walton [originally released as Off Minor]
- Rhythm of the Street (Rots Records, 2000)
- Ping Pong Obsession (Rots Records, 2001)
- The Prize (Rots Records, 2002)
- The Spirit (Rots Records, 2003)
- Reid, Wright and Be Happy (Sanch, 2003)
- The Message (Rots Records, 2004)
- Move Your Furniture (Rots Records, 2004)
- The Licentious Hour (Rots Records, 2005)
- Feel the Passion (featuring Frankie McIntosh; 2010)

=== As sideman ===
With Herb Alpert and Hugh Masekela

- Main Event Live (A&M, 1978)

With Kenny Barron

- Peruvian Blue (Muse, 1974)
- Invitation (Criss Cross Jazz, 1991)
- Quickstep (Enja, 1991)

With David Benoit

- Heavier Than Yesterday (AVI, 1977)

With The Blackbyrds

- The Blackbyrds (Fantasy, 1973)

With George Cables

- Old Wine New Bottles (Atlas, 1982)
- Wonderful L. A. (Atlas, 1982)

With Michael Carvin

- Revelation (Muse, 1991)
- Each One Teach One (Muse, 1994)

With Cyrus Chestnut

- A Million Colors in Your Mind (HighNote, 2015)

With Freddy Cole

- Love Makes the Changes (Fantasy, 1998)

With Charles Davis

- Ingia! (Strata-East, 1974)

With Roberta Flack

- Children of The Night (Atlantic, 1970)

With Sonny Fortune

- Monk's Mood (Kennox, 1993)

With Steve Grossman

- Love is The Thing (Red Records, 1986)
- A Small Hotel (Dreyfus Jazz, 1993)

With Slide Hampton

- Roots (Criss Cross, 1985)

With Louis Hayes

- Breath of Life (Muse, 1974)

With David Hazeltine

- Modern Standards (Sharp Nine, 2005)

With Billy Higgins

- Billy Higgins Quintet (Sweet Basil, 1993)

With Terumasa Hino

- Blue Smiles (Something Else, 1992)

With Freddie Hubbard

- Bolivia (Music Masters, 1991)

With Abdullah Ibrahim

- Water From an Ancient Well (Tiptoe, 1986)
- Mindif (Enja, 1988)

With Jermaine Jackson

- Jermaine (Motown, 1980)

With Elvin Jones

- The Main Force (Vanguard, 1974)
- New Agenda (Vanguard, 1975)

With Sam Jones

- Cello Again (Xanadu, 1975)

With Clifford Jordan

- Down Through the Years (Milestone, 1991)

With Duke Jordan

- Murray Hill Caper (Spotlite, 1973)

With Joyce

- Language and Love (Polygram, 1991)

With David Lasley

- Missin' Twenty Grand (EMI, 1982)

With Liberace

- My Friends Call Me Lee (AVI, 1978)

With Warne Marsh

- Back Home (Criss Cross Jazz, 1986)

With Jackie McLean

- Nature Boy (Something Else, 1999)

With Charles McPherson

- But Beautiful (Venus Records, 2003)

With James Moody, Clark Terry and Elvin Jones

- Summit Meeting (Vanguard, 1977)

With Frank Morgan

- A Lovesome Thing (Antilles, 1991)

With David "Fathead" Newman

- Heads Up (Atlantic, 1987)
- Fire! Live at the Village Vanguard (Atlantic, 1989)
- Davey Blue (HighNote, 2002)

With One for All

- Killer Joe (Venus, 2005)

With Art Pepper

- The Trip (Contemporary, 1976)
- Art Pepper with Duke Jordan in Copenhagen 1981 (Galaxy, 1981 [1996]) with Duke Jordan
- Roadgame (Galaxy, 1981 [1982])
- Art Lives (Galaxy 1981 [1983])
- APQ (Galaxy, 1981 [1984])
- Arthur's Blues (Galaxy, 1981 [1991])
- Unreleased Art, Vol. 1:The Complete Abashiri Concert - November 22, 1981 (Widows Taste, 1981 [2006])
- Final Art: Art Pepper Last Concert 1982 (Tofrec, 1982 [1991])

With Dave Pike

- Pike's Groove (Criss Cross Jazz, 1986) with Cedar Walton

With Ernest Ranglin

- Memories of Barber Mack (Island, 1997)

With Vanessa Rubin

- Girl Talk (Telarc, 1999)

With Janis Siegel

- I Wish You Love (Telarc, 2002)

With the Voices of East Harlem

- Live (Just Sun, 1973)
- Can You Feel It (1974)

With Cedar Walton

- The Maestro (Muse, 1981)
- Eastern Rebellion 4 (Timeless, 1984)
- Cedar's Blues (Red, 1985)
- The Trio 1 (Red, 1985)
- The Trio 2 (Red, 1985)
- The Trio 3 (Red, 1985)
- Cedar Walton (Timeless, 1985)
- Bluesville Time (Criss Cross, 1985)
- As Long as There's Music (Muse, 1990 [1993])
- Mosaic (Music Masters, 1990 [1992]) as Eastern Rebellion
- Simple Pleasure (Music Masters, 1993) as Eastern Rebellion
- You're My Everything (Sweet Basil, 1993)
- Art Blakey Legacy (Sweet Basil, 1993)
- Live at the Village Vanguard (Music Masters, 1994) - as Eastern Rebellion
- Never Let Me Go (Sweet Basil, 1994)
- Manhattan Afternoon (Criss Cross, 1994)
- Sweet Basil Trio (Sweet Basil, 1995)
- Iron Clad (Monarch, 1995)
- The Promise Land (HighNote, 2001)
- Midnight Waltz (Venus, 2005)
- One Flight Down (HighNote, 2006)
- The Bouncer (HighNote, 2011)

With Larry Willis

- How Do You Keep the Music Playing? (SteepleChase, 1992)
- A Tribute to Someone (AudioQuest, 1994)
