= Troubadour (London nightclub) =

Nightclub in Earls Court, London

- Exterior of the Troubadour in 2009
- Interactive map of Troubadour
- Location: 265 Old Brompton Road, Royal Borough of Kensington and Chelsea; London, SW59JA; United Kingdom
- Coordinates: 51.4888°N 0.1917°W
- Owner: Giles McNamee
- Seating type: sitting and standing
- Capacity: 120
- Type: Nightclub, Coffee house and Music Venue
- Events: Folk; rock; jazz; reggae; world; singer-songwriters; pop; experimental
- Public transit: Earl's Court

Construction
- Groundbreaking: 1954 but rumour has it as a music club and meeting place even earlier
- Opened: 1954; 72 years ago

Website
- www.troubadourlondon.com

The Troubadour is a nightclub, restaurant and pub located at 265 Old Brompton Road, Earls Court, London. Established in 1954, it is one of the oldest and last remaining nightclubs and coffee houses of its era in London. It still offers live music seven days a week.

== Financial troubles ==
The Troubadour was in danger of closure due to financial difficulties after being served with a noise abatement notice in 2012, related to use of the garden. In 2015, ownership was taken over by shareholder Giles McNamee, who has indicated there will be future investments to keep the club open.

== Ownership ==
The Troubadour has had four proprietors since its opening:

- 1954–72, Michael Van Bloemen and Sheila Van Bloemen, founders of the venue
- 1972–98, Bruce Rogerson
- 1998–2015, Simon Thornhill and Susie Thornhill.
- 2015–present, Giles McNamee

== Artists ==
The club has played host to a number of major artists in various stages of their careers. Among these have been:

- Richard Harris – in early 1956 where he auditioned and rehearsed his own production of the Clifford Odets play Winter Journey (The Country Girl) while studying at the then nearby London Academy of Music and Dramatic Art (LAMDA). Richard Harris fell in love with his wife Elizabeth here as well. A newspaper review of the time
- Charlie Watts – in summer 1961,
- Bob Dylan – Christmas 1962, performing under the name Blind Boy Grunt.
- Paul Simon - Played on 9 June 1964 at Troubadour
- Joni Mitchell – played there in 1970
- Robert Plant – although Led Zeppelin had no official dates at the Troubadour
- Lionel Grigson, along with other jazz musicians – including Spike Wells, Mick Pyne, Dave Gelly, Daryl Runswick, and Happy Williams – played regular Sunday afternoon gigs in the 1960s.
- Sandy Denny, who was the subject of a 2008 tribute show held at the venue.
- Martin Carthy – an influential figure in British traditional music
- Davey Graham – an influential figure in the 1960s folk music revolution in England
