= Bute Street =

Bute Street may refer to:

- Bute Street, Cardiff
- Bute Street, Hong Kong
- Bute Street, London
- Luton Bute Street railway station
