= Roli Okorodudu =

English actress (1964-)

- Born: 17 June 1964; Epsom, England, United Kingdom
- Occupation: actress
- Spouse: Graeme Edler (died 2004)
- Children: 2

Roli Okorodudu is an English actress and playwright.

== Early life ==
Okorodudu was born in Epsom, Surrey, on June 17, 1964.

== Career ==
Okorodudu has had minor roles in various TV series, including as a primary school teacher in one episode of One Foot In The Grave and an AA Chairperson in two episodes of Slow Horses.

Since 2019 Okorodudu has worked as a playwright, two of which won The London Playwright competitions . Her first full-length play, Holiday, was performed by Fish and Bicycle Theatre at the Drayton Arms in 2025, and was described as a farce full of zingers by one reviewer, although it also "scratched the surface of something interesting, considered digging deeper, but then shied away into the next sex joke instead". Holiday is about three mums at a 2009 holiday camp, and was praised for its wit, but also criticised for its turn into absurdity.

== Personal life ==
Okorodudu's husband, Graeme Edler, who was also an actor, died unexpectedly on February 10, 2004. Roli has two daughters and a son, named Celeste Joni-Lulu and Graydyn. .

== Filmography ==
- Slow Horses (2022)
- Big Boys Don't Cry (2020)
- Trauma (2018)
- Drifters (2016)
- Trying Again (2014)
- My Life in Film (2004)
- Casualty (2005)
- The Bill (1999-2001)
- Doctors (2001)
- Stayling Alive (1997)
- Family Money (1996)
- One Foot In The Grave (1996)
- Cardiac Arrest (1996)
- The Demon Headmaster (1996)
- Class Act (1995)
