= Duo (Cedar Walton and David Williams album) =

Studio album by Cedar Walton and David Williams
- Released: 1991
- Recorded: May 18, 1990
- Studio: Studio A, Pordenone, Italy
- Genre: Jazz
- Length: 76:24
- Label: Red; 123 242
- Producer: Alberto Alberti

Cedar Walton chronology
| Cedar Walton Plays (1986) | Duo (1991) | As Long as There's Music (1990) |

David Williams chronology
| Up Front (1986) | Duo (1990) | Rhythm of the Street (2000) |

Off Minor Cover

Duo is an album by pianist Cedar Walton and bassist David Williams which was recorded in Italy 1990 and originally released on the Italian Red label. The album was first released as Off Minor due to a mistake incorrectly identifying the track "I Mean You" as another Thelonious Monk tune and as a result, the title and jacket were changed but the recorded contents remained the same.

== Reception ==
Professional ratings
Review scores
| Source | Rating |
|---|---|
| AllMusic | 3/5 stars |

The review on AllMusic states "One of Cedar Walton's best recordings ... The communication between Walton and Williams is superb."

== Track listing ==
All compositions by Cedar Walton except where noted

1. "I Mean You" (Thelonious Monk) – 5:24 Incorrectly identified as "Off Minor" on original release
2. "Pannonica" (Monk) – 5:43
3. "Stablemates" (Benny Golson) – 6:21
4. "Lament" (J. J. Johnson) – 9:46
5. "N.P.S." – 6:13
6. "My Old Flame" (Arthur Johnston, Sam Coslow) – 6:56
7. "St. Thomas" (Sonny Rollins) – 5:42
8. "Hagy" – 10:38
9. "Blues for Alberto" – 6:40
10. "I've Grown Accustomed to Your Face" (Frederick Loewe, Alan Jay Lerner) – 5:10
11. "Ruby, My Dear" (Monk) – 7:51

== Personnel ==
- Cedar Walton – piano
- David Williams – bass
- Gaspare Pasini – alto saxophone (track 11)
