= The Promise Land =

Studio album by Cedar Walton
- Released: August 28, 2001
- Recorded: March 29, 2001
- Studio: Van Gelder Studio, Englewood Cliffs, NJ
- Genre: Jazz
- Length: 57:35
- Label: HighNote; HCD 7081
- Producer: Don Sickler

Cedar Walton chronology
Roots (1997)	The Promise Land (2001)	Latin Tinge (2002)

The Promise Land is an album by pianist Cedar Walton which was recorded in 2001 and released on the Highnote label.

== Reception ==
Allmusic reviewed the album stating "Top-notch hard bop is performed by pianist Cedar Walton's quartet... Easily recommended for fans of modern straight-ahead jazz". All About Jazz observed "Walton's joyous musical spirit is candidly articulated on The Promise Land". JazzTimes said "everything seems to fall comfortably into place".

Professional ratings
Review scores
Source	Rating
Allmusic	4/5 stars
The Penguin Guide to Jazz Recordings	3.5/4 stars

== Track listing ==
All compositions by Cedar Walton except where noted

1. "Promise Land" - 5:14
2. "N.P.S." - 6:44
3. "Back to Bologna" - 5:19
4. "Body and Soul" (Frank Eyton, Johnny Green, Edward Heyman, Robert Sour) - 8:56
5. "Darn That Dream" (Eddie DeLange, Jimmy Van Heusen) - 5:33
6. "Thirty Degrees to the Wind" - 7:30
7. "Smoke Gets in Your Eyes" (Otto Harbach, Jerome Kern) - 6:26
8. "I'll Know" (Frank Loesser) - 6:25
9. "Bremond's Blues" - 5:28

== Personnel ==
- Cedar Walton - piano
- Vincent Herring - alto saxophone, flute
- David Williams - bass
- Kenny Washington - drums

=== Production ===
- Don Sickler - producer
- Rudy Van Gelder - engineer
