= Art 'n' Zoot =

Live album by Art Pepper and Zoot Sims
- Released: 1995
- Recorded: September 27, 1981
- Venue: Royce Hall, University of California, Los Angeles, CA
- Genre: Jazz
- Length: 53:59
- Label: Pablo; PACD-2310-957-2
- Producer: Tim Owens

Art Pepper chronology
Arthur's Blues (1981)	Art 'n' Zoot (1995)	Darn That Dream (1982)

Zoot Sims chronology
I Wish I Were Twins (1981)	Art 'n' Zoot (1981)	Blues for Two (1982)

Art 'n' Zoot (subtitled Their Only Concert Together) is a live album by saxophonists Art Pepper and Zoot Sims recorded in 1981 at Royce Hall in Los Angeles and released on the Pablo label in 1995.

== Reception ==
Professional ratings
Review scores
Source	Rating
AllMusic	3/5 stars
The Penguin Guide to Jazz Recordings	3/4 stars

The AllMusic review stated " it is a joy to hear this rare encounter by the two great saxophonists. It is only a pity that Pepper and Sims did not record together more extensively during their careers".

== Track listing ==
1. "Wee (Allen's Alley)" (Denzil Best) - 7:39
2. "Over the Rainbow" (Harold Arlen, Yip Harburg) - 10:28
3. "In the Middle of a Kiss" (Sam Coslow) - 8:51
4. "Broadway" (Wilbur H Bird, Teddy McRae, Henri Woode) - 6:29
5. "The Girl from Ipanema" (Antônio Carlos Jobim, Vinícius de Moraes, Norman Gimbel) - 10:31
6. "Breakdown Blues" (Art Pepper, Zoot Sims) - 10:01

== Personnel ==
- Art Pepper - alto saxophone (tracks 1, 2 & 6)
- Zoot Sims - tenor saxophone (tracks 1 & 3–6)
- Victor Feldman - piano
- Barney Kessel - guitar (tracks 4 & 5)
- Ray Brown (tracks 1 & 3–6), Charlie Haden (track 2) - bass
- Billy Higgins - drums
