= Simple Pleasure (Eastern Rebellion album) =

Studio album by Eastern Rebellion
- Released: 1993
- Recorded: June 6 & 7, 1992
- Studio: Crystal Studios, Hollywood, CA
- Genre: Jazz
- Length: 56:18
- Label: MusicMasters; 65081-2
- Producer: Baratz & Browne, Inc.

Eastern Rebellion chronology
Mosaic (1992)	Simple Pleasure (1993)	Just One of Those... Nights at the Village Vanguard (1994)

Cedar Walton chronology
Cedar Walton at Maybeck (1992)	Simple Pleasure (1993)	Manhattan Afternoon (1994)

Simple Pleasure is an album by Eastern Rebellion, led by pianist Cedar Walton, recorded in 1992 and released by the MusicMasters label.

Professional ratings
Review scores
Source	Rating
AllMusic	3/5 stars

== Track listing ==
All compositions by Cedar Walton except where noted

1. "In the Kitchen" – 5:29
2. "Roni's Decision" – 7:18
3. "Dear Ruth" – 6:35
4. "Simple Pleasure" – 6:09
5. "Sixth Avenue" – 5:23
6. "My Ideal" (Leo Robin, Newell Chase, Richard A. Whiting) – 7:17
7. "All The Things You Are" (Jerome Kern, Oscar Hammerstein II) – 6:23
8. "My Man's Gone Now" (George Gershwin, DuBose Heyward) – 7:02
9. "Theme for Ernie" (Fred Lacey) – 4:30

== Personnel ==
- Cedar Walton – piano
- Ralph Moore – tenor saxophone
- David Williams – bass
- Billy Higgins – drums
