= Cedar Walton at Maybeck =

Live album by Cedar Walton
- Released: March 1993
- Recorded: 1992
- Venue: Maybeck Recital Hall, Berkeley, California
- Genre: Jazz
- Label: Concord

Cedar Walton chronology
Mosaic (1990)	Cedar Walton at Maybeck (1992)	Simple Pleasure (1992)

Cedar Walton at Maybeck: Maybeck Recital Hall Series Volume Twenty-Five is an album of solo piano performances by jazz pianist Cedar Walton.

== Music and recording ==
The album was recorded at the Maybeck Recital Hall in Berkeley, California. Walton plays some standards and two of his own compositions. He commented that, "The hall is unique, with two Yamahas that are kept in top shape, and an intimate ambiance. I thought I'd relax and warm up in front of the audience by just playing the blues."

== Release and reception ==
Professional ratings
Review scores
Source	Rating
AllMusic	4/5 stars
The Penguin Guide to Jazz	3/4 stars

The album was released by Concord Records in 1993. The AllMusic reviewer commented: "Walton remains a strong hard bopper with his right hand, a manner that takes very well to the characteristically bright, crisp tone of the hall's Yamaha pianos; but he also displays as fully equipped a harmonic arsenal as that of anyone." The Chicago Tribune reviewer wrote of the "dazzling clarity to his musical expression".

== Track listing ==
1. "The Maybeck Blues"
2. "Stella by Starlight"
3. "Sweet Lorraine"
4. "Darn That Dream"
5. "Zingaro/Caminhos Cruzados"
6. "Bremond's Blues"
7. "You're My Everything"
8. "The Meaning of the Blues"
9. "I'm Old Fashioned"
10. "I Didn't Know What Time It Was"
11. "Just One of Those Things"

== Personnel ==
- Cedar Walton – piano
