= Tom Norris (musician) =

- Also known as: Gaiga
- Genres: Classical; Soundtracks; Popular music Electronic music
- Occupations: Musician singer composer/arranger
- Instruments: Violin viola guitar
- Label: Various

Tom Norris (born 1971) is an English violinist, violist, composer and songwriter whose career bridges the concert hall, the recording studio and the screen. A long-standing member of the London Symphony Orchestra, Norris has also forged a distinctive voice as a singer-songwriter and film composer, and, under the artist name Gaiga, as an electronic composer and producer.

== Life ==
Tom Norris was born in Kent and attended Chetham's School of Music as a child. Later he studied at the Guildhall School of Music and Drama in London, and began singing and playing in local clubs as a jazz violinist with musicians including Lionel Grigson. After finishing school, he played as an extra with the London Symphony Orchestra, began to write songs and toured in a piano trio with Norbert Zehm and Kate Shortt. He continued his studies at Banff Centre for the Arts in Alberta, Canada, and then took a position for two years as Principal Second Violinist with the Winnipeg Symphony Orchestra. He returned to London for a position with the London Symphony Orchestra, where he plays Co-Principal Second Violin.

Norris has worked with a broad range of musical acts including The Who, Eric Clapton, Antony and the Johnsons, John Adams, Deep Purple, Manu Delago, Seal, Dave Brubeck, Elvis Costello, Daniel Barenboim, Bernard Haitink and Pierre Boulez. In March 2010, Norris played violin for The Who's production of Quadrophenia at the Royal Albert Hall in London as a tenth anniversary charity benefit for the Teenage Cancer Trust. On 3 July 2010, he performed as the opening act for Eric Clapton at DTE Energy music theatre.

Norris leads the Vuillaume Quartet, formed in 2001 for the London Symphony Orchestra's Discovery program. In August 2010, his classical ensemble The Puertas Quartet reached the semi-finals of the Bordeaux International String Quartet Competition.

== Discography ==
Norris maintains a broad discography, having appeared on numerous CDs as a musician, composer and/or ensemble leader. In 2010 he debuted as a solo recording artist, issuing his first popular music CD, Edge of the World.

Other credits include:

- Various Artists, Radio Disney Jams, Vol. 12, composer
- Various Artists, Family Jams, Vol. 3, composer
- RPWL, Gentle Art of Music, String Arrangements
- RPWL, Gentle Art of Music, Viola
- Various Artists, It's Teen Disney, composer
- RPWL, Gentle Art of Music, Violin
- Escala, Escala, Violin
- Declan, Declan, leader
- Johan de Meij, Johan de Meij: Symphony No. 1 "Lord of the Rings", Violin
- Mannheim Steamroller, Fresh Aire Collector's Box, Vol. 1–8, Violin
- Mannheim Steamroller, Fresh Aire 8, Violin
- Various Artists, Music of Hope, Violin
- Chris Brubeck, Bach to Brubeck: Bass Trombone Concerto/Blues Suite for Banjo & Orchestra, Violin
- Nanci Griffith, Dust Bowl Symphony, Violin
- Shinjuku Thief, Witch Hammer, Feedback
