= Underground Memoirs =

Studio album by Cedar Walton
- Released: May 24, 2005
- Recorded: January 11, 2005; The Studio, NYC
- Genre: Jazz
- Length: 53:43
- Label: HighNote; HCD 7119
- Producer: Don Sickler & Cedar Walton

Cedar Walton chronology
Latin Tinge (2002)	Underground Memoirs (2005)	Midnight Waltz (2005)

Underground Memoirs is a solo album by pianist Cedar Walton which was recorded in 2005 and released on the Highnote label.

== Reception ==
Allmusic reviewed the album stating "His Underground Memoirs are recommended for restful contemplation, intimate dining, and relaxed conversation among friends". All About Jazz observed "Underground Memoirs offers an opportunity to hear him in that most exposed of contexts. The result is just under an hour's worth of nuanced reinvention and reverent reimagining".

Professional ratings
Review scores
Source	Rating
Allmusic	3.5/5 stars
All About Jazz	3.5/5 stars
The Penguin Guide to Jazz Recordings	3/4 stars

== Track listing ==
1. "Milestones" (Miles Davis) - 4:26
2. "Lost April" (Eddie DeLange) - 6:50
3. "Someday My Prince Will Come" (Frank Churchill, Larry Morey) - 4:38
4. "Con Alma" (Dizzy Gillespie) - 4:06
5. "Skylark" (Hoagy Carmichael, Johnny Mercer) - 4:50
6. "Everytime We Say Goodbye" (Cole Porter) - 6:25
7. "On Green Dolphin Street" (Bronisław Kaper, Ned Washington) - 5:55
8. "Underground Memoirs" (Cedar Walton) - 5:53
9. "Sophisticated Lady"(Duke Ellington, Irving Mills, Mitchell Parish) - 5:46
10. "I Want to Talk About You" (Billy Eckstine) - 4:54

== Personnel ==
- Cedar Walton - piano
