= Zetland Arms =

Pub in London

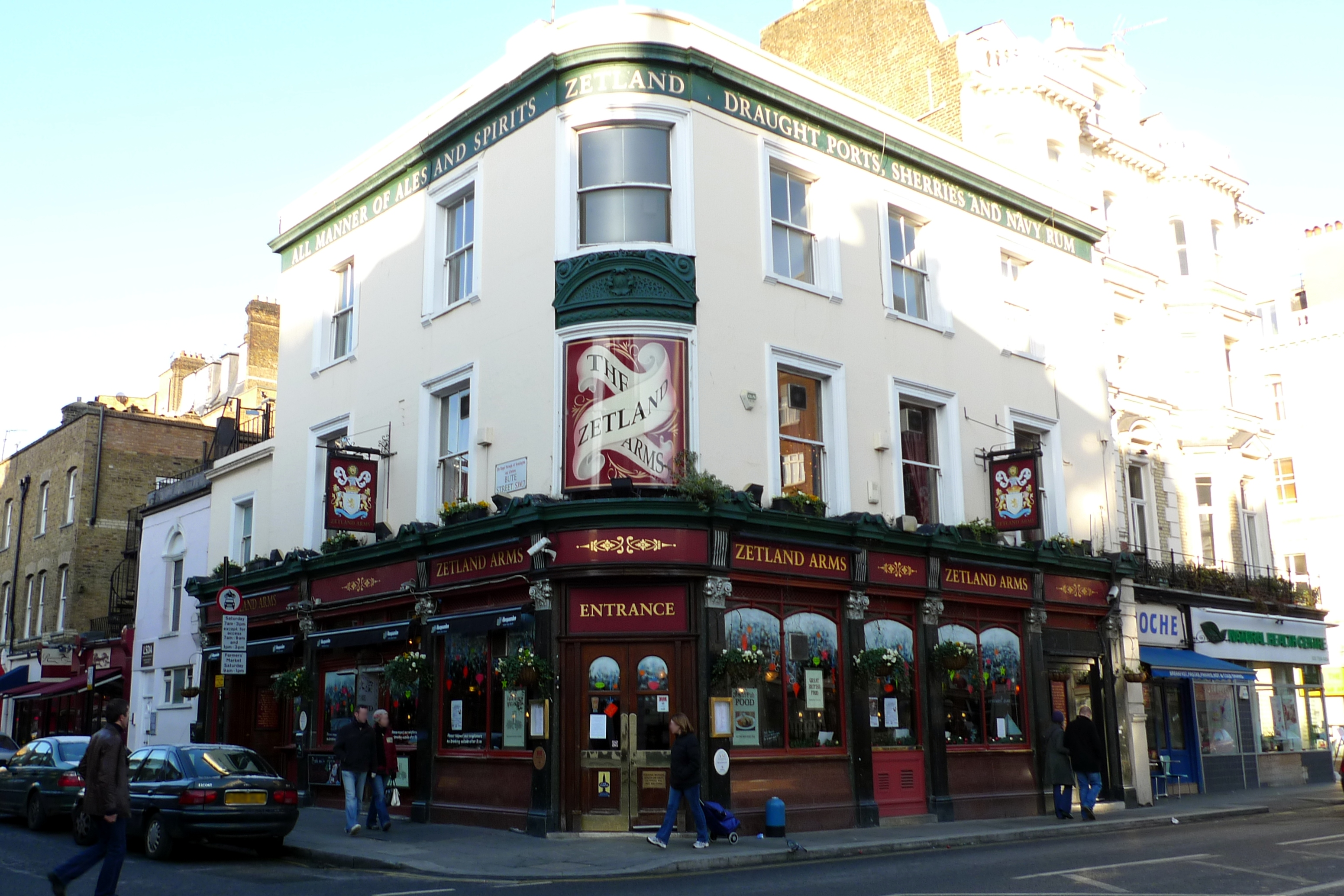
- Zetland Arms

- Location within Royal Borough of Kensington and Chelsea Location within Greater London

General information
- Location: corner of Old Brompton Road and Bute Street, London, England
- Coordinates: 51.493384°N 0.175891°W

The Zetland Arms is a pub in South Kensington, London, at 2 Bute Street, on the corner of Old Brompton Road.

It dates from the mid-1840s. The pub is one of the few surviving original buildings from when this area was first developed. In 1875, there was a brawl at the pub which started with insults about the Devonshire origin of some drinkers. A policeman ejected about a dozen people who continued fighting in the street, which resulted in a death from a fractured skull.

It is claimed by the current owners, the pub chain Taylor Walker, that Charlie Chaplin bought the pub for his brother Marlon and his mother. On pubshistory.com, it is noted that "According to the pub sign, the 1880 landlord Sid Chaplin was the older half brother of Charlie Chaplin the film star", and the 1880 Post Office Directory confirms that a Sid Chaplin was landlord in 1880.
