= Latin Tinge =

Studio album by Cedar Walton
- Released: October 15, 2002
- Recorded: June 21, 2002
- Studio: Van Gelder Studio, Englewood Cliffs, NJ
- Genre: Jazz
- Length: 53:35
- Label: HighNote; HCD 7099
- Producer: Don Sickler & Cedar Walton

Cedar Walton chronology
| The Promise Land (2001) | Latin Tinge (2002) | Underground Memoirs (2005) |

Latin Tinge is an album by pianist Cedar Walton which was recorded in 2002 and released on the Highnote label.

== Reception ==
Allmusic reviewed the album stating "A solid but not outstanding Latin jazz session... Low-key without being low-energy, Latin Tinge fulfills the minor goals it sets for itself". All About Jazz observed "It's jazz by the numbers, played with metronomic regularity, simmering but never boiling over, smoldering but never burning". JazzTimes said "There is more than a tinge of Latin music here; the title could have justifiably been Latin Immersion. The emphasis of the trio is on adhering to proper Latin rhythmic arrangements. Walton's playing is therefore not as florid as we are used to getting from him; he seems to be more concerned with locking in with the rhythm section than in flying above it".

Professional ratings
Review scores
| Source | Rating |
|---|---|
| Allmusic | 3/5 stars |
| The Penguin Guide to Jazz Recordings | 3/4 stars |

== Track listing ==
All compositions by Cedar Walton except where noted

1. "Brazil" (Ary Barroso) - 7:04
2. "Latin America" - 6:14
3. "Triste" (Antônio Carlos Jobim) - 4:53
4. "Tres Palabras" (Osvaldo Farrés) - 5:55
5. "Perfidia" (Alberto Domínguez) - 5:39
6. "The Vision" - 6:31
7. "Bésame Mucho" (Consuelo Velázquez) - 7:56
8. "Serenata" (Leroy Anderson) - 5:30
9. "Latino Blue" - 3:53

== Personnel ==
- Cedar Walton - piano
- Cucho Martinez - bass
- Ray Mantilla - percussion

=== Production ===
- Don Sickler - producer
- Rudy Van Gelder - engineer
