= Eastern Rebellion 4 =

Studio album by Eastern Rebellion
- Released: 1984
- Recorded: May 25, 1983
- Studio: Studio 44, Monster, Netherlands
- Genre: Jazz
- Length: 37:04
- Label: Timeless; SJP 184
- Producer: Wim Wigt

Eastern Rebellion chronology
Eastern Rebellion 3 (1980)	Eastern Rebellion 4 (1984)	Mosaic (1992)

Cedar Walton chronology
Timeless Heart (1983)	Eastern Rebellion 4 (1983)	The All American Trio (1983)

Eastern Rebellion 4 is an album by Eastern Rebellion led by pianist Cedar Walton which was recorded in 1983 and released on the Dutch Timeless label.

== Reception ==
Professional ratings
Review scores
Source	Rating
AllMusic	3/5 stars
The Penguin Guide to Jazz	3.5/4 stars

Scott Yanow of AllMusic notes, "The sextet performs four standards and a pair of Walton originals but not much magic occurs during this workmanlike performance". The Penguin Guide to Jazz compared the album unfavorably with earlier Eastern Rebellion releases, and criticized Armenteros's solo development.

== Track listing ==
All compositions by Cedar Walton except where noted

1. "Manteca" (Dizzy Gillespie, Gil Fuller, Chano Pozo) – 7:17
2. "Close Enough for Love" (Johnny Mandel, aul Williams) – 6:30
3. "St. Thomas" (Sonny Rollins) – 4:08
4. "I Am Not Sure" – 6:40
5. "Epistrophy" (Thelonious Monk) – 7:34
6. "Groundwork" – 4:55

== Personnel ==
- Cedar Walton – piano
- Curtis Fuller – trombone
- Bob Berg – tenor saxophone
- Alfredo "Chocolate" Armenteros – trumpet
- David Williams – bass
- Billy Higgins – drums
