= Up Front (album) =

Studio album by Cedar Walton, David Williams & Billy Higgins
- Released: 1987
- Recorded: October 1986; Studio 44, Monster, Netherlands
- Genre: Jazz
- Label: Timeless; SJP 240
- Producer: Wim Wigt

Cedar Walton chronology
Blues for Myself (1986)	Up Front (1987)	Cedar Walton Plays (1986)

David Williams chronology
Soul is Free (1978)	Up Front (1986)	Duo (1990)

Up Front is an album led by bassist David Williams but often credited to pianist Cedar Walton. Walton and Williams, along with drummer Billy Higgins, performed as a long-running trio under Walton's name. The album was recorded in 1986 and released on the Dutch Timeless label.

== Reception ==
Professional ratings
Review scores
Source	Rating
AllMusic	4/5 stars

AllMusic awarded the album 4 stars.

== Track listing ==
1. "Up Front" (David Williams)
2. "Django" (John Lewis)
3. "Let's Call This" (Thelonious Monk)
4. "Everything Must Change" (Benard Ighner)
5. "Good Bait" (Tadd Dameron, Count Basie)
6. "Mode for Joe" (Cedar Walton)

== Personnel ==
- Cedar Walton – piano
- David Williams – bass
- Billy Higgins – drums
