= Cedar's Blues =

Live album by Cedar Walton Quintet
- Released: 1985
- Recorded: March 1985; Osteria delle Dame, Bologna, Italy
- Genre: Jazz
- Length: 49:07
- Labels: Red; VPA 179
- Producer: Alberto Alberti

Cedar Walton chronology
The All American Trio (1983)	Cedar's Blues (1985)	The Trio 1 (1985)

Cedar's Blues is a live album by pianist Cedar Walton's Quintet recorded in 1985 and released on the Italian Red label.

== Reception ==
Professional ratings
Review scores
Source	Rating
AllMusic	4/5 stars
The Penguin Guide to Jazz Recordings	3.5/4 stars

Scott Yanow of AllMusic said, "The results may not be unique but the solos of Walton, Berg and Fuller are consistently satisfying, making this date easily recommended to hard bop collectors".

== Track listing ==
All compositions by Cedar Walton except as indicated

1. "Cedar's Blues" – 11:45
2. "Ugetsu" – 12:40
3. "Hindsight" – 6:50
4. "Over the Rainbow" (Harold Arlen, Yip Harburg) – 6:40
5. "Fiesta Español" – 10:35

== Personnel ==
- Cedar Walton – piano
- Curtis Fuller – trombone
- Bob Berg – tenor saxophone
- David Williams – bass
- Billy Higgins – drums
