= Mosaic (Eastern Rebellion album) =

Studio album by Eastern Rebellion
- Released: 1992
- Recorded: December 14 & 16, 1990
- Studio: BMG Studios, New York City, NY
- Genre: Jazz
- Length: 57:11
- Label: MusicMasters; 65073-2
- Producer: John Snyder

Eastern Rebellion chronology
Eastern Rebellion 4 (1983)	Mosaic (1992)	Simple Pleasure (1993)

Cedar Walton chronology
As Long as There's Music (1993)	Mosaic (1992)	Cedar Walton at Maybeck (1992)

Mosaic is an album by Eastern Rebellion, led by pianist Cedar Walton, recorded in 1990 and released by the MusicMasters label in 1992.

== Reception ==
Professional ratings
Review scores
Source	Rating
AllMusic	4/5 stars
All About Jazz	4/5 stars

AllMusic reviewer Stephen Cook stated "Driven by Walton's provocative and involved accompaniment, Moore ably displays his lithe and tart horn work ... A fine addition to any straight-ahead jazz collection". On All About Jazz Terrell Kent Holmes wrote "These stellar players combine to produce an album that is almost effortless in its excellence. The interplay throughout Mosaic is a pleasure to hear".

== Track listing ==
All compositions by Cedar Walton except where noted

1. "Sunflower" (Freddie Hubbard) – 9:25
2. "John's Blues" – 7:43
3. "I'll Let You Know" – 1:53
4. "Mosaic" – 6:28
5. "One for Kel" (David Williams) – 2:21
6. "My Old Flame" (Sam Coslow, Arthur Johnston) – 7:52
7. "I've Grown Accustomed to Her Face" (Frederick Loewe, Alan Jay Lerner) – 5:57
8. "Shoulders" – 2:54
9. "Josephine" (Ralph Moore) – 4:11
10. "My One and Only Love" (Guy Wood, Robert Mellin) – 2:52
11. "Bittersweet" (Sam Jones) – 5:34

== Personnel ==
- Cedar Walton – piano
- Ralph Moore – tenor saxophone
- David Williams – bass
- Billy Higgins – drums
