= Midnight Waltz =

Studio album by Cedar Walton
- Released: June 2005
- Recorded: March 18, 2005
- Studio: Avatar, New York City
- Genre: Jazz
- Length: 67:51
- Label: Venus; TKCV-35349
- Producer: Tetsuo Hara and Tood Barkin

Cedar Walton chronology
Underground Memoirs (2005)	Midnight Waltz (2005)	One Flight Down (2006)

Midnight Waltz is an album by pianist Cedar Walton which was recorded in 2005 and released on the Japanese Venus label.

== Reception ==
AllMusic reviewed the album stating "During his long career, Cedar Walton has been one of hard bop's most lyrical pianists, as demonstrated on this 2005 trio session for the Japanese label Venus. No matter the tempo or approach, it is very easy to find oneself singing along with Walton's infectious melodies".

Professional ratings
Review scores
Source	Rating
AllMusic	4/5 stars

== Track listing ==
All compositions by Cedar Walton

1. "Bremond's Blues" – 5:16
2. "Turquoise Twice" – 6:13
3. "Cedar's Blues" – 4:54
4. "Midnight Waltz" – 9:42
5. "Holy Land" – 6:53
6. "Theme for Jobim" – 4:35
7. "Dear Ruth" – 10:20
8. "The Vision" – 5:59
9. "Bolivia" – 7:55
10. "Ugetsu" – 6:04

== Personnel ==
- Cedar Walton – piano
- David Williams – bass
- Jimmy Cobb – drums
