= Roadgame =

Live album by Art Pepper
- Released: 1982
- Recorded: August 15, 1981
- Venue: Maiden Voyage, Los Angeles, CA
- Genre: Jazz
- Length: 42:51
- Label: Galaxy; GXY 5142
- Producer: Ed Michel

Art Pepper chronology
Art Pepper with Duke Jordan in Copenhagen 1981 (1981)	Roadgame (1982)	Art Lives (1981)

Roadgame (subtitled Recorded in Performance at Maiden Voyage, Los Angeles) is a live album by saxophonist Art Pepper, recorded in 1981 at the Maiden Voyage nightclub in Los Angeles, and released on the Galaxy label.

== Reception ==
Professional ratings
Review scores
Source	Rating
AllMusic	4.5/5 stars
The Rolling Stone Jazz Record Guide	4/5 stars

The AllMusic review by Scott Yanow noted, "Although only a year away from his death, the great Art Pepper was still very much in his prime for this memorable outing".

== Track listing ==
All compositions by Art Pepper except where noted.

1. "Roadgame" - 9:30
2. "Road Waltz" 10:55
3. "When You're Smiling" (Larry Shay, Mark Fisher, Joe Goodwin) - 8:46
4. "Everything Happens to Me" (Matt Dennis, Tom Adair) - 12:04
5. "Roadgame" [alternate take] - 11:02 Bonus track on CD reissue

== Personnel ==
- Art Pepper - alto saxophone (tracks 1, 2, 4 & 5), clarinet (track 3)
- George Cables - piano
- David Williams - bass
- Carl Burnett - drums
