= The Trio 1 =

Live album by Cedar Walton
- Released: 1986
- Recorded: March 28, 1985; Sala Europa, Bologna, Italy
- Genre: Jazz
- Length: 49:15
- Label: Red; VPA 192
- Producer: Alberto Alberti

Cedar Walton chronology
| Cedar's Blues (1985) | The Trio 1 (1986) | The Trio 2 (1985) |

The Trio 1 is a live album by pianist Cedar Walton, bassist David Williams and drummer Billy Higgins recorded in 1985 and first released on the Italian Red label.

== Reception ==
Professional ratings
Review scores
| Source | Rating |
|---|---|
| AllMusic | 4/5 stars |
| The Penguin Guide to Jazz | 3.5/4 stars |

AllMusic reviewer Scott Yanow awarded the album 4 stars stating, "There have been many Cedar Walton records put out through the years and the three that he and his trio made during a Bologna concert in 1985 rank with his best... easily recommended to straightahead jazz collectors."

== Track listing ==
All compositions by Cedar Walton except as indicated

1. "My Ship" (Ira Gershwin, Kurt Weill) – 9:50
2. "Ev'ry Time We Say Goodbye" (Cole Porter) – 8:15
3. "Satin Doll" (Duke Ellington, Johnny Mercer, Billy Strayhorn) – 6:20
4. "Lover Man" (Jimmy Davis, Roger "Ram" Ramirez, Jimmy Sherman) – 5:15
5. "Holy Land" – 8:55
6. "Voices Deep Within Me" – 10:40

== Personnel ==
- Cedar Walton – piano
- David Williams – bass
- Billy Higgins – drums
