= The All American Trio =

Studio album by Cedar Walton, Ron Carter and Jack DeJohnette
- Released: 1984
- Recorded: December 22–23, 1983
- Studio: Vanguard Studios, NYC
- Genre: Jazz
- Label: Baystate; RJL-8085
- Producer: Benny Golson, Fumimaru Kawashima and Makoto Kimata

Cedar Walton chronology
Eastern Rebellion 4 (1983)	The All American Trio (1984)	Cedar's Blues (1985)

The All American Trio (also released as Cedar Walton/Ron Carter/Jack DeJohnette) is an album by pianist Cedar Walton, bassist Ron Carter and drummer Jack DeJohnette recorded in 1983 and first released on the Japanese Baystate label.

== Reception ==
Professional ratings
Review scores
Source	Rating
AllMusic	3/5 stars
The Penguin Guide to Jazz	3.5/4 stars

Allmusic awarded the album 3 stars. The Penguin Guide to Jazz highlighted DeJohnette's musical progress since his 1968 recordings with Walton, and commented that "all three players are intuitively musical in approach".

== Track listing ==
All compositions by Cedar Walton except as indicated

1. "Iron Clad" – 5:52
2. "Alone Together" (Howard Dietz, Arthur Schwartz) – 6:37
3. "Blue Heart" (Benny Golson) – 5:05
4. "Ebony" (Jack DeJohnette) – 5:21
5. "All the Things You Are" (Jerome Kern, Oscar Hammerstein II) – 6:09
6. "A Slight Smile" (Ron Carter) – 5:07
7. "The Rubber Man" – 6:24
8. "B and A" (Carter) – 4:44

== Personnel ==
- Cedar Walton – piano
- Ron Carter – bass
- Jack DeJohnette – drums
