= Keith Smith (trumpeter) =

British jazz trumpeter (1940–2008)

- Born: Keith John Smith; 19 March 1940; Isleworth, Middlesex, England
- Died: 4 January 2008 (aged 67) London, England
- Genres: Jazz, Dixieland
- Occupation: Musician
- Instruments: Trumpet
- Years active: 1955–2008

Keith John Smith (19 March 1940 – 4 January 2008) was a British jazz trumpeter, principally active on the trad jazz and Dixieland revival scenes.

He was born in Isleworth, Middlesex, England. Smith originally intended to pursue studies in engineering, but began playing trumpet at the age of 15 and soon after began playing in local amateur ensembles, including Norrie Cox's band and the New Teao Brass Band (the latter including Chris Barber and Ken Colyer). His first professional gig came in 1960 as a member of Mickey Ashman's Ragtime Jazz Band. In 1962, he started the Climax Jazz Band and began recording.

In 1964, Smith visited New Orleans for the first time, where he played with George Lewis. Intending to move to the US permanently, he worked briefly in New Orleans before spending time in California and New York. In 1966, he organized an all-star band to tour Canada and Europe, which included Pops Foster, Jimmy Archey, and Alvin Alcorn. He moved to Denmark in 1972 and remained there until 1975, playing with Papa Bue in his Viking Jazz Band. After 1975 he returned to England, where he founded a new band, Hefty Jazz; this group was in existence for over a decade, touring internationally and featuring, at times, George Chisholm, Mick Pyne, Peanuts Hucko, Nat Pierce, Johnny Mince, and Barrett Deems. Concurrently, he was named leader of the Louis Armstrong All-Stars in 1981, and in 1984 served as producer for Stardust Road, a televised film made as a tribute to Hoagy Carmichael. Late in his life he lived in Germany, still active as a performer.

Keith Smith died in January 2008 in London, of a heart attack at the age of 67.
