= Arthur's Blues =

Live album by Art Pepper
- Released: 1991
- Recorded: August 13–15, 1981
- Venue: Maiden Voyage, Los Angeles, CA
- Genre: Jazz
- Length: 57:53
- Label: Galaxy; OJCCD-680-2
- Producer: Ed Michel and Laurie Pepper

Art Pepper chronology
APQ (1981)	Arthur's Blues (1991)	Art 'n' Zoot (1981)

Arthur's Blues is a live album by saxophonist Art Pepper recorded in 1981 at the Maiden Voyage nightclub in Los Angeles and released on the Galaxy label in 1991. The album features tracks that were first released on The Complete Galaxy Recordings box set in 1989.

== Reception ==
Professional ratings
Review scores
Source	Rating
AllMusic	4/5 stars
The Penguin Guide to Jazz Recordings	3/4 stars

The AllMusic review by Stewart Mason noted "the quartet burns through a set of standards and originals that covers Pepper's full range of playing styles ... However, the highlight is the title track, Pepper's last great recording. A 15-minute groove that swings from soulful and funky blues to an intense climax, "Arthur's Blues" puts to rest the rumors that Art Pepper's chops had deserted him in his final years".

== Track listing ==
All compositions by Art Pepper except where noted.

1. "Donna Lee" (Charlie Parker) - 9:36
2. "Road Waltz" - 14:03
3. "For Freddie" - 11:21
4. "But Beautiful" (Jimmy Van Heusen, Johnny Burke) - 8:10
5. "Arthur's Blues" - 14:43
- Recorded at the Maiden Voyage, in Los Angeles CA on August 13, 1981 (track 1), August 14, 1981 (tracks 2 & 4) and August 15, 1981 (tracks 3 & 5)

== Personnel ==
- Art Pepper - alto saxophone
- George Cables - piano
- David Williams - bass
- Carl Burnett - drums
