= London School of Dramatic Art =

Coordinates: 51.4934°N 0.1760°W

- South Kensington, London

Information
- School type: Drama School
- Established: 2005 (2nd iteration); 1931 (1st iteration)
- Founders: Jake Taylor and Urvashi Chand (2005); Mary Gertrude Pickersgill (1931)

The London School of Dramatic Art is a drama school based in South Kensington in London that offers training for those intending to pursue a professional career in acting.

== The School ==
Prior to the establishment of the 2005 school, there was another school situated on Baker Street of the same name that started in 1931 by Mary Gertrude Pickersgill. The 2005 school, which had no relation to the 1931 school, was initially set up by actor Jake Taylor and casting director Urvashi Chand. Jake, a graduate of Drama Centre, London, is currently the Principal. Urvashi is co-director, while continuing her work as a casting director. One of the main accents of the school's philosophy is that all the tutors are working professionals as opposed to permanent teaching staff. Previous and current staff include:

- Helen Dallimore
- Alicya Eyo
- David Carlyle
- Samantha Robinson

== Courses ==
LSDA runs intensive courses that cover the work of many key practitioners (Konstantin Stanislavski, Sanford Meisner, Uta Hagen) as well as industry skills to prepare for a working life as a professional actor.

Full Time:

- One Year Advanced Acting Diploma
- One Year Foundation Acting Diploma

Part Time:

- Two Year Diploma in Acting
- ACT101 – Sunday Classes

Summer Short Courses:

- Introduction to Drama School
- Screen Acting Techniques
- Audition Techniques

== Alumni ==
- Alice Pagani
- Éléonore Sarrazin
- Jake Graf
- Dávid Miller
- Waj Ali
- Carla Harrison-Hodge
- Melia Kreiling
- Damla Sönmez
- Susanna Cappellaro
- Federico Hu (PANDA BOI)
- Basdeo Panday (1st iteration of the school)

== David Game College Group ==
LSDA is part of the David Game College Group, which includes David Game College, London Film Academy, David Game School of Photography and Delamar Academy. David Game College has been going since the 1970s.

== Venues ==
LSDA's main location is 4 Bute Street, South Kensington, but it also holds classes and performances at The Bhavan and Drayton Arms Theatre.

== Sources ==
- https://lsda-acting.com/
