= As Long as There's Music (Cedar Walton album) =

Studio album by Cedar Walton
- Released: 1993
- Recorded: July 20, 1990
- Studio: Van Gelder Studio, Englewood Cliffs, New Jersey
- Genre: Jazz
- Length: 58:33
- Label: Muse; MCD 5405
- Producer: Cedar Walton

Cedar Walton chronology
Duo (1990)	As Long as There's Music (1993)	Mosaic (1992)

As Long as There's Music is an album by pianist Cedar Walton which was recorded in 1990 and first released on the Muse label in 1993.

== Reception ==
Professional ratings
Review scores
Source	Rating
Allmusic	2.5/5 stars

In his review on Allmusic, David R. Adler states "While the playing on the album is excellent, the production lacks the warmth of some of Walton's earlier sessions".

== Track listing ==
All compositions by Cedar Walton except where noted.

1. "Young and Foolish" (Albert Hague, Arnold B. Horwitt) – 6:01
2. "Meaning of the Blues" (Bobby Troup, Leah Worth) – 9:24
3. "I'm Not So Sure" – 6:01
4. "Ground Work" – 6:25
5. "Newest Blues" – 5:39
6. "Pannonica" (Thelonious Monk) – 8:57
7. "As Long as There's Music" (Jule Styne, Sammy Cahn) – 6:27
8. "Voices Deep Within" – 9:37

== Personnel ==
- Cedar Walton – piano
- Terence Blanchard – trumpet
- Jesse Davis – alto saxophone
- David Williams – bass
- Billy Higgins – drums
