= Art Lives =

Live album by Art Pepper
- Released: 1983
- Recorded: August 13 & 15, 1981
- Venue: Maiden Voyage, Los Angeles, CA
- Genre: Jazz
- Label: Galaxy; GXY 5145
- Producer: Ed Michel

Art Pepper chronology
Roadgame (1981)	Art Lives (1983)	APQ (1981)

Art Lives (subtitled Recorded in Performance at the Maiden Voyage, Los Angeles) is a live album by saxophonist Art Pepper, recorded in 1981 at the Maiden Voyage nightclub in Los Angeles and released on the Galaxy label.

== Reception ==
Professional ratings
Review scores
Source	Rating
AllMusic	4/5 stars
The Rolling Stone Jazz Record Guide	4/5 stars

The AllMusic review by Scott Yanow noted, "Pepper, pianist George Cables, bassist David Williams, and drummer Carl Burnett are heard at their best on 'Allen's Alley' and 'Samba Mom Mom'. A special highlight is a passionate duet by Pepper and Cables on 'But Beautiful'."

== Track listing ==
All compositions by Art Pepper except where noted.

1. "Allen's Alley" (Denzil Best) - 10:36
2. "Samba Mom Mom" - 10:39
3. "But Beautiful" (Jimmy Van Heusen, the lyrics by Johnny Burke) - 8:43
4. "Thank You Blues" - 13:34
- Recorded at the Maiden Voyage, in Los Angeles, CA, on August 13, 1981 (track 4) and August 15, 1981 (tracks 1–3)

== Personnel ==
- Art Pepper - alto saxophone
- George Cables - piano
- David Williams - bass (tracks 1, 2 & 4)
- Carl Burnett - drums (tracks 1, 2 & 4)
