= Panda Boi =

Italian content creator (born 2002)

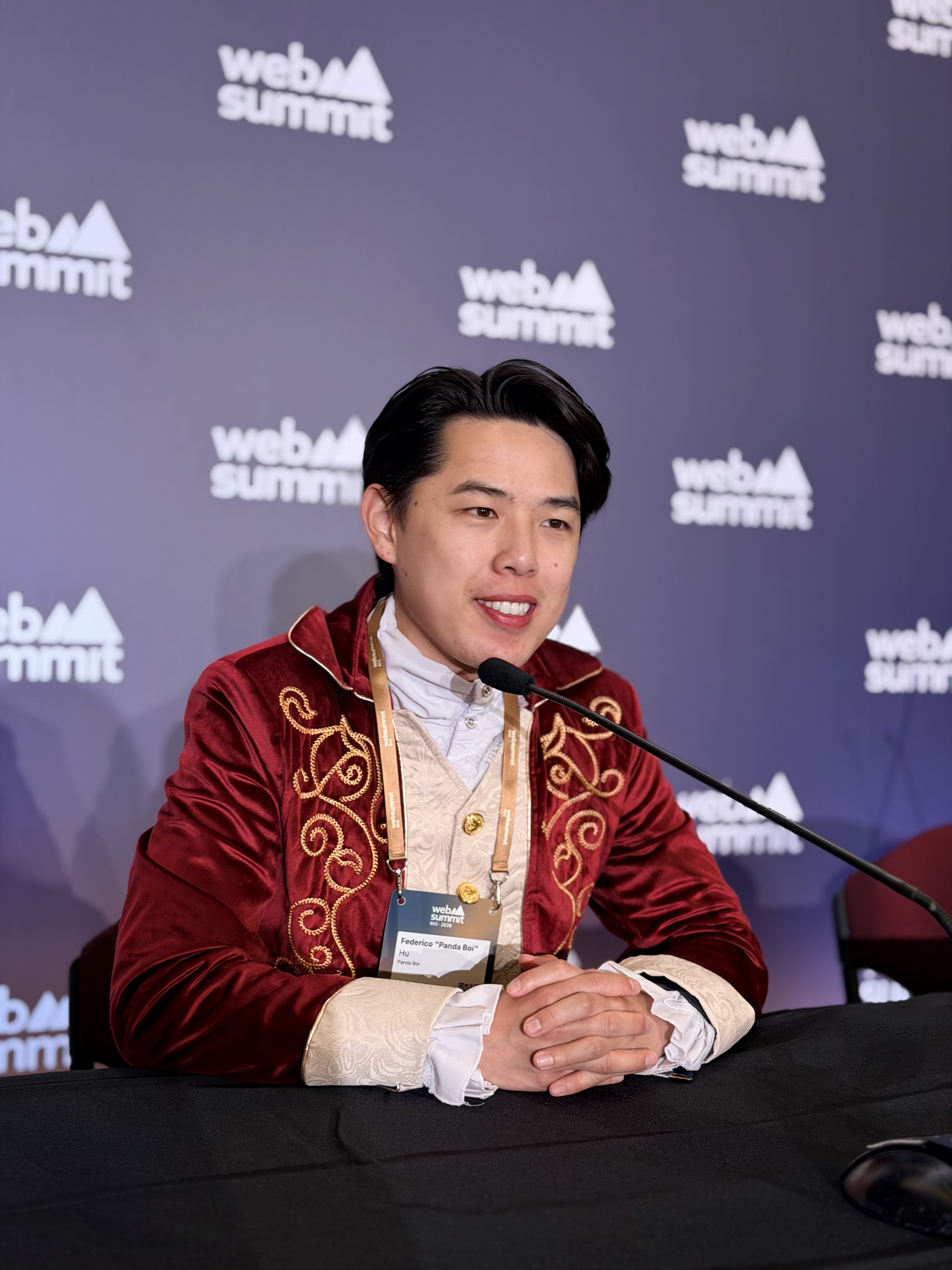
- Panda Boi in 2026
- Born: Federico Hu; 20 December 2002 (age 23); Milan Province, Italy
- Education: London School of Dramatic Art
- Occupations: Influencer, social media personality

TikTok information
- Page: pandaboi.com
- Years active: 2020-present
- Genres: Comedy, Emotional
- Followers: 12.3 million

YouTube information
- Channel: PANDABOI
- Years active: 2020–present
- Genres: Comedy; drama; entertainment
- Subscribers: 62.3 million
- Views: 27.5 billion
- Last updated: 28 October 2026
- Website: pandaboi.com

Federico Hu (born December 20, 2002), known online as Panda Boi, is an Italian-Chinese actor, YouTuber and social media personality. He is known for his popular YouTube channel in Italy.

Hu created his YouTube channel in 2020 and began his career by posting street interview content. He has created some of the most widely circulated internet trends that has inspired domestic and international creators.

In 2024, Hu was listed in Fortune Italy's Top 25 Content Creators list.

In May 2025, Hu was awarded the Grand Prix title at WIBA Awards during the Cannes Festival.

== Early life and education ==
Hu was born in the province of Milan, Italy, to working-class Chinese immigrant parents. He grew up in the Cinisello Balsamo, a neighborhood in Italy.

His family was one of the first generation of Chinese immigrants to settle in Italy. In an interview, Hu stated that he had experienced discrimination and racism because of his parent's origins.

As a child, Hu dreamed of becoming an actor and he pursued acting as he grew older. However, he struggled to find work in the Italian entertainment industry, due to the lack of Asian representation.

Hu applied to the Centro sperimentale di roma, but was rejected. He connected the rejection to his ethnically diverse appearance.

Hu later moved to Los Angeles, where he used all of his savings to pay for one semester of tuition at Santa Monica College. He returned to Italy after he no longer had the financial means to keep going.

He moved to London to pursue acting and graduated at the London School of Dramatic Art.

== Career ==
In 2011 Hu appeared ,as a child actor, in the movie Shun li and the poet. He played the role of the protagonist's son. The film was presented at the 68th Venice international film festival.

Over the next few years, Hu auditioned for more than 1,000 film but was never selected. After realising there were no opportunities for him in the film industry, he began posting on TikTok in 2020, during the COVID-19 pandemic.

After gaining nearly 12 million followers on TikTok, he shifted his focus to YouTube.

In August 2021, Hu released his book, Panda Boi Hello English, published by Italian publishing company Mondadori Electa.

In 2023, Hu released a mobile game entitled Panda Boi Runner.

In 2025, Hu expressed his interest to make another attempt in the Film industry.

In 2026, he participated in the Italian Adaptation of Reality Show Los 50, which features 50 of the Most influential personalities in Italian Media.

== Recognition ==
At the beginning of 2022, Hu was among the top 50 most viewed YouTube channels worldwide for the week of January 23, placing at 27th.

In 2023, Hu was featured in the Italian magazine Millionaire as the most subscribed YouTube channel in Italy.

In May 2023, Hu's YouTube channel was the fifth most watched YouTube channel worldwide.

In 2024, he was listed in Fortune's Italy Top 25 Content Creator. That same year, he entered the top 100 most subscribed YouTube channels worldwide; he also entered the top 50 most subscribed YouTube channels worldwide, placing at 44th place.

As of September 2025, Hu's channel is the most-subscribed YouTube channel in Italy with over 60 million subscribers.

Hu holds the Italian record for the fastest YouTube channel in Italy to reach one million subscribers.

On 23 May 2025, Hu won the Grand Prix Title at Wiba Awards during the Cannes Film Festival.

== Awards ==
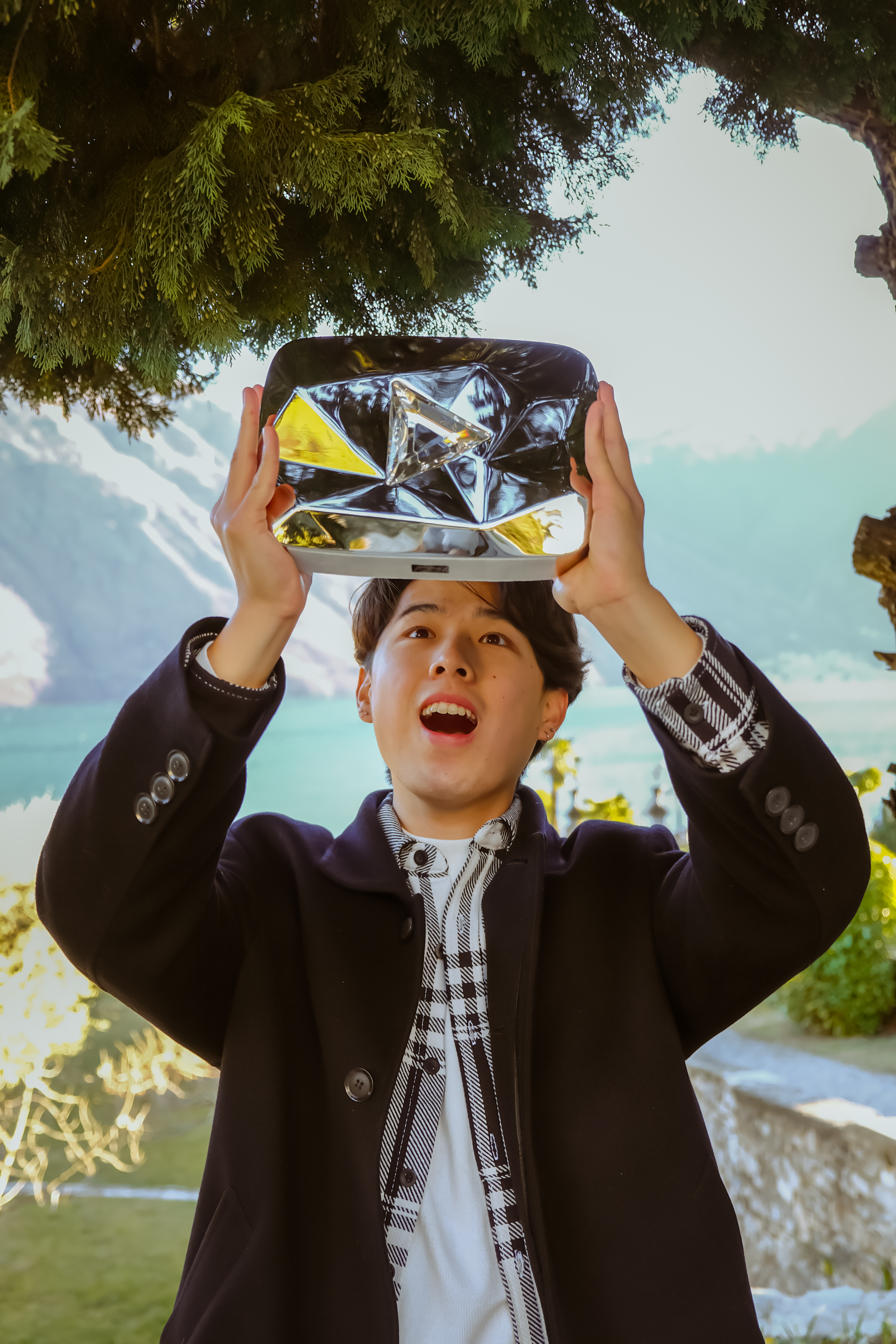
Panda Boi holding his diamond play button in Italy

Year	Award	Category	Result	Refs.
2024	Fortune Magazine Italy Top Creators	Entertainment	Won	
2025	2025 Wiba Awards	Grand Prix	Won	

== Personal life ==
Hu was born in Italy and speaks fluent Italian. He also speaks English, Chinese, and Spanish. He moved temporarily to Ukraine in 2021 and moved back to Italy in January 2022, one month before the start of the Russo-Ukraine War.

While in Ukraine, Hu met his girlfriend, Liudmyla. She remained in Ukraine after Hu returned to Italy. Once the war started, Hu drove 2000 km to bring her to Italy. His actions have been covered internationally by media from UK, Italy, and Germany.
