= Bute Street, London =

Street in London

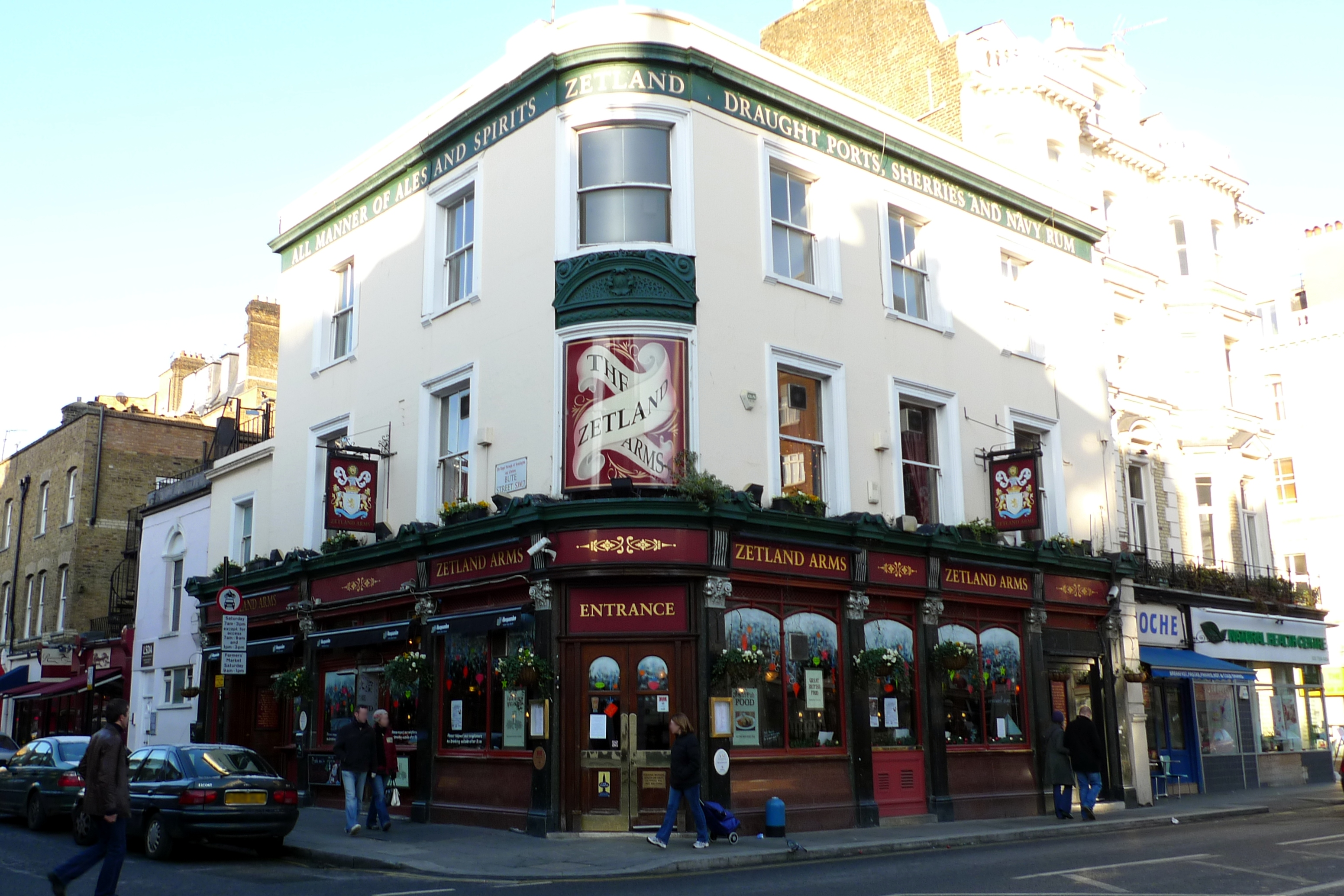
The Zetland Arms, on the corner of Bute Street and Old Brompton Road

Bute Street is a street in South Kensington, London SW7. It has been pedestrianised since 2020. The street has a weekly farmers' market on Saturdays and is also known for its French-influenced cafes and shops.

The Zetland Arms, a pub dating from the mid-1840s, is at No. 2 Bute Street, on the corner of the street and Old Brompton Road. The London School of Dramatic Art is at No. 4.
