= Drayton Arms, Earls Court =

Pub in Earl's Court, London

Drayton Arms
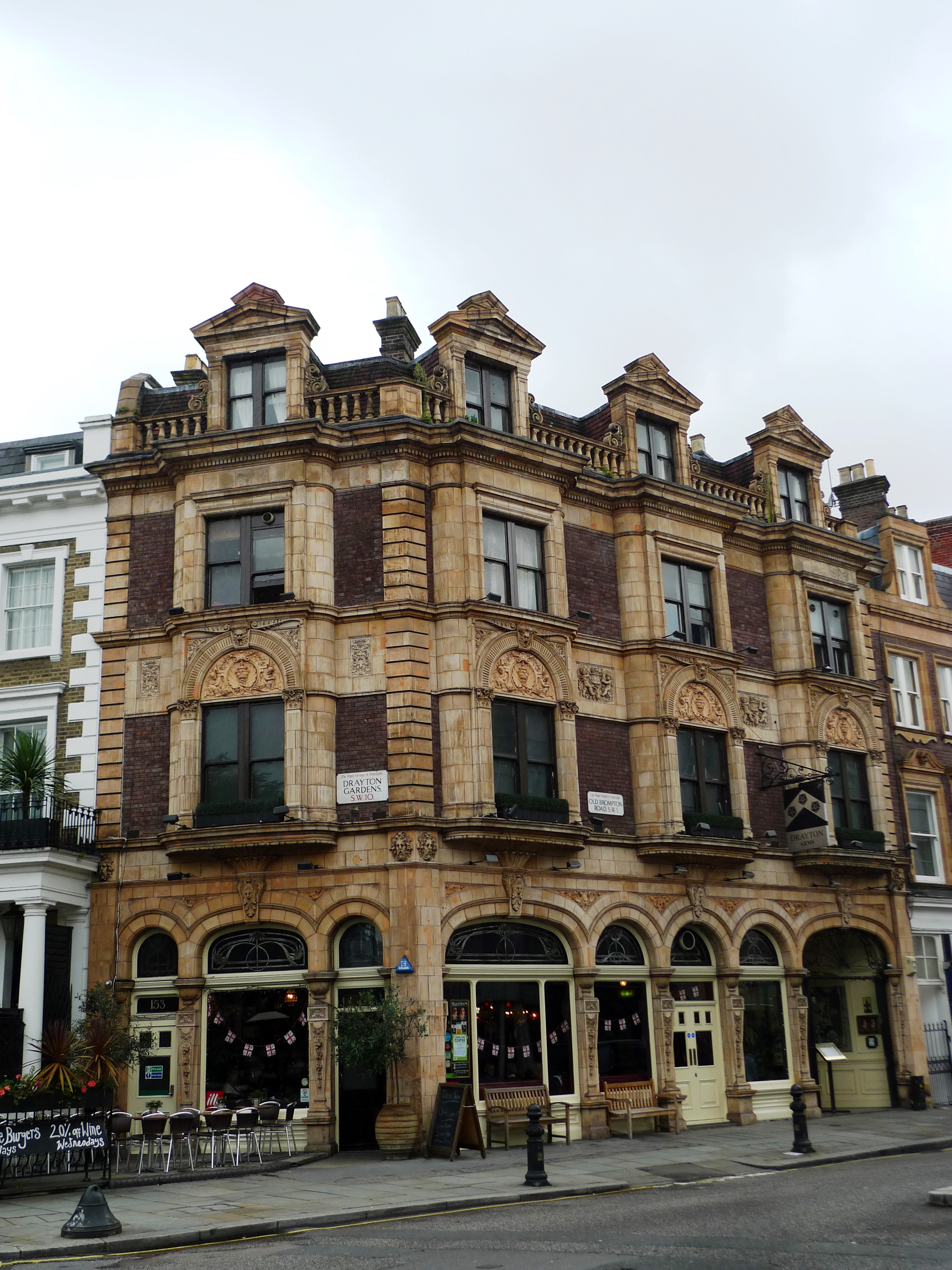
- The Drayton Arms in 2013
- Interactive map of the Drayton Arms area

General information
- Location: London, England
- Coordinates: 51°29′26.1″N 0°10′59.9″W

Design and construction
- Designations

Listed Building – Grade II
- Official name: Drayton Arms Public House
- Designated: 7 November 1984
- Reference no.: 1225769

The Drayton Arms is a Grade II listed public house at 153 Old Brompton Road, Earls Court, London.

It was built in the late 19th century, and the architect is not known. It is operated by Castle Pubs, a division of Mitchells & Butlers. The Drayton Arms Theatre operates in the building.
