= APQ (album) =

Live album by Art Pepper Quartet
- Released: 1984
- Recorded: August 13 & 15, 1981
- Venue: Maiden Voyage, Los Angeles, CA
- Genre: Jazz
- Length: 41:59
- Label: Galaxy; GXY 5151
- Producer: Ed Michel and Laurie Pepper

Art Pepper chronology
Art Lives (1981)	APQ (1984)	Arthur's Blues (1981)

APQ (subtitled The Maiden Voyage Sessions, Vol. 3) is a live album by saxophonist Art Pepper's Quartet recorded in 1981 at the Maiden Voyage nightclub in Los Angeles and released on the Galaxy label.

== Reception ==
Professional ratings
Review scores
Source	Rating
AllMusic	3/5 stars
The Rolling Stone Jazz Record Guide	3/5 stars

The AllMusic review by Ron Wynn stated "Hardly vital, but contains some solid solos".

== Track listing ==
All compositions by Art Pepper except where noted.

1. "Mambo Koyama" - 11:36
2. "Valse Triste" - 9:21
3. "What's New?" (Bob Haggart, Johnny Burke) - 9:58
4. "Landscape" - 11:04
- Recorded at the Maiden Voyage, in Los Angeles CA on August 13, 1981 (tracks 2–4) and August 15, 1981 (track 1)

== Personnel ==
- Art Pepper - alto saxophone
- George Cables - piano
- David Williams - bass
- Carl Burnett - drums
