= Opucikwar =

Extinct language of the Andaman Islands, India

Pucikwar
- O-Puchikwar
- Native to: India
- Region: Andaman Islands; Straight Island.
- Ethnicity: Pucikwar people
- Extinct: between 1931 and 1951
- Language family: Great Andamanese: Central Andamanese; Opucikwar–Okol; Pucikwar

Language codes
- ISO 639-3: apq
- Glottolog: apuc1241
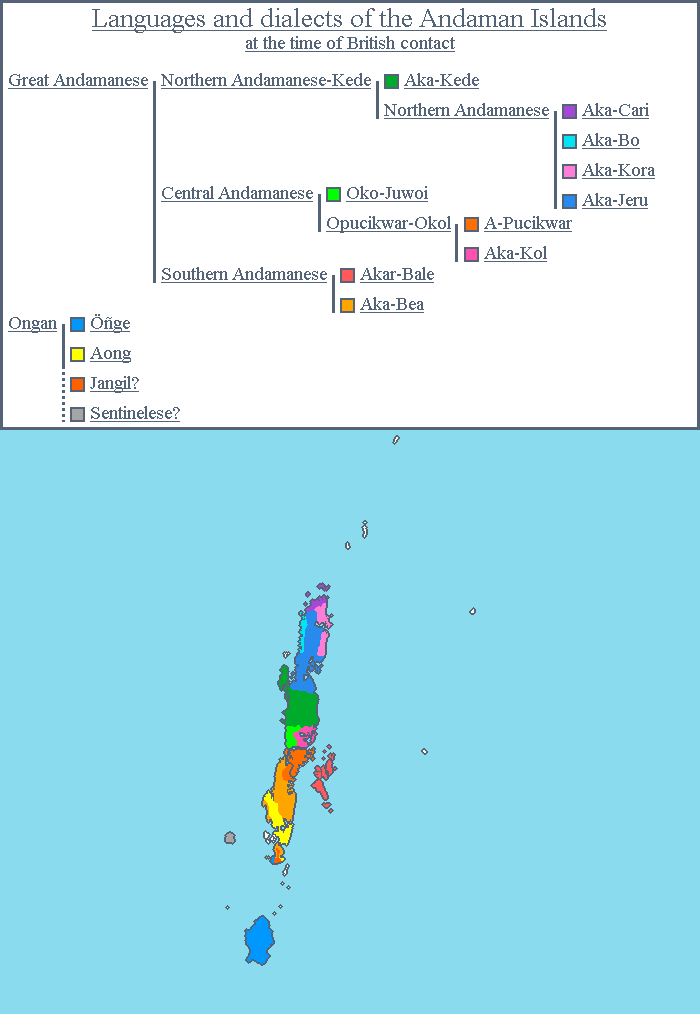
- A-Pucikwar

The Pucikwar language, O-Puchikwar, is an extinct language of the Andaman Islands, India, formerly spoken by the Pucikwar people on the south coast of Middle Andaman, the northeast coast of South Andaman, and on Baratang Island. It belonged to the Great Andamanese family.

== History ==
As the colonization and settlement process of the Andaman Islands intensified from the late 19th century and into the 20th century, the indigenous Great Andamanese groups were greatly reduced in number and became alienated from their traditional territories. The few surviving Great Andamanese soon lost the cultural and linguistic distinctions among them that were present at the onset of the 19th century, when at least ten distinct tribal and linguistic groups were recorded. By the 1901 census, the Pucikwar were reduced to 50, but distinctions between tribal groups and subgroups had become considerably blurred (and some intermarriage had also occurred with Indian and Karen (Burmese) settlers). The Pucikwar tribe disappeared as a distinct group sometime after 1931.

== Grammar ==
The Great Andamanese languages are agglutinative languages, with an extensive prefix and suffix system. They have a distinctive noun class system based largely on body parts, in which every noun and adjective may take a prefix according to which body part it is associated with (on the basis of shape, or functional association). Thus, for instance, the *aka- at the beginning of the language names is a prefix for objects related to the tongue.

Body parts are inalienably possessed, requiring a possessive adjective prefix to complete them, so one cannot say "head" alone, but only "my, or his, or your, etc. head".

The basic pronouns are almost identical throughout the Great Andamanese languages.

Judging from the available sources, the Andamanese languages have only two cardinal numbers — one and two — and their entire numerical lexicon is one, two, one more, some more, and all.

== See also ==
- Andamanese languages
