= Mick Pyne =

English jazz pianist (1940–1995)

Michael John "Mick" Pyne (2 September 1940 in Thornton-le-Dale – 23 May 1995 in London) was an English jazz pianist. His brother was jazz musician Chris Pyne.

== Biography ==
Pyne learned piano from the age of three; he later learned violin, and began playing cornet when he was 13. Around 1957 he and his brother Chris formed their own band before Mick moved to London in 1959. He played briefly with Tony Kinsey in 1962, then played U.S. Army bases in France, in addition to working with Alexis Korner, from 1962 to 1963.

Returning to London at the end of 1963, Pyne worked in the 1960s with John Stevens, Phil Seamen, and extensively with Tubby Hayes, in addition to doing European tours with Stan Getz, Roland Kirk, Lee Konitz, Hank Mobley, and Joe Williams. In the 1970s he worked with Hayes as well as with Ronnie Scott, Humphrey Lyttelton, Jon Eardley and Cecil Payne. In the 1980s Pyne's associations included Georgie Fame, Adelaide Hall, Keith Smith and Charlie Watts.

== Discography ==
=== As leader/co-leader ===
- Alone Together (Spotlite, 1977)
- Two of a Kind (Spotlite, 1977) – with Jon Eardley
- Once in a While (Black Lion, 1978) – with Humphrey Lyttelton
- A Little Blue (Miles Music, 1987 [1988])
- The Artistry of Mick Pyne (Soliloquy, 1988)

=== As sideman ===
With Michael Gibbs

- Michael Gibbs (Deram, 1970)
- Tanglewood 63 (Deram, 1970 [1971])

With Tubby Hayes

- Mexican Green (Fontana, 1967 [1968])
- Live 1969 (Harlequin, 1969 [1986])
- England's Great Late Jazz (IAJRC, 1957–1972 [1987])
- For Members Only - '67 Live (Miles Music, 1967 [1990])
- 200 % Proof (Master Mix, 1969 [1992])

With Humphrey Lyttelton

- In Swinger (Happy Bird, 1974)
- South Bank Swing Session (Black Lion, 1973 [1974])
- Take It from the Top: A Dedication to Duke Ellington (Black Lion, 1975)
- Kansas City Woman (Black Lion, 1975) – with Buddy Tate
- Hazy Crazy and Blue (Black Lion, 1976 [1977])
- Sir Humph's Delight! (Black Lion, 1979)
- One Day I Met an African (Black Lion, 1980)
- Echoes of Harlem (Black Lion, 1981 [1982])
- It Seems Like Yesterday (Calligraph, 1983) – with Wally Fawkes
- Echoes of the Duke (Calligraph, 1985) – with Helen Shapiro
- Movin' and Groovin' (Black Lion, 1983 [1990])

With Bob Wilber

- Bean: Bob Wilber's Tribute to Coleman Hawkins (Arbors, 1994 [1995])
- A Man and His Music (J&M, 1993 [1996])

With others

- Philly Joe Jones, Trailways Express (Black Lion, 1968 [1971])
- Cecil Payne, Bright Moments (Spotlite, 1980)
- Rollercoaster, Wonderin' (Pye, 1980)
- Spontaneous Music Ensemble, The Source - From and Towards (Tangent, 1970 [1971])
- John Stevens, Blue (Culture Press, 1993 [1997])
- Kathy Stobart, Joe Temperley, Saxploitation (Spotlite, 1976)
