= Old Brompton Road =

Street in South Kensington, London

Coordinates: 51°29′18″N 0°11′37″W

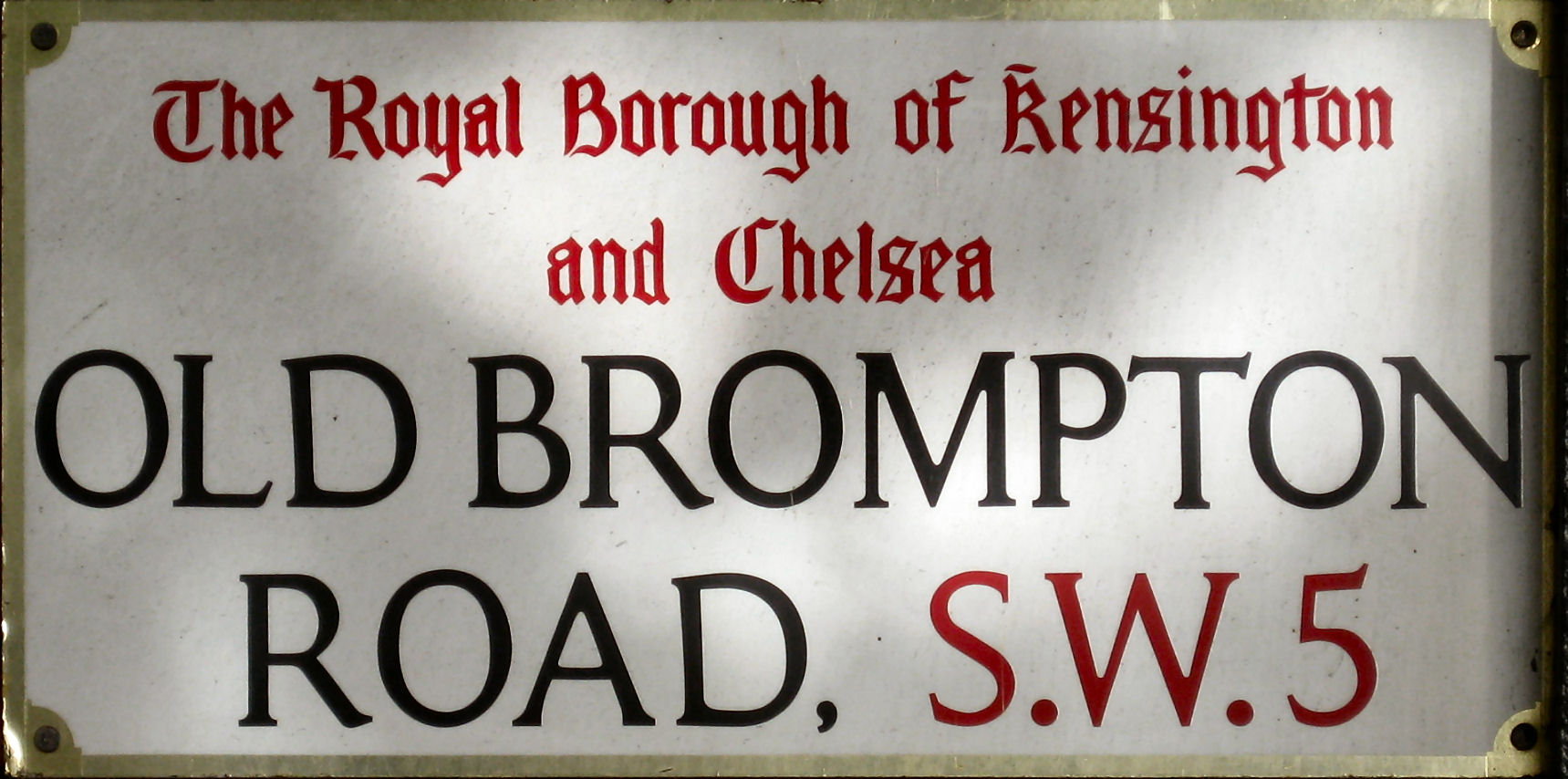

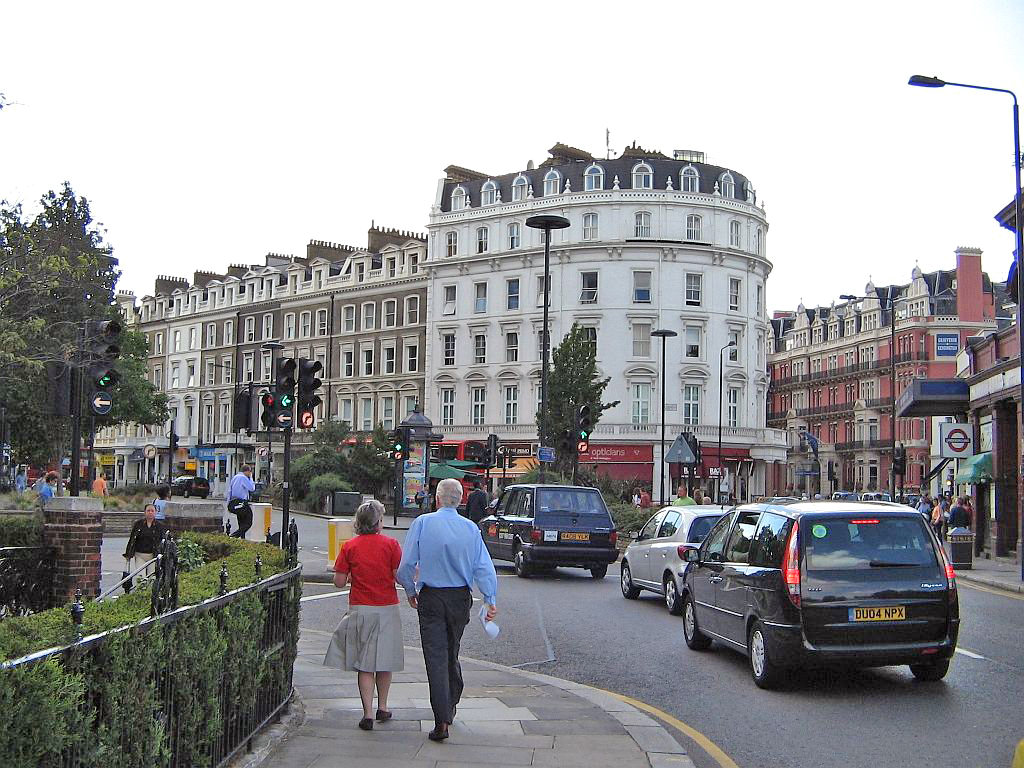
The junction connecting Old Brompton Road and Pelham Street, outside South Kensington Underground station.

Old Brompton Road is a major street in the South Kensington district of The Royal Borough of Kensington and Chelsea, London.

It starts from South Kensington Underground station and runs south-west, through a mainly residential area, until it reaches West Brompton and the area around Earl's Court tube station. It runs through the SW5 and SW7 postcodes.

There are several five-star hotels and upmarket shops along the road. One of the most famous auction houses in the world, Christie's, was previously located near the eastern end of the road at No. 85.

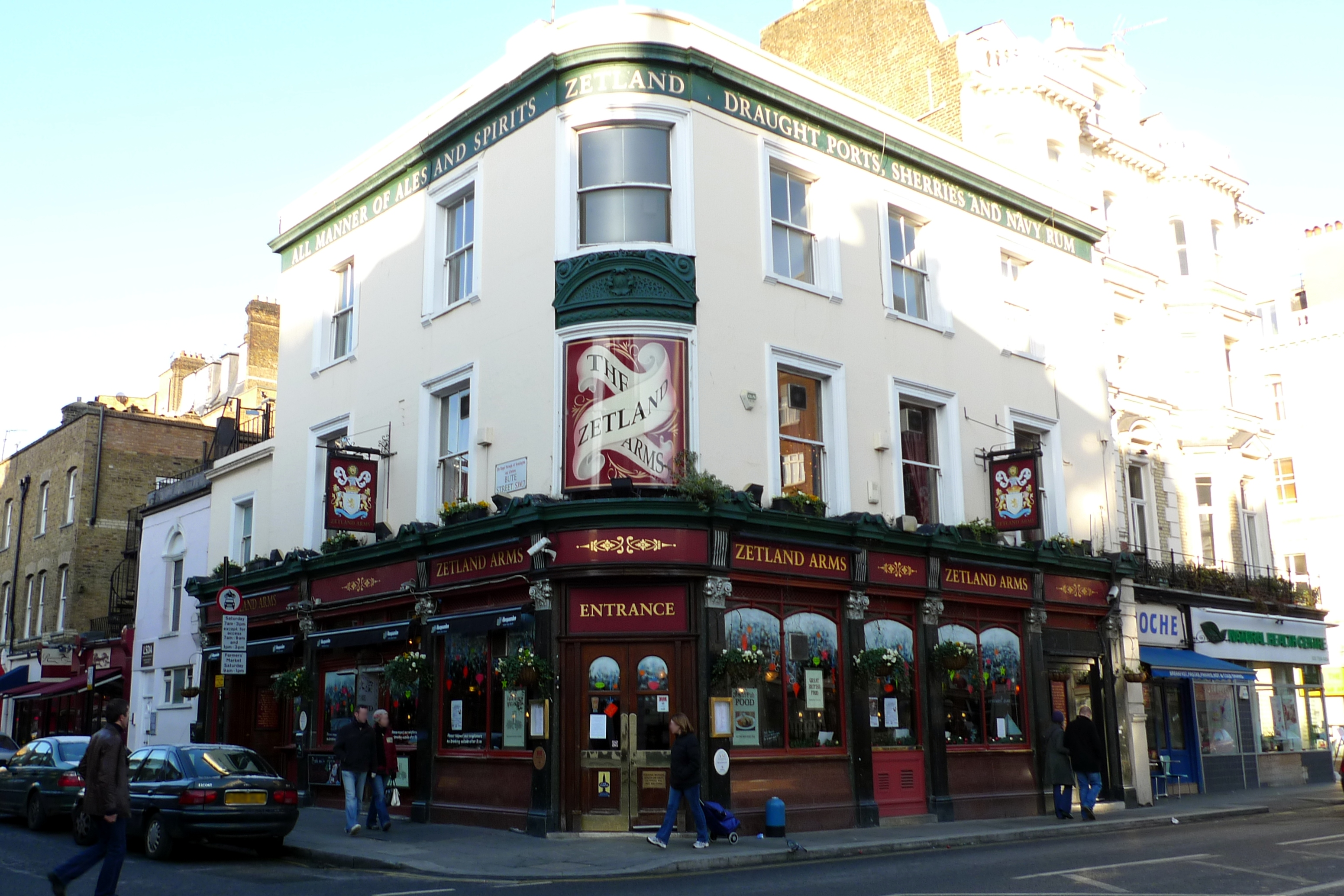
The Zetland Arms, on the corner of Bute Street and Old Brompton Road

The Drayton Arms is a Grade II listed pub and theatre at No. 153. The Zetland Arms, a pub dating from the mid-1840s, is on the corner of Old Brompton Road and Bute Street. The pub at No. 261, The Pembroke, was formerly a gay bar known as the Coleherne. It had become notorious for being the stalking ground for three serial killers, Dennis Nilsen, Michael Lupo and Colin Ireland. It is also mentioned in the song 'Hanging Around' by The Stranglers, as well as in Armistead Maupin's Tales of the City book Babycakes.

Another landmark of the road is the Troubadour which has been a cultural hub for over fifty years. The coffee-house above, now a restaurant, has hosted the founding of Private Eye and the writing of many books, while the club below has been a venue for Bob Dylan and Adele.

The most famous resident was Diana, Princess of Wales before her 1981 engagement and subsequent marriage to Charles, Prince of Wales. She shared a flat which she owned in Coleherne Court with three others before subsequently moving on to Clarence House.

The road is sometimes confused with Brompton Road which lies further to the east, in the Brompton area of London, in the part better known as "Knightsbridge".

== See also ==
- Brompton, London
