= Barry Galbraith =

American jazz guitarist (1919–1983)

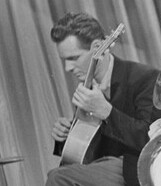
- Barry Galbraith (left) in the Columbia Picture studios, September 1947. Photograph by William P. Gottlieb.

Background information
- Born: December 18, 1919; Pittsburgh, Pennsylvania, United States
- Died: January 13, 1983 (aged 63) Bennington, Vermont
- Genres: Jazz
- Occupation: Musician
- Instrument: Guitar
- Years active: 1940s–1970s

Joseph Barry Galbraith (December 18, 1919 – January 13, 1983) was an American jazz guitarist.

Galbraith moved to New York City from McDonald, Pennsylvania, in the early 1940s and found work playing with Babe Russin, Art Tatum, Red Norvo, Hal McIntyre, and Teddy Powell. He played with Claude Thornhill in 1941–1942 and again in 1946–1949 after serving in the Army. He did a tour with Stan Kenton in 1953.

Galbraith did extensive work as a studio musician for NBC and CBS in the 1950s and 1960s; among those he played with were Miles Davis, Michel Legrand, Tal Farlow, Coleman Hawkins, George Barnes, John Lewis, Hal McKusick, Oscar Peterson, Max Roach, George Russell, John Carisi, Urbie Green, and Tony Scott. He also accompanied the singers Anita O'Day, Chris Connor, Billie Holiday, Helen Merrill, Sarah Vaughan and Dinah Washington on record. He was a mentor to Ralph Patt.

In 1961, he appeared in the film After Hours. In 1963-1964 he played on Gil Evans's album The Individualism of Gil Evans, and in 1965 he appeared on Stan Getz and Eddie Sauter's soundtrack to the 1965 film Mickey One. From 1970 to 1975 he taught at CUNY and published a guitar method book in 1982. From 1976–77 Galbraith taught guitar at New England Conservatory in Boston.

He died from cancer in Bennington at the age of 63.

== Discography ==
=== As leader ===
- The Rhythm Section (Epic, 1956)
- Rhythm + 1 (Epic, 1956)
- Guitar and the Wind (Decca, 1958)

=== As sideman ===
With Chris Connor

- Chris Connor (Atlantic, 1956)
- Chris Connor Sings the George Gershwin Almanac of Song (Atlantic, 1957)
- Sings Ballads of the Sad Cafe (Atlantic, 1959)
- A Portrait of Chris (Atlantic, 1960)

With Bobby Darin

- That's All (Atco, 1959)

With Don Elliott

- Don Elliot Sings (Bethlehem, 1955)
- Mellophone (Bethlehem, 1955)
- The Voices of Don Elliott (ABC-Paramount, 1957)
- The Mello Sound (Decca, 1958)
- Love Is a Necessary Evil (Columbia, 1962)

With Urbie Green

- The Persuasive Trombone of Urbie Green (Command, 1960)
- The Persuasive Trombone of Urbie Green Vol. 2 (Command, 1962)
- Urbie Green and His 6-Tet (Command, 1963)
- Twenty-One Trombones (Project 3 Total Sound, 1967)

With Coleman Hawkins

- The Hawk in Paris (Vik, 1956)
- The Hawk in Hi Fi (RCA Victor, 1956)
- The Hawk Flies High (Riverside, 1957)
- Desafinado (Impulse!, 1963)

With Milt Jackson

- Ballads & Blues (Atlantic, 1956)
- The Ballad Artistry of Milt Jackson (Atlantic, 1959)
- Jazz 'n' Samba (Impulse!, 1964)

With Johnny Mathis

- Johnny Mathis (Columbia, 1956)

With Hal McKusick

- East Coast Jazz Series No. 8 (Bethlehem, 1955)
- In a Twentieth-Century Drawing Room (RCA Victor, 1956)
- Jazz at the Academy (Coral, 1957)
- The Jazz Workshop (RCA Victor, 1957)
- Cross Section-Saxes (Decca, 1958)
- Hal Mckusick Plays/Betty St. Claire Sings (Fresh Sound, 1989)

With Carmen McRae

- Birds of a Feather (Decca, 1958)
- Mad About the Man, Carmen McRae Sings Noel Coward (Decca, 1958)
- Second to None (Mainstream, 1964)

With Helen Merrill

- Helen Merrill (EmArcy, 1954)
- Helen Merrill with Strings (EmArcy, 1955)
- Dream of You (EmArcy, 1956)
- You've Got a Date with the Blues (MetroJazz, 1958)
- The Nearness of You (EmArcy, 1958)

With George Russell

- The Jazz Workshop (RCA Victor, 1957)
- New York, N.Y. (Decca, 1959)
- Jazz in the Space Age (Decca, 1960)

With Creed Taylor

- Shock Music in Hi-Fi (ABC-Paramount, 1958)
- Lonelyville: The Nervous Beat (ABC-Paramount, 1959)
- The Best of the Barrack Ballads (ABC-Paramount, 1960)

With others

- Manny Albam, Sophisticated Lady (Coral, 1958)
- Manny Albam, Brass on Fire (Solid State, 1966)
- Cannonball Adderley, Jump for Joy (Mercury, 1958)
- Steve Allen, Steve Allen Plays Neal Hefti (Coral, 1958)
- Steve Allen, ...and All That Jazz (Dot, 1959)
- Ernestine Anderson, The Fascinating Ernestine (Mercury, 1960)
- Mildred Bailey, Me and the Blues (Atlantic, 2000)
- George Barnes, Guitar Galaxies (1962)
- Charlie Barnet, More Charlie Barnet (Everest, 1959)
- Vinnie Bell, Big Sixteen Guitar Favorites (Musicor, 1965)
- Louie Bellson, Breakthrough! (Project 3 Total Sound, 1968)
- Tony Bennett, Hometown, My Town (Columbia, 1959)
- Tony Bennett, My Heart Sings (Columbia, 1961)
- Tony Bennett, Snowfall: The Tony Bennett Christmas Album (Columbia, 1968)
- Tony Bennett, I've Gotta Be Me (Columbia, 1969)
- Eddie Bert, Modern Moods (Fresh Sound, 1955)
- Andy and the Bey Sisters, Andy Bey and the Bey Sisters (Prestige, 2000)
- Will Bradley, Hi-Fi Dixie (Jazztone, 1957)
- John Benson Brooks, Alabama Concerto (Riverside, 1959)
- Clifford Brown, Clifford Brown with Strings (EmArcy, 1955)
- Ruth Brown, Ruth Brown '65 (Mainstream, 1965)
- Ruth Brown, Softly (Mainstream, 1972)
- Ralph Burns, Very Warm for Jazz (MCA, 1975)
- Kenny Burrell, Lotsa Bossa Nova! (Kapp, 1963)
- Billy Butterfield, Thank You for a Lovely Evening (RCA Victor, 1958)
- Billy Byers, Joe Newman, Eddie Bert, East Coast Sounds (Jazztone, 1957)
- Jimmy Cleveland, Introducing Jimmy Cleveland and His All Stars (EmArcy, 1956)
- Al Cohn, Bill Perkins and Richie Kamuca, The Brothers! (RCA Victor, 1956)
- Freddy Cole, Waiter, Ask the Man to Play the Blues (Dot, 1964)
- Al Jazzbo Collins, Presents Swinging at the Opera (Everest, 1960)
- Miles Davis, Facets (CBS, 1967)
- Wild Bill Davison, With Strings Attached (Columbia, 1957)
- Eric Dolphy, Vintage Dolphy (GM, 1986)
- Bill Evans, Piano Player (Columbia, 1998)
- Gil Evans, Into the Hot (Impulse!, 1962)
- Gil Evans, The Individualism of Gil Evans (Verve, 1964)
- Tal Farlow, The Tal Farlow Album (Norgran, 1954)
- Art Farmer, Last Night When We Were Young (ABC-Paramount, 1957)
- Art Farmer, Listen to Art Farmer and the Orchestra (Mercury, 1962)
- Morey Feld, Jazz Goes to B'Way (Kapp, 1955)
- Maynard Ferguson, The Blues Roar (Mainstream, 1964)
- Ella Fitzgerald, The First Lady of Song (Decca, 1958)
- Curtis Fuller, Cabin in the Sky (Impulse!, 1962)
- Stan Getz, Stan Getz Plays Music from the Soundtrack of Mickey One (MGM, 1965)
- Betty Glamann, Swinging On a Harp (Mercury, 1957)
- Don Goldie, Trumpet Caliente (Argo, 1963)
- Benny Goodman, Fletcher Henderson Arrangements (Columbia, 1953)
- Buddy Greco, I Like It Swinging (Columbia, 1961)
- Johnny Griffin, White Gardenia (Riverside, 1961)
- Johnny Griffin, Big Soul (Milestone, 1973)
- Johnny Guarnieri, The Songs of Will Hudson & Eddie De Lange (Coral, 1993)
- Lenny Hambro, The Nature of Things (Epic, 1958)
- Johnny Hartman, The Voice That Is! (Impulse!, 1964)
- Dolores Hawkins, Dolores (LPTime, 2010)
- Woody Herman, The Fourth Herd (Jazz Legacy, 1960)
- Milt Hinton & Wendell Marshall & Bull Ruther, Basses Loaded! (RCA Victor, 1955)
- Billie Holiday, Lady in Satin (Columbia, 1958)
- Billie Holiday, Billie Holiday (MGM, 1959)
- John Lee Hooker, It Serve You Right to Suffer (Impulse!, 1966)
- Kenyon Hopkins, The Sound of New York (ABC-Paramount, 1959)
- Kenyon Hopkins, The Hustler (Kapp, 1961)
- Jackie & Roy, The Glory of Love (ABC-Paramount, 1956)
- Illinois Jacquet, Illinois Jacquet (Epic, 1963)
- Illinois Jacquet, Illinois Jacquet Flies Again (Jazz Legacy, 1978)
- Bobby Jaspar, Bobby Jaspar Quintet (Columbia, 1956)
- Eddie Jefferson, Letter from Home (Riverside, 1962)
- J. J. Johnson, Goodies (RCA Victor, 1965)
- Osie Johnson, A Bit of the Blues (RCA Victor, 1956)
- Hank Jones, The Talented Touch (Capitol, 1958)
- Hank Jones, Gigi (Golden Crest, 1958)
- Thad Jones/Mel Lewis Orchestra, Central Park North (Solid State, 1969)
- Sheila Jordan, Portrait of Sheila (Blue Note, 1962)
- Beverly Kenney, Come Swing with Me (Roost, 1956)
- Morgana King, Sings the Blues (Mercury, 1957)
- Morgana King, With a Taste of Honey (Mainstream, 1964)
- Morgana King, A Taste of Honey (Mainstream, 1971)
- Steve Kuhn and Toshiko Akiyoshi, The Country and Western Sound of Jazz Pianos (Dauntless, 1963)
- Gene Krupa, Gene Krupa Plays Gerry Mulligan Arrangements (American Jazz Classics, 1959)
- John LaPorta, 3 Moods (Debut, 1955)
- Michel Legrand, Legrand Jazz (Columbia, 1958)
- Michel Legrand, Michel Legrand Meets Miles Davis (Philips, 1970)
- John Lewis, The John Lewis Piano (Atlantic, 1957)
- Mel Lewis & Thad Jones, Thad Jones & Mel Lewis (LRC, 1990)
- Mundell Lowe, Satan in High Heels (soundtrack) (Charlie Parker, 1961)
- Gloria Lynne, Lonely and Sentimental (Everest, 1959)
- Gary McFarland and Clark Terry, Tijuana Jazz (Impulse!, 1966)
- Jimmy McGriff, The Big Band (Solid, State 1966)
- Jimmy McGriff, A Bag Full of Blues (Solid State, 1967)
- Mary Ann McCall, Melancholy Baby (Coral, 1959)
- Marian McPartland, Marian McPartland and Trio (From the Jazz Vault, 1979)
- Charles Mingus, East Coasting (Essential Jazz Classics, 2010)
- Hal Mooney, Woodwinds and Percussion (Mercury, 1961)
- Marilyn Moore, Moody (Bethlehem, 1959)
- Don Morrow, Grimm's Hip Fairy Tales As Dug by Don Morrow (Roulette, 1961)
- Sam Most, I'm Nuts About the Most....Sam That Is! (Bethlehem, 1955)
- Tony Mottola, String Band Strum-Along (Command, 1961)
- Martin Mull, Normal (Capricorn, 1974)
- Mark Murphy, Rah (Riverside, 1961)
- Oliver Nelson, Impressions of Phaedra (United Artists Jazz, 1962)
- Oliver Nelson, Oliver Nelson Plays Michelle (Impulse!, 1966)
- Portia Nelson, Let Me Love You (New Sound 1956)
- Joe Newman, Salute to Satch (RCA Victor, 1956)
- Anita O'Day, All the Sad Young Men (Verve, 1962)
- Oscar Peterson, With Respect to Nat (Limelight, 1965)
- Paul Quinichette, Moods (EmArcy, 1954)
- Jackie Paris, The Song Is Paris (Impulse!, 1962)
- Bucky Pizzarelli, Playing Bix Beiderbecke & Bill Challis and Carl Kress & Dick McDonough (Monmouth Evergreen, 1974)
- Tito Puente, Puente Goes Jazz (RCA, 1990)
- Joe Puma, Joe Puma (Bethlehem, 1955)
- Joe Puma, Like Tweet Jazz Versions of Authentic Bird Calls (Columbia, 1961)
- Lucy Reed, This Is Lucy Reed (Fantasy, 1957)
- Rita Reys, Sylvia Pierce & Peggy Serra, New Voices (Dawn, 1957)
- Aaron Sachs, Quintette (Solid, 2013)
- Felicia Sanders, That Certain Feeling (Decca, 1958)
- Sauter-Finegan Orchestra, Straight Down the Middle (RCA Victor, 1958)
- Gunther Schuller & George Russell, Modern Jazz Concert (Columbia, 1958)
- Raymond Scott, Raymond Scott Conducts the Rock 'n' Roll Symphony (Everest, 1958)
- Raymond Scott, Amor (Everest, 1960)
- Shirley Scott, Great Scott!! (Impulse!, 1964)
- Shirley Scott, Everybody Loves a Lover (Impulse!, 1964)
- Tony Scott, The Touch of Tony Scott (RCA Victor, 1956)
- Tommy Shepard, Shepard's Flock (Coral, 1957)
- Zoot Sims, New Beat Bossa Nova Means the Samba Swings Vol. 2 (Colpix, 1962)
- Carol Sloane, Out of the Blue (Columbia, 1962)
- Jimmy Smith, Bashin': The Unpredictable Jimmy Smith (Verve, 1962)
- Jimmy Smith, Hoochie Coochie Man (Verve, 1966)
- Johnny Smith, Guitar and Strings Royal (Roost, 1960)
- Johnny Smith, The Johnny Smith Stan Getz Years (Roulette, 1978)
- Rex Stewart and Cootie Williams, Porgy & Bess Revisited (Warner Bros., 1959)
- Sonny Stitt, The Matadors Meet the Bull (Roulette, 1965)
- Gábor Szabó, Gypsy '66 (Impulse!, 1965)
- Billy Taylor, David Frost Presents OK Billy (Philips, 1970)
- Lynn Taylor, I See Your Face Before Me (LPTime, 1958)
- Jack Teagarden, Think Well of Me (Verve, 1962)
- Clark Terry and Chico O'Farrill, Spanish Rice (Impulse!, 1966)
- Toots Thielemans, Yesterday & Today (Out of the Blue/Universal, 2012)
- Claude Thornhill, The Uncollected Claude Thornhill and His Orchestra (Hindsight, 1977)
- Stanley Turrentine, Always Something There (Blue Note, 1968)
- Sarah Vaughan, Vol. 1: Night Song (Mercury, 1964)
- Dinah Washington, For Those in Love (EmArcy, 1955)
- Dinah Washington, The Swingin' Miss D (EmArcy, 1957)
- Bob Wilber, Spreadin' Joy (Classic Jazz, 1976)
- Lee Wiley, The Songs of Rodgers and Hart (Jazztone, 1956)
- Lee Wiley, A Touch of the Blues (RCA, 1958)
- Andy Williams, Young at Heart (SSJ, 2011)
- Cootie Williams, Cootie Williams in Hi-Fi (RCA Victor, 1958)
- George Williams, Rhythm Was His Business (RCA Victor, 1985)
- Joe Williams, Me and the Blues (RCA Victor, 1964)
- Julie Wilson, Love (Dolphin, 1956)
- Emily Yancy, Yancy (Mainstream, 1965)
