= Collaboration (Helen Merrill and Gil Evans album) =

Studio album by Helen Merrill
- Released: 1988
- Recorded: August 18, 25 & 26, 1987
- Studio: Clinton Recording Studio, New York, NY
- Genre: Jazz
- Length: 44:01
- Label: EmArcy, Nippon Phonogram
- Producer: Kiyoshi "Boxman" Koyama, Helen Merrill

Helen Merrill chronology
| Music Makers (1986) | Collaboration (1988) | Helen Merrill Sings Cole Porter (1988) |

Gil Evans chronology
| Live at Sweet Basil Vol. 2 (1987) | Collaboration (1987) | Bud and Bird (1987) |

Collaboration is a 1987 studio album by Helen Merrill, arranged by Gil Evans. With the almost identical repertoire of recorded songs –though in another order– and following Evans' original scores it is a celebratory re-recording of their previous collaboration from 30 years ago for Merrill's album Dream of You, released in 1957 also on EmArcy. The one exception is the opener, "Summertime" from Porgy and Bess, that Evans recorded with Miles Davis in 1958, it replaces "You're Lucky to Me". Like Dream of You Collaboration was recorded on three consecutive recording sessions each with a different line-up, one with woodwinds and trombone for most songs, featuring soprano saxophonist Steve Lacy on two tracks, one session with brass and another with a string section and woodwind.

== Reception ==
Professional ratings
Review scores
| Source | Rating |
|---|---|
| AllMusic | 4/5 stars |
| The Penguin Guide to Jazz | 3/4 stars |

The AllMusic review by Scott Yanow awarded the album four and a half stars and said "This inspired outing, one of the most rewarding sets of Helen Merrill's later years, was also one of Evans' last great dates and one of his few post-1972 classics. 57 at the time, Merrill is in superb form on such numbers as 'Where Flamingos Fly,' 'A New Town Is a Blue Town,' 'By Myself' and 'Anyplace I Hang My Hat Is Home.'" The Penguin Guide to Jazz described the album as "One of the strangest singer-and-orchestra records ever made", and highlighted the slow tempos, "barely moving textures" and "long, carefully held tones of the vocalist".

== Track listing ==
1. "Summertime" (George Gershwin, DuBose Heyward) – 4:27
2. "Where Flamingos Fly" (John Benson Brooks, Harold Courlander, Elthea Peale) – 3:07
3. "Dream of You" (Sy Oliver, Jimmie Lunceford, Michael Morales) – 2:51
4. "I'm a Fool to Want You" (Joel Herron, Jack Wolf, Frank Sinatra) – 4:30
5. "Troubled Waters" (Arthur Johnston, Sam Coslow) – 3:26
6. "I'm Just a Lucky So and So" (Duke Ellington, Mack David) – 3:09
7. "People Will Say We're in Love" (Richard Rodgers, Oscar Hammerstein II) – 2:49
8. "By Myself" (Arthur Schwartz, Howard Dietz) – 3:38
9. "Any Place I Hang My Hat Is Home" (Harold Arlen, Johnny Mercer) – 4:55
10. "I've Never Seen" (Don Marcotte) – 4:19
11. "He Was Too Good to Me" (Rodgers, Lorenz Hart) – 3:15
12. "A New Town Is a Blue Town" (Jerry Ross, Richard Adler) – 3:35

== Personnel ==
- Helen Merrill – vocals
- Gil Evans – arranger, conductor

The Gil Evans Orchestra

Tracks 1, 2, 6, 9 and 12, session of August 25, 1987

- Steve Lacy – soprano saxophone (as special guest on 1 and 9 only)
- Danny Bank – flute, bass clarinet
- Phil Bodner – flute, alto flute, bass clarinet
- Jerry Dodgion – flute, soprano saxophone
- Chris Hunter – flute, clarinet, [soprano sax)
- Wally Kane – bass clarinet, bassoon (except 12)
- Roger Rosenberg – bass clarinet (12)
- Jimmy Knepper – trombone
- Gil Goldstein – piano, keyboards
- Joe Beck – guitar
- Buster Williams – double bass
- Mel Lewis – drums, percussion

Tracks 3, 7 and 8, session of August 26, 1987

- Lew Soloff – trumpet
- Shunzo Ohno – trumpet, flugelhorn
- Jimmy Knepper – trombone
- Dave Taylor – bass trombone
- Chris Hunter – soprano saxophone, alto saxophone, piccolo
- Danny Bank – baritone saxophone
- Gil Goldstein – piano, keyboards
- Joe Beck – guitar
- Buster Williams – double bass
- Mel Lewis – drums

Tracks 4, 5, 10 and 11, session of August 18, 1987

- String quintet
  - Harry Lookofsky – violin, tenor violin
  - Lamar Alsop – viola, violin
  - Harold Coletta, Theodore Israel – viola
  - Jesse Levy – cello
- Phil Bodner – woodwinds
- Gil Goldstein – piano, keyboards
- Jay Berliner – guitar
- Buster Williams – double bass
- Mel Lewis – drums

Production

- Kiyoshi "Boxman" Koyama, Helen Merrill – producers
- Tom Lazarus – recording and mix engineer
- Rebecca Everett – second engineer
- Dan Morgenstern – liner notes
