= Brownie: Homage to Clifford Brown =

Studio album by Helen Merrill
- Released: 1994
- Recorded: January 21–23, 1994
- Genre: Jazz
- Length: 62:47
- Label: Verve
- Producer: Helen Merrill, Jean-Philippe Allard

Helen Merrill chronology
| Helen Merrill with Strings (1994) | Brownie: Homage to Clifford Brown (1994) | You and the Night and the Music (1998) |

Brownie: Homage to Clifford Brown is an album by Helen Merrill, recorded in tribute to the trumpeter Clifford Brown.

Merrill had recorded an album with Brown in 1954.

== Reception ==
Professional ratings
Review scores
| Source | Rating |
|---|---|
| AllMusic | 4.5/5 stars |
| The Penguin Guide to Jazz | 4/4 stars |

AllMusic reviewer Scott Yanow stated: "Throughout the often emotional date, Helen Merrill is heard in top form, giving plenty of feeling to the lyrics while leaving room for the guest trumpeters". The Penguin Guide to Jazz described it as a "classic session [... that] acted as a superb vehicle for Merrill's individual approach to time".

== Track listing ==
1. "Your Eyes" (Clifford Brown, Helen Merrill) – 6:17
2. "Daahoud" (Clifford Brown) – 2:58
3. "(I Was) Born to Be Blue" (Mel Tormé, Bob Wells) – 5:16
4. "I Remember Clifford" (Benny Golson, Jon Hendricks) – 7:00
5. "Joy Spring" (Brown) – 3:59
6. "I'll Remember April" (Gene de Paul, Patricia Johnston, Don Raye) – 7:14
7. "Don't Explain" (Arthur Herzog Jr., Billie Holiday) – 6:18
8. "Brownie" (Torrie Zito) – 5:04
9. "You'd Be So Nice to Come Home To" (Cole Porter) – 4:33
10. "I'll Be Seeing You" (Sammy Fain, Irving Kahal) – 4:53
11. "Memories of You" (Eubie Blake, Andy Razaf) – 3:52
12. "Gone with the Wind" (Herb Magidson, Allie Wrubel) – 2:28
13. "Largo" (Samuel Barber, Antonín Dvořák) – 2:55

== Personnel ==
Musicians

- Helen Merrill – vocals
- Roy Hargrove – flugelhorn, trumpet
- Tom Harrell
- Wallace Roney – trumpet
- Lew Soloff
- Roy Soloff
- Torrie Zito – arranger, director, keyboards, music direction
- Kenny Barron – piano
- Rufus Reid – double bass
- Victor Lewis – drums

Production

- Helen Merrill – producer
- Patrice Beauséjour – art direction
- Mark Agostino – assistant engineer
- Brian Kinkland
- Arthur Friedman
- Jay Newland – engineer, mastering, mixing
- Aissa Martin – hair stylist, make-up
- Beth Kelly – photography
- Cheung Ching Ming
- Jean-Philippe Allard – producer
