= Walter Goodman (critic) =

American journalist (1927–2002)

- Born: August 22, 1927; New York City, New York, U.S.
- Died: March 6, 2002 (aged 74); Valhalla, New York, U.S.
- Writing career
- Language: English
- Genres: Television criticism, journalism

Walter Goodman (August 22, 1927 – March 6, 2002) was an American author and journalist for The New York Times and worked as the newspaper's television critic concentrating on news and documentaries. His 1968 book The Committee chronicled the House Un-American Activities Committee.

== Background and career ==
Walter Goodman was born in the Bronx, New York. He had one sibling, Daniel. Goodman graduated as a journalism major from Syracuse University.

Goodman worked at the Foreign Broadcast Information Service (logo).

Goodman moved to London as an editor for the Foreign Broadcast Information Service, a bureau of the American Central Intelligence Agency that monitored radio news content.

He returned to New York and held positions writing and editing for magazines such as The New Republic, Redbook, Newsweek and Harper's.

In 1960, Goodman moved his family to Chicago to become the first full-time articles editor for Playboy, which was making a strong push to publish serious nonfiction articles. "Goodman knew the critics and the politico-literary establishment, and where and how their work could be bought," wrote Thomas Weyr in his book Reaching for Paradise: The Playboy Vision of America. "As articles editor, Goodman would have the greatest immediate impact on a changing content."

Goodman returned to New York after a year but remained Playboy's Books Editor for several years. He then took positions at The New York Times, Newsweek and WNET television. He finished his career at The New York Times as a critic, increasingly specializing on television, with a focus on news and documentary programs.

In 1972, Goodman (with his wife, Elaine) received a Christopher Award for the book The Rights of the People. He received a Guggenheim Fellowship in 1978 in the General Nonfiction category.

Goodman was a frequent television interviewee, with three interviews by Richard Heffner on The Open Mind on WNET, New York. The three half-hour interviews can be seen on the archive Web site of The Open Mind.

The Forbes Media Guide Five Hundred, 1994 states:

Intelligently covering TV, Goodman always delves beneath the surface with originality and wisdom. He analyzes what's on, who produces it, and who watches it. But he mixes heavy prose with a wit so dry it often fails to amuse, and his cerebral style weighs down, his complex, cynical pronouncements about what's wrong with the world. ... Goodman reliably reviews documentaries and other challenging TV fare, providing a valuable resource to intelligent viewers.

== Works ==
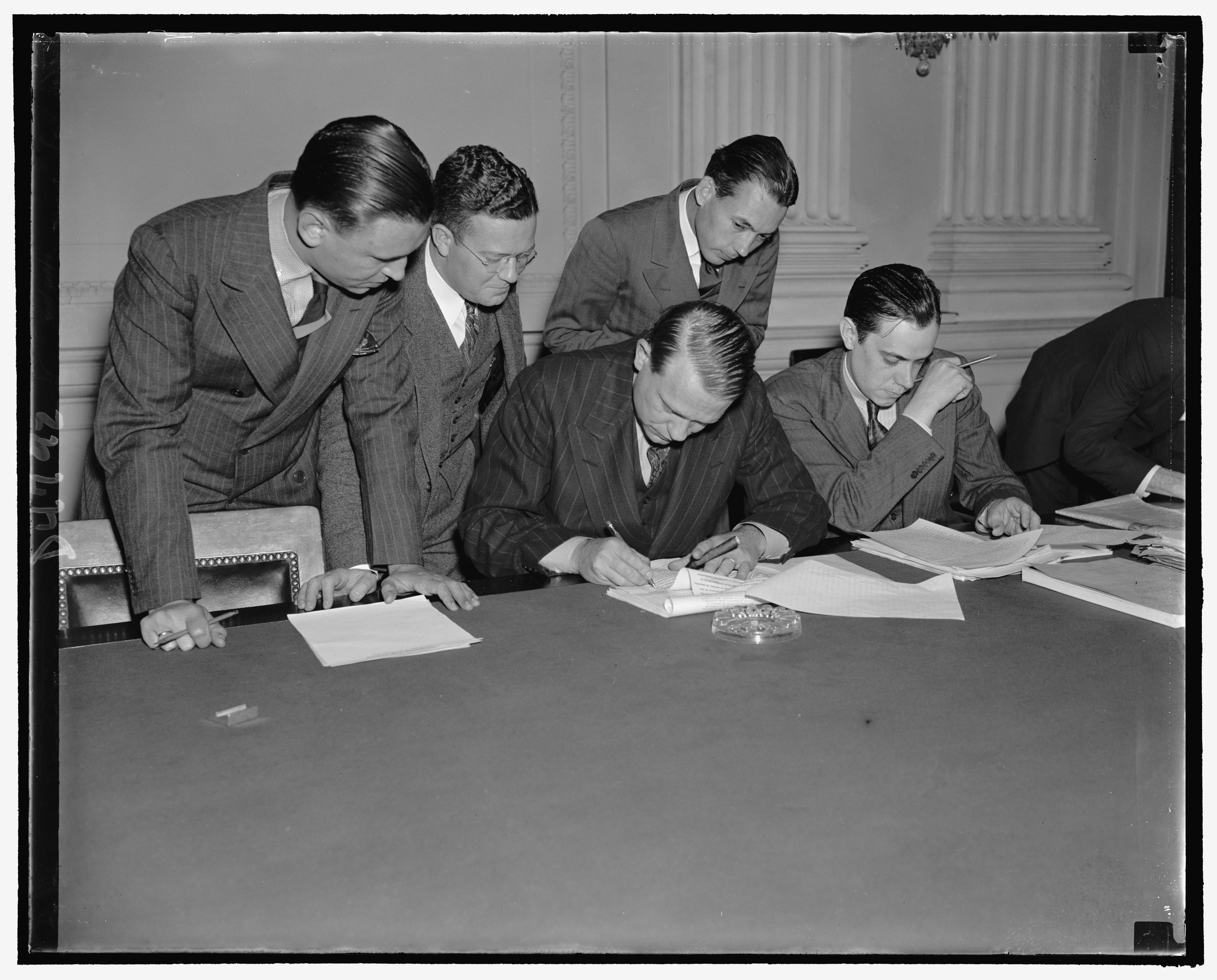
HUAC chairman Martin Dies Jr. proofs a letter replying to President FDR's attack on the committee on October 26, 1938.

Goodman wrote nine books, several children's books, and many magazine articles.

His book The Committee, a critical history of the House Committee on Un-American Activities, appeared in print in 1968. Arthur M. Schlesinger Jr. criticized the book for lack of sympathy for damage done to some witnesses. Overall, he called the book "a glorious piece of Americana."

== Personal life and death ==
Goodman married Elaine Egan; they had two sons: Hal, born 1954, and Bennet, born 1956.

Goodman died aged 74 on March 6, 2002, of kidney failure.

== Bibliography ==
- Clowns of Commerce (1957)
- All Honorable Men (1963)
- The Committee: The Extraordinary Career of the House Committee on Un-American Activities (1968)
- Black Bondage: The Life of Slaves in the South (1969)
- Percentage of the Take (1971)
- Rights of the People: The Major Decisions of the Warren Court with Elaine Goodman (1971)
- Memoirs of a Scam Man: The Life and Deals of Patsy Anthony Lepera with Patsy Anthony Lepera (1974)
- Family: Yesterday, Today, Tomorrow with Elaine Goodman (1975)
