= You and the Night and the Music (Helen Merrill album) =

You and The Night and The Music

Studio album by Helen Merrill
- Released: May 12, 1998
- Recorded: 1998
- Genre: Vocal jazz
- Length: 54:43
- Label: Verve
- Producer: Helen Merrill, Jean-Philippe Allard, Jay Newland, Daniel Richard

Helen Merrill chronology
Brownie: Homage to Clifford Brown (1995)	You and The Night and The Music (1998)	Jelena Ana Milcactic a.k.a. Helen Merrill (2000)

You and The Night and The Music is a 1998 studio album by Helen Merrill.

== Reception ==
Professional ratings
Review scores
Source	Rating
Allmusic	3/5 stars

Allmusic reviewer Stephen Thomas Erlewine said the album is a "wonderful collection of standards, augmented by two originals from Helen Merrill and Torrie Zito. Merrill's voice hasn't weakened much over the years, and there's true warmth to her performances on this album...There's a relaxed charm to the music that helps make You and the Night and the Music one of her better latter-day efforts".

== Track listing ==
1. "Song of Delilah" (Victor Young, Ray Evans, Jay Livingston) - 4:16
2. "Beautiful Love (Love Is LikeThis)" (Haven Gillespie, Young) - 5:20
3. "And in You Came" (Helen Merrill, Torrie Zito) - 4:23
4. "Ill Wind" (Harold Arlen, Ted Koehler) - 3:03
5. "I Want to Be Happy" (Irving Caesar, Vincent Youmans) - 3:58
6. "My Funny Valentine" (Lorenz Hart, Richard Rodgers) - 4:23
7. "You and the Night and the Music" (Howard Dietz, Arthur Schwartz) - 3:45
8. "Young and Foolish" (Albert Hague, Arnold B. Horwitt) - 6:47
9. "Don't Leave Me Alone" (Merrill, Zito) - 3:28
10. "All of Me" (Gerald Marks, Seymour Simons) - 4:14
11. "Street of Dreams" (Victor Young, Sam M. Lewis) - 4:10

== Personnel ==
- Helen Merrill - liner notes, producer, vocals
- Tom Harrell - flugelhorn, trumpet
- Bob Milikan - trumpet
- Masabumi Kikuchi - piano
- Torrie Zito - piano, electric piano
- Charlie Haden - double bass
- Paul Motian - drums

Production

- Jean-Philippe Allard - producer
- Jay Newland - engineer, mastering, mixing
- Daniel Richard - executive producer
- Joe Lizzi - assistant engineer
- Maureen Murphy - coordination
- Patrick Votan
