= The Trap (American TV series) =

American TV dramatic anthology series (1950)

The Trap is an hour-long American television dramatic anthology series about people who found themselves in situations of which they had lost control. It was broadcast on CBS from 9 to 10 p.m. Eastern Time on Saturdays from April 29, 1950. through June 24, 1950. Franklin Heller was the producer, and Yul Brynner and Byron Paul directed with alternating units.

Joseph DeSantis was its host and narrator. Nine 60-minute episodes aired live on CBS in 1950. Its notable stars, many early in their careers, included Kim Stanley, E.G. Marshall, Leslie Nielsen, and George Reeves.

The premiere episode was "Puzzle for Fiends" with George Keane.

== Critical response ==
A review in the trade publication Variety said that the concept of scheduling an hour-long dramatic series against the musical Saturday Night Review on NBC seemed good for viewers who preferred a different type of program. However, it added that "Puzzle for Fiends" was a weak beginning. Although the episode was "excellently cast and well directed and performed", the review said that the story was "preposterous". The review complimented Keane and Stanley for their performances.
