= Dream of You (Helen Merrill album) =

1957 studio album by Helen Merrill

Studio album by Helen Merrill
- Released: 1957
- Recorded: July 26, 1956 – February 27, 1957
- Genre: Jazz
- Length: 57:30
- Label: EmArcy
- Producer: Bob Shad

Helen Merrill chronology
Helen Merrill with Strings (1955)	Dream of You (1957)	Merrill at Midnight (1957)

Dream of You is a studio album by Helen Merrill, which was arranged and conducted by Gil Evans. This recording immediately preceded Miles Ahead, Evans' 1957 collaboration with Miles Davis. In 1987, Merrill and Evans reunited to record new versions of the same songs for the album Collaboration. The 1992 CD reissue of Dream of You includes additional tracks arranged and conducted by Johnny Richards, not Gil Evans.

== Reception ==
Professional ratings
Review scores
Source	Rating
AllMusic	4/5 stars
Tom Hull – on the Web	B+

The AllMusic review by Stephen Cook stated: "On 1955's Dream of You ... Merrill found reconciliation, sounding both melodramatic and swinging within Gil Evans' darkly spacious, yet economical arrangements. Suitably, torchy ballads are prominent. ... The programmatic quality of Merrill's coyly sensual voice and Evans' slightly askew, bubbling reeds and languid rhythm conjure up dramatic, balmy southern scenes á la Tennessee Williams."

== Track listing ==
1. "People Will Say We're in Love" (Oscar Hammerstein II, Richard Rodgers) - 2:34
2. "By Myself" (Howard Dietz, Arthur Schwartz) - 3:23
3. "Any Place I Hang My Hat Is Home" (Harold Arlen, Johnny Mercer) - 4:10
4. "I've Never Seen" (Don Marcotte) - 3:33
5. "He Was Too Good to Me" (Lorenz Hart, Rodgers) - 3:01
6. "A New Town Is a Blue Town" (Richard Adler, Jerry Ross) - 3:09
7. "You're Lucky to Me" (Eubie Blake, Andy Razaf) - 3:25
8. "Where Flamingos Fly" (John Benson Brooks, Harold Courlander, Elthea Peale) - 2:44
9. "Dream of You" (Jimmie Lunceford, Michael Morales, Sy Oliver) - 2:53
10. "I'm a Fool to Want You" (Frank Sinatra, Joel Herron, Jack Wolf) - 4:06
11. "I'm Just a Lucky So and So" (Mack David, Duke Ellington) - 3:08
12. "Troubled Waters" (Sam Coslow, Arthur Johnston) - 3:14

1992 bonus tracks (Arranged by Johnny Richards)

1. "Alone Together" (Master Take) (Dietz, Schwartz) - 3:11
2. "Alone Together" (Alternate Take) - 3:10
3. "Glad to Be Unhappy" (Hart, Rodgers) - 2:50
4. "This Is My Night Cry" (Bill Sanford, Phil Medley) - 3:06
5. "How's the World Treating You?" (Alternate Take) (Boudleaux Bryant, Chet Atkins) - 2:57
6. "How's the World Treating You?" (Master Take) - 2:56

== Personnel ==
- Helen Merrill - vocals
- Gil Evans - arranger, conductor
- John LaPorta - clarinet, alto saxophone
- Jerome Richardson - flute, alto saxophone, tenor saxophone
- Danny Bank - baritone saxophone
- Art Farmer, Louis Mucci - trumpet
- Jimmy Cleveland, Joe Bennett - trombone
- Hank Jones - piano
- Janet Putnam - harp
- Barry Galbraith - guitar
- Oscar Pettiford - double bass
- Joe Morello - drums
- Johnny Richards - arranger, conductor (CD bonus tracks only)

=== Production ===
- Bob Shad - producer

1992 Reissue

- Michael Lang - supervisor
- Will Friedwald - music research
- Kiyoshi "Boxman" Koyama - tape research
- Andrew Nicholas - remastering
- Peter Pullman - liner notes
- Cliff Preiss - additional production assistant
