= American Country Songs =

Studio album by Helen Merrill
- Released: November 1959
- Genre: Country
- Length: 32:43
- Label: Atco

Helen Merrill chronology
You've Got a Date with the Blues (1959)	American Country Songs (1959)	Parole e musica (1960)

American Country Songs is the seventh studio album by American singer Helen Merrill, released in November 1959 through Atco Records. For the album, the singer chose not the usual jazz, but country material, recording twelve songs, four of which belong to the founder of the genre, Hank Williams.

== Critical reception ==
Professional ratings
Review scores
Source	Rating
AllMusic	2/5 stars
The Encyclopedia of Popular Music	2/5 stars
Tom Hull – on the Web	B

Billboard magazine wrote: "The jazz thrush turns to a series of smartly selected country tunes for her latest album. They're rendered in lush, pop fashion with excellent ork support from Chuck Sagle. Such chestnuts as 'Half As Much,' 'You Win Again' and 'Cold, Cold Heart' are included. Package is highlighted by a lovely cover photo of the lark. Sound is excellent." Cash Box magazine noted how Miss Merrill, a mostly jazz singer, chose a dozen excellent songs and translated them into her own personal language of sophistication. Ralph J. Gleason from HiFi/Stereo Review stated that Miss Merrill is the last person he would imagine performing country music by Hank Williams, however, in his opinion, already in the first track she proves that she has a natural approach to these songs and as a result it turns out one of the best collections of this kind of material.

== Track listing ==
1. "Maybe Tomorrow" (Don Everly, Phil Everly) – 2:35
2. "I'm So Lonesome I Could Cry" (Hank Williams) – 2:09
3. "You Don't Know Me" (Cindy Walker, Eddy Arnold) – 2:19
4. "Condemned Without Trial" (Don Robertson, Hal Blair) – 2:26
5. "You Win Again" (Hank Williams) – 2:25
6. "I'm Here to Get My Baby Out of Jail" (Harty Taylor, Karl Davis) – 4:17
7. "A Heart Full of Love" (Eddy Arnold, Ray Soehnel, Steve Nelson) – 3:02
8. "Cold, Cold Heart" (Hank Williams) – 2:37
9. "Devoted to You" (Boudleaux Bryant) – 2:19
10. "My Heart Would Know" (Hank Williams) – 2:25
11. "Any Time" (Herbert Lawson) – 2:39
12. "Half as Much" (Curley Williams) – 2:28
