= Jelena Ana Milcetic a.k.a. Helen Merrill =

Jelena Ana Milcetić a.k.a. Helen Merrill

Studio album by Helen Merrill
- Released: January 18, 2000
- Recorded: 1999
- Genre: Vocal jazz
- Length: 53:13
- Label: Verve

Helen Merrill chronology
You and the Night and the Music (1998)	Jelena Ana Milcetić a.k.a. Helen Merrill (2000)	Lilac Wine (2003)

Jelena Ana Milcetić a.k.a. Helen Merrill is a 2000 studio album by Helen Merrill. The album is a tribute to Merrill's Croatian heritage.

== Reception ==
Professional ratings
Review scores
Source	Rating
Allmusic	4.5/5 stars

The Allmusic review by Alex Henderson awarded the album four and a half stars and said it was a "Helen Merrill has never been afraid to take chances, but the veteran jazz singer is especially ambitious on Jelena Ana Milcetić, an autobiographical (or at least semi-autobiographical) work that draws on jazz, pop, and folk as well as traditional Croatian music...But as unpredictable and eclectic as this album is, the CD never sounds confused or aimless...everything fits together perfectly. Jelena Ana Milcetić is among Merrill's most impressive accomplishments".

== Track listing ==
1. "Kirje" - 3:15
2. "Imagining Krk" - 2:15
3. "Long, Long Ago" (Thomas Haynes Bayly) - 4:35
4. "My Father" (Judy Collins) - 7:18
5. "La Paloma" (Sebastián Iradier) - 5:57
6. "Tanac" (Traditional) - 1:41
7. "Wayfarin' Stranger" (Traditional) - 4:26
8. "I'll Take You Home Again, Kathleen" (Thomas P. Westendorf) - 5:30
9. "Lost in the Stars" (Kurt Weill, Maxwell Anderson) - 5:19
10. "Sometimes I Feel Like a Motherless Child" (Traditional) - 5:36
11. "Among My Souvenirs" (Edgar Leslie, Lawrence Wright) - 3:47
12. "Nobody Knows" (Alan Bergman, Marilyn Bergman, Michel Legrand) - 2:33
13. "Ti si rajski cvijet (You Are a Flower from Paradise)" - 1:01

== Personnel ==
- Helen Merrill - vocals
- Dominic Cortese - accordion
- Gil Goldstein - accordion, arranger, piano
- Torrie Zito - arranger, conductor, Fender Rhodes
- Jesse Levy - cello
- Frank Zuback - conductor
- George Mraz - double bass
- Jeff Mironov - guitar
- Gloria Agostini - harp
- Dennis Anderson - English horn, oboe
- Steve Kroon - percussion
- Roland Hanna - piano
- Steve Lacy - soprano saxophone
