= Andy Roberts (singer) =

American jazz musician

- Born: Andrew Robert Pugh; January 10, 1926; Fort Monroe, Virginia, U.S.
- Died: May 24, 2017 (aged 91); Virginia Beach, Virginia, U.S.
- Education: Phoebus Junior High School; Hampton High School; VPI
- Occupations: Singer, weather presenter, voice actor
- Spouse: Dorothy Marie Lucy
- Children: 3

Andrew Robert Pugh (born January 10, 1926 – May 24, 2017); known professionally as Andy Roberts, was an American jazz singer, active during the decade following World War II, known for his work with Skitch Henderson and the Sauter-Finegan Orchestra, and as one of the featured vocalists on the groundbreaking late-night comedy-variety television series, Broadway Open House. He was later the weatherman at WTKR-TV for more than 30 years, and, for almost as long, a much-employed and widely heard radio voice-over artist.

== Early life and career ==
Born in Fort Monroe, Virginia on January 10, 1926, Roberts was the son of Rena Maud (née Cascadden) and career Army officer, Maj. Roy Pugh. He attended the Fort Monroe Post School, Phoebus Junior High School, and Hampton High School, graduating in 1943.

Ten years earlier (i.e. May 1933), in what, at age 7, may well have been the future crooner's first public performance, "little Andy Pugh sang two numbers" at the monthly business meeting of the Fort Monroe Community Club. The following February, Pugh portrayed one of the "Hurdy-Gurdy children" in two performances of the light operetta, Going to the Fair, featuring students of the post school.

After high school, a single term at VPI preceded Pugh's entry into the United States Navy. Stationed initially at Bainbridge, Maryland for basic training, and later at Daytona Beach, he was discharged in summer of 1946. Back at Fort Monroe, he performed in a talent show staged to entertain the troops stationed there. That fall, he moved to Manhattan, eventually auditioning for, and receiving some invaluable career guidance from Morton Downey musical director Carmen Mastren, setting the stage for the "crooning crabber['s]" professional debut.

In 1947, Roberts was heard–and promptly hired–by bandleader Skitch Henderson, remaining with the orchestra until 1950, at which time Roberts joined his boss on the latter's new NBC morning radio show, which featured the bandleader spinning discs and his erstwhile vocalist portraying Fenwick, the talking piano, a wisecracking sidekick whose unforeseen popularity was reflected both in substantial quantities of fan mail and the fact that he was soon heard delivering NBC station breaks. Regarding the character, Roberts remarked, "Fenwick would be highly incensed if anyone called him a Cockney.

He's a very high class English gentleman. And he doesn't sing. He's sort of a wise guy who gives punny answers to the questions Skitch asks him. Skitch'll ask him, 'How are you feeling this morning, Fenwick?' And Fenwick will say, 'All keyed up, sir.'"

That year, Roberts was also performing on The Ted Steele Show, where he was heard by arrangers Eddie Sauter and Bill Finegan, resulting in a number of recordings and extensive touring with their eponymous orchestra over the next five years.

Beginning on March 12, 1956, Roberts hosted his own "informal variety program", The Andy Roberts Show, airing Monday through Friday in Norfolk on WTAR. With cast members including female vocalist Lee Brodie, pianist Vince Pafumi, guitarist Ted "Turk" Refit, bassist George Farrar, and drummer Bob Hollowell, the show continued to air in some form at least as late as October 1957, (Note: By October 24, for example, the show had been reduced to a 15-minute slot, following one 5-minute news segment, "Farm News", and preceding two others, entitled "Local News" and "Walter Cronkite", respectively.) Beginning in June 1958, Roberts spent approximately one year as a featured vocalist on The Morty Nevins Show.

In the meantime, on June 23, 1956, Roberts had made what would, in retrospect, become a bit of TV trivia history by becoming the last of the victorious, $1,000-winning contestants on the long-running TV talent contest, Chance of a Lifetime—and doing so not merely on the final episode, but with a three-week, three thousand dollar winning steak, beginning on the ninth and concluding with the series' June 23 finale.

During this period and continuing into the early 1960s, Roberts filled a variety of roles at WTAR, such sportscasting, hosting broadcasts of vintage movies, and hosting—and occasionally performing–on television specials.

In the spring of 1961, Roberts became WTAR's weatherman, a position he held for more than 30 years, retiring in 1992. The following year, an article by Daily Press reporter Dave Nicholson revealed that, for the majority of those years, unbeknownst to his TV audience, Roberts had—since the company's inception in 1966—simultaneously been one of Norfolk-based recording and production company Studio Center's busiest and most contented employees, a radio voice actor working primarily on commercials. In that article, Roberts revealed how gratifying he found this line of work, and explained why.

I enjoy it better than anything I've done in my life. When I was a kid, I stood up in front of the class and recited a poem. It was such a thrill, because everyone was listening to me.

Roberts continued his work with Studio Center—interspersed with at least one notable TV guest appearance (Note: This was the 1995 special, Gone But Not Forgotten, a locally produced documentary about Hampton Roads of the 1940s and '50s, said to combine "nostalgia with a hard look at some of the injustices that existed between blacks and whites", featuring the recollections of former Newport News mayor Jessie Rattley and "excellent narration by Andy Roberts".)—for several years after his official 1992 retirement.

== Personal life and death ==
From 1955 until his death, Roberts was married to Dorothy Marie Lucy, with whom he had three children.

On May 24, 2017, Roberts died in Virginia Beach, Virginia at age 91. Pre-deceased by his son, Andrew "Charlie" Roberts, he was survived by his wife and two daughters.
