= Music Makers (album) =

Studio album by Helen Merrill
- Released: 1986
- Recorded: March 1986
- Genre: Jazz
- Length: 47:39
- Label: Owl
- Producer: Jean-Jacques Pussiau, Francois LeMaire

Helen Merrill chronology
| No Tears, No Goodbyes (1984) | Music Makers (1986) | Collaboration (1986) |

Music Makers is an album by Helen Merrill. It was recorded in March 1986 and released by Owl Records.

== Reception ==
Professional ratings
Review scores
| Source | Rating |
|---|---|
| AllMusic | 4/5 stars |
| The Penguin Guide to Jazz | 3.5/4 stars |

The AllMusic review by Scott Yanow awarded the album four stars and said "all of the songs sound quite fresh, partly due to the unusual instrumentation and also partly because of the players' inventiveness". The Penguin Guide to Jazz contrasted the playing of Steve Lacy and Stéphane Grappelli: "The saxophonist's playing seems as private as Merrill's own path through the lyrics, whereas Grappelli offers an antidote by pouring on the Gallic charm".

== Track listing ==
1. "'Round Midnight" (Bernie Hanighen, Thelonious Monk, Cootie Williams) - 5:56
2. "Sometimes I Feel Like a Motherless Child" (Traditional) - 4:28
3. "A Tout Choisir" (Joël Holmès) - 2:08
4. "When Lights Are Low" (Benny Carter, Spencer Williams) - 3:28
5. "And Still She Is With Me" (Gordon Beck) - 4:52
6. "Music Makers" (Helen Merrill, Torrie Zito) - 3:11
7. "Laura" (Johnny Mercer, David Raksin) - 4:30
8. "As Time Goes By" (Hermann Hupfeld) - 5:17
9. "A Girl in Calico" (Arthur Schwartz) - 3:35
10. "(In My) Solitude" (Eddie DeLange, Duke Ellington, Gordon Mills) - 3:39
11. "Oh, Lady Be Good!" (George Gershwin, Ira Gershwin) - 3:40
12. "Nuages" (Django Reinhardt) - 3:58

== Personnel ==
Performance

- Helen Merrill - vocals
- Gordon Beck - piano, electric piano
- Steve Lacy - soprano saxophone (tracks 1–6)
- Stéphane Grappelli - violin (tracks 7–12)

Production

- Bernard Amiard - art direction, cover art concept, cover design, design
- Christian Orsini - cutting engineer, engineer
- Jean-Marie Guérin - engineer
- Laurent Peyron - engineer, mixing
- Leonard Feather - liner notes
- Jean-Jacques Pussiau - photography, producer
- Francois LeMaire - producer
- Pascal Bodin - release preparation
