= I'll Be Around (1942 song) =

1942 song

"I'll Be Around" is a popular song written by Alec Wilder and published in 1942. It was first recorded by Cab Calloway and his Orchestra in 1942 and the first hit version was by The Mills Brothers in 1943 when it reached No. 17 in the Billboard pop charts. The song has become a well-known standard, recorded by many artists.

== Background ==
Wilder said, in an interview with music critic Jay Nordlinger, that the song came to him in a taxi cab in Baltimore. Just the title. "I spotted [the title] as I was crumpling up the envelope some days later. Since I was near a piano, I wrote a tune, using the title as the first phrase of the melody. I remember it only took about 20 minutes. The lyric took much longer to write."

== Recorded versions ==
- Mildred Bailey (1942)
- Tony Bennett
- Cab Calloway and his orchestra (1942)
- Rosemary Clooney (1951)
- Bobby Darin (1960)
- Doris Day (1950)
- Cleo Laine and Dudley Moore (1982)
- Peggy Lee (1962)
- Marian McPartland (1955) - Live at Maybeck Recital Hall (1991), Marian Mcpartland Plays the Music of Alec Wilder (1992)
- Helen Merrill - Merrill at Midnight (1957)
- Johnnie Ray
- Don Shirley
- Dinah Shore
- Frank Sinatra - (1943) for Columbia Records, In the Wee Small Hours (1955)
- Chet Baker
