= By Myself (1937 song) =

"By Myself" is a song by composer Arthur Schwartz and lyricist Howard Dietz. The song's lyrics communicate both the sadness of being alone and a satisfaction found in self-reliance and achievement. The song employs an unusual musical form for a popular song: following the incomplete repetition form AABC. It also vacillates between the keys of g minor and F major making for a more harmonically complex tune.

Considered a jazz standard, "By Myself" was originally created for the 1937 Broadway musical Between the Devil. Jack Buchanan introduced the ballad in this musical and it remained a relatively unknown song until it was performed by Fred Astaire in the 1953 musical comedy film The Band Wagon. Astaire's performance catapulted the song from obscurity to popularity; debuting at No. 3 on the Billboard chart on August 29, 1953. It was later sung by Judy Garland in the 1963 film I Could Go On Singing, and by Vivian Reed in the 1972 Broadway revue That's Entertainment.

== Notable recordings ==
- Mabel Mercer – Songs by Mabel Mercer, Vol. 2 (1953)
- Barbara Carroll Trio – Lullabies in Rhythm (1954)
- Lee Wiley and Ellis Larkins – Duologue: Lee Wiley Sings Rogers & Hart; Ellis Larkins Plays Piano Solos (1954)
- Art Farmer – Farmer's Market (1956)
- Patty McGovern – Wednesday's Child (1956), arranged by Thomas Talbert
- Helen Merrill – Dream of You (1956), arranged by Gil Evans
- Sammy Davis Jr. – Sammy Swings (1957)
- Judy Garland – Alone (1957), arranged by Gordon Jenkins; I Could Go On Singing (Original Motion Picture Soundtrack) (1963)
- Gogi Grant – Granted It's Gogi (1957), arranged by Johnny Mandel
- Jerry Lewis – Jerry Lewis Just Sings (1957), arranged by Buddy Bregman
- Johnny Mathis – Warm (1957), arranged by Percy Faith
- Ruth Price – The Party's Over (1957)
- Freddie Redd – San Francisco Suite (1957)
- Mal Waldron – Mal/3: Sounds (1958)
- Tony Bennett – Hometown, My Town (1959), arranged by Ralph Burns; Steppin' Out (1993)
- Carmen McRae – Book of Ballads (1959), arranged by Frank Hunter
- Teresa Brewer – Ridin' High (1960), arranged by Jerry Fielding
- Shirley Scott – Hip Soul (1961)
- Fred Astaire – Three Evenings with Fred Astaire (1962), arranged by David Rose
- Shelley Manne and Jack Marshall – Sounds Unheard Of (1962)
- Lena Horne – Lena Like Latin (1963), arranged by Shorty Rogers
- Doc Severinsen – Torch Songs for Trumpet (1963)
- Jack Jones – Where Love Has Gone (1964)
- Julie London – In Person at the Americana (1964), arranged by Don Bagley
- Esther Ofarim - Is it really me? (1965), arranged and produced by Bobby Scott
- Don Shirley – Water Boy (1965)
- Ann-Margret - Songs from The Swinger (And Other Swingin' Songs) (1966)
- Cher – Bittersweet White Light (1973)
- Dave McKenna – By Myself (1976), "Dancing in the Dark" and Other Music of Arthur Schwartz (1986), and Fresh Air in Concert (1990)
- Shirley Horn – A Lazy Afternoon (1978)
- Roger Kellaway – Say That Again (1978)
- James Williams – Flying Colors (1978)
- Cal Collins – By Myself (1980)
- Johnny Hartman – Once in Every Life (1981)
- Maxine Sullivan – Maxine Sullivan With the Ike Isaacs Quintet (1981); On Tour With the Allegheny Jazz Quartet: Starring Maxine Sullivan (1984); Uptown (1985, with the Scott Hamilton Quintet)
- Buddy De Franco and Oscar Peterson – Hark: Buddy De Franco Meets the Oscar Peterson Quartet (1985), with Joe Pass and Niels-Henning Ørsted Pedersen
- Ella Fitzgerald and Joe Pass – Easy Living (1986)
- Barney Kessel – Red, Hot and Blues (1988)
- Junior Cook – On a Misty Night (1990)
- Trudy Desmond – Tailor Made (1992), arranged by Roger Kellaway
- Stephanie Nakasian – Bitter Sweet (1992)
- Lou Levy – By Myself (1995)

== See also ==
- List of jazz standards
