= Sauter-Finegan Orchestra =

American jazz band

The Sauter-Finegan Orchestra was an American swing jazz band popular in the 1950s.

The orchestra was led by Eddie Sauter and Bill Finegan, who were both experienced big band arrangers. Sauter played mellophone, trumpet, and drums, and had attended Columbia University and Juilliard; Finegan had studied at the Paris Conservatory. They began recording together in 1952, using inventive arrangements that made use of a variety of unusual instruments, including many orchestral instruments as well as oddities like the kazoo and the beaten human chest. In 1957 the 20 members of the band played 90 instruments, including flute, piccolo, oboe, English horn, bass clarinet, and harp.

A June 7, 1952, article in the trade publication Billboard described the new group as "a creative band, which will combine dance music as well as mood interpretations."

The group initially had a three-year contract with RCA Victor, with plans "for about 16 sides a year." Their first chart appearance was with "Doodletown Fifers", their version of a Civil War tune called "Kingdom Coming and the Year of Jubilo". "Nina Never Knew" (featuring vocalist Joe Mooney) and "The Moon is Blue" (with Sally Sweetland) soon followed on the charts. With the success of the singles, they put together a 21-member touring ensemble and began playing venues in 1953. Sweetland was the group's female vocalist, and Andy Roberts was the male vocalist. Because the group played in dance halls rather than concert venues, they encountered little success on the road, and quit touring in 1955 after having accrued much debt.

In the summer of 1954, the group played weekly on the Saturday Night Review television series. Bob Foster wrote in the San Mateo Times that the program would improve if it made better use of the orchestra.

As Sauter explained, "Being popular and famous didn't always mean that you could meet your weekly payroll for such a large band....large gaps in our schedule, due to cancelled dates and other problems, kept putting us into a deeper and deeper financial hole"—and it took seven years to fully discharge the unit's debts.

In March 1957, the pair disbanded the group, and Sauter moved to Germany; Finegan continued as an arranger. They reunited in the studio in 1959 to release a new album, Return of the Doodletown Fifers, and to do jingles for advertisers. After Sauter's death in 1981, Finegan revived the name Sauter-Finegan Orchestra for concerts in New York City in the 1980s.

"World Without Time," from "Adventures in Time" was chosen by host Richard Heffner as the theme music for The Open Mind.

== Discography ==
- New Directions in Music (RCA Victor, 1953)
- The Sound of the Sauter-Finegan Orchestra (RCA Victor, 1953)
- Inside Sauter-Finegan (RCA Victor, 1953)
- Concert Jazz (RCA Victor, 1955)
- Concerto for Jazz Band and Symphony Orchestra (RCA Victor, 1954) (with Fritz Reiner and the Chicago Symphony Orchestra)
- The Sons of Sauter-Finegan (RCA Victor, 1954)
- Adventure in Time (RCA Victor, 1956)
- Under Analysis (RCA Victor, 1956)
- Straight Down the Middle (RCA Victor, 1957)
- NBC Bandstand Live! Feb. 1957 (Collectors Choice Music, 1992)
- Memories of Goodman and Miller (RCA Victor, 1958)
- Return of the Doodletown Fifers (United Artists, 1960)
- Pop Concert (United Artists, 1960, or later)
