= Merrill at Midnight =

Studio album by Helen Merrill
- Released: 1957
- Recorded: February 21 & 27, 1957; New York City
- Genre: Jazz
- Length: 28:29
- Label: EmArcy; MG 36107
- Producer: Bob Shad

Helen Merrill chronology
Dream of You (1956–57)	Merrill at Midnight (1957)	The Nearness of You (1957)

Merrill at Midnight is the fourth album by Helen Merrill, featuring the singer fronting a quartet augmented by an orchestra arranged and conducted by Hal Mooney, recorded in 1957 and released on the EmArcy label.

== Reception ==
Professional ratings
Review scores
Source	Rating
AllMusic	4/5 stars
Tom Hull – on the Web	B

The AllMusic review by Bruce Eder stated "this one's a keeper and in a class by itself, with lots and lots of class."

== Track listing ==
1. "Soft as Spring" (Alec Wilder) – 3:06
2. "Black Is the Color of My True Love's Hair" (Traditional) – 2:27
3. "Lazy Afternoon" (John La Touche, Jerome Moross) – 3:00
4. "The Things We Did Last Summer" (Sammy Cahn, Jule Styne) – 3:02
5. "After You" (Cole Porter) – 3:01
6. "If You Go" (Geoffrey Parsons) – 3:08
7. "If I Forget You" (Irving Caesar) – 3:16
8. "If Love Were All" (Noël Coward) – 3:02
9. "Easy Come Easy Go" (Johnny Green, Edward Heyman) – 3:41
10. "I'll Be Around" (Wilder) – 2:42
- Recorded in New York on February 21, 1957 (tracks 1, 3, 5, 7 & 10) and February 27, 1957 (tracks 2, 4, 6, 8 & 9)

== Personnel ==
- Helen Merrill – vocals
- Marian McPartland (tracks 2, 4, 6, 8 & 9), Buddy Weed (tracks 1, 3, 5, 7 & 10) – piano
- Bill Mure – guitar
- Milt Hinton – double bass
- Sol Gubin – drums
- Unidentified orchestra arranged and conducted by Hal Mooney
