= Stan Getz Plays Music from the Soundtrack of Mickey One =

Soundtrack album by Stan Getz
- Released: 1965
- Recorded: April–June 1965
- Venue: Fine Recording, New York City, NY
- Genre: Jazz
- Label: MGM - SE 4312
- Producer: Stan Getz, Eddie Sauter

Stan Getz chronology
The Canadian Concert of Stan Getz (1965)	Stan Getz Plays Music from the Soundtrack of Mickey One (1965)	Stan Getz & Arthur Fiedler at Tanglewood (1965)

Stan Getz Plays Music from the Soundtrack of Mickey One is a 1965 studio album by Stan Getz arranged by Eddie Sauter of their music for the soundtrack of the 1965 film Mickey One. The two men had previously collaborated on Getz's album Focus (1961).

== Reception ==
Professional ratings
Review scores
Source	Rating
Allmusic	4/5 stars
The Penguin Guide to Jazz Recordings	3.5/4 stars

Billboard chose the album as their 'Soundtrack Spotlight' in their November 6, 1965 issue and wrote that "Getz's alto sax [sic] conjures up the feeling of a big city and the loneliness, excitement, despair, and frustrations of those who live in it. The tension mounts in the score as in the film".

Stephen Cook reviewed the album for Allmusic and wrote that Getz was "well-prepared for the demanding task of soloing atop expansive movie soundtrack charts...Amidst Sauter's kaleidoscopic and mercurial backdrop, Getz offers up a fine mix of fluid improvisation and solo commentary. Never overpowered by the, at times, monumental full-band outbursts, Getz is able to remain poised and even break through the walls of sound with vigorous yet cogent statements of his own".

The Penguin Guide to Jazz Recordings describes the album as “a formidable piece of work.”

== Track listing ==
All compositions by Eddie Sauter.

1. "Once Upon a Time" – 3:58
2. "Mickey's Theme" – 2:22
3. "On Stage (I'm a Polack Noel Coward)"/"Mickey's Flight"/"The Crushout (Total Death)" – 3:00
4. "Is There Any Word From the Lord?"/"Up From Limbo"/"If You Ever Need Me"/"A Taste of Living"/"Shaley's Neighborhood Sewer & The Pickle Club Rock"/"The Agent"/"The Stripper" – 10:48
5. "The Sucubba" – 3:28
6. "Mickey Polka" – 0:54
7. "Where I Live"/"The Apartment"/"Cleaning Up For Jenny"/"The Polish Landlady" – 2:28
8. "I Put My Life In Your Hands"/"A Girl Named Jenny" – 3:40
9. "YES – The Creature Machine"/"Guilty of Not Being Innocent"/"Touching In Love"/"A Five Day Life"/"The Syndicate"/"Ruby Lapp Is Dead"/"(Going To) Who Owns Me"/"The Big Fight"/"Darkness Before the Day" – 11:34
10. "Morning Ecstasy (Under the Scaffold)" – 0:50
11. "As Long As I Live" – 2:06
12. "Is There Any Word? So This Is the Word" – 1:53

== Personnel ==
- Stan Getz - tenor saxophone, producer
- Eddie Sauter - arranger, conductor, producer
- Richard Davis - double bass
- Wally Kane - bassoon, clarinet, bass saxophone
- Charles McCracken, George Ricci, Bruce Rogers, Harvey Shapiro - cello
- Harvey Estrin - clarinet, flute, alto flute, piccolo, alto saxophone
- Al Block - clarinet, flute, piccolo, tenor saxophone
- Ray Shiner - clarinet, cor anglais, oboe, tenor saxophone
- Mel Lewis - drums
- Fred Christie - engineer
- Clark Terry - flugelhorn, trumpet
- Bob Abernathy, Ray Alonge, Richard Berg, James Buffington, Earl Chapin - French horn
- Barry Galbraith - guitar
- Gloria Agostini, Laura Newell - harp
- Elden C. Bailey, Herbert Herbie Harris, Phil Kraus, Walter Rosenberg, Joe Venuto - percussion
- Roger Kellaway - piano
- Tommy Mitchell - bass trombone
- Eddie Bert, Johnny Messner, Eph Resnick, Sonny Russo - trombone
- Al DeRisi, Joe Ferrante, Bobby Nichols - trumpet
- Harvey E. Phillips - tuba
- Julien Barber, Alfred Brown, Leon Ferngut, Dave Mankovitz, Julius Shaier, Janet Simons - viola
- Herbert Baumel, Norman Carr, Bernard Eichen, Louis Gabowitz, Leo Kruczek, Charles Libove, Alan Martin, David Nadien, George Ockner, John Pintavalle, Matthew Raimondi, Ed Simons, Ben Steinberg - violin
- Donald Ashworth, Charles Russo - woodwind
