= Eddie Sauter =

American composer and arranger (1914–1981)

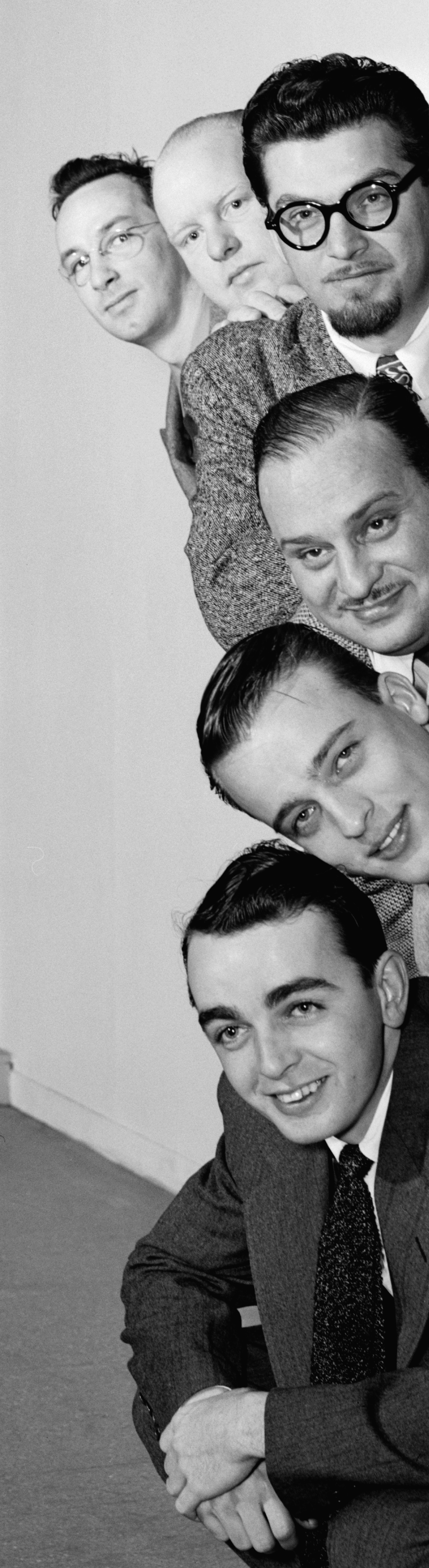
- From top: Eddie Sauter, Edwin Finckel, George Handy, Johnny Richards, Neal Hefti, and Ralph Burns at the Museum of Modern Art, New York c. 1947

Background information
- Born: Edward Ernest Sauter; December 2, 1914; Brooklyn, New York, U.S.
- Died: April 21, 1981 (aged 66) New York City, U.S.
- Genres: Jazz, swing
- Occupations: Arranger, composer
- Years active: 1935–1960s

Edward Ernest Sauter (December 2, 1914 – April 21, 1981) was an American composer and arranger during the swing era.

== Biography ==
Sauter studied music at Columbia University and the Juilliard School. He began as a drummer and then played trumpet professionally, including with Red Norvo's orchestra. Eventually he became a full-time arranger for Norvo. He arranged and composed for Artie Shaw, Tommy Dorsey, Woody Herman, and especially Benny Goodman, earning a reputation for intricate work such as "Benny Rides Again", "Moonlight on the Ganges", and "Clarinet a la King". A bout of tuberculosis contracted in 1942, however, forced a stay at the Summit Park Sanatorium in Pomona, New York, and stalled his musical career for some time.

From 1952 to 1958, Sauter was co-leader of the Sauter-Finegan Orchestra. Between 1957 and 1959, he was Kurt Edelhagen's successor as leader of the SWF orchestra in Baden-Baden, Germany. In 1961, he worked with tenor saxophonist Stan Getz on the album Focus, a collaboration for which Sauter at Getz's commission wrote a suite of string compositions without primary melodies. This allowed Getz to improvise them in his customary style. Roy Haynes, the jazz drummer, appeared on "I'm Late, I'm Late", the only selection to use a non-string instrument other than Getz.

Sauter and Getz collaborated again during Sauter's work composing the score for the film Mickey One (1965), which starred Warren Beatty. Sauter's television composing includes the third season theme to Rod Serling's Night Gallery. In 2003, Sauter was inducted into the Big Band and Jazz Hall of Fame.

Although Sauter is best known for jazz, he also orchestrated Broadway musicals such as 1776, The Apple Tree, and It's a Bird...It's a Plane...It's Superman. Orchestrator Jonathan Tunick said of Sauter's Broadway work: "Eddie did these marvelous things, always theatrical, always effective. And completely unlike anybody else." His composition "World Without Time" is used as the theme music for the public affairs show The Open Mind, originally hosted by Richard Heffner.

== Death ==
Sauter died of a heart attack in Nyack, New York, on April 21, 1981.

== Selected discography ==
=== As arranger and composer ===
- Sauter-Finegan Orchestra, Inside the Sound (1952)
- New Directions in Music (RCA Victor, 1953)
- The Sound of the Sauter-Finegan Orchestra (RCA Victor, 1953)
- Inside Sauter-Finegan (RCA Victor, 1953)
- Ray McKinley, Borderline (1955)
- Concert Jazz (RCA Victor, 1955)
- Concerto for Jazz Band and Symphony Orchestra (RCA Victor, 1954) (with Fritz Reiner and the Chicago Symphony Orchestra)
- The Sons of Sauter-Finegan (RCA Victor, 1954)
- Adventure in Time (RCA Victor, 1956)
- Under Analysis (RCA Victor, 1956)
- Straight Down the Middle (RCA Victor, 1957)
- Mildred Bailey, Me and the Blues (1957)
- NBC Bandstand Live! Feb. 1957 (Collectors Choice Music, 1992)
- Memories of Goodman and Miller (RCA Victor, 1958)
- Return of the Doodletown Fifers (United Artists, 1960)
- Pop Concert (United Artists, 1960, or later)
- Stan Getz, Focus (Verve, 1961)
- Stan Getz, Stan Getz Plays Music from the Soundtrack of Mickey One (Verve, 1965)
- Benny Goodman, Benny Goodman Plays Eddie Sauter (Hep, 1997)
- Red Norvo, Knockin' on Wood (ASV Living Era, 1999)
- John Carisi, Eddie Sauter, Christian Wolff, Stefan Wolpe, Counterpoise (hatART, 2000)
