= Helen Merrill (album) =

Studio album by Helen Merrill
- Released: 1955
- Recorded: December 22–24, 1954
- Studio: Fine Sound Studios, 711 Fifth Avenue, NYC
- Genre: Jazz
- Length: 32:33
- Label: EmArcy

Helen Merrill chronology
Helen Merrill (1955)	Helen Merrill with Strings (1955)

Helen Merrill is the debut studio album by vocalist Helen Merrill, on which she is accompanied by trumpeter Clifford Brown in arrangements by Quincy Jones. Brown had recorded a similar album with Sarah Vaughan only a few days previously, on December 16 and 18, 1954.

In 1995, Merrill recorded a tribute album to Brown, who had been killed in a car accident in 1956, the year after their collaborative album was released.

== Reception ==
Professional ratings
Review scores
Source	Rating
AllMusic	4.5/5 stars
The Rolling Stone Jazz Record Guide	4/5 stars
Tom Hull – on the Web	A−

The AllMusic review by Scott Yanow stated: "The music is essentially straight-ahead bop, yet the seven standards ... are uplifted by the presence of Merrill (in top form) and Brown." In a review of a 2007 reissue of Merrill's first two albums by Lone Hill Jazz, David Rickert singled out the performance of "'S Wonderful" as "one of the best versions of the Gershwin tune I've heard in years" and called the two sessions "a vocal jazz feast well worth deserving of more renown."

== Track listing ==
1. "Don't Explain" (Arthur Herzog Jr., Billie Holiday) – 5:08
2. "You'd Be So Nice to Come Home To" (Cole Porter) – 4:17
3. "What's New?" (Bob Haggart, Johnny Burke) – 4:56
4. "Falling in Love with Love" (Richard Rodgers, Lorenz Hart) – 3:52
5. "Yesterdays" (Otto Harbach, Jerome Kern) – 5:56
6. "(I Was) Born to Be Blue" (Mel Tormé, Bob Wells) – 5:12
7. "'S Wonderful" (George Gershwin, Ira Gershwin) – 3:12

== Personnel ==
- Helen Merrill – vocals
- Clifford Brown – trumpet
- Danny Bank – bass clarinet, flute, baritone saxophone
- Jimmy Jones – piano
- Barry Galbraith – guitar
- Milt Hinton – double bass (tracks 1, 2, 6, and 7)
- Osie Johnson – drums (tracks 1, 2, 6, and 7)
- Oscar Pettiford – cello, double bass (tracks 3, 4, and 5)
- Bobby Donaldson – drums (tracks 3, 4, and 5)
- Quincy Jones – arranger, conductor
