= Hometown, My Town =

Studio album by Tony Bennett
- Released: July 1959
- Recorded: November 3–4 and 6, 1958
- Studio: CBS 30th Street (New York City)
- Genre: Vocal jazz
- Length: 27:13
- Labels: Columbia; CL 1301; CS 8107
- Producer: Mitch Miller

Tony Bennett chronology
Strike Up the Band (1959)	Hometown, My Town (1959)	To My Wonderful One (1960)

Hometown, My Town is an album by American singer Tony Bennett. It was originally recorded in 1958 and released in 1959 on Columbia as CL 1301.

On November 8, 2011, Sony Music Distribution included the CD in a box set entitled The Complete Collection.

== Reception ==
Professional ratings
Review scores
Source	Rating
AllMusic	4/5 stars
The Encyclopedia of Popular Music	3/5 stars
Billboard	4/5 stars

Nick Dedina of AllMusic described the album as "One of the best albums that Tony Bennett cut in the '50s" and noted "jazz arranger Ralph Burns is the perfect choice to flesh out and connect the numbers. He also gamely pens extended musical passages that evoke Manhattan even when the lyrics do not."

Billboard described the album as "a top level performance by Bennett" by giving it four stars to indicate "strong sales potential", and noted that "he solidly sings out a group of ballads".

== Track listing ==
1. "The Skyscraper Blues" (Jenkins, Adair) – 7:08
2. "Penthouse Serenade (When We're Alone)" (Will Jason, Val Burton) – 6:17
3. "By Myself" (Arthur Schwartz, Howard Dietz) – 2:54
4. "I Cover the Waterfront" (Green, Heyman) – 4:58
5. "Love Is Here to Stay" (George Gershwin, Ira Gershwin) – 2:21
6. "The Party's Over" (Jule Styne, Betty Comden, Adolph Green) – 3:35

Recorded on November 3 (#1, 3), November 4 (#4–6) and November 6 (#2), 1958.

== Personnel ==
- Tony Bennett – vocals
- Ralph Burns – arranger & conductor
- Ralph Sharon – piano
- Ed Caine, Walt Levinsky (#1, 3), J. Palmer, Romeo Penque, A. Epstein (#2) – reeds
- Al Cohn – tenor saxophone (#4–6)
- Danny Bank – baritone saxophone
- Al De Risi, Bernie Glow (#1–3), James Maxwell (#2, 4–6), Marky Markowitz, Carl Poole (#4–6) – trumpet
- Billy Byers, Urbie Green (#1–3), William Elton (#2, 4–6), Chauncey Welsch (#1, 3–6) – trombone
- Toots Mondello – alto saxophone, clarinet (#2, 4–6)
- Al Caiola (#1, 3), Barry Galbraith (#2, 4–6)- guitar
- Janet Putman – harp
- Pat Merola (#1, 3), Milt Hinton (#2, 4–6) – bass guitar
- Eddie Costa – percussion (#2, 4–6)
- Terry Snyder – drums (#1, 3)
- Don Lamond – drums (#2, 4–6), percussion (#1, 3)
- Robert Abernathy (#2, 4–6), Ranier C. De Intinis (#4–6), Joseph Singer (#4–6), Ray Alonge (#2), Richard L. Berg (#2) – unspecified instruments

=== Strings ===
- Seymour Barab, Burt Fisch, Harold Colletta (#2, 4–6), Lucien Schmidt (#4–6), Howard Kay, Harvey Shapiro, Alan Shulman, Isadore Zirr – violoncello, viola
- Arnold Eidus, Julius Held, Max Hollander, Harry Lookofsky (#4–6), Harry Edison (#4–6, Leo Kruczek, Tosha Samoroff, H. Urbont, Maurice Wilk, Paul Winter, David Nadien (#2), Fred Buldrini (#2) – violin
