= The Nearness of You (Helen Merrill album) =

Studio album by Helen Merrill
- Released: 1958
- Recorded: December 18 and 19, 1957 and February 21, 1958
- Studio: Universal Recording Studios, Chicago and unnamed studio, New York City
- Genre: Jazz
- Length: 37:30
- Label: EmArcy

Helen Merrill chronology
Merrill at Midnight (1957)	The Nearness of You (1958)	You've Got a Date with the Blues (1958)

The Nearness of You is the fifth studio album by Helen Merrill. It includes performances of standards from two sessions with completely different lineups of accompanying musicians. The later session from February 21, 1958, features very notable jazz performers such as pianist Bill Evans and bassist Oscar Pettiford.

== Track listing ==
1. "Bye Bye Blackbird" (Mort Dixon, Ray Henderson) – 2:57
2. "When the Sun Comes Out" (Harold Arlen, Ted Koehler) – 4:47
3. "I Remember You" (Johnny Mercer, Victor Schertzinger) – 2:11
4. "Softly, as in a Morning Sunrise" (Oscar Hammerstein II, Sigmund Romberg) – 3:19
5. "Dearly Beloved" (Jerome Kern, Mercer) – 2:07
6. "Summertime" (George Gershwin, Ira Gershwin, DuBose Heyward) – 3:28
7. "All of You" (Cole Porter) – 3:33
8. "I See Your Face Before Me" (Howard Dietz, Arthur Schwartz) – 2:39
9. "Let Me Love You" (Harlan Howard) – 2:48
10. "The Nearness of You" (Hoagy Carmichael, Ned Washington) – 4:06
11. "This Time the Dream's on Me" (Arlen, Mercer) – 2:21
12. "Just Imagine" (Lew Brown, Buddy DeSylva, Henderson) – 3:21

== Reception ==
Professional ratings
Review scores
Source	Rating
Allmusic	4/5 stars
The Rolling Stone Jazz Record Guide	3/5 stars

John Bush of AllMusic said that "[a]lternately breathy and atmospheric or bright and dynamic, Helen Merrill often reaches a bit too far on The Nearness of You, though her distinct style and strong personality may be refreshing to vocal fans tired of the standard versions of standards. ... Her powerful voice occasionally gets her into trouble, breaking from breathy to brash and often occupying a rather awkward middle ground." The Bill Evans biographer Peter Pettinger wrote of the session featuring the pianist, "Merrill, enticingly warm, molded the intensity of her tone like a horn, coloring her line with a tastefully controlled vibrato." He also quotes Merrill herself as saying, "Bill was a wonderful accompanist. But is that any wonder since he was so very sensitive and endlessly musical?"

== Personnel ==
Tracks
01, 03, 04, 05, 06, 08, 11:

- Helen Merrill – vocals
- Mike Simpson – flute
- Dick Marx – piano
- Fred Rundquist – guitar
- Johnny Frigo – double bass
- Jerry Slosberg – drums
- David Carroll – arranger, conductor

Tracks
02, 07, 09, 10, 12:

- Helen Merrill – vocals
- Bobby Jaspar – flute
- Bill Evans – piano
- Barry Galbraith – guitar
- Oscar Pettiford – double bass
- Jo Jones – drums
- George Russell – arranger, conductor
