= You've Got a Date with the Blues =

Studio album by Helen Merrill
- Released: 1959
- Recorded: 1958
- Studio: New York City
- Genre: Jazz
- Length: 36:46
- Label: MetroJazz; E 1010
- Producer: Leonard Feather

Helen Merrill chronology
The Nearness of You (1958)	You've Got a Date with the Blues (1959)	American Country Songs (1959)

You've Got a Date with the Blues is an album by vocalist Helen Merrill, recorded for the MetroJazz label in 1958.

== Reception ==
Professional ratings
Review scores
Source	Rating
AllMusic	4.5/5 stars
Tom Hull – on the Web	B+

The AllMusic review by Scott Yanow states: "Helen Merrill dates are always something special. This set for Metrojazz, which has been reissued as a Verve CD, matches the cool-toned yet inwardly heated singer with an all-star sextet." Recommended."

== Track listing ==
1. "The Blues from Black, Brown, and Beige" (Duke Ellington) – 5:22
2. "Am I Blue?" (Harry Akst, Grant Clarke) – 3:32
3. "Blue Gardenia" (Bob Russell and Lester Lee) – 3:18
4. "You've Got a Date with the Blues" (Leonard Feather) – 3:28
5. "The Thrill Is Gone" (Lew Brown, Ray Henderson) – 3:35
6. "(Ah, the Apple Trees) When the World Was Young" ( Philippe-Gérard, Johnny Mercer) – 3:08
7. "Blues in My Heart" (Benny Carter) – 3:37
8. "Vous M'Eblouissez (You Go to My Head)" (J. Fred Coots, Louis Hennevé, Louis Palex) – 3:23
9. "Lorsque Tu M'Embrasses (Just Squeeze Me)" (Ellington, Jacques Plante) – 2:46
10. "The Meaning of the Blues" (Bobby Troup, Leah Worth) – 3:05
11. "Signing Off" (Feather) – 1:32

== Personnel ==
- Helen Merrill – vocals
- Kenny Dorham – trumpet (tracks 1, 3 & 4)
- Jerome Richardson (tracks 1, 3 & 4), Frank Wess (tracks 5, 7 & 9) − tenor saxophone, flute
- Jimmy Jones – piano, arranger
- Barry Galbraith – guitar
- Al Hall (tracks 2, 8, 10 & 11), Milt Hinton (tracks: 1, 3, 4–7 & 9) – bass
- Johnny Cresci – drums
