= Focus (Stan Getz album) =

1962 studio album by Stan Getz

Studio album by Stan Getz
- Released: Late January 1962
- Recorded: July 14, 1961 (string orchestra parts for #s 1–4); July 28, 1961 (Getz's parts for #s 1-4 and the complete parts for #s 5–7); Webster Hall, New York City; additional touch-up recordings made in September and October, 1961, in NYC
- Genre: Cool jazz, third stream
- Length: 38:13 original LP; 43:41 CD reissue
- Label: Verve; V6-8412
- Producer: Creed Taylor

Stan Getz chronology
| Jazz Jamboree '60 (1960) | Focus (1962) | Jazz Samba (1962) |

Professional ratings
Review scores
| Source | Rating |
|---|---|
| AllMusic | 4/5 stars |
| DownBeat | 5/5 stars |
| The Penguin Guide to Jazz Recordings | 4/4 stars |
| The Rolling Stone Jazz Record Guide | 5/5 stars |

Focus is a jazz album recorded in 1961, featuring Stan Getz on tenor saxophone with a string orchestra, piano, bass, and drums. The album is a seven-part suite, which was originally commissioned by Getz from composer and arranger Eddie Sauter. Widely regarded as a high point in both men's careers, Focus was later described by Getz as his favorite among his own records. The pair would next collaborate on their soundtrack to the 1965 film Mickey One.

== Background ==
In 1960, Getz was living in Denmark and struggling with substance abuse, but he felt sufficiently challenged by new innovations in American jazz at this time—notably, Miles Davis's modal album Kind of Blue and the recent groundbreaking work of John Coltrane and Ornette Coleman—that he returned to the U.S. in January 1961. Getz had won the Down Beat poll for ten consecutive years and the Metronome poll for eleven, but in 1960 he was dethroned in both by Coltrane.

In New York and elsewhere, Getz began playing a double bill opposite Coltrane and said, "I'd come in early and listen to John during his set, and he'd be playing so beautifully in his style that he inspired me to push myself that much harder." Coltrane reciprocated the admiration, saying, "We would all play like Stan Getz, if we could." At the time, executives at Verve were pushing Getz to record highly commercial music to reconnect with his American audience, but Getz wanted to create a more personal and artistic statement in response to the new jazz currents that were challenging his imagination. His concept was to create an album with composer and arranger Eddie Sauter, whom he had known since his early days with Benny Goodman back in 1945 and who had been reduced to supporting himself by writing music for jingles and TV programs. Getz wanted to give Sauter's career a boost and told him, "I don't want any arrangements on standards, pop songs, jazz classics, or anything. I want it to be all your own original music—something that you really believe in."

Sauter said of the project, "I wanted to write pieces that had continuity of thought and shape and had enough thematic strength to hold together, almost in their own right. And I always left, at the back of my mind, a space for another part to be added. ... That was the hole I left for Stan."

== Recording ==
Recording sessions were scheduled for July 14 and 28. However, because Getz's mother, Goldie, died of a stroke on the 13th, he missed the first one, which had to go ahead anyway because of the commitment of the many musicians involved. So the first four pieces were originally recorded without Getz. That meant that during the July 28 session, Getz not only had to record the three remaining pieces live with the string orchestra but also had to overdub his improvised lines to the already recorded parts while wearing earphones, which was difficult because they prevented him from hearing his own playing. Getz biographer Dave Gelly likens this task to "making up a concerto on the spur of the moment". Because Getz had perfect pitch and a photographic memory, he was able to succeed after simply studying the lead-sheets and entering what he called an "alpha state" of mind of relaxed creativity. Getz emulated Davis, Coltrane, and Coleman in that he improvised freely on Sauter's themes rather than his chord sequences. Sauter was extremely pleased with the results, saying, "The way [Getz] reacted to the environment of the orchestra was one of the most gratifying things I've ever experienced."

Getz recorded two quite different complete takes of the first track, "I'm Late, I'm Late", the theme of which is nearly identical to the opening minutes of the second movement of Béla Bartók's Music for Strings, Percussion and Celesta. Bartók had been an early supporter of Sauter, who intended the track as an homage. "I'm Late, I'm Late" also features drummer Roy Haynes, the album's only soloist beside Getz. On listening to the completed takes of the piece, Getz, Sauter, and producer Creed Taylor had difficulty choosing which one to use and ultimately decided to splice them together, making the piece the longest on the album. The second piece, "Her", was dedicated to Goldie Getz. Although Getz had virtually only previously played in 4/4 time, he easily adapted to unfamiliar time signatures, such as 6/8 in "Once Upon a Time", and throughout the session displayed both remarkable rhythmic freedom and "superhuman control of tone".

== Reception ==
The Penguin Guide to Jazz selected this album as part of its suggested "Core Collection", stating: "Nobody ever arranged for Getz as well as this, and Sauter's luminous and shimmering scores continue to bewitch." Similarly, AllMusic critic Stephen Cook describes Focus as "admittedly Getz's most challenging date and arguably his finest moment".

Getz biographer Donald L. Maggin wrote that Getz and Sauter "had created the most fully realized third stream record ever made". Biographer Dave Gelly adds that the album "received hugely favorable notices in the music press" and that "[i]f anything qualifies Stan Getz for the title of genius, it's what he achieved on July 28th 1961".

== Track listing ==
All compositions by Eddie Sauter.

1. "I'm Late, I'm Late" – 8:10
2. "Her" – 6:13
3. "Pan" – 3:58
4. "I Remember When" – 5:03
5. "Night Rider" – 3:58
6. "Once Upon a Time" – 4:48
7. "A Summer Afternoon" – 6:03
8. "I'm Late, I'm Late" [45 rpm issue] – 2:31 Bonus track on CD reissue
9. "I Remember When" [45 rpm issue] – 2:57 Bonus track on CD reissue

== Personnel ==
- Stan Getz – tenor saxophone
- Steve Kuhn – piano
- John Neves – bass
- Roy Haynes – drums
- Alan Martin, Norman Carr, Gerald Tarack, and seven others – violin
- Jacob Glick and three others – viola
- Bruce Rogers and one other – cello
- Unnamed harp player
- Eddie Sauter – arranger
- Hershy Kay – conductor

Technical

- Pete Turner – photography

== Charts ==
| Chart (2025) | Peak position |
|---|---|
| Greek Albums (IFPI) | 84 |
