= Avant Slant =

Avant Slant (One Plus 1 = II?)

Studio album by The John Benson Brooks Trio
- Released: September 1968
- Recorded: 1962–1968
- Genre: Sound collage; experimental; jazz; pop; musique concrète; postmodern
- Length: 45:37
- Label: Decca
- Producer: Milt Gabler

John Benson Brooks chronology
Alabama Concerto (1958)	Avant Slant (One Plus 1 = II?) (1968)

Avant Slant (subtitled One Plus 1 = II?) is an album by American jazz ensemble the John Benson Brooks Trio, released in September 1968 by Decca Records. Produced by Decca A&R executive Milt Gabler, it was pianist and bandleader John Benson Brooks' third and final released recording, arriving ten years after his previous record, the acclaimed Alabama Concerto (1958).

The record is a sound collage that draws from several primary sources, namely The Twelves–a 1962 live performance by Brooks' ensemble in which they improvised within the twelve-tone technique–and D.J.-ology, a musique concrète tape that Brooks privately created which consisted of numerous sound effects, one-liners and excerpts of records and radio broadcasts. Gabler contributed additional pop songs to the final album, which he largely created himself. The record uses the Brooks trio's dissonant live music as a backbone while cutting to sampled audio and recordings of poetry, comedy, spoken comments, speeches and found sounds. Themes of war, racism, identity and personal freedom underpin the record.

On release, Avant Slant was a critical and commercial disappointment. Although reviews ranged from positive to negative, many expressed puzzlement at the record. Some critics and listeners who enjoyed Brooks' prior work in experimental jazz found that The Twelves material was devalued by the presence of the pop culture-centric D.J.-ology snippets. Despite this, the album has gone on to be credited as a prophetic release in the fields of sampling and mashups.

== Background and recording ==
Prior to Avant Slant, John Benson Brooks had spent many years working as a pianist and arranger. His only two previous albums were Folk Jazz USA (1956), part of a personal project to adapt folk music idioms into modern jazz, and Alabama Concerto (1958), the hybrid of jazz, folk and contemporary composition that became his most critically acclaimed work. After 1958, the musician's music became more experimental and he largely disappeared from the public eye for many years. In 1962, Brooks' jazz trio (pianist Brooks, alto saxophonist Don Heckman and percussionist Howard Hart) were commissioned to write a piece to perform at the International Jazz Festival at Howard University. The resulting performance, named The Twelves, was the culmination of Brooks' experiments in improvising jazz in the twelve-tone serial and chance idioms. Heavily influenced by Ornette Coleman, it was ultimately the trio's only public show. (Note: Heckman described Brooks' method as one of "improvising using 12-tone rows and rhythms structured around non-metric time units," and commented that Avant Slant "preserved" the use of his system.)

The genesis of Avant Slant came when Brooks created a tape entitled D.J.-ology, described by John Clellon Holmes as "a curious melange of air-shots, record excerpts, sound effects and one-liners that Brooks had put together, more or less experimentally". The tape also included other sounds which Brooks had recorded off disc jockey radio programs. Intended as a Christmas present for Heckman and composer George Russell, D.J.-ology exemplified Brooks' longtime interest in "the possibilities of using the tape recorder as a musical instrument." He had already created works of musique concrète, including a late 1940s piece created with a wire recorder to "capture moments that seemed like 'emblems' of favorite jazz recordings and stringing them together with environmental sounds", according to author Phil Ford. Brooks later studied with John Cage and composed Bird Meets Cage, which combined his passions for musique concrète and chance procedures by mixing clips of his and Heckman's atonal jazz with excerpts from electronic music albums.

In 1966, Brooks conceived the idea of creating "meta-music", or music as "a play of competing -isms," which, according to Ford, led the composer "to the idea of embodying those -isms in audio clips and making an album out of them". This resulted in Avant Slant, based in Brooks' improvised twelve-tone jazz system and the "pop-art musique concrète" of his "DJology". He had partly financial motivations, as he hoped to earn enough money to account for his mother's medical bills and to "contribute something to his household economy." The record was a collaboration between Brooks and producer Milt Gabler, who worked as an A&R executive at Decca Records. Brooks gave Gabler tapes of both The Twelves and D.J.-ology. Gabler then created much of the album; he added some of his own recordings and, according to Ralph J. Gleason, "let them sit for months while he played with them" before finally arriving at the finished album. Ford credits Gabler for finding the majority of the records's samples, sequencing most of its parts, writing lyrics for five of its six original songs and conceiving the "quick lines and snatches of dialogue read by actors" that also appear. An early problem was managing the costs of licensing all the intended audio excerpts, which was sometimes averted by Gabler re-recording clips he was unwilling to pay for. (Note: In his discussion of Avant Slant and its use of sampling, David Toop writes that Gabler's "foresight into the future of the record of the record business also contributed to the intellectual and economic origins of sound sampling", citing how, in the 1930s, he was the first to license and reissue previously released recordings on his own labels. Toop adds, "To recycle music as a commodity in this way was a conceptual breakthrough that affected the creative and historical implications of mechanical reproduction as well as its economic structure."))

== Composition ==
Avant Slant is a sound collage, described by Gabler as a "twelve tone collage", which uses excerpts of The Twelves and D.J.-ology tapes and Gabler's additions to create what Gleason calls "a kind of kaleidoscope sound montage of contemporary America knotted together by the improvisations of the jazz trio of Brooks and the songs of Gabler." Author David Toop describes it as a "disrupted, haphazard narrative" in which the "intense angularity" of the trio's live playing is "intercut with recordings of comedy routines, poetry, piano solos and songs performed by singers such as Judy Scott, Lightnin' Hopkins, The Tarriers and Corrine." Burgess calls it an experimental work and "collage of sound" that uses the trio's dissonant music, non-musical sounds and "fragments of poetry, bits of pop tunes, broadcasts, spoken comments and instrumental snatches". Ford describes it as "an assaultive mix of atonal jazz, Tin Pan Alley songs, poems, found sounds, and non sequitur lines read by ham actors". The record has also been categorized as jazz and a mixed-media collage. (Note: The liner notes describe Avant Slant as "a collage-in-sound, in which fragments of poetry, pop tunes, radio broadcasts, and Feiffer-like babble intermingle to form an aural history of 'Right Now.' It is also a twelve-tone: jazz concert, an electronic poem composed in several media, and the first example of what may be a radically new art form.") The 1962 Brooks ensemble performance forms the spine of the album.

The different source materials are often presented in a linear and consecutive manner without any layering. In Toop's description, the album's subject matter covers an array of late 1960s concerns, including "spaceflight, sexual liberation, the Vietnam war, racism and civil rights, identity and personal freedom". He adds that these themes are accentuated by poems and speeches that "range from Herman Goering's 'guns and butter' speech justifying Nazi Germany's rearmament policy in 1936 to a brief excerpt from Black Dada Nihilismus, Amiri Baraka's violent verbal assault on white imperialist civilisation". Gleason highlights the use of poetry from Lawrence Ferlinghetti and John Donne and snippets of voice which "sound like (and perhaps are) Lord Buckley, Everett Dirksen, Dean Martin, LBJ, George Wallace and others." Furthermore, Gabler wrote several show tune-style ballads for the record, sung by Scott with Brooks' music, lifted some ragtime music from an early Decca release and added portions of "We Shall Overcome" and Malvina Reynolds' "Little Boxes" (1962) and works from critic Seymour Krim and LeRoi Jones.

In Ford's description, Brooks used Avant Slant to envision, represent and adapt to "the pop postmodernity that buried his native culture of Cold War modernism", and believed it to be "more way-out" than contemporary listeners could realize. David Atkinson compared the album to early 1960s jazz poetry, except that all the components on Avant Slant are "shortened down to mere fragments of an entire section." Toop writes that although the record is musically and politically serious, it is "still descended from radio drama and the novelty break-in records". In Marianna Ritchey's estimation, the record's combination of music and recorded soundscapes was merely one assortment of ideas from Brooks' archival work and, as Ford argues, thus could only be understood by Brooks.

== Release and reception ==
Avant Slant was released by Decca in September 1968 with a psychedelic album cover and liner notes by John Clellon Holmes. Brooks' final released recording, it sold very poorly and received few reviews; according to Ford, "what notices it did get were either respectful or dismissive but in any event puzzled. Avant Slant was the overcooked product of ten years’ private study and musical experimentation, and there was no public context for it." Critics and listeners who endorsed Brooks' experimental jazz work believed that the pop cultural nature of the album's D.J.-ology elements devalued The Twelves, including Gil Evans, who dismissed them as "entertainment". Brooks predicted these reactions, as – according to Ford – the record was a product of the moment where "jazz intellectuals could feel themselves being shoved aside by a new pop culture that did not share their modernist values."

Martin Wiliams of Saturday Review praised the Brooks ensemble's original performance, noting the humor, swing and conviction in their playing, but dismissed Avant Slant for intercutting portions of the concert with "stilted, unfunny verbal gaggery, sound effects, snippets of other music, quasi-poetry, 'mod' verbiage, and a few conventionally conceived pop tunes." He added that despite the liner notes describing the album as a work for "Right Now", what he wanted was "to be able to listen to it tomorrow". A reviewer for Coda similarly dismissed the D.J.-ology segments as "ultra-hip, pretentious, money-grubbing, and several other things the editor would not be allowed to print." In their review, Cash Box commented that Avant Slant provides "a highly unusual listening experience" in which the four twelve-tone jazz improvisations are "broken up to allow space for 'ghost-voices' of contemporary figures, which reflect today's complex confusions."

In The San Francisco Examiner, Gleason believed it to be an innovative and "impressive performance" that pushed the boundaries of the album format further back following the Beatles' Sgt. Pepper's Lonely Hearts Club Band (1967), with regards to using it as a single artistic entity from start to finish rather than a reproduction of a live performance or a straight musical program. He considered there to be "flashes of real genius" on the record and concluded that it could help broaden the appeal of the album medium to young people who had been increasingly using film to express their worldviews. Paul Burgess of The Press of Atlantic City wrote that the album "seeks a rational whole out of irrational components" and compared it to the "surrealistic fur-lined tea cups" of Dadaism. He believed it to be a "turned on affair that will strike you as either a relevant piece of art or as a big put-on, depending on how you view such things." Similarly, David Atkinson of The Kansas City Star described it as a "montage of social comment and musical experimentation, but there are many elements of each which can be enjoyed, depending on the listener's point of view."

== Legacy ==
Professional ratings
Review scores
Source	Rating
AllMusic	3/5 stars

Despite the critical and commercial failure of Avant Slant, it has been credited with anticipating "aspects of collage, mashup, and sampling." Duncan Heining of All About Jazz has listed Avant Slant as an example of jazz that experiments with electronics. In 1999, Heckman wrote in The Los Angeles Times that the album had become "hard-to-find". Retrospectively, AllMusic have named Avant Slant an "Album Pick". The authors of The Essential Jazz Records Volume 2 (2000) highlight Brooks and Heckman's work in improvisation and composition, but believed that Avant Slant presented them "in an extremely unsatisfactory manor", due to how it mixes segments of their music with excerpts of pop, poetry and radio broadcasts "in ways that make it impossible to decide what they had achieved and whether there was a further potential." Academic writer Casey Nelson has called it a "deeply strange jazz/pop/found-sound fusion album".

== Track listing ==
=== Side one ===
1. – 10:41
  1. "The King Must Go" (Segments) (John Benson Brooks)
  2. "The Gods on High" (Brooks, Milt Gabler)
  3. "Pie in the Sky" (Brooks, Gabler, lyrics by John Donne)
  4. "El Bluebirdo" (Brooks)
  5. "A Bird Can Be" (Gabler)
2. – 12:11
  1. "Cherries Are Ripe" (Brooks)
  2. "What's a Square?" (Brooks, Gabler)
  3. "Slapstix" (Jack Shaindlin)
  4. "True Blue Heart" (Shaindlin)
  5. "Little Boxes" (Excerpt) (Malvina Reynolds)
  6. "But, Where Are You?" (Brooks, Gabler)

=== Side two ===
3. – 13:07
  1. "Ornette" (Segments) (uncredited)
  2. "Love Is Psychedelic" (Brooks, Gabler)
  3. "The Life I Used to Live" (Lightnin' Hopkins)
  4. "When I First Came to Town" (uncredited)
  5. "Mend Them Fences" (Brooks, lyrics by Robert Graves)
  6. "But, Where Am I?" (Brooks, Gabler)
4. – 9:38
  1. "Satan Takes" (Segments) (Brooks)
  2. "Pie in the Sky" (Brooks, Gabler, lyrics by Catherine Lee Bates)
  3. "We Shall Overcome" (Thomas Jefferson)

=== Excerpt credits ===
- Sammy Davis Jr. – Sammy Davis Jr. at Town Hall
- Jack Shaindlin – piano solo portions from 50 Years of Movie Music
- The Tarriers – "Little Boxes"
- Seymour Krim – The Magic Underwear Panty (with Detachable Garters)
- Lawrence Ferlinghetti – Autobiography
- Carl Sandburg – The People, Yes
- LeRoi Jones – Black Dada Nihilismus
- Lightnin' Hopkins – "Life I Used to Live"

== Personnel ==
Adapted from the liner notes of Avant Slant.

The John Benson Brooks Trio

- John Benson Brooks – piano
- Don Heckman – alto saxophone
- Howard Hart – snare drum, cymbal

Others

- Milt Gabler – producer, editing supervisor
- Ernie Stone – voice actor
- Herb Hartig – voice actor
- Jack Gibson – voice actor
- Joyce Todd – voice actor
- Judy Scott – voice ("The Gods on High", "What's a Square?", "But, Where Are You?", "But, Where Am I?")
- Lawrence Ferlinghetti – voice ("El Bluebirdo")
- Jack Shaindlin – piano ("Slapstix", "True Blue Heart")
- The Tarriers - performer ("Little Boxes" (Excerpt))
- Frank Hamilton – voice ("We Shall Overcome")
- Guy Carawan – voice ("We Shall Overcome")
- LeRoi Jones – voice ("We Shall Overcome")
- Pete Seeger – voice ("We Shall Overcome")
- Zilphia Horton – voice ("We Shall Overcome")
- Emil Korsen – engineer
- George Chandler – engineer
- Joseph Curran – engineer
- Rudy May – engineer
- Joan Franklin – recording
- Robert Franklin – recording
- Steinweiss – cover
- John Clellon Holmes – liner notes
