= Alabama Concerto =

Studio album by John Benson Brooks featuring Cannonball Adderley and Art Farmer
- Released: 1958
- Recorded: July 28 & 31 and August 25, 1958; Reeves Sound Studio, New York City
- Genre: Jazz
- Length: 42:27
- Label: Riverside; RLP 12-276

John Benson Brooks chronology
Folk Jazz USA (1956)	Alabama Concerto (1958)	Avant Slant (1968)

Cannonball Adderley chronology
Somethin' Else (1958)	Alabama Concerto (1958)	Jump for Joy (1958)

Alabama Concerto is an album by composer John Benson Brooks featuring saxophonist Cannonball Adderley and trumpeter Art Farmer; it was released on the Riverside label in 1958. For Brooks, it was "an outgrowth of an assignment he had [...] to transcribe for a book some folk recordings made in Alabama by Harold Courlander"; these contrasted with New Orleans jazz recordings, causing Brooks to consider an alternative influence on the history of jazz.

== Reception ==
Professional ratings
Review scores
Source	Rating
Allmusic	3/5 stars

Critic John S. Wilson, in a contemporaneous review, observed of the composer: "Working from several rural folk themes, he develops his Concerto through ensembles, written solos and improvised solos played by a quartet". Concluding in a negative vein, Wilson stated that the album "lacks movement and explicit development [...] the work becomes lost in monotony long before the two full LP sides have been completed." The Allmusic site awarded the album 3 stars with the review by Scott Yanow stating, "Although not essential, the music is thought-provoking, quite melodic, and looks backwards toward folk music of the 1800s while giving the pieces a 1950s jazz sensibility".

== Track listing ==
All compositions by John Benson Brooks

1. First Movement: THEMES: "The Henry John Story" / "Green, Green Rocky Road" / "Job's Red Wagon" - 4:49
2. First Movement: "The Henry John Story (return)" / "Green, Green Rocky Road (return)" - 3:17
3. First Movement: "Job's Red Wagon (return)" - 3:07
4. Second Movement: THEMES: "Trampin'" / "The Loop" / "Trampin' (return)" - 7:54
5. Second Movement: "The Loop (return)" - 2:25
6. Third Movement: THEME: "Little John Shoes" - 3:09
7. Third Movement: THEME: "Milord's Calling" / "Little John Shoes (return)" / "Milord's Callin' (return)" - 5:06
8. Fourth Movement: THEMES: "Blues for Christmas" / "Rufus Playboy" / "Grandma's Coffin" / "Blues for Christmas (return)" - 7:33
9. Fourth Movement: "Grandma's Coffin (return)" / "Rufus Playboy (return)" / "Grandma's Coffin (2nd return)" - 5:07

== Personnel ==
- John Benson Brooks - piano, arranger
- Cannonball Adderley - alto saxophone
- Art Farmer - trumpet
- Barry Galbraith - guitar
- Milt Hinton - bass
