= Lynn Taylor =

English and Australian actress

- Born: 16 June 1938 (age 87); United Kingdom
- Occupation: Actress
- Years active: 1963–1993
- Spouse: John Faassen

Lynn Taylor (born 16 June 1938) is an English and Australian actress, singer and dancer.

== Life and career ==
Taylor was born in the UK. She began her stage career with the Manchester Repertory Theatre, and studied at the Royal College of Music for one year.

In England, she worked in TV series such as "The Saint", "The Avengers" and "Danger Man" and was also Elizabeth Taylor’s stand-in in the movie Cleopatra. In October 1964, she moved to Sydney to launch a new TV career. Besides Australian TV series and stage productions, she co-anchored live TV talk shows and featured on TV commercials.

Taylor was an international promotional representative for Elizabeth Arden, Inc. She taught at the National Institute of Dramatic Art.

== Personal life ==
Lynn married Sydney businessman in the mid-1950s. They had three sons. She had a daughter with her second husband, TV and theatre producer, actor and writer John Faassen.

== Performances ==
=== Television ===
Year	Title	Role	Notes
1963	The Avengers	Valerie	Episode: "Box of Tricks"
1964	Danger Man	Stewardess	Episode: "Yesterday's Enemies"
1966	Homicide	Dolores Briggs	Episode: "Wasp Nest"
1968	Hunter	Eva	Episode: "The Visitor"
1970	Division 4	Sally Page	Episode: "Mr. Fifty Percent"

=== Stage ===
Year	Title	Role	Notes
1965	The Worst Woman in London	Frances Vere	The Music Hall, Neutral Bay, Sydney
1971	The Rocks Push		The Old Sydney Tavern, The Rocks, Sydney
1974	Up a Gum Tree	Miss Molly	The Wild Colonial Theatre Restaurant, St Leonard's, Sydney
1987	To Catch a Thief		Footloose Theatre Restaurant, Thornleigh
1988	A Frantic French Affair		Footloose Theatre Restaurant, Thornleigh
1990	We're No Angels	Babe Botticelli	Footloose Theatre Restaurant, Thornleigh
1991	Her Wicked Ways	Lavinia de Ville	Footloose Dinner Theatre, Thornleigh, Sydney
1992	Vampires Don't Cry	Gorgeous Gussie, the Wayward Witch	Footloose Dinner Theatre, Thornleigh, Sydney
1993	The Fright of Her Life	Luscious Lola	Johnny's Stage Door Theatre Restaurant
1993	Always Look On The Bright Side Of Life	Herself	Zenith Theatre, Chatswood, Sydney
