= Saturday Night Revue (TV series) =

American TV variety series (1953–1954)

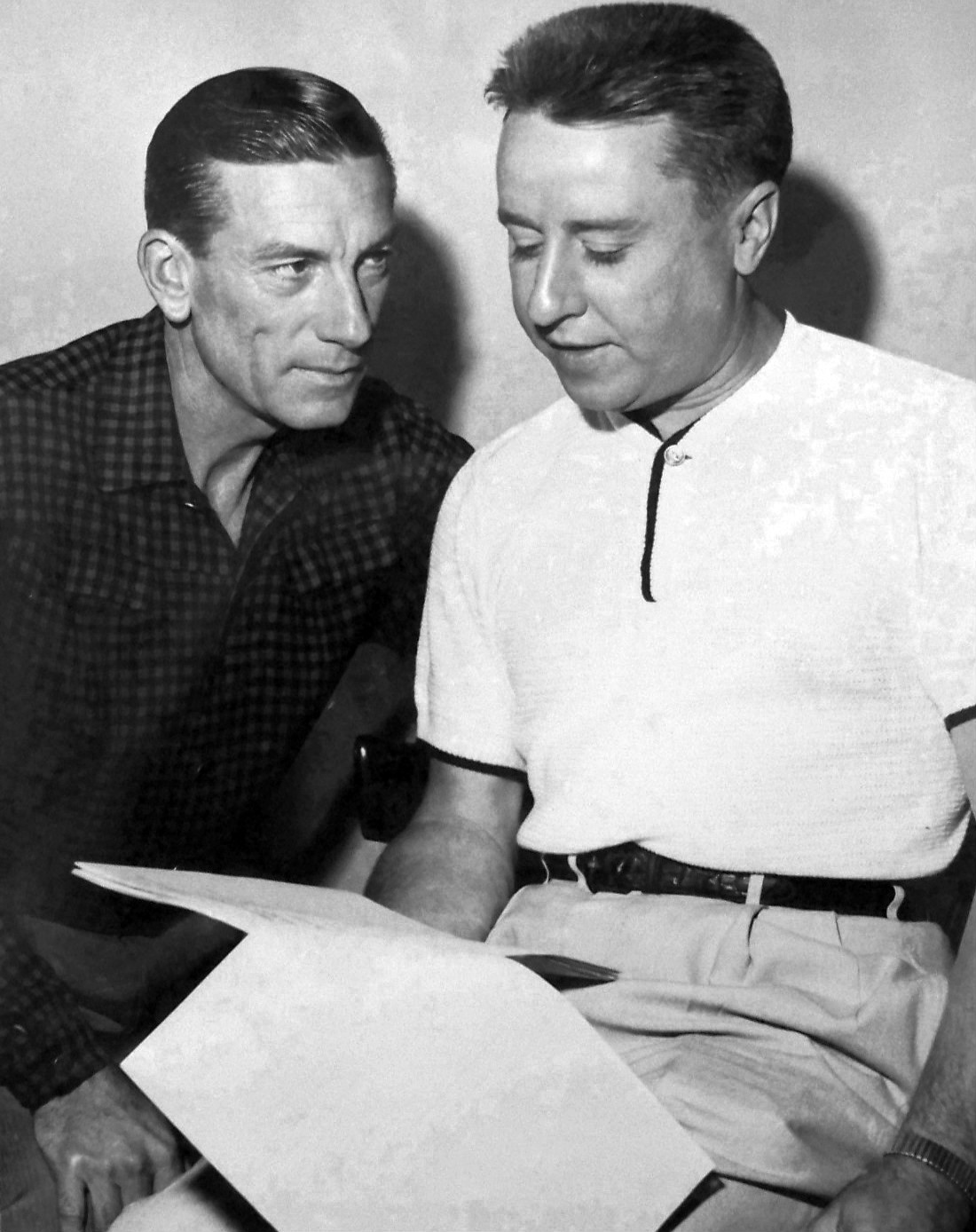
- In July 1954, Hoagy Carmichael (left) and George Gobel substituted for Saturday Night Revue host Eddie Albert while he was filming a motion picture
- Written by: Jack Ellinson; Milton Geiger; Jerry Seelin; Phil Shukin; Snag Werris
- Starring: Hoagy Carmichael; Eddie Albert
- Music by: Gordon Jenkins; Sauter-Finegan Orchestra
- Country of origin: United States

Production
- Producer: Ernie Glucksman

Original release
- Network: NBC
- Release: June 6, 1953 – September 18, 1954

Saturday Night Revue (also seen as Saturday Night Review) is a live American variety television series that was broadcast on NBC in 1953 and 1954 as a summer replacement for Your Show of Shows.

== 1953 version ==
Hoagy Carmichael was the host of Saturday Night Revue, the main premise of which was the introduction of new entertainers. NBC executives viewed the program as a vehicle for testing those performers in hopes of developing new programs that would feature some of them. Those who appeared on it included Eddy Arnold, Dick Wesson, Cass Daley, Sunny Gale, Jackie Kannon and George Gobel. The show featured sets representing Carmichael's penthouse apartment and a nightclub. Episodes opened with him entertaining friends in the apartment, after which they moved to the nightclub to watch performers. Gordon Jenkins led the program's orchestra.

=== Production ===
The producer was Joe Bigelow, the director was Sidney Miller, and the musical director was Jerry Fielding. The writers were Stan Davis, Ken Higgins, Sid Kuller, Miller, Elon Packard, and Phil Shuken. The show was broadcast from 9 to 10:30 p.m. on Saturdays, beginning on June 6, 1953, and ending on September 5, 1953. Sponsors were Bendix, Benrus watches, Griffin polish, and SOS.

=== Critical reception ===
Critic Jack Gould found little to like about the program in his review in The New York Times, describing the show as "an uninspired ninety minutes that was hard to distinguish from an audition." He wrote that the program "needs to be taken in hand vigorously, given a point of view routined with some imagination and revamped to capitalize on Mr. Carmichael's talents".

A review in the trade publication Variety said that the show "sagged under the weight of mediocre scripting, trite sketches, and a truckload of commercials." The review added that better use of Carmichael's talents would improve the series significantly. It complimented Gobel's performance, pointing out his "flawless" timing, "sharp" lines and "deceptive casualness". A concluding comment noted that the show would be better if it expanded use of the apartment setting rather than shifting "haphazardly" between settings.

== 1954 version ==
Eddie Albert was the master of ceremonies when Saturday Night Revue again replaced Your Show of Shows in the summer of 1954, and the format was more of a standard revue. Pat Carroll was a regular. Ben Blue and Alan Young alternated weeks as the show's comedians, and the Sauter-Finegan Orchestra provided music. The program again focused on presenting new performers.

Saturday Night Revue originated in Hollywood with Ernie Glucksman as producer and Jim Jordan as director. The writers were Jack Ellinson, Milton Geiger, Jerry Seelin, Phil Shukin, and Snag Werris. It began on June 12, 1954, and ended on September 18, 1954.

=== Critical reception ===
A review in the trade publication Billboard summed up the show as "better than most" summer programs. Albert and Blue were commended for maintaining a "free and easy atmosphere" over the 90-minutes length, regardless of the quality of the material. Reviewer June Bundy wrote, "the over-all effect was one of beguiling nonchalance".

Bob Foster wrote in the San Mateo Times that the program needed to make better use of Albert and the Sauter-Finegan orchestra while diminishing the use of "cut-rate talent of questionable ability".

== Earlier use of title ==
Saturday Night Revue was used in 1950 as an umbrella title for two programs, The Jack Carter Show (8–9 p.m. ET) and Your Show of Shows (9–10:30 p.m. E.T.).
