= Helen Merrill with Strings =

Studio album by Helen Merrill
- Released: 1955
- Recorded: October 21, 22 & 24, 1955; New York City
- Genre: Jazz
- Length: 41:19
- Label: EmArcy; MG 36057
- Producer: Bob Shad

Helen Merrill chronology
Helen Merrill (1954)	Helen Merrill with Strings (1955)	Dream of You (1956–57)

Helen Merrill with Strings is the second album by Helen Merrill, featuring the singer fronting a quartet augmented by a string section arranged by Richard Hayman, recorded in 1955 and released on the EmArcy label.

== Reception ==
Professional ratings
Review scores
Source	Rating
AllMusic	Positive
Tom Hull – on the Web	B+

The AllMusic review by Richard Mortifoglio called the album "an unmitigated artistic success. The strings are tastefully scored, the songs are classics or soon to be, and Merrill's delivery is by turns emotional, haunting, and highly musical."

== Track listing ==
1. "Lilac Wine" (James Shelton) – 4:26
2. "Anything Goes" (Cole Porter) – 3:07
3. "Mountain High, Valley Low" (Bernie Hanighen, Raymond Scott) – 3:02
4. "Beautiful Love" (Haven Gillespie, Egbert Van Alstyne, Victor Young, Wayne King) – 3:15
5. "Comes Love" (Charles Tobias, Sam H. Stept, Lew Brown) – 3:03
6. "End of a Love Affair" (E. C. Redding) – 3:29
7. "When I Fall in Love" (Edward Heyman, Victor Young) – 3:22
8. "The Masquerade is Over" (Herb Magidson, Allie Wrubel) – 4:03
9. "Just You, Just Me" (Raymond Klages, Jesse Greer) – 3:35
10. "Spring Will Be a Little Late This Year" (Frank Loesser) – 3:51
11. "You Won't Forget Me" (Kermit Goell, Fred Spielman) – 3:10
12. "Wait Till You See Him" (Lorenz Hart, Richard Rodgers) – 3:22
- Recorded in New York on October 21 (tracks 1, 10 & 11), October 22 (tracks 3, 4, 6, 7 & 9) and October 24 (tracks 2, 5, 8 & 12), 1955

== Personnel ==
- Helen Merrill – vocals
- Hank Jones – piano
- Barry Galbraith – guitar
- Milt Hinton – double bass
- Sol Gubin – drums
- Unidentified strings arranged and conducted by Richard Hayman
