= John Benson Brooks =

American jazz musician (1917–1999)

John Benson Brooks (February 23, 1917, in Houlton, Maine – November 13, 1999, in New York City) was an American jazz pianist, songwriter, arranger, and composer.

== Career ==
Brooks worked early in his career as an arranger for Randy Brooks, Les Brown, Boyd Raeburn, and Tommy Dorsey. He worked often with lyricists Eddie DeLange and Bob Russell in the 1940s; he and DeLange wrote the song "Just as Though You Were Here," a hit for Tommy Dorsey with Frank Sinatra as vocalist. He wrote "You Came a Long Way from St. Louis" with Bob Russell for Ray McKinley, released as a single in 1948.

In 1956, Brooks worked with Zoot Sims and Al Cohn on the recording, "Folk Jazz U.S.A.", and was recognized as a composer during this time. His works blend elements of folk music and dodecaphony with the idioms of modern jazz. In 1958, he composed a work entitled Alabama Concerto and assembled a cast of sidemen for a recording which included Cannonball Adderley, Art Farmer, Barry Galbraith, and Milt Hinton. The recording was eventually re-issued under Adderley's name.

Brooks was a close friend of Gil Evans. Evans later recorded his works "Sirhan's Blues" and "Where Flamingos Fly" (the last co-written with Harold Courlander and Elthea Peale). Brooks and Courlander collaborated on a book of transcriptions of rural blues and spirituals in Alabama, which provided some of the inspiration for the Alabama Concerto. A trio Brooks formed In the 1960s performed at the International Jazz Festival in Washington in 1962 with a composition called "The Twelves," based on improvisations on twelve-tone rows. This became part of an LP called Avant Slant which was a collage of new and already recorded sounds and songs from Milt Gabler, the poet Robert Graves, LeRoi Jones, Lightnin' Hopkins, and others.

== Personal life and death ==
Brooks was married at least four times. On February 26, 1939, he wed fellow Houlton native Helen Walton Hughes, an Emerson College senior then heard on a five-day-a-week show on Boston's WCOP, whose first-place finish in talent searches sponsored, respectively, by MGM and Kate Smith, had resulted in her uncredited appearance in the 1938 film, Arsène Lupin Returns (recounted in the serialized, Hughes-authored "Helen Hughes' Hollywood Diary," published in the Boston American), as well as a guest spot on Smith's national radio program. On November 21, 1952, they divorced and the following year Brooks married Elthea Peale, lyricist for "Where Flamingos Fly" and at least three other Brooks compositions. That marriage was dissolved in 1958. On April 8, 1961, he married Frances Jones Boyeson.

On November 13, 1999, Brooks died at his Manhattan home at the age of 82.

== Discography ==
- Folk Jazz USA (1956)
- Alabama Concerto (Riverside Records, 1958) featuring Cannonball Adderley, Art Farmer
- Avant Slant (Decca, 1968)
