= The Open Mind (TV series) =

- The Open Mind logo
- Genre: Interview
- Created by: Richard Heffner
- Presented by: Alexander Heffner
- Country of origin: United States

Production
- Running time: 30 minutes
- Production company: The Open Mind Legacy Project

Original release
- Network: National Educational Television
- Release: May 1956 – present

The Open Mind is a nationally broadcast public affairs interview program. It is the longest running program in the history of American public television and was first broadcast in May 1956. Its creator, Richard Heffner, engaged in a "thoughtful excursion into the world of ideas" across politics, media, technology, the arts and realms of civic life, and was host until his death on December 17, 2013. Alexander Heffner, Richard Heffner's grandson, took over as the program's host in 2014.

== History ==
The Open Mind was conceived to elicit meaningful insights into the challenges that society faces in contemporary areas of public concern. The program's title is attributed to a quote of Barnard College dean Virginia Gildersleeve (1877–1965), "Have an open mind, but not so open that your brains fall out." The theme music chosen by Heffner, "World Without Time," is by the Sauter-Finegan Orchestra from their LP Adventures in Time.

In 2023, the producer of The Open Mind released a special series of conversations with elected officials over meals in their home states, Breaking Bread with Alexander, that premiered on Bloomberg TV and are now available on The Open Mind. Season 2 launched on July 4, 2024 and was released on Bloomberg Originals and The Open Mind.

"Mayors of the World," a 70th anniversary special of The Open Mind exploring the roots of local democracy and policy innovations across three continents, premiered in May 2026.

== Guests ==
Thousands of guests have appeared on the program, including:

- Civil rights and human rights leaders - Martin Luther King Jr., Malcolm X, Elie Wiesel, Gloria Steinem
- Politicians - John Thune, Doug Burgum, Bernie Sanders, Cory Booker, Pete Buttigieg, John Fetterman, Michele Lujan Grisham, Shelley Moore Capito, Eugene McCarthy, Daniel Patrick Moynihan, Donald Rumsfeld, Richard Lugar, Dianne Feinstein, Ernesto Zedillo, Omar Saif Ghobash
- Authors and journalists - William F. Buckley, Salman Rushdie, James Patterson, Judy Blume, Isaac Asimov, Robert Caro, Neil Postman, William Safire, Carrie Sheffield, Frank Bruni, Jean Guerrero, Isobel Yeung
- Economists - Milton Friedman, Alan Greenspan, Paul Krugman, Peter G. Peterson
- Doctors - Jonas Salk, Bill Frist, Thomas Frieden, Laurie Glimcher, Nora Volkow
- Jurists and lawyers - Thurgood Marshall, Stephen Breyer, Robert Bork, Martha Minow, Judith Kaye
- Academics - Kathleen Hall Jamieson, Keith Whittington, Zeynep Tufekci, James Hansen
- Technologists - Mitchell Baker, Biz Stone, Blake Irving, Sue Gardner
- Historians - John Hope Franklin, Michael Ledeen, Richard Brookhiser, Arthur M. Schlesinger Jr.
- Religious figures - Jonathan Sacks, John I. Jenkins, J. Bryan Hehir, Thomas Gumbleton
- University presidents - Michael S. Roth, Vartan Gregorian, Elizabeth Bradley, Mitch Daniels
- Actors and filmmakers - J.B. Smoove, Robert Redford, Joe Weisberg, Norman Lear, Oliver Stone
- Musicians - Macy Gray, Moby, Aloe Blacc, 9th Wonder, Shabaka Hutchings, Ottmar Liebert

== See also ==
- List of longest running United States television series
