= Richard Heffner =

American communications professor, broadcaster

- Born: August 5, 1925
- Died: December 17, 2013 (aged 88); New York City
- Education: Columbia University
- Occupations: Communications professor Broadcaster
- Notable work: The Open Mind

Richard Douglas Heffner (August 5, 1925 – December 17, 2013) was the creator and host of The Open Mind, a public affairs television show first broadcast in 1956. He was a University Professor of Communications and Public Policy at Rutgers University and also taught an honors seminar at New York University.

== Career ==
A protégé of Edward R. Murrow, Heffner helped establish what is now WNET (Channel 13) in New York City and was its first general manager, from 1961–63. From 1974–94 Heffner was chairman of the Classification and Rating Administration (CARA) of the Motion Picture Association of America (MPAA).

Heffner earned his BA (1946) and MA (1947) degrees in history from Columbia University. He taught two courses at Rutgers University. "Mass Communications and the American Image" is taught through the School of Communication, Information and Library Studies, while "Communication and Human Values" is an honors undergraduate seminar taught through the School of Arts and Sciences. He also taught the same honors undergraduate course, "Communication and Human Values", at New York University. For the 50th anniversary of The Open Mind in Jan. 2006, fellow broadcaster Bill Moyers guest-hosted the show and interviewed Heffner.

=== Books ===
- Documentary History of the United States, a verbatim anthology of important public documents in American history
- Conversations With Elie Wiesel (2001) with Elie Wiesel

== Death ==
Heffner died at his home in New York City on December 17, 2013 due to a cerebral hemorrhage at the age of 88.

== See also ==
- MPAA film rating system

== External sources ==
- Rutgers University: Richard D. Heffner
- Richard Heffner, The Gilded Age (1952)
