= Helen Merrill =

American jazz vocalist (born 1929)

- Born: Jelena Ana Milcetic; July 21, 1929 (age 96); New York City, New York, U.S.
- Genres: Jazz
- Occupation: Vocalist
- Years active: 1944–present
- Labels: EmArcy, Verve
- Spouses: Aaron Sachs (m. 1948–1956) Donald J. Brydon (m. 1967–1992) Torrie Zito (m. 1994; died 2009)

Helen Merrill (born Jelena Ana Milcetic; July 21, 1929) is an American jazz vocalist. Her first album, the eponymous 1954 recording Helen Merrill (with Clifford Brown on EmArcy), was an immediate success and associated her with the first generation of bebop jazz musicians. After an active 1950s and 1960s, Merrill spent time recording and touring in Europe and Japan, falling into obscurity in the United States. In the 1980s and 1990s, she was recorded by EmArcy, JVC and Verve, and her performances in America revived her profile.

== Early life and career ==
Jelena Ana Milcetic was born in New York to Croatian immigrant parents Frano and Antonija Marija. Frano was born in Vantačići, and Antonija Marija in Malinska; unusually, both were born Milčetić. She began singing in jazz clubs in the Bronx in 1944 when she was fourteen. She had three sisters and a brother who died before she was born. By the time she was sixteen, Merrill had taken up music full-time. In 1952, Merrill made her recording debut when she was asked to sing "A Cigarette for Company" with Earl Hines; the song was released on the D'Oro label, created specifically to record Hines' band with Merrill. Etta Jones was in Hines' band at the time and she, too, sang on this session, which was reissued on the Xanadu label in 1985.

Merrill was signed by Mercury Records to their EmArcy label. In 1954, Merrill recorded an eponymous LP, which featured trumpeter Clifford Brown and bassist Oscar Pettiford. The album was produced and arranged by Quincy Jones, who was twenty-one years old. The success of Helen Merrill prompted Mercury to sign her to an additional four-album contract.

Merrill's follow-up was the 1956 LP Dream of You, which was arranged and conducted by Gil Evans. His arrangements for Merrill laid the foundation for his work with Miles Davis.

== Abroad ==
After recording sporadically through the late 1950s and 1960s, Merrill spent much of her time touring Europe, where she enjoyed more commercial success than she had in the United States. She settled for a time in Italy, recording an album there and doing concerts with jazz musicians Piero Umiliani, best known to American baby boomers for his song Mah Nà Mah Nà, Chet Baker, Romano Mussolini, and Stan Getz. In 1960, arranger and film composer Ennio Morricone worked with Merrill on an EP, Helen Merrill Sings Italian Songs, on the RCA Italiana label.

Parole e Musica: Words and Music was recorded in Italy with Umiliani's orchestra in the early 1960s while Merrill was living there. Merrill sings in English, but each song is preceded by an Italian translation of its lyrics, spoken by Fernando Caiati.

She returned to the U.S. in the 1960s but moved to Japan in 1966, staying on after touring there and subsequently marrying Donald J. Brydon, Tokyo-based Asia Bureau Chief of United Press International, in April 1967. She developed a following in Japan that remains strong decades later. In addition to recording while in Japan, Merrill became involved in other aspects of the music industry, producing albums for Trio Records and co-hosting a show on FEN (Armed Forces Radio and Television Service) with Bud Widom in Tokyo.

== Later career ==
Merrill returned to the U.S. in 1972. She recorded a bossa nova album, a Christmas album, and a Rodgers and Hammerstein album. In 1987, she and Gil Evans recorded fresh arrangements of Dream of You, which they released under the title Collaboration. It was the best received of Merrill's 1980s albums.

In 1987, she co-produced Billy Eckstine Sings with Benny Carter. In 1995, she recorded Brownie: Homage to Clifford Brown. In 2000, she released Jelena Ana Milcetic a.k.a. Helen Merrill, which drew on her Croatian heritage as well as her American upbringing. The album combines jazz, pop, and blues songs with traditional Croatian songs sung in Croatian. She released the album Lilac Wine in 2003.

In his Biographical Guide to the Great Jazz and Pop Singers, jazz critic Will Friedwald writes that Merrill "improved with age," and that her "albums of the nineties and aughts represent a dramatic improvement over her vintage work."

== Personal life ==
Merrill has been married three times, first to musician Aaron Sachs (1948–1956), then to UPI vice president Donald J. Brydon (1967–1992), and finally to arranger-conductor Torrie Zito, a marriage that lasted until his death in 2009.

She is the mother of one child, Allan Preston Sachs, born in New York in 1951 from her first marriage to Aaron Sachs. He was later known professionally as Alan Merrill, and was a successful singer and songwriter who wrote and recorded the original (1975) version of the rock classic "I Love Rock N Roll" as lead vocalist of the British band Arrows. He died in 2020.

== Discography ==
=== As leader/co-leader ===
- 1954.02 - Helen Merrill (EmArcy, 1955) w Johnny Richards Orchestra
- 1954.12 - Helen Merrill (EmArcy, 1955) w Clifford Brown arr. by Quincy Jones
- 1955.10 - Helen Merrill with Strings (EmArcy, 1955) arr. by Richard Hayman
- 1956-06 - Dream of You (EmArcy, 1957) arr. by Gil Evans
- 1957.02 - Merrill at Midnight with Hal Mooney and his orchestra (EmArcy, 1957)
- 1957–58 - The Nearness of You (EmArcy, 1958) arr. by David Carroll
- 1954-58 The Complete Helen Merrill on Mercury (Mercury, 1985) Reissue of the 6 previous albums in 4cd
- 1958 - You've Got a Date with the Blues (MetroJazz, 1959)
- 1959 - American Country Songs (Atco, 1959) arr. by Chuck Sagle
- 1960 - Helen Merrill Parole e Musica (RCA Italiana, 1960) reissued as
- 1960-62 - Jazz In Italy (Liuto, ) Reissue of Parole e Musica plus other 11 tracks recorded in Italy
- 1963 - In Tokyo (King Records, Japan, 1963)
- 1965 - The Artistry of Helen Merrill (Fontana/Mainstream Recs, 1965)
- 1966 - Sings Folk (London, Japan, 1966)
- 1967 - The Feeling Is Mutual (Milestone, 1967) with Dick Katz
- 1967 - Bossa Nova In Tokyo (Victor, Japan, 1967)
- 1967 - Autumn Love (Victor, Japan, 1967)
- 1968 - Sings Screen Favorites (Victor Japan, 1968)
- 1969 - A Shade of Difference (Milestone, 1969) with Dick Katz
- 1969 - Plaisir d'Amour (Victor, Japan, 1969)
- 1970 - Sings the Beatles (Victor Japan, 2003)
- 1970 - Helen Sings, Teddy Swings! (Victor Japan/Catalyst, 1970) with Teddy Wilson
- 1971 - Sposin'(Victor Japan/Storyville, 1971) with the Gary Peacock Trio
- 1977 - John Lewis/Helen Merrill (Trio Japan/Mercury, 1977) with John Lewis
- 1978 - Something Special (Inner City, 1978)
- 1980 - Chasin' the Bird (Inner City, 1980)
- 1980 - Casa Forte (Trio, 1980)
- 1982 - Rodgers & Hammerstein Album (DRG, 1982)
- 1985 - No Tears, No Goodbyes with Gordon Beck (Owl, 1985)
- 1986 - Music Makers (Owl, 1986)
- 1986 - Jerome Kern Album (Victor, 1986) – a.k.a. Sings Jerome Kern
- 1987 - Collaboration with Gil Evans (EmArcy, 1988)
- 1989 - Duets with Ron Carter (EmArcy, 1989)
- 1989 - Just Friends (EmArcy, 1989)
- 1991 - Christmas Song Book (JVC, 1991) with Art Farmer, and Mel Tormé (1 tr)
- 1991 - Clear Out of This World (Antilles, 1992)
- 1994 - Brownie: Homage to Clifford Brown (Verve, 1994)
- 1997 - You and the Night and the Music (Verve, 1997)
- 1999 - Jelena Ana Milcetic a.k.a. Helen Merrill (Verve/Gitanes, 2000)
- 2003 - Lilac Wine (Sunnyside, 2003)

=== As guest ===
With Billy Eckstine and Benny Carter

- Billy Eckstine Sings with Benny Carter (Verve, 1986)
