= Torrie Zito =

American pianist, music arranger, composer and conductor (1933–2009)

Salvatore "Torrie" Zito (October 12, 1933 – December 3, 2009) was an American pianist, music arranger, composer and conductor.

== Life and career ==
He is widely known for his work with John Lennon on Lennon's second solo album Imagine, as string arranger.

He wrote advertising jingles, including a famous one for Maxwell House, and background music for many television programs.

In 1964, he conducted and did the arrangements for singer Morgana King's classic album, Miss Morgana King. Those with a good ear might like to compare the voicing of the first few bars of Torrie's arrangement of the track "All Blues" with that of the first few bars of Symphony No. 11 by Dmitri Shostakovich. They are remarkably similar; a hint by Torrie that long sections of the symphony are inspiration for variations on All Blues. Helen Merrill confirms that Torrie was interested in the music of Shostakovich.

A New York City resident, Zito was married to singer Helen Merrill, with whom he recorded several albums. He had one daughter, Lisa Zito, from his first marriage, and a stepson, a singer-songwriter Alan Merrill (most known for his 1975 hit "I Love Rock'n'Roll"), by his second marriage (to Merrill). His brother is the drummer Ronnie Zito.

== Death ==
Zito died from emphysema on December 3, 2009 at his Manhattan home.

== See also ==
- List of jazz arrangers
- List of music arrangers
