= David Hoenigman =

American novelist

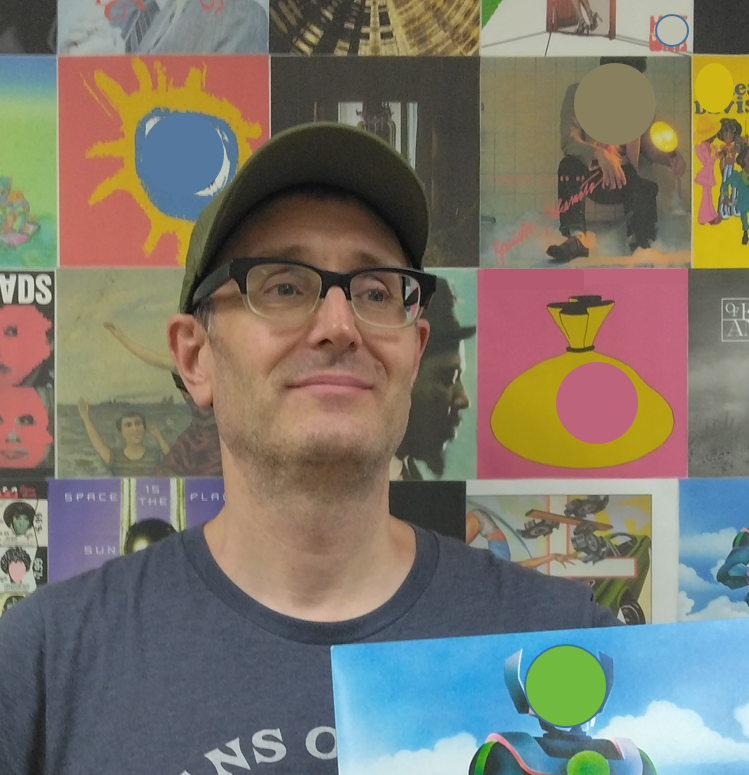
- David Hoenigman, Experimental Novelist
- Born: Cleveland, Ohio, U.S.
- Writing career
- Genres: Experimental fiction, literary fiction, postmodern, absurdist fiction

David Hoenigman (born and raised in Cleveland, Ohio) is an author of experimental literature and avant-garde literature. He has lived in Tokyo, Japan since 1998.

Hoenigman is a visiting assistant professor at Keio University Shonan Fujisawa Campus where he teaches courses on Indie Rock, Heavy Metal, Subcultures, and Creative Writing. He founded the SFC Record Club, a space for vinyl record enthusiasts to gather on the Keio campus, in 2022.

== Burn Your Belongings ==
Hoenigman's novel, Burn Your Belongings, has been described by The Japan Times as "a brave exercise in anti-narrative, a reminder to us that there is more to writing and reading than best-sellers."

Word Riot compared the novel to the work of Samuel Beckett and Pierre Guyotat, summarizing the novel as "a well-crafted and adventurous book from what is undoubtedly a writer of great promise."

The Stranger writes "David Hoenigman's Burn Your Belongings is a dense narrative of choppy sentences that elude the human desire for story at almost every turn. When read aloud, mantralike, the thick walls of text take on the feel of religious chant, a prayer to weariness and sickness and anxiety. At other times, they flutter with moments of happiness and love, and feel exponentially more like real life than anything Hemingway or any naturalist ever put to paper."

== Bibliography ==
Novels

- Burn Your Belongings, Jaded Ibis Press (2010)
- Squeal for Joy, Schism 2 Books (2015)

Novellas

- Man Sees Demon, SFC Indie Press (2020)

Chapbooks

- Shame on You, Louffa Press (2010)

== Film appearances ==
Hoenigman appeared as a giant in the film Attack on Titan (2015).

== Interviews ==
Hoenigman regularly interviewed avant-garde writers for the online journal Word Riot. Some of the writers he has interviewed for Word Riot include Mark Amerika, John Bennett, Norbert Blei, Tom Bradley, James Chapman, Billy Childish, Noah Cicero, Dennis Cooper, Debra Di Blasi, Shozin Fukui, Eckhard Gerdes, Richard Gilbert, Richard Kostelanetz, Stacey Levine, Jeffrey Lewis, Carole Maso, Scott McClanahan, Dawn Raffel, Davis Schneiderman, Jess C Scott, Ron Silliman, Judith Skillman, Terese Svoboda, and D. Harlan Wilson.

Hoenigman's Sion Sono article was the cover story of the June 19, 2009 edition of Metropolis Magazine.

In November 2009, Hoenigman's interview with Yoko Ono appeared in The Japan Times.

Hoenigman also interviewed Japanese film director and screenwriter, Kōji Shiraishi for 3:AM Magazine.

In 2020, Hoenigman started the Blown Speakers Vlog: "A Program for Mass Liberation in the Form of an Album Discussion Vlog."
