= Word Riot =

American online magazine

Word Riot / Word Riot Press
- Website type: Consumer
- Available in: English
- Website: http://www.wordriot.org
- Launched: 2002
- Current status: Not Active (7/9/18)

Word Riot was an American online magazine that published poetry, flash fiction, short stories, novel excerpts, creative nonfiction, reviews, and interviews.

== History and profile ==
The magazine was launched in March 2002 by author and publisher Jackie Corley with the help of the late Paula Anderson. It was initially the literary section of a now defunct online music magazine, Communication Breakdown. Word Riot is headquartered in Middletown, New Jersey. It is published monthly.

In 2003, a publishing unit called Word Riot Press was developed as a spinoff of the online magazine. Word Riot Press publishes anthologies, short story collections, poetry, and novels. Authors published by the press include Paula Bomer, Mike Young, David Barringer, Timmy Waldron, Nick Antosca, Scott Bateman and Pulitzer Prize winner Gregory Pardlo.

Word Riot was known for publishing the "forceful voices of up-and-coming writers and poets." Since 2002 the magazine published interviews, fiction, and poetry by such writers as Tao Lin, Tony O'Neill, Tom Bradley, Steve Almond, Richard Peabody, Chris Campanioni, Andrew Coburn, James Chapman, Nick Antosca, Ethel Rohan, Jackson Bliss, Roxane Gay, Peter Grandbois, Sean Gill, Noah Cicero, Caleb J. Ross, Jess C Scott, David Hoenigman, Scarlett Watters, and Doug Draime. Work featured in the journal has been collected in The Best Small Fictions.

In October 2016 the magazine ceased publication.

== See also ==
- List of literary magazines
