= Marilyn Mazur =

American-born Danish percussionist (1955–2025)

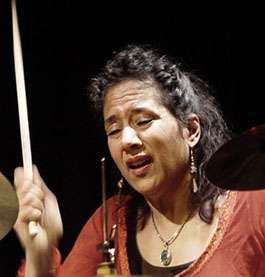

Background information
- Born: January 18, 1955; New York City, U.S.
- Died: December 12, 2025 (aged 70) Copenhagen, Denmark
- Genres: Jazz, avant-garde jazz
- Occupation: Musician
- Instrument: Drums
- Labels: Storyville, ECM, Dacapo, Stunt
- Website: www.marilynmazur.com

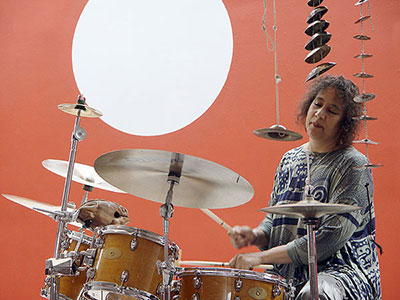

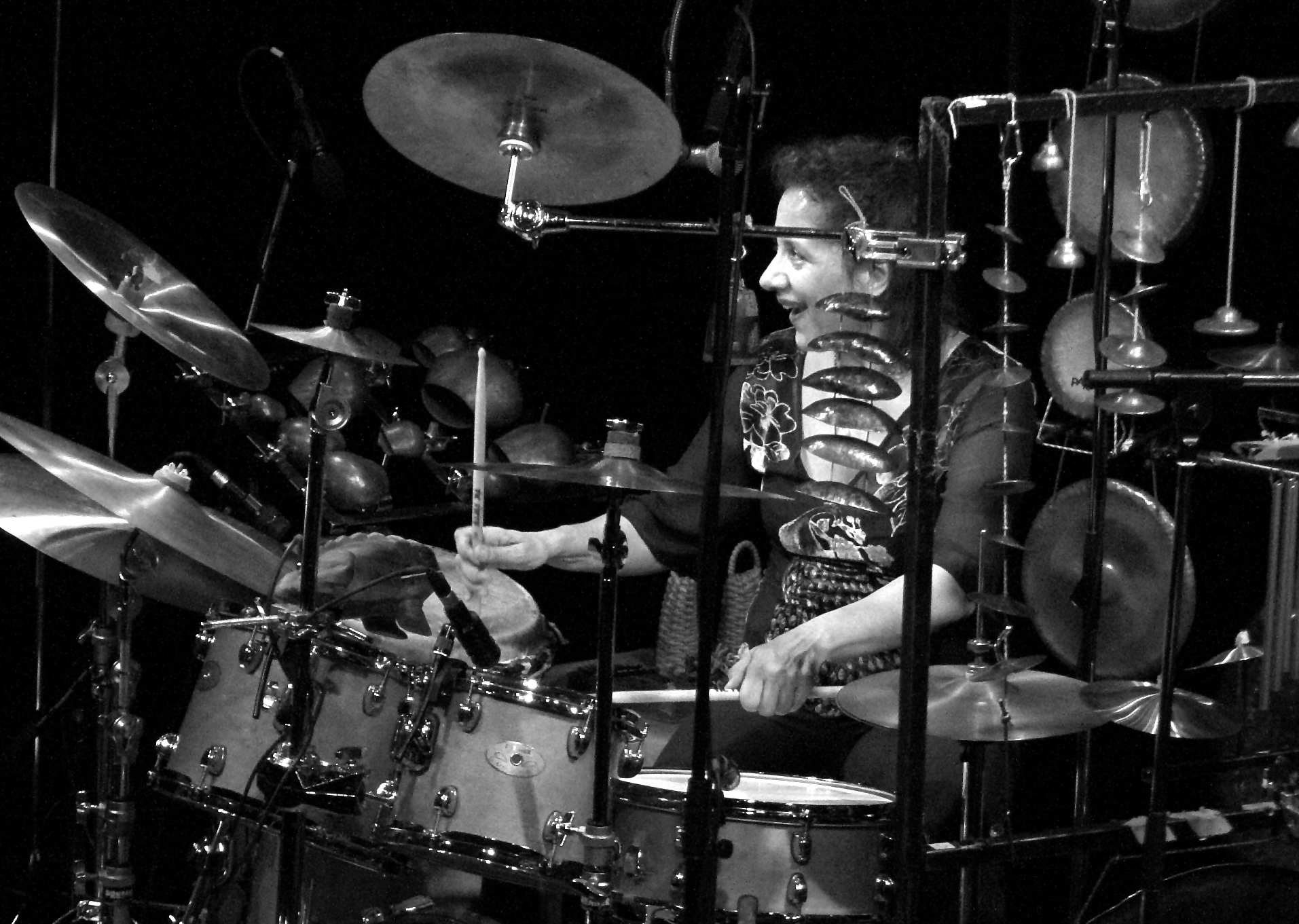

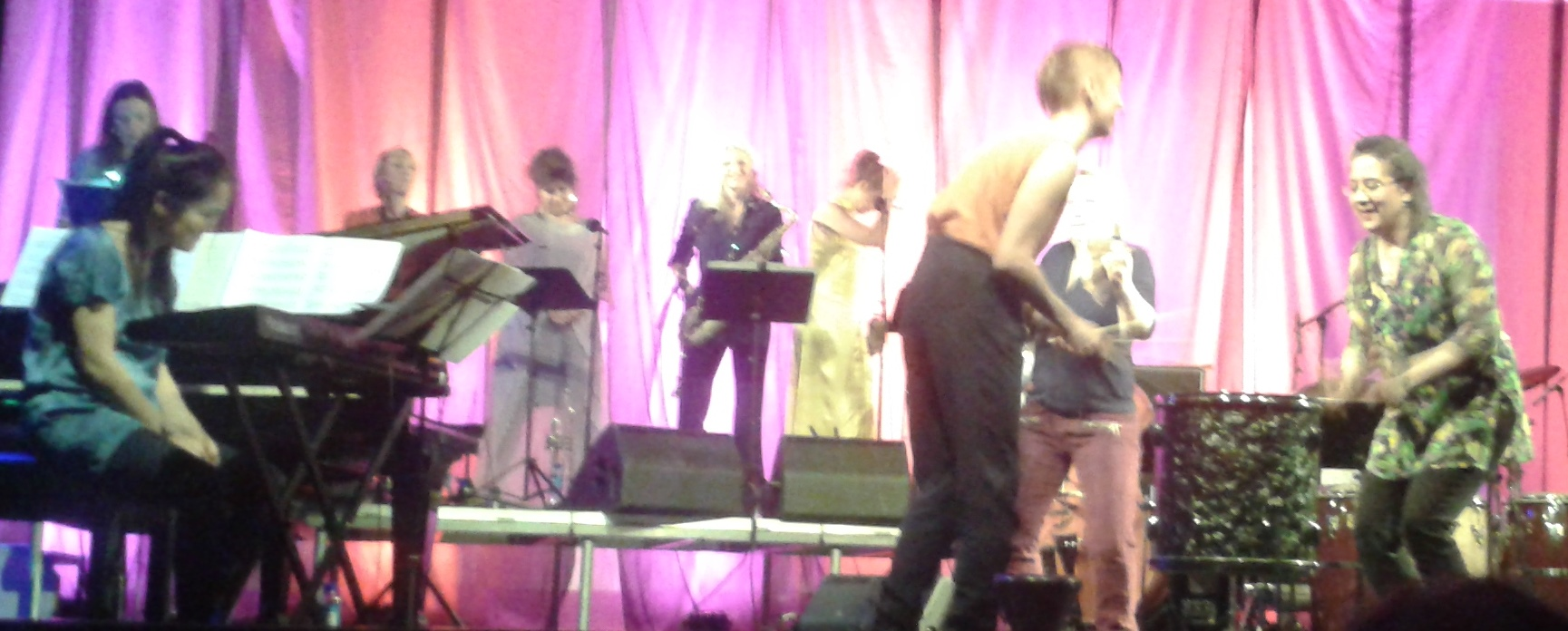
Marilyn Mazur's Shamania at Vossajazz 2016

Marilyn Mazur (January 18, 1955 – December 12, 2025) was an American-born Danish percussionist. From 1975, she worked as a percussionist with various groups, among them Six Winds with Alex Riel. Mazur was primarily an autodidact, but she had a degree in percussion from the Royal Danish Academy of Music.

== Life and career ==
Mazur was born in New York City on January 18, 1955, to a Polish father and an African-American mother. The family moved to Denmark when Marilyn was six years old. She learned to play the piano, but when she was 19, she took up drumming, inspired by Al Foster, Airto Moreira, and Alex Riel. She started her first band in 1973, Zirenes. In 1978, she formed Primi, an all-woman theatre band. In 1985, she was asked to participate in the Palle Mikkelborg project that would become the Miles Davis album Aura, and soon after she went on the road with Miles Davis. Afterward, she played with Gil Evans, Wayne Shorter, Jan Garbarek, and Makiko Hirabayashi. Her all-Scandinavian band Shamania consists of avant-garde female musicians.

== Death ==
Marilyn Mazur died on December 12, 2025, at age 70.

== Gallery ==
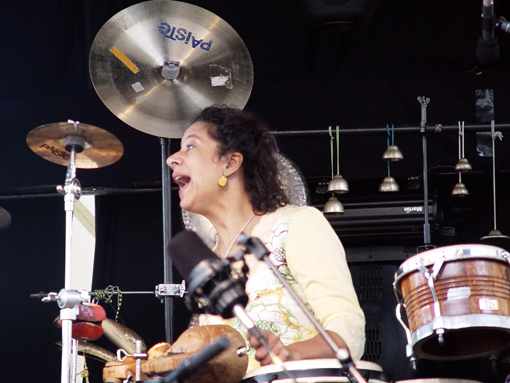

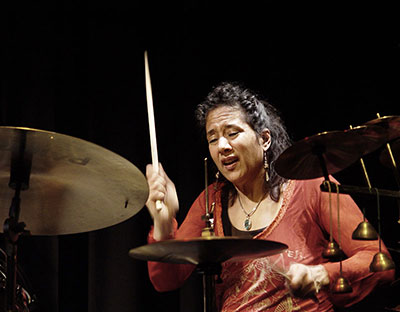

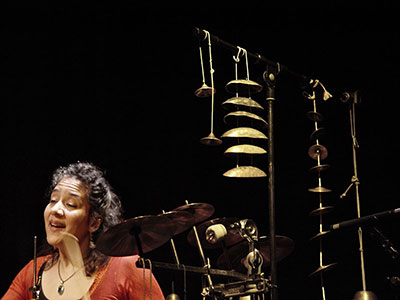

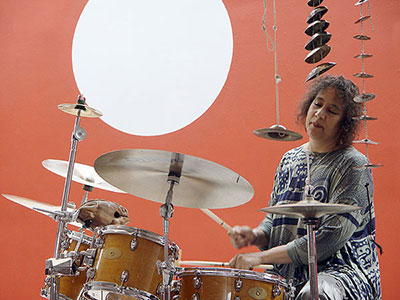

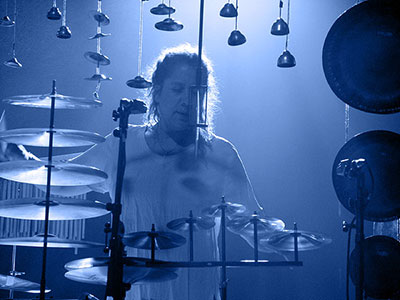

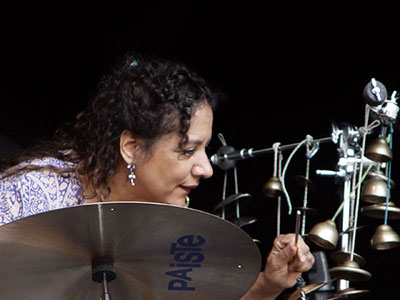

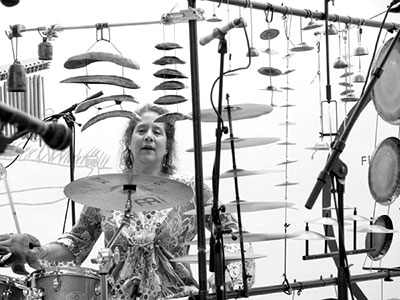

== Honors ==
- Ben Webster Prize, Ben Webster Foundation, 1983
- JASA Prize, Danish jazz journalists, 1989
- Jazzpar Prize, 2001
- Edition Wilhelm Hansens Composer Prize, 2004
- Danish Django dOr (Legend), 2006
- Unlimited Communication, Telenor 2007
- EuroCore-JTI Jazz Award, 2010
- The Grethe Kolbe Grant, Danish Conductors Association, 2013
- No. 1 Jazz Performer, Down Beat, six times

== Discography ==
=== As leader ===
- MM 4 with Mazur Markussen Kvartet (Rosen, 1984)
- Marilyn Mazur's Future Song (veraBra, 1992)
- Circular Chant (Storyville, 1995)
- Small Labyrinths (ECM, 1997)
- Colors with LLL-Mental (Hot Wire, 1997)
- Jordsange/Earth Songs (Dacapo, 2000)
- Poetic Justice with Lotte Anker, Marilyn Crispell (Dacapo, 2001)
- All the Birds: Reflecting + Adventurous (Stunt, 2002)
- Daylight Stories (Stunt, 2004)
- Elixir with Jan Garbarek (ECM, 2008)
- Tangled Temptations & the Magic Box (Stunt, 2010)
- Celestial Circle (ECM, 2011)
- Flamingo Sky (Stunt, 2014)
- Marilyn Mazur's Shamania (RareNoise, 2019)

=== As guest ===
With Lindsay Cooper

- Music from the Gold Diggers (Sync Pulse, 1983)
- Oh Moscow (Victo, 1991)
- Rags & the Golddiggers (ReR, 1991)

With Pierre Dørge

- Pierre Dorge & New Jungle Orchestra (SteepleChase, 1982)
- Brikama (SteepleChase, 1984)
- Even the Moon Is Dancing (SteepleChase, 1985)
- Canoe (Olufsen, 1986)
- Johnny Lives (SteepleChase, 1987)

With Jan Garbarek

- Twelve Moons (ECM, 1993)
- Visible World (ECM, 1996)
- Rites (ECM, 1998)

With Makiko Hirabayashi

- Makiko (Enja, 2006)
- Hide and Seek (Enja, 2009)
- Surely (Yellowbird, 2013)
- Where the Sea Breaks (Yellowbird, 2017)

With others

- Frans Bak, Natsange (Stunt, 1999)
- Jon Balke, Further (ECM, 1994)
- Peter Bastian, Northern Lights (Fonix Musik 1997)
- Harry Beckett & Pierre Dorge, Echoez of... (Olufsen, 1990)
- Kirsten Braten Berg, Stemmenes Skygge (Heilo, 2005)
- Ketil Bjornstad, Floating (Universal/EmArcy, 2005)
- Ketil Bjornstad, La Notte (ECM, 2013)
- Kristian Blak, Antifonale (Tutl, 1987)
- Birgit Bruel, Den Hemmelige Rude (Exlibris, 1985)
- Etta Cameron & Nikolaj Hess, Etta (Stunt, 2009)
- Carsten Dahl, Short Fairytales (EmArcy, 2006)
- Lars Danielsson, European Voices (Dragon, 1995)
- Miles Davis, Aura (Columbia, 1989)
- Gil Evans & Laurent Cugny, Rhythm A Ning (EmArcy, 1988)
- Gil Evans & Laurent Cugny, Golden Hair (EmArcy/Mercury 1989)
- Yelena Eckemoff, Forget-me-not (L&H, 2011)
- Agnes Buen Garnas, Han Rider Den Morke Natt (Via Music 2002)
- Caroline Henderson, Made in Europe (Stunt, 2004)
- Nikolaj Hess, Playin (Music Mecca, 2000)
- Nikolaj Hess, Rhapsody (Cloud, 2016)
- Jan Gunnar Hoff, Fly North (Losen, 2014)
- Robert Irving III, Midnight Dream (Verve Forecast/Polygram 1988)
- Morten Kaersa, Morten Kaersa & Moonjam (Replay, 1987)
- Iver Kleive, Kyrie (Kirkelig Kulturverksted, 1994)
- Peter Kowald, Duos Europa (FMP, 1991)
- Wolfgang Lackerschmid, Gently but Deep (Bhakti, 1996)
- Wolfgang Lackerschmid, Colors (Hot Wire, 1997)
- Michala Petri, Brazilian Landscapes (2017)
- Jean-Michel Pilc, Composing (Storyville, 2015)
- Caecilie Norby, Sisters in Jazz (ACT, 2019)
- Charlie Mariano, Innuendo (Lipstick, 1992)
- Niels-Henning Ørsted Pedersen, Uncharted Land (Pladecompagniet, 1992)
- Rena Rama, Rena Rama with Marilyn Mazur (Dragon, 1989)
- Helge Sunde, Denada (ACT, 2006)
- Helge Sunde, Finding Nymo (ACT, 2009)
- Eje Thelin, E.T. Project Live at Nefertiti (Dragon, 1986)
- Trondheim Voices, Improvoicing (MNJ, 2010)
- Hans Ulrik, Strange World (Stunt, 1994)
- Hans Ulrik, Suite of Time (Stunt, 2015)
- Andreas Vollenweider, Dancing with the Lion (Columbia, 1989)
- Andreas Vollenweider, Book of Roses (Columbia, 1991)
- Dhafer Youssef, Divine Shadows (Jazzland, 2006)
- Eberhard Weber, Stages of a Long Journey (ECM, 2007)

== Sources ==
- "Jazzpar". www.jazzpar.dk. Archived from the original on 26 June 2006.
