= Fugue State Press =

New York publisher

Fugue State Press (established 1992) is a small New York City fiction publisher, specializing in the experimental novel. Novelist James Chapman is the founder and publisher.

It has published 28 titles to date, including work by Chapman, Joshua Cohen, Stephen Dixon, Noah Cicero, Shane Jones, Ben Brooks, Prakash Kona, Eckhard Gerdes, André Malraux, W. B. Keckler, Vi Khi Nao, J. A. Tyler, and I Rivers. Both American and international authors are represented. The books are distributed in the United States by Small Press Distribution (SPD).

== Books ==
Publications have included:

- Story of A Story and Other Stories: A Novel by Stephen Dixon
- Cadenza for the Schneidermann Violin Concerto by Joshua Cohen
- The Kingdom of Farfelu/Paper Moons by André Malraux
- The Human War by Noah Cicero
- Stet by James Chapman
- The Failure Six by Shane Jones
- Fences by Ben Brooks
- Streets that Smell of Dying Roses by Prakash Kona
