= Grow Up =

Grow Up may refer to:

- Advance in age
- Progress toward psychological maturity
- Grow Up (book), a 2007 book by Keith Allen
- Grow Up (video game), 2016 video game
- Grow Up (TV series), a 2015 Chinese television series
- "Grow Up" (Things You Should Have Done), a 2026 television episode

== Music ==
- Grow Up (Desperate Journalist album), 2017
- Grow Up (The Queers album), 1990
- Grow Up (Svoy album), 2011
- Grow Up, a 2015 EP by HALO
- "Grow Up" (Olly Murs song)
- "Grow Up" (Paramore song)
- "Grow Up" (Self song)
- "Grow Up", a song by Simple Plan from No Pads, No Helmets...Just Balls
- "Grow Up", a song by Rockwell
- "Grow Up", a song from the Bratz album Rock Angelz
- "Grow Up", a song by Cher Lloyd from Sticks and Stones

== See also ==
- Growing Up (disambiguation)
- Grow Up, Tony Phillips, a 2013 film by Emily Hagins
