= Keckley =

Keckley is a surname. Notable people with the surname include:

- Elizabeth Keckley (1818–1907), former slave, seamstress, civil activist, and author
- Jane Keckley (1876–1963), American actress

== See also ==
- Keckler
