= Stephen Dixon (author) =

American author (1936–2019)

- Born: Stephen Bruce Ditchik; June 6, 1936; New York City, U.S.
- Died: November 6, 2019 (aged 83); Towson, Maryland, U.S.
- Education: City College of New York
- Occupations: Author; academic

Stephen Dixon (born Stephen Bruce Ditchik; June 6, 1936 – November 6, 2019) was an American author of novels and short stories.

== Life and career ==
Dixon was born on June 6, 1936, in Manhattan, New York. He was the fifth of seven children of Florence Leder, a beauty queen, chorus girl on Broadway, and interior decorator, and Abraham M. Ditchik. He graduated from the City College of New York in 1958 and was a faculty member of Johns Hopkins University. Before becoming a full-time writer, Dixon worked a plethora of odd jobs ranging from bus driver to bartender. In his early 20s he worked as a journalist and in radio, interviewing such political figures as John F. Kennedy, Richard Nixon and Nikita Khrushchev.

Dixon was nominated for the National Book Award twice, in 1991 for Frog and in 1995 for Interstate. Frog, at 860 pages, was his longest and most ambitious novel, and garnered reviews comparing the work favorably to James Joyce's Ulysses. He also was awarded a Guggenheim Fellowship, the American Academy of Arts and Letters Prize for Fiction, the O. Henry Award, and the Pushcart Prize. He cited Anton Chekhov, Samuel Beckett, Franz Kafka, Thomas Bernhard, and James Joyce as some of his favorite authors.

Dixon died from complications of Parkinson's disease at a hospice center in Towson, Maryland, on November 6, 2019; he was 83.

== Works ==
=== Novels ===
- Work (Street Fiction Press, 1977)
- Too Late (Harper & Row, 1978)
- Fall & Rise (North Point Press, 1985)
- Garbage (Cane Hill Press, 1988)
- Frog (British American Publishing, 1991)
- Interstate (Henry Holt, 1995)
- Gould (Henry Holt, 1997)
- 30: Pieces of a Novel (Henry Holt, 1999)
- Tisch (Red Hen Press, 2000) (his first completed novel, written 1961–1969)
- I. (McSweeney's, 2002)
- Old Friends (Melville House Publishing, 2004)
- Phone Rings (Melville House Publishing, 2005)
- End of I. (McSweeney's, 2006)
- Meyer (Melville House Publishing, 2007)
- Story of a Story and Other Stories: A Novel (Fugue State Press), 2012
- His Wife Leaves Him (Fantagraphics Books), 2013
- Letters to Kevin (Fantagraphics Books), 2016
- Beatrice (Publishing Genius), 2016

=== Story collections ===
- No Relief (Street Fiction Press, 1976)
- Quite Contrary: The Mary and Newt Story (Harper & Row, 1979)
- 14 Stories (Johns Hopkins, 1980)
- Movies: Seventeen Stories (North Point Press, 1983)
- Time to Go (Will and Magna Stories) (Johns Hopkins, 1984)
- The Play and Other Stories (Coffee House Press, 1988)
- Love and Will: Twenty Stories (Paris Review Editions / British American Publishing, 1989)
- All Gone: 18 Short Stories (Johns Hopkins, 1990)
- Friends: More Will and Magna Stories (Asylum Arts, 1990)
- Long Made Short (Johns Hopkins, 1994)
- The Stories of Stephen Dixon (Henry Holt, 1994)
- Man on Stage: Play Stories (Hi Jinx Press, 1996)
- Sleep (Coffee House Press, 1999)
- The Switch (Rain Taxi, 1999) (a single story; Rain Taxi Brainstorm Series, Number 3)
- What Is All This?: The Uncollected Stories of Stephen Dixon (Fantagraphics Books, 2010)
- Late Stories (Trnsfr Books, 2016)
- Dear Abigail and Other Stories (Trnsfr Books, 2019)
- Writing, Written (Fantagraphics Books, 2019)

=== In anthologies and magazines ===
- "The Chess House", in The Paris Review, no. 29 (1963)
- "Making a Break", in Making a Break: Volume Two, New Departures in Fiction, ed. Robert and Rochelle Bonazzi (Latitudes Press, 1975)
- "Sleep", in The Best American Short Stories 1996, ed. John Edgar Wideman (Houghton Mifflin, 1996)

== See also ==
- Stephen Dixon Award
