= James Chapman (author) =

American novelist and publisher

James Chapman (born 1955) is an American novelist and publisher. He was raised in Bakersfield, California, has lived in New York City since 1978, and is the author of ten novels to date.

His work combines experimental technique with a direct emotionality, often dealing with the anguish inherent in human communication.

Excerpted in many print and online magazines, his work has won a Notable Stories in StorySouth's Million Writers Award, and been nominated four times for the Pushcart Prize.

== Earlier books (to 2000) ==
In his first novel, Our Plague (A Film from New York) (1993), the protagonist is an underground filmmaker alienated from his own body, disgusted by his own careerism, and awash in apocalyptic visions. Not a lucid book, rather a difficult one, though energetic and full of unexpected choices.

The story in the brief The Walls Collide as You Expand, Dwarf Maple (1993) seems almost desiccated: a young woman grows up, meets a man on a train, and lives with him in a city. The writing, as such, is simple and spare, unlike that of his other books.

Glass (Pray the Electrons Back to Sand) (1994), a "Television-War Novel" about the first Gulf War, blurs reality into its electronic media equivalent, to suggest a new, amoral, surrealistically detached technological level to the old horrors of war. The nearest to a conventional novel by this author.

In Candyland It's Cool to Feed on Your Friends (1998), a strangely knotted and personal work, deals with an indigent photographer who loses his closest friends for the crime of having exploited them for his artwork. The frame provided for the narrative strongly implies that something like this took place in the author's own life.

The visionary, messianic heroine of Daughter! I Forbid Your Recurring Dream! (2000) flings herself into all manner of self-expression, but willfully loses faith in each attempt at meaning, and each time ends up more broken, more solitary.

== Later books ==
Stet (2006), Chapman's most ambitious book to date, takes the form of a bitter "Russian novel" about an ecstatic and weirdly oblivious Soviet filmmaker and painter, who ends up in prison camp as punishment for his private and antisocial tendencies.

How is This Going to Continue? (2007), a shorter work in the form of an oratorio libretto, seems to carry the artist-figure, a composer this time, further into private grief and alienation. The subject of this "libretto" is the death of the composer's wife, followed by the composer's own death. The novel, if such it is, consists entirely of quotations from other sources (many of which are, however, invented).

Degenerescence (2009) appears as a kind of endpoint of this alienated phase, where the author has finally turned away from the last of his own recognizable mannerisms, in favor of pseudo-ancient repetitive incantation about how the invention of narrative story causes the destruction of the hymn foundation of the world: what might be called a home-made Sumerian myth.

The Rat Veda (2010), for all its dire setting (its "hero" is a rat in the subway), in fact marks a change for the brighter, in that as the rat waits to transcend his self-made imprisonment, he worships beauty in the form of an idealized love, a dancer who seems to exist just over his head.

Qurratulain (2012) might be seen as the last in a "religious" trilogy (Degenerescence having drawn imagery from Sumerian myth, and The Rat Veda from devotional Hinduism). A Christian priest in the time of the monastic Desert Fathers falls in love with the title character, and together they go to the desert to pray and argue with God. As in Rat Veda, beauty and ecstatic love seem to outweigh all other aspects of existence.

== Novels ==
- Our Plague (A Film from New York) [1993]
- The Walls Collide as You Expand, Dwarf Maple [1993]
- Glass (Pray the Electrons Back to Sand) [1994]
- In Candyland It's Cool to Feed on Your Friends [1998]
- Daughter! I Forbid Your Recurring Dream! [2000]
- Stet [2006]
- How is This Going to Continue? [2007]
- Degenerescence [2009]
- The Rat Veda [2010]
- Qurratulain [2012]

== In anthologies ==
- Avant Garde for the New Millennium, edited by Forrest Armstrong (Raw Dog Screaming Press) [2008].
- Hatter Bones, edited by Paul Jessup (Evil Nerd Empire) [2009].

== Chapbook ==
- Don’t Give Up & Die, Don’t Push Me Into the Blackness, No, Life Is Impossible, We Agree, Stay With Me in Hiding, Exile Together Is Better than Death, They Won’t Find Us, They Won’t Mock at You Again, They Won’t Kick Me Again, We’ll Float Above Them, We’ll Feed Each Other with Fruits They Don’t Know How to Find, We Won’t Speak Their Language Anymore, Our Lungs Will Fill with Light (ML Press, 2008)

== As publisher ==
Chapman also operates Fugue State Press, a publisher of "advanced and experimental fiction" which has published a peculiar assortment of work by Noah Cicero, Ben Brooks, Joshua Cohen, André Malraux, Prakash Kona, and others. Chapman has referred to the press as "an orphanage for the unpublishable," indicating that the work is not commercially viable in the current publishing marketplace.
