= Night Moves (poetry collection) =

2013 book by Stephanie Barber

- Author: Stephanie Barber
- Language: English
- Genre: poetry
- Publisher: Publishing Genius
- Publication date: February 2013
- Publication place: United States of America
- Media type: Print (paperback)
- ISBN: 978-0-9887503-0-2

Night Moves is a 2013 poetry book by Stephanie Barber which consists of a portion of comments posted to YouTube on the music video of the 1976 song "Night Moves" by Bob Seger. The nostalgic and relatable comments and the large amount of cultural references Barber saw here are compiled in this work of conceptual writing.

== Bob Seger's "Night Moves" ==
According to Slate, “Night Moves” was a 70s FM radio classic. In an article edited from interviews in The Wall Street Journal, Seger (age 70 at the time) reflects on when he was 30 and wrote “Night Moves” as a reflection on his childhood and coming of age.

== Content ==
The book contains 75 pages worth of comments from the YouTube music video. The majority of these comments are instances of people relating to the song lyrics. Many comments are memories of commenters, such as this one: “Love this song…I remember this song and dancing around singing it, stereo as loud as it would go…” A few times a series of comments appear as a conversation between two listeners, more often than not arguing about music. For example, one commenter wrote, “You claim this song is boring but I think what you are missing is that it is a “Mood” song. It might not have interesting melodies and chord changes but to Add these you would Subtract from the “Mood.” Some of the best songs are the simplest and this you do not understand.” Another disagreement ensues when one commenter states that they are a rapper and other commenters attack the original commenter’s career, claiming that being a rapper is a sad excuse for a career.

As cultural references go, many commenters mention what brought them to find the song on YouTube. These references include the television programs How I Met Your Mother, That '70s Show, Top Gear, and the video game Grand Theft Auto V. There was also a one-line parody of the song featured in 30 Rock, remaking the main chorus phrase to be "Workin' on my night cheese..." instead of the original, "Workin' on my night moves...".

== Reception ==
According to a review by Barrett Warner, Barber’s work transformed a common 2013 discussion on YouTube into something much more romanticized and cryptic at times. However, in the same review, Warner touches upon how Barber’s book promotes poetry that is more about the big picture or the extended metaphor, than an actual concrete narrative. and of the ability of people to connect through music, there have been some critics of the form of the work, specifically the fact that it is simply copy-and-pasted and that is uncreative. Another discussion of the book remarks that while Night Moves is a conceptual book, it is not only conceptual.
