= Golden Hair (album) =

Studio album by Gil Evans / Laurent Cugny
- Released: 1989
- Recorded: November 2–3 & 26, 1987
- Venue: Paris
- Studio: Studio Acousti
- Genre: Jazz
- Length: 58:55
- Label: EmArcy 838 773-2
- Producer: Laurent Cugny

Gil Evans chronology
| Rhythm A Ning (1988) | Golden Hair (1989) | Heroes (1991) |

Golden Hair is an album by jazz composer, arranger, conductor and keyboardist Gil Evans recorded in 1987 and performed by Evans with Laurent Cugny's Big Band Lumiere.

== Reception ==
Allmusic awarded the album 3 stars.

Professional ratings
Review scores
| Source | Rating |
|---|---|
| Allmusic | 3/5 stars |

== Track listing ==
All compositions by Gil Evans except as indicated

1. "Golden Hair" (Laurent Cugny) - 14:37
2. "Orange Was the Color of Her Dress, Then Blue Silk" (Charles Mingus) - 11:06
3. "Zee Zee" - 8:31
4. "C Blues" - 8:13
5. "Parabola" (Alan Shorter) - 10:00
6. "Goodbye Pork Pie Hat" (Mingus) - 6:28
- Recorded at Studio Acousti in Paris on November 3 (tracks 1, 3 & 6) & November 26 (tracks 2, 4 & 5), 1987

== Personnel ==
- Gil Evans - piano, electric piano, arranger, conductor
- Laurent Cugny - keyboards, arranger, conductor
- Christian Martinez, Stéphane Belmondo, François Chassagnite - trumpet
- Denis Barbier - flute
- Bobby Rangell - alto saxophone, soprano saxophone
- Pierre-Olivier Govin - alto saxophone
- Andy Sheppard, Charles Schneider - tenor saxophone
- Bernard François - French horn
- Gilles Salommez - trombone
- Philippe Legris - tuba
- Manuel Rocheman - piano
- Benoît de Mesmay - keyboards
- Lionel Benhamou - guitar
- Dominique Di Piazza - bass guitar
- Stéphane Huchard - drums
- Xavier Desandre, Marilyn Mazur - percussion
