= Nikolaj Hess =

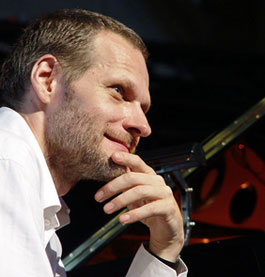

Background information
- Genres: Jazz
- Occupations: Pianist, composer, bandleader
- Instrument: Piano
- Labels: Sony, Sunnyside Records
- Website: nikolajhess.com

Nikolaj Hess is a Danish jazz pianist, composer, producer and arranger.

== Biography ==
Hess won the gold prize in the Berlingske Tidendes competition of non-classical music in Copenhagen and won the category for best European jazz piano player under 25, in the RAI competition in Rome (1991). Having graduated from the Rhythmic Music Conservatory at 22, he was the first to get the top grade for his concert performance in piano, his main subject.

Hess has composed and arranged for solo pianists, small groups, large string ensemble, big band, choirs and saxophone quartets. He has also written music for the Danish film company Zentropa for Lars Von Trier's Melancholia (2011), Tju Bang Film and the German Meeres Stille (2013) as well as for radio (DR, NKR, Hungarian Radio), Den Kongelige Ballet, Det Kongelige Teater, dance companies, and installations in collaborations with visual artists.

He has numerous recordings as a composer, bandleader, and co-composer:

- "Spacelab", "Nikolaj Hess Global Motion +", "Nikolaj Hess Trio", "Sissel Vera Pettersen / Nikolaj Hess", 3xHess, Hessismore
- collaborations with Caroline Henderson, Marc Mommaas, Hess/Lund/Waidtløew/McBride, Ulla Henningsen

Hess has been awarded many grants from the Danish government, as well as from private foundations, which has twice included the Bikuben Foundation artist-in-residence in New York. He was nominated for best jazz album of the year at the Danish Music Awards in 2013 and 2014.

Hess is associate professor at the Rhythmic Conservatory in Copenhagen as well as the Art Director of Summersession, an educational program for professional musicians organized by JazzDanmark.

Hess has also taught at New School University in New York, The Royal Danish Conservatory of Music, Conservatoire National Superieur de Music de Paris, Funda College, South Africa; Shuttle 2002 South Africa; IASJ 10th annual congress in Köln, and Conservatory of Non classical Music in Århus, and William Paterson University New Jersey.

Among the list of artists Hess has worked with are Marc Mommaas, Tony Moreno, John Hebert, Jay Andersen, Christian McBride, Kenny Wollesen, Jeff Ballard, Lee Konitz, Benny Golson, Fela Kuti, Femi Kuti, Hal Willner, James Genus, Ambrose Akinmusire, Rez Abassi, Ben Monder, Satoshi Takeishi, Ben Street, Francois Moutin, Marilyn Mazur, Greg Hutchinson, Essiet Okon Essiet, Donny McCaslin, Jochen Rueckert, Jesper Lundgaard, Mads Vinding, Alex Riel, Lars Danielsson, Jacob Fisher, Johannes Weidenmuller, Tom Rainey, Cameron Brown, Sissel Vera Petersen, Hans Ulrik, Chris Minh Doky. Ulla Henningsen, Julee Cruise, Jamey Haddad, Ed Neumeister, Danny Gottlieb, James Genus, David Liebman, Hal Crook, Harwie Swartz, Jean Luc Ponty, Marcello Pelletiri, Andrea Marcelli, Michael Blair, Kysia Bostic, Ed Howard, Youron Israels, Dennis Charles, Doug Raney, Cæcilie Norby, Debbie Cameron, Lars Hug, Bob Rockwell, Jukka Perko, Severy Pyssalo, Ed Thigpen, Kenneth Bager, Peter Poulsen, Copenhagen Art Ensemble, Annisette Koppel, and Ane Trolle.

== Discography ==
- By This River with Sissel Vera Pettersen (Music for Dreams, 2006)
- A Word with Sissel Vera Pettersen (Calibrated, 2009)
- The Champ (Stunt, 2009)
- Etta with Etta Cameron (Stunt, 2009)
- Global Motion + (Stunt, 2010)
- Trio with Tony Scherr, Kenny Wollesen (Gateway Music, 2013)
- Rhapsody: Impressions of Hammershi with Mikkel Hess, Marilyn Mazur, Anders Christensen (Cloud, 2016)
- Willow with Foyn Friis, Anders Christensen, Daniel Sommer (Foyn, 2018)
- Spacelab & Strings (Sunnyside, 2021)
