= Heroes (Gil Evans and Lee Konitz album) =

Live album by Gil Evans and Lee Konitz
- Released: 1991
- Recorded: January 11–12, 1980
- Venue: Greene Street, NYC
- Genre: Jazz
- Length: 53:08
- Label: Verve/Remark; 511 621-2
- Producer: John Snyder

Gil Evans chronology
Golden Hair (1989)	Heroes (1991)	Anti-Heroes (1991)

Lee Konitz chronology
Zounds (1991)	Heroes (1991)	Anti-Heroes (1991)

Heroes is a live album by pianist Gil Evans and saxophonist Lee Konitz recorded in New York in 1980 and released on the French Verve label.

== Critical reception ==
Professional ratings
Review scores
Source	Rating
Allmusic	2/5 stars

The Allmusic review stated "Since Evans was far from a virtuoso and at best played "arranger's piano" (particularly at this late stage in his life), his accompaniment behind Konitz is quite sparse ... overall this is a rather uneventful and often dull release that can easily be passed by".

== Track listing ==
1. "Prince of Darkness" (Wayne Shorter) – 6:08
2. "Reincarnation of a Lovebird" (Charles Mingus) – 6:45
3. "Aprilling" (Lee Konitz) – 8:23
4. "What Am I Here For?" (Duke Ellington) – 6:13
5. "All the Things You Are" (Jerome Kern, Oscar Hammerstein II) – 6:49
6. "Prelude No. 20 in C Minor, Opus 28" (Frédéric Chopin) – 6:15
7. "Blues Improvisation/Zee Zee" (Gil Evans) – 6:14
8. "Lover Man (Oh, Where Can You Be?)" (Jimmy Davis, Ram Ramirez, Jimmy Sherman) – 6:21

== Personnel ==
- Lee Konitz – alto saxophone, soprano saxophone
- Gil Evans – piano
