= Anti-Heroes (Lee Konitz and Gil Evans album) =

Live album by Lee Konitz and Gil Evans
- Released: 1991
- Recorded: January 11–12, 1980
- Venue: Greene Street, NYC
- Genre: Jazz
- Length: 53:36
- Label: Verve/Remark; 511 622-2
- Producer: John Snyder

Lee Konitz chronology
Heroes (1991)	Anti-Heroes (1991)	Lunasea (1992)

Gil Evans chronology
Heroes (1991)	Anti-Heroes (1991)	Farewell (1992)

Anti-Heroes is an album by saxophonist Lee Konitz and pianist Gil Evans recorded in New York in 1980 and released on the French Verve label.

== Critical reception ==
Professional ratings
Review scores
Source	Rating
Allmusic	2/5 stars

The Allmusic review stated "the music is rather disappointing for, although Konitz plays fairly well on the mixture of standards and obscurities, Evans often wanders and his backing of the saxophonist is sparse and erratic. The results are more important historically than musically".

== Track listing ==
1. "Orange Was the Color of Her Dress, Then Blue Silk" (Charles Mingus) - 8:53
2. "The Moon Struck One" (Robbie Robertson) - 9:18
3. "Drizzling Rain (驟雨, Syu-u)" (Masabumi Kikuchi) - 6:30
4. "Gee, Baby, Ain't I Good to You" (Andy Razaf, Don Redman) - 9:02
5. "The Buzzard Song" (George Gershwin, Ira Gershwin, DuBose Heyward) - 5:11
6. "How Insensitive" (Antônio Carlos Jobim, Vinícius de Moraes) - 9:53
7. "Copenhagen Sight" (Gil Evans) - 4:49

== Personnel ==
- Lee Konitz – alto saxophone, soprano saxophone
- Gil Evans – piano
