= Stet (novel) =

2006 novel by James Chapman

- Stet, by James Chapman (Cover painting by Michael Hafftka)
- Author: James Chapman
- Language: English
- Publisher: Fugue State Press
- Publication date: 2006
- Publication place: United States

Stet is a novel by the American author James Chapman, published by Fugue State Press in 2006.

== Plot summary ==
Stet tells the life story of a visionary Soviet filmmaker named Stet who lives through Stalin's repressions, manages to direct his first feature film, but ends up in a prison camp for various offenses against the bureaucracy.

The novel is narrated in a "Russian" voice, by an ostensible third-person narrator who is nevertheless full of opinions and bitter aphorisms. Despite his third-person status, the narrator seems to be a major character in the book.

The tone of the book is black humor, and often entirely pessimistic, as it delineates the difficulties of living as an artist who does not accept or worry about the judgments of his surrounding world. Yet the character of the filmmaker Stet, to whom aesthetic ecstasy remains available throughout his trials, seems to give the reader an alternative to the pessimism of the narrator.

== Themes ==
- Stet is a proofreader's mark which means "let it stand," i.e. "ignore this correction." In the context of the novel, the character's name seems to be a plea that the world cease to "correct" him, and allow him his way along his incorrect path.
- The filmmaker depicted here sometimes bears a strong resemblance to Sergei Parajanov, a Soviet-era filmmaker who was repeatedly imprisoned for his work.
