= Bill Barber (musician) =

American jazz tubist (1920–2007)

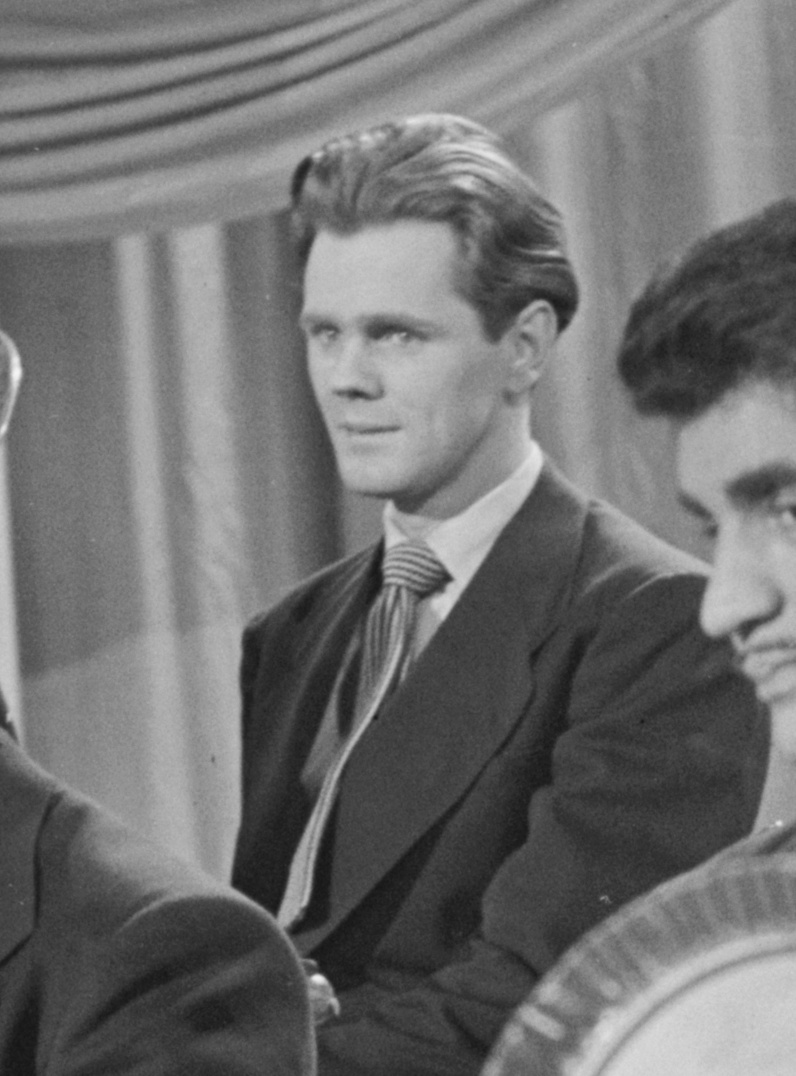

Background information
- Born: John William Barber; May 21, 1920; Hornell, New York
- Died: June 18, 2007 (aged 87) Bronxville, New York
- Genres: Jazz, swing
- Occupation: Musician
- Instrument: Tuba
- Years active: 1940s–2004
- Formerly of: Miles Davis

John William Barber (May 21, 1920 – June 18, 2007) was an American jazz tubist. He is considered by many to be the first person to play tuba in modern jazz. He recorded with Miles Davis on the albums Birth of the Cool, Sketches of Spain, and Miles Ahead.

== Early life and career ==
Barber was born John William Barber in Hornell, New York in 1920. He started playing tuba in high school and studied at the Juilliard School of Music. After graduating, he travelled west to Kansas City, Missouri, where he played with the Kansas City Philharmonic and various ballet and theatre orchestras.

== Jazz musician ==
He joined the United States Army in 1942 and played in Patton's 7th army band for three years. Bill is quoted as often telling his family "I never killed anybody with my tuba". After the war, he started playing jazz, joining Claude Thornhill's big band where he became friends with trombonist Al Langstaff, pianist Gil Evans and saxophone player Gerry Mulligan in 1947. Barber was one of the first tuba players to play in a modern jazz style, playing solos and participating in intricate ensemble pieces.

Barber became a founding member of Miles Davis's nonet in 1949 in what became known as the Birth of the Cool recording sessions. He then worked in the theatre pit orchestras of The King and I, Paradiso, and the City Center Ballet. He joined up with Davis and Gil Evans in the late 1950s to record the albums Sketches of Spain, Miles Ahead and Porgy and Bess. Barber also played tuba on John Coltrane's album Africa/Brass released in 1961.

== Later career ==
Barber completed a master's degree from the Manhattan School of Music and became an elementary school music teacher at Copiague, New York. He continued to play where possible including with the Goldman Band. In 1992, he recorded and toured with a nonet led by Gerry Mulligan, reworking material from Birth of the Cool. From 1998 to 2004 he was part of The Seatbelts, New York musicians who played the music of the Japanese anime Cowboy Bebop. He died of heart failure in June 2007 in Bronxville, New York.

His granddaughter is filmmaker Stephanie Barber.

== Discography ==
With Art Blakey

- Golden Boy (Colpix, 1964)

With Bob Brookmeyer

- Portrait of the Artist (Atlantic, 1960)

With Kenny Burrell

- Guitar Forms (Verve, 1964)

With John Coltrane

- Africa/Brass (Impulse!, 1961)
- The Africa/Brass Sessions, Volume 2 (Impulse!, 1961 [1974])

With Miles Davis

- Birth of the Cool (Capitol, 1950 [1957])
- Miles Ahead (Columbia, 1957)
- Porgy and Bess (Columbia, 1959)
- Sketches of Spain (Columbia, 1960)
- Quiet Nights (Columbia, 1962)

With Gil Evans

- New Bottle Old Wine (Pacific Jazz, 1958)
- Great Jazz Standards (Pacific Jazz, 1959)
- Out of the Cool (Impulse!, 1960)
- The Individualism of Gil Evans (Verve, 1964)

With Urbie Green

- All About Urbie Green and His Big Band (ABC-Paramount, 1956)

With Gigi Gryce

- Nica's Tempo (Savoy, 1955 [1958])

With Slide Hampton

- Sister Salvation (Atlantic, 1960)

With Gerry Mulligan

- Re-birth of the Cool (GRP, 1992)

With Pete Rugolo

- Rugolomania (Columbia, 1955)
- New Sounds by Pete Rugolo (Harmony, 1954–55, [1957])

With Hal McKusick

- The Jazz Workshop (RCA Victor, 1957)
