= Bud and Bird =

Live album by Gil Evans & the Monday Night Orchestra
- Released: 1987
- Recorded: December 1 and 22, 1986
- Venues: Sweet Basil, New York City
- Genre: Jazz
- Length: 66:30
- Label: King
- Producers: Horst Liepolt, Shigeyuki Kawashima

Gil Evans chronology
Collaboration (1987)	Bud and Bird (1987)	Paris Blues (1988)

Bud and Bird is a live album by Gil Evans that won the Grammy Award for Best Large Jazz Ensemble Album in 1989. Evans conducted the orchestra, which included Hamiet Bluiett, Bill Evans, and Johnny Coles.

== Reception ==
Professional ratings
Review scores
Source	Rating
Allmusic	3/5 stars

In 1989, the album received the Grammy Award for Best Large Jazz Ensemble Album posthumously. Allmusic awarded the album 3 stars stating "Some critics rapped Evans' '80s orchestras for their almost chaotic sound and loose feel. But Evans wanted a sprawling sensibility, and although his bands often seemed disorganized, they always maintained discipline in the midst of what others thought sounded like musical anarchy".

== Track listing ==
1. "Bud and Bird" (Gil Evans) - 8:48
2. "Half Man, Half Cookie" (Bill Evans) - 10:27
3. "Gates - Illuminations" (Mark Egan) - 17:40
4. "Nicaragua Blues" (Tom Malone) - 7:44
5. "Groove from the Louvre" (John Clark) - 21:51
- Recorded at Sweet Basil Jazz Club in NYC on December 1, 1986 (tracks 2 & 3) and December 22, 1986 (tracks 1, 4 & 5)

== Personnel ==
- Gil Evans – piano, electric piano, arranger, conductor
- Lew Soloff, Shunzo Ohno, Miles Evans – trumpet
- Johnny Coles – flugelhorn (track 5)
- Dave Bargeron – trombone
- Dave Taylor – bass trombone
- John Clark – French horn, hornette, arranger
- Chris Hunter – alto sax, soprano sax, flute
- Bill Evans – tenor sax, soprano sax, flute, arranger
- Hamiet Bluiett – baritone sax, clarinet, bass clarinet
- Hiram Bullock – guitar
- Pete Levin, Gil Goldstein – keyboards
- Mark Egan – bass guitar, arranger
- Danny Gottlieb – drums
