= Shane Jones (author) =

American poet

Shane Jonas
- Born: February 22, 1980 (age 46); Albany, New York, U.S.
- Education: University at Buffalo (BA); New York State Writers Institute
- Occupations: Novelist; writer; essayist; poet
- Writing career
- Genres: Literary fiction, poetry, magical realism, minimalism
- Notable work: Light Boxes

Shane Jones (born February 22, 1980) is an American novelist, short story writer, essayist, and poet. He has published three novels, two books of poetry, and one novella.

== Personal life ==
Shane Jones was born in Albany, New York. He graduated from SUNY Buffalo in 2004 with a B.A. in English. As of May 2015, Jones is represented by the literary agency Dunow, Carlson & Lerner. He was a student in Lydia Davis's fiction workshop taught at the NYS Writers Institute.

== Critical response ==
Jones's novels have received mixed reviews and little attention from mainstream venues. On June 3, 2010, Bookforum, in a positive review, wrote: "Light Boxes is absurd, cryptic, and often bizarre, but if you're willing to roll with it, all is made clear by the end (and is quite satisfying). This book is not for everyone – but that, of course, is one of its virtues." That same day, The A.V. Club said, "Jones suffers from seasonal depression, and while his depiction of a town where February lasts all year benefits from his real feelings of dread, its greatest weakness is going too far into autobiography." Later in the same month, writing in The Guardian, critic Steven Poole wrote: "In its pre-industrial surrealism, the world here at first resembles slightly that of Ben Marcus...But Jones's is a saccharine version of the style, too concerned to be pretty or childlike (with its owls and teacups and mint leaves) to provoke any real aesthetic shock within a single sentence." Booklist said, "This literary gem of metaphysical malaise has that ideally weird blend of offputting sensualism and heartfelt emotion – just the sort of thing to ensure a dedicated, if limited, following." BlackBook said, "This slim and absorbing novel reads like a bedtime story that your mother forgot to tell you, and it announces Jones as a stunning new literary voice."

Rivka Galchen has praised Jones's work as "Resplendent, and somehow nearly edible." The praise was satirically criticized by Ben Crair on August 6, 2013, at The New Republic.

On December 21, 2010, NPR listed Light Boxes as one of its Best Books of 2010.

In July 2012, W Magazine wrote positively about Jones's second novel (published July 31, 2012) Daniel Fights a Hurricane: "A surreal and playful postmodern fable about an epic struggle against a villainous force-of-nature, with a surprisingly human love story of intriguing complexity." Later in the year, Paste Magazine praised the novel in a 9.0 rating (out of 10.0), writing: "Unhinged or sane, grieving or resolute, the Suppletons represent a kind of hero seldom seen in today’s texts. We’ve been missing them." Publishers Weekly, in a negative review, wrote: "Admirers of Italo Calvino and Richard Brautigan will appreciate Jones's sensibility, but an unsatisfying surreal conclusion keeps the work from achieving its full potential."

Jones's most recent novel, Crystal Eaters, was released on June 9, 2014. On February 4, 2014, Buzzfeed Books listed Crystal Eaters as one of the most highly anticipated books of the year. Publishers Weekly, in a negative review published on April 29, 2014, wrote: "Jones recreates a mythical and hallucinatory experience of a family fighting mortality...But, ultimately, undeveloped characters, excessive ungrounded tangents, and general disorganization obscure a lovely premise."

Crystal Eaters received attention from a variety of magazines and websites, including: The Paris Review, Time Out New York, VICE, The Believer, Full Stop, The L Magazine, The Rumpus, American Book Review, Numero Cinq, Bookslut, Los Angeles Review of Books, The Millions, Electric Literature, Impose Magazine, and Vanity Fair. Flavorwire included Crystal Eaters on several lists, including: 10 Must Read Books of July, The 50 Best Genre-Bending Books, 50 Excellent Fabulist Books Everyone Should Read, and as a Best Book of the Year. The now defunct literary journal HTMLGIANT, of which Jones was an original contributor, ran an unprecedented four positive reviews of the novel between April 14, 2014, and September 16, 2014. Rebecca Rubenstin, the former interviews editor for The Rumpus, and editor-in-chief of Midnight Breakfast, wrote: "Crystal Eaters is dreamlike and devastating, with language that affixes itself to your bones and won’t let go, even long after you’ve finished. I can’t recommend it more highly."

On July 21, 2014, an intentionally controversial essay/review by Lee Klein published by 3:AM Magazine discussed Crystal Eaters in terms of "literary citizenship" and the conflict a writer feels when reading a novel with intent to review to either support and dishonestly hype or uphold personal standards and present an honest review, sparking an online debate regarding how authors review each other and a lengthy response the following day from Edward Champion of The Bat Segundo Show, who wrote, "Jones is a smart and imaginative writer," while deeply criticizing Klein who said, regarding Crystal Eaters, "I probably would've preferred if I didn't often catch myself zoning out and then backtracking to identify the sentence or passage that triggered the zone out. The language often seemed rushed and like it strived for a style that required rereading and translation."

== Film and theater adaptation ==
In August 2009, Jones sold the film option to his first novel, Light Boxes, to Spike Jonze, with speculations that Ray Tintori would direct. However, Spike Jonze, in an interview with Times Online, said that Tintori was no longer a director for the project. In an interview with Interview Magazine in June 2010, Jones (author) said the film option had been dropped.

Light Boxes was originally published in a small run of 500 to 600 copies by Publishing Genius Press. After the securing of the rights by Jonze, and subsequent pickup by William Morris Agency, the novel was reissued by Penguin Books and sold to publishing houses across Europe.

Several directors have shown interest in Light Boxes, including filmmaker Ellen Frances who began development in 2012. As of 2015 the film option is available.

In early 2015, it was announced by Grid Iron Theatre Company that Light Boxes would run as its featured play for the duration of the 2015 Edinburgh Festival Fringe.

== Plagiarism accusation ==
On April 1, 2010, author Salvador Plascencia, in an interview with Nashville Review, stated: "Light Boxes freeloads off and piggybacks on the work of The People of Paper and does so without any formal acknowledgement. And, in many ways, unless you want to buy some hackneyed and anachronistic surrealist defense, it's a novella dependent on The People of Paper to make any real sense."

Jones detailed his experiencing of being accused of plagiarism in an essay published at VICE on October 8, 2013, where he implied that the film adaptation by Spike Jonze had been dropped because of Plascencia's plagiarism accusation.

== Bibliography ==
Novels

- Light Boxes, Publishing Genius Press, 2009; reissue Penguin Books, 2010.
- Daniel Fights a Hurricane, Penguin Books, 2012.
- Crystal Eaters, Two Dollar Radio, 2014.
- Vincent and Alice and Alice and Alice, Tyrant Books, 2019.

Poetry

- A Cake Appeared, Scrambler Books, 2010.
- Paper Champion, with illustrations by John Dermot Woods. Civil Coping Mechanisms, 2014.

Novellas

- The Failure Six, Fugue State Press, 2010.

Stories

- I Will Unfold You with My Hairy Hands, The Greying Ghost, 2008.
