= Paris Blues (Gil Evans and Steve Lacy album) =

Studio album by Gil Evans and Steve Lacy
- Released: 1988
- Recorded: November 30 & December 1, 1987
- Studio: Family Sound, Paris
- Genre: Jazz
- Length: 59:30
- Label: Owl (OWL 049 CD)
- Producer: François Lemaire, Jean-Jacques Pussiau

Gil Evans chronology
Bud and Bird (1987)	Paris Blues (1988)	Rhythm A Ning (1988)

Steve Lacy chronology
The Window (1988)	Paris Blues (1988)	The Door (1989)

Paris Blues is an album of duets by pianist Gil Evans and saxophonist Steve Lacy, recorded in Paris in 1987 and released on the French Owl label. The album was Evans' final studio recording before his death in 1988. The album was released in the US on Sunnyside Records in 2003.

== Reception ==
Professional ratings
Review scores
Source	Rating
AllMusic	1.5/5 stars
The Penguin Guide to Jazz	3/4 stars

The AllMusic review by Scott Yanow stated, "In truth, Evans's playing here is generally little more than melody statements and comping behind Lacy and, although the soprano is in top form, little of significance occurs... of greater interest from a historical standpoint than musical". The Penguin Guide to Jazz observed, "it's scarcely a momentous occasion, musically speaking, for either man... Interesting to hear Lacy at work on his music, but in the end the results are merely light and agreeable".

== Track listing ==
1. "Reincarnation of a Lovebird" (Charles Mingus) – 7:05
2. "Paris Blues" (Duke Ellington) – 5:17
3. "Esteem" (Steve Lacy) – 9:07
4. "Orange Was the Color of Her Dress Then Blue Silk" (Mingus) – 14:42
5. "Goodbye Pork Pie Hat (Mingus) – 8:42
6. "Jelly Roll" (Gil Evans) – 5:43 (bonus track on CD)
7. "Esteem" (Lacy) – 8:54 (bonus track on CD)

== Personnel ==
- Gil Evans – piano, electric piano
- Steve Lacy – soprano saxophone
