= Growing Up =

Growing Up or Growin' Up may refer to:

- Ageing, growing older
- Adulting, an Internet neologism for growing up
- Progressing toward psychological maturity

== Film ==
- Growing Up (1971 film), a British sex education film
- Growing Up (1983 film), a Taiwanese film
- Growing Up (1996 film), a Hong Kong film of 1996

== Literature ==
- Growing Up (memoir), a 1982 memoir by Russell Baker
- Growing Up (novella) or Takekurabe, an 1895–1896 novella by Higuchi Ichiyō

== Music ==
=== Albums ===
- Growing Up (Hi-Standard album) or the title song, 1996
- Growing Up (IU album), 2009
- Growing Up (The Linda Lindas album) or the title song, 2022
- Growing Up Live, a 2003 concert film and 2019 album by Peter Gabriel
- Growing Up, an EP by Mr FijiWiji, 2015
- Growing Up, an album by Alli Walker, 2023
- Growin' Up (The Kelly Family album), 1997
- Growin' Up (Luke Combs album), 2022

=== Songs ===
- "Growing Up" (Peter Gabriel song), by Peter Gabriel, 2002
- "Growin' Up" (song), by Bruce Springsteen, 1973
- "Dammit (Growing Up)", by Blink-182, 1997
- "Growing Up", by Fall Out Boy from Fall Out Boy's Evening Out with Your Girlfriend, 2003
- "Growing Up", by Jason Lancaster from As You Are, 2014
- "Growing Up", by Lisa Lougheed from Evergreen Nights, 1988
- "Growing Up", by the Maine from Black & White, 2010
- "Growing Up", by Stephen Bishop from the film Care Bears Movie II: A New Generation, 1986
- "Growing Up", by Thomas Rhett from Country Again: Side A, 2021
- "Growing Up", by Whodini from Back in Black, 1986
- "Growing Up (Sloane's Song)", by Macklemore and Ryan Lewis from This Unruly Mess I've Made, 2016

== Television ==
- Growing Up (1997 Philippine TV series), a 1997–1999 youth drama series
- Growing Up (2011 Philippine TV series), a 2011–2012 youth drama series
- Growing Up (Singaporean TV series), a 1996–2001 English-language drama series
- Growing Up (American TV series), a 2022 documentary series on Disney+
- "Growing Up", an episode of The New Casper Cartoon Show

== See also ==
- Grow Up (disambiguation)
