= Mairéad Byrne =

Irish poet

Mairéad Byrne, born in Dublin, is an Irish poet who immigrated to the United States in 1994. Author of five poetry collections, and other works, she is a professor of poetry and poetics at Rhode Island School of Design.

== Education ==
Byrne earned a Bachelor of Arts in English Language & Literature from University College Dublin in 1977. She was awarded a Higher Diploma in Education from Trinity College Dublin in 1994, before earning a Master of Arts in Literature and Creative Writing (in 1996) and a Phd in Theory & Cultural Studies (in 2001), both from Purdue University.

== Poetry and other works ==
Byrne's poetry collections include You Have to Laugh: New and Selected Poems (Barrow Street 2013), The Best of (What's Left of) Heaven (Publishing Genius 2010), Talk Poetry (Miami University Press 2007), SOS Poetry (/Ubu Editions 2007), and Nelson & The Huruburu Bird (Wild Honey Press 2003); and the chapbooks State House Calendar (Dusie Kollektiv/ Watersign Press 2009), An Educated Heart (Palm Press 2005), Kalends (Belladonna 2005), Vivas (Wild Honey Press 2005), and The Pillar (Wild Honey Press 2000).

In the Cambridge Companion to Twentieth Century British and Irish Women's Poetry (2011), Lee Jenkins situates Byrne's poetics "in the global circuitry of diaspora, migration, and the information superhighway," identifying as a significant accomplishment that "she refuses to choose between formal innovation and radical theme," fusing commitments to both social justice and linguistic innovation. In an interview with Sina Queyras Byrne said, "I consider my work firmly in the tradition of Irish comic literature, both in early Irish and 20th century prose, especially Beckett and Flann O’Brien."

Books in collaboration with visual artists include Jennifer's Family (Schilt 2012), Michael Mulcahy (Gandon Editions 1995), Eithne Jordan (Gandon Editions 1994), and Joyce-A Clew (Bluett & Co., 1982). Byrne is also the author of two plays, The Golden Hair (Project Arts Centre Dublin 1982), and Safe Home (Project Arts Centre 1985), both of which received production grants from the Arts Council of Ireland / An Chomhairle Ealaíon. She was a freelance journalist in Ireland (1978–1986), writing features and reviews for all major magazines and daily newspapers, including In Dublin magazine, the Irish Times, and Raidió Teilifís Éireann; and The Village Voice and Provincetown Advocate in the United States (1987–1988).
