= Out of the Cool =

Studio album by The Gil Evans Orchestra
- Released: February 1961
- Recorded: November 18 & 30, December 10 & 15, 1960
- Studio: Van Gelder Studio; Englewood Cliffs, New Jersey
- Genre: Jazz; progressive big band
- Length: 44:06
- Label: Impulse! A-4
- Producer: Creed Taylor

The Gil Evans Orchestra chronology
Great Jazz Standards (1959)	Out of the Cool (1961)	Into the Hot (1962)

Out of the Cool is a jazz album by The Gil Evans Orchestra, recorded in 1960 and released on the Impulse! label the following year. The album was one of Impulse!'s first four albums, released together, and featured a gatefold design and high production values.

== Background ==
Gil Evans recorded the album a short time after completing a six-week job at the Jazz Gallery club in New York City; the personnel was largely the same, with Elvin Jones being added.

== Music ==
The first track, "La Nevada", was also recorded by Evans less than two years earlier for the album Great Jazz Standards; the version for Out of the Cool is given a consistent rhythmic structure by Elvin Jones playing shakers, giving the rest of the band greater freedom and leading to a less boppish version than the earlier recording. "Where Flamingos Fly" has a melody stated by trombonist Jimmy Knepper, and uses an earlier Evans arrangement done for vocalist Helen Merrill The music on this album was part of a move by Evans towards greater freedom in his compositions and arrangements, this "new work integrated the written and improvised, at times allowing the balance to shift imperceptibly".

== Reception ==
Professional ratings
Review scores
Source	Rating
Allmusic	4/5 stars
The Rolling Stone Jazz Record Guide	5/5 stars
Encyclopedia of Popular Music	5/5 stars
The Penguin Guide to Jazz Recordings	4/4 stars

The Penguin Guide to Jazz selected this album as part of its suggested "Core Collection", calling it "Evans' masterpiece under his own name and one of the best examples of jazz orchestration since the early Ellington bands". After the album was re-issued in 2021 as part of Impulse!'s sixtieth anniversary celebrations, it entered the Billboard Jazz Albums Chart at No. 11.

== Track listing ==
1. "La Nevada" (Gil Evans) – 15:38
2. "Where Flamingos Fly" (Elthea Peale, Harold Courlander, John Benson Brooks) – 5:14
3. "Bilbao Song" (Bertolt Brecht, Kurt Weill) – 4:13
4. "Stratusphunk" (George Russell) – 8:04
5. "Sunken Treasure" (Evans) – 4:16
6. "Sister Sadie" (Horace Silver) – 6:57 (CD bonus track, not on original LP)

Tracks 2, 4 and 5 recorded on November 18 and 30, 1960; the remainder on December 10 and 15, 1960.

== Personnel ==
- Gil Evans – piano
- Johnny Coles – trumpet (soloist)
- Phil Sunkel – trumpet
- Keg Johnson – trombone
- Jimmy Knepper – trombone
- Tony Studd – bass trombone (soloist)
- Bill Barber – tuba
- Ray Beckenstein – alto saxophone, flute, piccolo
- Eddie Caine – alto saxophone, flute, piccolo
- Budd Johnson – tenor saxophone, soprano saxophone (soloist)
- Bob Tricarico – flute, piccolo, bassoon
- Ray Crawford – guitar (soloist)
- Ron Carter – bass (soloist)
- Elvin Jones – drums, percussion
- Charlie Persip – drums
