= Rhythm A Ning (album) =

Studio album by Gil Evans / Laurent Cugny
- Released: 1988
- Recorded: November 2–3 & 26, 1987
- Venue: Paris
- Studio: Studio Acousti
- Genre: Jazz
- Length: 54:19
- Label: EmArcy 836 401-2
- Producer: Laurent Cugny

Gil Evans chronology
Paris Blues (1988)	Rhythm A Ning (1988)	Golden Hair (1989)

Rhythm A Ning is an album by jazz composer, arranger, conductor and keyboardist Gil Evans, recorded in 1987 and performed by Evans with Laurent Cugny's Big Band Lumiere.

== Reception ==
The AllMusic review by Scott Yanow awarded the album three stars, stating "This is a very interesting recording. Aging arranger/pianist Gil Evans agreed after much persuasion to come to Paris and play his music at a few concerts with Laurent Cugny's Orchestra. After only one rehearsal, the first event took place, and it gratified Evans to realize that the young French musicians were not only excellent players but big Gil Evans fans... they did an excellent job of bringing Gil Evans's music to life".

Professional ratings
Review scores
Source	Rating
Allmusic	3/5 stars

== Track listing ==
All compositions by Gil Evans except as indicated

1. "Rhythm-a-Ning" (Thelonious Monk) - 3:32
2. "London" - 15:18
3. "Stone Free" (Jimi Hendrix) - 10:41
4. "Charles Mingus's Sound of Love" (Laurent Cugny) - 9:59
5. "La Nevada" - 14:49
- Recorded at Studio Acousti in Paris on November 2 (track 4), November 3 (tracks 2 & 5) & November 26 (tracks 1 & 3), 1987

== Personnel ==
- Gil Evans - piano, electric piano, arranger, conductor
- Laurent Cugny - keyboards, arranger, conductor
- Christian Martinez, Stéphane Belmondo, François Chassagnite - trumpet
- Denis Barbier - flute
- Bobby Rangell - alto saxophone, soprano saxophone
- Pierre-Olivier Govin - alto saxophone
- Andy Sheppard, Charles Schneider - tenor saxophone
- Bernard François - French horn
- Gilles Salommez - trombone
- Philippe Legris - tuba
- Manuel Rocheman - piano
- Benoît de Mesmay - keyboards
- Lionel Benhamou - guitar
- Dominique Di Piazza - bass guitar
- Stéphane Huchard - drums
- Xavier Desandre, Marilyn Mazur - percussion
