= New Bottle Old Wine =

Studio album by Gil Evans
- Released: October 1958
- Recorded: April 9 and May 26, 1958
- Genre: Jazz
- Label: World Pacific
- Producer: George Avakian

Gil Evans chronology
Gil Evans & Ten (1958)	New Bottle Old Wine (1958)	Great Jazz Standards (1959)

New Bottle Old Wine is an album by jazz composer, arranger, conductor and pianist Gil Evans recorded in 1958 by Evans with an orchestra. The album is a suite of songs written by and/or associated with major jazz musicians and composers, in original arrangements by Gil Evans (conceptually similar to several albums Evans made with Miles Davis, including Miles Ahead, Porgy and Bess, and Sketches of Spain). Cannonball Adderley (Davis' alto saxophone player at the time) is featured as the main soloist. The orchestra also featured a number of important players including Bill Barber, Frank Rehak, Johnny Coles, Art Blakey, and Paul Chambers (Davis' bassist at the time).

== Reception ==
The Allmusic review by Scott Yanow awarded the album 4½ stars and states "This is near-classic music that showed that Gil Evans did not need Miles Davis as a soloist to inspire him to greatness" and The Penguin Guide to Jazz described the album as "one of [Adderley's] finest hours".

Professional ratings
Review scores
Source	Rating
Allmusic	4.5/5 stars

== Track listing ==
1. "St. Louis Blues" (W. C. Handy) - 5:26
2. "King Porter Stomp" (Jelly Roll Morton) - 3:19
3. "Willow Tree" (Fats Waller, Andy Razaf) - 4:40
4. "Struttin' With Some Barbeque" (Lil Armstrong) - 4:34
5. "Lester Leaps In" (Lester Young) - 4:17
6. "'Round Midnight" (Thelonious Monk) - 4:08
7. "Manteca!" (Dizzy Gillespie, Gil Fuller, Babs Gonzales) - 5:18
8. "Bird Feathers" (Charlie Parker) - 6:57

- Recorded in New York City on April 9 (tracks 1,2,5 & 6), May 2 (track 3), 21 (track 4), and 26 (tracks 7 & 8), 1958

== Personnel ==
- Gil Evans - piano, arranger, conductor
- Cannonball Adderley - alto saxophone (soloist)
- Johnny Coles, Louis Mucci, Ernie Royal (tracks 1–3, 5 & 6), Clyde Reasinger (tracks 4, 7 & 8) - trumpet
- Joe Bennett, Frank Rehak, Tom Mitchell - trombone
- Julius Watkins - french horn
- Harvey Phillips (tracks 1, 2, 5 & 6), Bill Barber (tracks 3, 4, 7 & 8) - tuba
- Jerry Sanfino (tracks 1, 2, 5 & 6), Phil Bodner (tracks 3, 4, 7 & 8) - reeds
- Chuck Wayne - guitar
- Paul Chambers - bass
- Philly Joe Jones (track 3), Art Blakey (tracks 1, 2 & 4–8) - drums
