= Keckler =

Keckler is a surname. Notable people with the surname include:

- Heather Keckler (fl. 1980s–2000s), American beauty pageant contestant and dancer
- Joseph Keckler, American singer, musician, performing artist, and writer
- Luis María Kreckler (born 1954), Argentine diplomat
- Stephen W. Keckler, American computer scientist
- W. B. Keckler (born 1966), American poet
