= Stephanie Barber =

American poet

Stephanie Barber is an American artist. An experimental filmmaker, video artist and writer, her films include the 2013 feature DAREDEVILS, catalog, dogs, total power:dead dead dead, shipfilm "dwarfs the sea" "the inversion, transcription, evening track and attractor", "flower, the boy, the librarian", "BUST CHANCE", "the visit and the play" among others.

== Life ==
Born in Riverhead, New York, she currently resides in Philadelphia. She is the granddaughter of American jazz tubist Bill Barber and was herself a member of the influential Milwaukee music/performance group XKS. She is currently Department Head, Associate Professor, Film & Digital Cinema at Moore College and Resident Artist in the multidisciplinary MFA program the Mt. Royal School of Interdisciplinary Art at MICA in Baltimore, MD.

== Films ==
ArtForum wrote "Though extremely varied, the films of Stephanie Barber engage universal themes—time, death, memory, forgetting, frustration." and CinemaScope Magazine wrote "Perhaps the only rule of Stephanie Barber’s otherwise unruly art is that words not be taken for granted."

She has had solo exhibitions of her film work at The Museum of Modern Art, The National Gallery of Art, The San Francisco Cinematheque, Anthology Film Archives, Light Industry and other museums, galleries and universities. Many of her 16mm films are distributed by Canyon Cinema and her videos are distributed by Video Data Bank

She has acted in David Robbins' The Ice Cream Social, Zero TVs Milwaukee Show, the feature film Hamlet A.D.D., and Jennifer Montgomery's Threads of Belonging.

== Writing ==
FOR A LAWN POEM Publishing Genius Apr 8, 2008

these here separated to see how they standing alone or the soundtrack to six films by stephanie barber Publishing Genius 2008 (reprinted 2010)

Night Moves Publishing Genius 2013 is a book edited from comments on the YouTube video for Bob Seger's Night Moves.

Barber writes a haiku everyday and posts it on Facebook. In 2019 Ctrl+P published a collection of the first 365 haiku in "Status Update: Vol 1".

Her 2021 full-length play Trial in the Woods was published by Plays Inverse, now an imprint of 53rd State Press.
