= Great Jazz Standards =

Studio album by Gil Evans
- Released: September 1959
- Recorded: Early 1959; New York City
- Genre: Jazz
- Label: World Pacific
- Producer: Richard Bock

Gil Evans chronology
New Bottle Old Wine (1958)	Great Jazz Standards (1959)	Out of the Cool (1961)

Great Jazz Standards is an album by jazz composer, arranger, conductor and pianist Gil Evans recorded in 1959 by Evans with an orchestra featuring Johnny Coles, Steve Lacy, Curtis Fuller, Jimmy Cleveland, Budd Johnson, Ray Crawford, and Elvin Jones.

== Reception ==
The Allmusic review by Scott Yanow awarded the album 4 stars calling it "Highly recommended".

Professional ratings
Review scores
Source	Rating
Allmusic	4/5 stars

== Track listing ==
1. "Davenport Blues" (Bix Beiderbecke) - 4:26
2. "Straight, No Chaser" (Thelonious Monk) - 6:19
3. "Ballad of the Sad Young Men" (Fran Landesman, Tommy Wolf) - 4:00
4. "Joy Spring" (Clifford Brown) - 2:48
5. "Django" (John Lewis) - 8:06
6. "Chant of the Weed" (Don Redman) - 4:25
7. "La Nevada" [a.k.a. "Theme"] (Gil Evans) - 6:17

Recorded on February 5, 1959 (tracks 3, 4, 6 & 7) and early 1959 (tracks 1, 2 & 5)

== Personnel ==
- Gil Evans - piano, arranger, conductor
- Steve Lacy - soprano saxophone
- Bill Barber - tuba
- Johnny Coles, Louis Mucci, Allen Smith (tracks 1–2, 5) - trumpet
- Curtis Fuller, Bill Elton, Dick Lieb (tracks 1–2, 5) - trombone
- Bob Northern (tracks 1–2, 5) - French horn
- Al Block (tracks 1–2, 5) - reeds
- Chuck Wayne (tracks 1–2, 5) - guitar
- Dick Carter (tracks 1–2, 5) - bass
- Denis Charles (tracks 1–2, 5) - drums
- Danny Stiles (tracks 3–4, 6–7) - trumpet
- Jimmy Cleveland, Rod Levitt (tracks 3–4, 6–7) - trombone
- Earl Chapin (tracks 3–4, 6–7) - French horn
- Ed Caine (tracks 3–4, 6–7) - reeds
- Ray Crawford (tracks 3–4, 6–7) - guitar
- Tommy Potter (tracks 3–4, 6–7) - bass
- Elvin Jones (tracks 3–4, 6–7) - drums
- Budd Johnson - clarinet, tenor saxophone (tracks 3–4, 6–7)
