= Makiko Hirabayashi =

Japanese jazz pianist based in Denmark

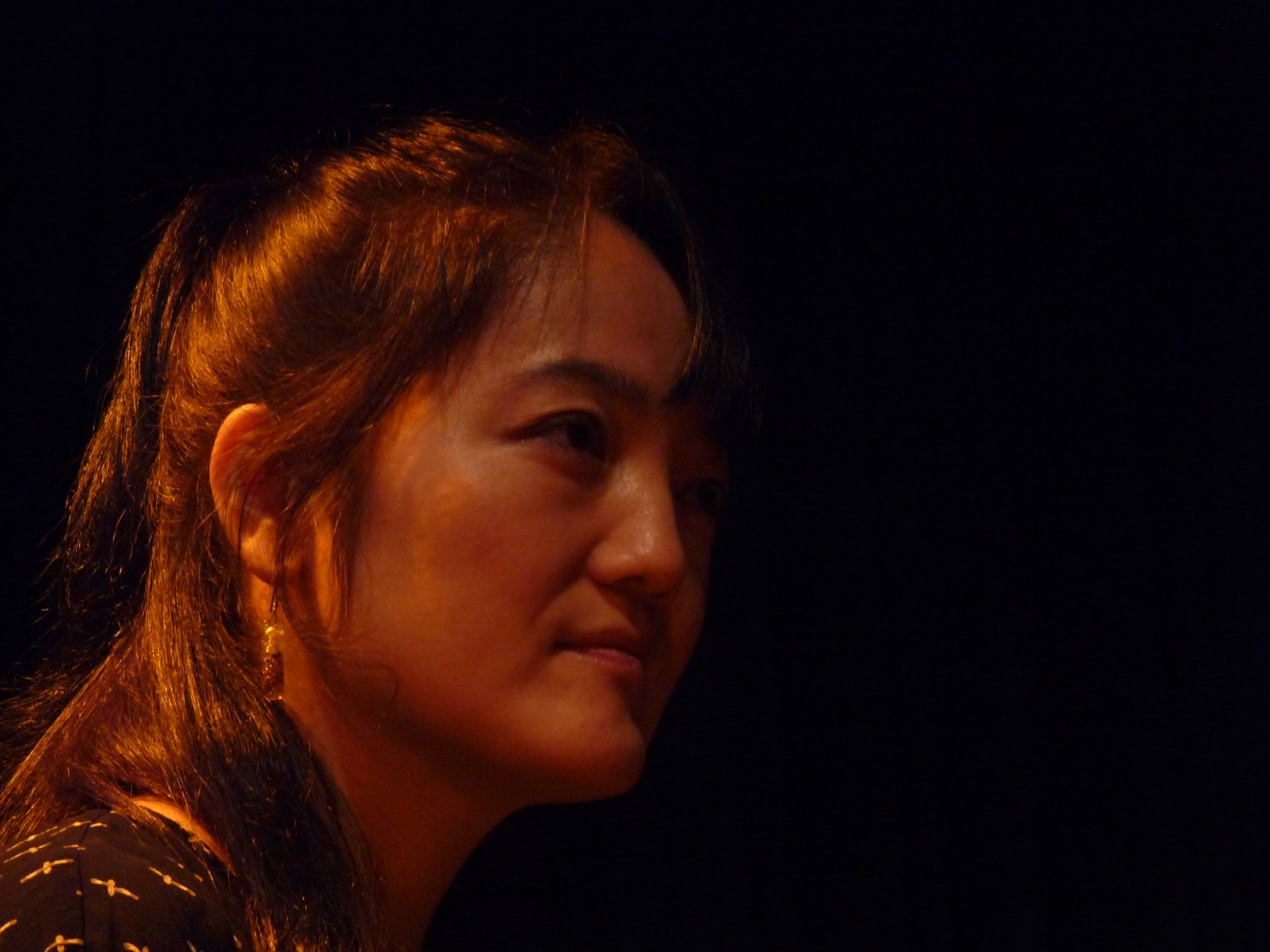
Makiko Hirabayashi

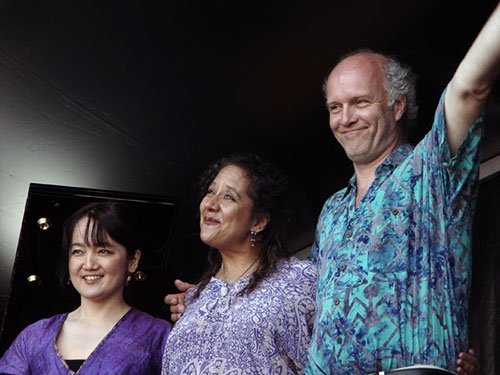
Makiko Hirabayashi Trio, Marilyn Mazur (d), Klavs Hovman (b)

Makiko Hirabayashi (born 1966) is a Japanese jazz pianist based in Denmark. She started to play the piano at the age of four, and subsequently violin at nine. As a teenager, she became interested in composing film music and won a scholarship to Berklee College of Music in Boston, where she became more involved with jazz and improvisation. After graduation, she moved to Copenhagen to start her career as a pianist and composer.

Her compositions are inspired by elements from classical music, jazz, music from the Far East and the Nordic moods.

== Discography ==
- Makiko (Enja 2006) Makiko Hirabayashi Trio - Makiko Hirabayashi (p), Klavs Hovman (b), Marilyn Mazur (dr/perc/voc)
- Grey to Blue (Stunt 2008) Grey To Blue - Mariane Bitran (fl), Makiko Hirabayashi (p), Bob Rockwell (sax), Erik Olevik (b), Morten Lund (dr)
- Hide and Seek (Enja 2009) Makiko Hirabayashi Trio - Makiko Hirabayashi (p), Klavs Hovman (b), Marilyn Mazur (dr/perc/voc)
- Binocular (Stunt 2010) Binocular - Flemming Agerskov (tpt/flg), Makiko Hirabayashi (p), Francesco Cali (acc)
- Surely (Enja 2013) Makiko Hirabayashi Trio - Makiko Hirabayashi (p), Klavs Hovman (b), Marilyn Mazur (dr/perc/voc)
- Gong (Gateway 2016) Bob Rockwell (sax), Makiko Hirabayashi (p)
- Where The Sea Breaks (Enja/Yellowbird 2018) - Jakob Buchanan (flg), Makiko Hirabayashi (p), Klavs Hovman (b), Marilyn Mazur (dr/perc/voc)
- Weavers (Enja/Yellowbird 2021) - Fredrik Lundin (sax), Makiko Hirabayashi (p), Thommy Andersson (b), Bjørn Heebøll (d)
- Meteora (Enja 2023) - Makiko Hirabayashi Trio - Makiko Hirabayashi (p), Klavs Hovman (b), Marilyn Mazur (dr/perc)
- Gifts (Enja 2025) - Makiko Hirabayashi Weavers — Makiko Hirabayashi (p); Fredrik Lundin (sax); Bjorn Heebol (dr); Thommy Andersson (b)
