= Stephen Dixon Award =

American annual literary award

The McSweeney's Stephen Dixon Award for Short Fiction, established in 2024, is an American literary award presented for short fiction that is experimental in form. The award is sponsored by McSweeney's. The inaugural winner received a $1,750 cash prize, while the runner-up received a $750 cash prize. In 2026, the winner received a $2,000 cash prize.

The award honors the late American author Stephen Dixon (1936–2019).

== Winners and finalists ==
Year	Author	Title	Result	Ref.
2023	Kristina Ten	"Adjective"	Winner	
2023	Maz Do	"When the Moths Came"	Runner-Up	
2024	Hedgie Choi	"Gretel"	Winner	
2025	Akhim Alexis	"My Son's Name is Not Cassava"	Winner	
2025	Colin Heasley	"Composure"	Runner-Up	
2025	Olga Lexell	"Ashes"	Runner-Up	
2026	Zhenglong Yang	"The Bluest Ash"	Winner	
