= Prakash Kona =

Indian writer (born 1967)

Prakash Kona Reddy
- Born: July 14, 1967 (age 59); Hyderabad, India
- Education: University of Mississippi; University of Hyderabad; Osmania University
- Writing career
- Genres: Marxism, a history of Anarchism, Avant-garde poetry, Third World Resistance writing, polemical cinema
- Notable work: Conjurer of nights
- Website: efluniversity.ac.in/view_profile.php?e=II0104

Prakash Kona Reddy (born 1967) is an Indian novelist, essayist, poet and theorist who lives in Hyderabad, India. He was a professor of English literature at The English and Foreign Languages University (Hyderabad campus).

He writes in English, and is the author of nine books to date.

== Bibliography ==
- Conjurer of Nights [Poetry; 2012 Waterloo Press]
- Nunc Stans [Creative Non-fiction: 2009, CROSSING CHAOS enigmatic ink, Ontario, Canada]
- How I Invented Myself as 'Prakash Kona' [Poetry; 2008 Monsoon Editions, Calicut, India]
- Words on Lips of a Stranger (as Kona Prakash Reddy) [Poetry; 2005, Writers Workshop Calcutta]
- Pearls of an Unstrung Necklace [Fiction: 2005, Fugue State Press, New York]
- Literary Criticism: A Study of Pluralism (Wittgenstein, Chomsky and Derrida) [Theory; 2004, Wisdom House Publications, Leeds, England]
- Streets that Smell of Dying Roses[Fiction: 2003, Fugue State Press, New York; also Yeti Books, Calicut, India]
- You and Other Poems (as Kona Prakash Reddy) [Poetry; 1997, Writers Workshop Calcutta]
- Poems for Her (as Kona Prakash Reddy) [Poetry; 1992, Writers Workshop Calcutta]

Other works, including essays and fictional vignettes, are published widely on the Internet.

In August 2010 Kona contributed to an eBook collection of political poems entitled Emergency Verse - Poetry in Defence of the Welfare State edited by Alan Morrison.
