= Gil Evans =

Canadian-American jazz pianist (1912–1988)

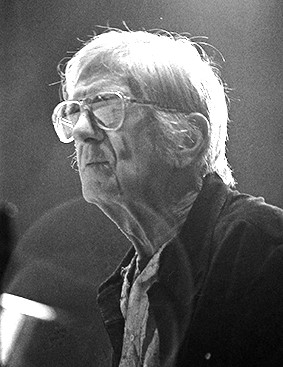
- Evans in 1978

Background information
- Born: Gilmore Ian Ernest Green; May 13, 1912; Toronto, Ontario, Canada
- Died: March 20, 1988 (aged 75) Cuernavaca, Mexico
- Genres: Jazz; cool jazz; modal jazz; free jazz; fusion
- Occupations: Musician; composer; arranger; bandleader
- Instrument: Piano
- Years active: 1933–1988
- Labels: Prestige; World Pacific; Impulse!; RCA, Verve; Columbia; King; EmArcy
- Formerly of: Claude Thornhill Orchestra; Gil Evans Orchestra
- Website: gilevans.com

Ian Ernest Gilmore Evans (né Green; May 13, 1912 – March 20, 1988) was a Canadian–American jazz pianist, arranger, composer and bandleader. He is widely recognized as one of the greatest orchestrators in jazz, playing an important role in the development of cool jazz, modal jazz, free jazz, and jazz fusion. He is best known for his acclaimed collaborations with Miles Davis.

== Early life ==
Gil Evans was born in Toronto, Canada, on May 13, 1912, to Margaret Julia McConnachy. Little is known about Evans's biological father, although a family friend said that he was a doctor who died before Evans was born. Originally named Gilmore Ian Ernest Green, Evans took the last name of his step-father, John Evans, a miner. The family moved frequently, living in Saskatchewan, British Columbia, Washington, Idaho, Montana, and Oregon, migrating to wherever Evans's father could find work. Eventually, the family ended up in California, first in Berkeley, where Evans attended the ninth and tenth grades, then in Stockton, where he attended Stockton High School, graduating in 1930. During this time, Evans's father took a job with the Western Pacific Railroad, and Evans began living with friends, later renting a room in a boarding house. After graduating, Evans attended the College of the Pacific in Stockton, where he founded his first jazz big band, Gil Evans & His Orchestra, in 1933, but then transferred to Modesto Junior College. After a year in Modesto, Evans left and moved back to Stockton.

Evans became interested in music at an early age, listening to Duke Ellington, Louis Armstrong, and Fletcher Henderson on the radio and on records. He studied the piano and began learning how to arrange music, and started picking up jobs with local musicians. While in college, he founded his first band, which performed his arrangements, and which became the house band at the Rendezvous Ballroom in Balboa Beach, California, in 1935. The band toured the Pacific Northwest in 1937 and eventually settled in Hollywood, where they regularly performed on Bob Hope's radio show. Evans's arrangements from this time showed the influence of classical music, and included instruments such as French horns, flutes, and tubas. In 1939, Claude Thornhill was hired for Hope's show, and he became a major influence on Evans.

Evans remained a Canadian citizen until he entered the US Army during the second World War. After 1946, he lived and worked primarily in New York City, living for many years at Westbeth Artists Community.

== Career ==
Between 1941 and 1948, Evans worked as an arranger for the Claude Thornhill Orchestra. Even then, early in his career, his arrangements were such a challenge to musicians that bassist Bill Crow recalled that bandleader Thornhill would bring out Evans's arrangements "when he wanted to punish the band." Evans's modest basement apartment behind a New York City Chinese laundry soon became a meeting place for musicians looking to develop new musical styles outside of the dominant bebop style of the day. Those present included the leading bebop performer, Charlie Parker, as well as Gerry Mulligan and John Carisi.

In 1948, Evans, with Miles Davis, Mulligan, and others, collaborated on a band book for a nonet. These ensembles, larger than the trio-to-quintet combos, but smaller than big bands which were on the brink of economic unviability, allowed arrangers to have a larger palette of colors by using French horns and tuba. Claude Thornhill had employed hornist John Graas in 1942, and composer-arranger Bob Graettinger had scored for horns and tubas with the Stan Kenton orchestra, but the "Kenton sound" was in the context of a dense orchestral wall of sound that Evans avoided. The Miles Davis-led group was booked for a week at the Royal Roost as an intermission group on the bill with the Count Basie Orchestra. Capitol Records recorded 12 numbers by the nonet at three sessions in 1949 and 1950. These recordings were reissued on a 1957 Miles Davis LP titled Birth of the Cool.

Later, while Davis was under contract with Columbia Records, producer George Avakian suggested that Davis could work with any of several arrangers. Davis immediately chose Evans. The three albums that resulted from the collaboration are Miles Ahead (1957), Porgy and Bess (1958), and Sketches of Spain (1960). Another collaboration from this period, Quiet Nights (1962) was issued later, against the wishes of Davis, who broke with his then-producer Teo Macero for a time as a result. Although these four records were marketed primarily under Davis's name (and credited to Miles Davis with Orchestra Under the Direction of Gil Evans), Evans's contribution was as important as Davis's. Their work coupled Evans's classic big band jazz stylings and arrangements with Davis's solo playing. Evans also contributed behind the scenes to Davis's classic quintet albums of the 1960s.

The demands of the score for Porgy and Bess were legendary, from the very first note for the lead trumpet. The limited time allotted for rehearsals revealed that the ability to read such a challenging score was not consistent among jazz musicians, and there are many audible errors. Yet the recording is now regarded by many as one of the greatest reinterpretations of Gershwin's music in any musical style, because Evans and Davis were each devoted to going outside the "mainstream" of commercial expectations for jazz musicians. Evans was a great influence on Davis's interest in "non-jazz" music, especially orchestral music. Unfortunately, Evans's orchestral scores from the Porgy and Bess sessions were later found to be incomplete (or simply lost), and Quincy Jones and Gil Goldstein attempted to reconstruct these for Miles Davis's final 1991 concerts at Montreux, recorded as Miles & Quincy Live at Montreux. Davis had relented after years of refusing to revisit this material, but he was clearly ill, recovering from pneumonia, and trumpeter Wallace Roney, who was mentored by Davis, covered many of the challenging passages. Davis died before the release of the album.

From 1957 onwards, Evans recorded albums under his own name. Tubist Bill Barber and trumpeter Louis Mucci from Thornhill's band were both stalwarts in Evans's early ensembles, with Mucci finding a spot on nearly every pre-1980s Evans recording. Among the featured soloists on these records were Lee Konitz, Jimmy Cleveland, Steve Lacy, Johnny Coles and Cannonball Adderley. In 1965, he arranged the big band tracks on Kenny Burrell's Guitar Forms album.

Evans was influenced by Spanish composers Manuel de Falla and Joaquín Rodrigo, and by other Latin and Brazilian music, as well as by German expatriate Kurt Weill. His arrangements of pieces already well known to some listeners from their original cabaret, concert hall or Broadway stage arrangements, revealed aspects of the music in a wholly original way. Sometimes in an unexpected contrast to the original atmosphere of the piece, and sometimes taking a dark ballad such as Weill's "Barbara Song" into an even darker place.

The personnel list for The Individualism of Gil Evans (1964), not only features Bill Barber and hornists James Buffington and Julius Watkins (along with two others), but each section features the cream of the younger (some more classically trained) musicians who were making their names in jazz. The presence of four of the most acclaimed young bassists (Richard Davis, Paul Chambers, Ron Carter, and Ben Tucker) along with veteran Milt Hinton would ordinarily indicate that each is used individually for separate tracks, but Evans's scores usually required at least two bassists on any given track, some playing arco (with the bow) and some pizzicato (plucking with fingers, the standard jazz method). These arrangements frequently featured greatly slowed-down tempos with polyrhythmic percussion and no prevailing "beat". To his by-now standard French horns and tuba, Evans's scores added alto and bass flutes, double reeds, and harp; orchestral instruments not associated with "swing" bands, providing a larger palette of orchestral colors, and allowing him to attain the ethereal quality heard in his arrangements during his Thornhill days. He frequently wrote a part for the tenor violin of Harry Lookofsky. Yet, this album featured an orchestral arrangement of "Spoonful" by bluesman Willie Dixon, an early indication of Evans's breadth and a hint of things to come.

In 1966, he recorded an album with Brazilian singer Astrud Gilberto, Look to the Rainbow. He was discouraged by the commercial direction Verve Records was taking with the Gilberto sessions, and he went into a period of hiatus.

During this period while he was somewhat depressed about the commercial and logistical difficulties of his previous scoring requirements, his wife suggested that he listen to the guitarist Jimi Hendrix. Evans developed a particular interest in the work of the rock guitarist. Evans gradually built another orchestra in the 1970s, with none of the coloration instruments from his past arrangements. Working in the free jazz and jazz-rock idioms, he gained a new generation of admirers. These ensembles, rarely more than fifteen and frequently smaller, allowed him to make more contributions on keyboards, and with the development of truly portable synthesizers, he began using these to provide additional color. Hendrix's 1970 death precluded a scheduled meeting with Evans to discuss having Hendrix collaborate with a big band led by Evans.

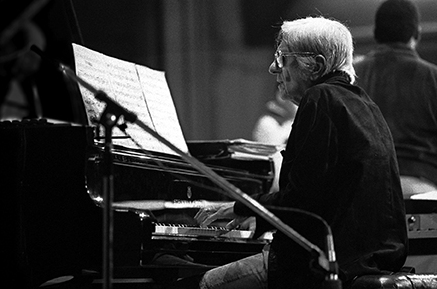
Gil Evans (1978)

In 1974, he released an album of his, and other band members', arrangements of music by Hendrix with guitarists John Abercrombie and Ryo Kawasaki. From then on Evans's ensembles featured electric instruments, i.e. guitars, basses, and synthesizers including a collaboration with bassist Jaco Pastorius Gil Evans & Jaco Pastorius – Live Under The Sky Tokyo '84. In contrast to his intricate scores for large ensembles, which required precision orchestral playing accompanying a single soloist, his later arrangements would feature more unison playing by the entire ensemble, such as on Hendrix's "Little Wing", with improvisational touches added throughout by the musicians. Live recordings demonstrate that some entire pieces were collaborative efforts, and Evans can be heard giving cues from the keyboard (behind the band) to guide the band. Before the 1970s, his keyboard playing was generally sparse on recordings but after the 1970s he took a more active role in the rhythm section of the band.

Where Flamingos Fly (recorded 1971, released 1981) demonstrated his ability to contract the most accomplished musicians, with veterans Coles, Harry Lookofsky, Richard Davis and Jimmy Knepper (who played the solo on the "Where Flamingos Fly" track on 1961's Out of the Cool) alongside young multi-instrumentalist Howard Johnson, synthesizer player Don Preston (at that time still a member of The Mothers of Invention), and Billy Harper.

In April 1983, the Gil Evans Orchestra was booked into the Sweet Basil Jazz Club (Greenwich Village, New York) by jazz producer and Sweet Basil owner Horst Liepolt. This turned out to be a regular Monday night engagement for Evans for nearly five years and also resulted in the release of a number of successful albums by Gil Evans and the Monday Night Orchestra. Evans's ensemble featured many of the top-call musicians in New York, many of whom were also in the NBC Saturday Night Live Band and there were many conflicts, so their "deputies" for the night might be other world-class musicians. Yet Evans was also known to let newcomers "sit in" occasionally. The band also performed arrangements by band members, current and past. Stalwarts in this ensemble were Lew Soloff, Alan Rubin, Marvin Peterson, Tom "Bones" Malone, George Adams, David Sanborn, Pete Levin, Hiram Bullock, Mark Egan, drummer Kenwood Dennard, saxophonist Bill Evans (no relation), and Gil Goldstein.

In 1987, Evans recorded a live album with Sting: Last Session – Live At Perugia Jazz Festival July 11, 1987, featuring the Monday Night Orchestra musicians, guest star Branford Marsalis and big band arrangements of songs by and with The Police and Jimi Hendrix. In the same spirit of introducing new talent in his bands, he collaborated with Maria Schneider with her as an apprentice arranger on this and other final projects. His final project was Nov. 3 & 26, 1987, his arrangements for the Laurent Cugny Big Band in Paris, on the recording "Golden Hair" on Emarcy/Polygram.

In 1996, Columbia Record released a box set which besides the masterpieces, featured outtakes and rarities of Miles Davis and Gil Evans.

=== Ryan Truesdell presents the Gil Evans Project ===
Ryan Truesdell (de) began the Gil Evans Project, which resulted in a 2012 CD entitled Centennial, featuring previously unrecorded compositions and arrangements. These were produced with the permission of the Gil Evans estate, who gave Truesdell access to these scores and materials. Miles Evans, Gil's son, also led the Gil Evans Orchestra for a centennial concert at New York's Highline Ballroom, featuring many of the musicians heard in the orchestra during Evans's lifetime.

== Film music ==
In 1986, Evans produced and arranged the soundtrack to the film of the Colin MacInnes book Absolute Beginners, thereby working with such contemporary artists as Sade Adu, Patsy Kensit's Eighth Wonder, the Style Council, Jerry Dammers, Smiley Culture, Edward Tudor-Pole, and David Bowie.

He also arranged the music for the 1986 Martin Scorsese film The Color of Money.

== Personal life ==
Evans first married Lillian Grace following the 1949 Birth of the Cool recording sessions. Very little is known about this marriage. In 1963, he married again. Evans was survived by his second wife, Anita (Cooper), and two children, Noah and Miles. His son Miles played trumpet in his Monday Night Orchestra.

Evans died at age 75 in Cuernavaca, Mexico, of peritonitis, contracting it shortly after prostate surgery and subsequent travel to Mexico to recover.

== Awards and honors ==
- In 1986, Evans was inducted into the DownBeat Jazz Hall of Fame.
- He was also inducted into the Canadian Music Hall of Fame in 1997.

=== Grammy Awards ===
Awarded as followings:

- 1960: Sketches of Spain (with Miles Davis, Best Jazz Composition of More Than Five Minutes Duration)
- 1988: Bud and Bird (with the Monday Night Orchestra, Best Jazz Instrumental Performance, Big Band)
- 1997: (Miles Davis & Gil Evans: The Complete Columbia Studio Recordings (Best Historical Album for the Compilation Producers and/or Mastering Engineers))
- 2012: "How About You" in Centennial - Newly Discovered Works of Gil Evans (with Gil Evans Project, Best Instrumental Arrangement)

==== Grammy Award nominations ====
- 1961: Out of the Cool (Best Jazz Performance Solo or Small Group)
- 1962: Miles Davis at Carnegie Hall (with Miles Davis, Best Jazz Performance Solo or Small Group (Instrumental))
- 1964: The Individualism of Gil Evans (Best Instrumental Jazz Performance – Small Group or Soloist)
- 1964: Quiet Nights (with Miles Davis, Best Instrumental Jazz Performance – Small Group or Soloist)
- 1965: Kenny Burrell's Guitar Forms (with Kenny Burrell, Best Instrumental Jazz Performance – Soloist or Small Group)
- 1965: "Greensleeves" in Kenny Burrell's Guitar Forms (Best Instrumental Arrangement)
- 1973: Svengali (Best Jazz Performance by a Group)
- 1983: Priestess (Best Jazz Instrumental Performance, Group)
- 2012: "Look to the Rainbow" in Centennial - Newly Discovered Works of Gil Evans (posthumously with Gil Evans Project & Luciana Souza, Best Instrumental Arrangement Accompanying Vocalist(s))

== Discography ==
=== As leader ===
- 1957 - Gil Evans & Ten (Prestige, 1958)
- 1958 - New Bottle Old Wine (World Pacific, 1958)
- 1959 - Great Jazz Standards (World Pacific, 1959)
- 1960 - Out of the Cool (Impulse!, 1961)
- 1961 - Into the Hot (Impulse!, 1962)
- 1963-64 - The Individualism of Gil Evans (Verve, 1964) - Reissued in 1988 on CD with new recordings
- 1964 - Previously Unreleased Recordings (Verve, 1974)
- 1969 - Gil Evans (Ampex, 1970) – also released as Blues in Orbit (Enja, 1980)
- 1971 - Where Flamingos Fly (Artists House, 1981)
- 1973 - Svengali (Atlantic, 1973)
- 1974 - The Gil Evans Orchestra Plays the Music of Jimi Hendrix (RCA Victor, 1974)
- 1974 - Montreux Jazz Festival '74 (Philips, 1975)
- 1975 - There Comes a Time (RCA, 1976)
- 1976 - Tokyo Concert 1976 (Studio Songs, 2010)
- 1977 - Priestess (Antilles, 1983)
- 1978 - Little Wing Live in Germany (Circle, 1978)
- 1978 - Parabola (Horo, 1979)
- 1978 - Gil Evans Live at the Royal Festival Hall London 1978 (RCA Victor, 1979)
- 1978 - The Rest of Gil Evans Live at The Royal Festival Hall London 1978 (Mole Jazz, 1981)
- 1978 - The British Orchestra (Mole Jazz, 1983)
- 1980 - Live at the Public Theater (New York 1980) Vol.1 (Trio, 1980), Vol.2 (Trio, 1981)
- 1981 - Lunar Eclypse (New Tone Records, 1992)
- 1985 - Live at Sweet Basil (Electric Bird, 1985)
- 1986 - Live at Sweet Basil Vol. 2 (Electric Bird, 1986)
- 1986 - Farewell (Electric Bird, 1988)
- 1986 - Absolute Beginners: The Original Motion Picture Soundtrack (EMI, 1986)
- 1986 - The Honey Man (New Tone Records, 1995)
- 1986 - Live at Fabrik Hamburg 1986 (NDR Kultur, ?)
- 1987 - Bud and Bird (Electric Bird, 1987)
- 1987 - Paris Blues with Steve Lacy (Owl, 1988)
- 1987 - Live at Umbria Jazz 87, Voll.1 & 2 (Egea, ?)
- 1987 - Rhythm A Ning with Laurent Cugny (EmArcy, 1988)
- 1987 - Golden Hair with Laurent Cugny (EmArcy, 1989)
- 1987 - 75th Birthday Concert (BBC Legends, 2001)

=== As co-leader or arranger ===
- 1942-47 Complete Instrumental Charts For Claude Thornhill (Masters of Jazz, ?)
- 1947-49 - Claude Thornhill Orchestra, The Real Birth of the Cool: Studio Recordings (Columbia CBS 1971)
- 1949-50 - Miles Davis, Birth of the Cool (Capitol, 1957)
- 1950-52 - Charlie Parker, Big Band (Clef, 1954)
- 1955.12 - Hal McKusick, The Jazz Workshop (RCA Victor, 1956)
- 1956 - Johnny Mathis, Johnny Mathis (Columbia, 1956)
- 1956 - Marcy Lutes, Debut (Decca, 1956)
- 1957.01 - Lucy Reed, This Is Lucy Reed (Fantasy, 1957)
- 1956-57 - Helen Merrill, Dream of You (EmArcy, 1957)
- 1957.05 - Miles Davis, Miles Ahead (Columbia, 1957)
- 1958 - Don Elliott Octet, Jamaica Jazz (ABC-Paramount, 1958)
- 1958 - Miles Davis, Porgy and Bess (Columbia, 1959)
- 1959-60 - Miles Davis, Sketches of Spain (Columbia, 1960)
- 1961- Miles Davis, Miles Davis at Carnegie Hall (Columbia, 1962)
- 1962-63 - Miles Davis, Quiet Nights (Columbia, 1963)
- 1964-65 - Kenny Burrell, Guitar Forms (Verve, 1965)
- 1965-66 - Astrud Gilberto, Look to the Rainbow (Verve, 1966)
- 1968 - Miles Davis, Filles de Kilimanjaro (Columbia, 1968) – without credits
- 1972 - Kimiko Kasai & Gil Evans, Satin Doll (CBS/Sony, 1972)
- 1972 - Masabumi Kikuchi, Masabumi Kikuchi with Gil Evans (Philips, 1972)
- 1980 - Lee Konitz & Gil Evans, Heroes (Verve, 1991)
- 1980 - Lee Konitz & Gil Evans, Anti-Heroes (Verve, 1991)
- 1982-83 - Miles Davis, Star People (Columbia, 1983)
- 1983 - Miles Davis, Decoy (Columbia, 1984) – only "That's Right"
- 1984 - Gil Evans & Jaco Pastorius – Live Under The Sky Tokyo '84 (Hi Hat, 2016)
- 1985 - Glen Hall & Gil Evans, The Mother of the Book (InRespect, 1994)
- 1985 - Lew Soloff, Hanalei Bay (Bellaphon, 1985)
- 1986 - Ornella Vanoni, Ornella &... Duetti, Trii, Quartetti (CGD, 1986)
- 1987 - Sting, ...Nothing Like the Sun (A&M, 1987)
- 1987 - Sting, Last Session_Live At Perugia Jazz Festival 11 July 1987 (Jazz Door, 1992)
- 1987 - Helen Merrill & Gil Evans, Collaboration (EmArcy, 1988)
- 1988 - James Senese, Alhambra (EMI, 1988)
- 1988 - Orchestre National de Jazz & Antoine Herve, O.N.J. 87 (Label Bleu, 1988)
- 1988 - Ray Russell, Why Not Now (Theta, 1988)

== Filmography ==
- 1960 - Miles Davis – The Cool Jazz Sound (2009)
- 1972 - Japan Tour ()
- 1976 - Live in Barcelona ()
- 1976 - Jazz jamboree ()
- 1976 - Live in Torino ()
- 1983 - RMS Live with Gil Evans at the Montreux Jazz Festival 1983 (Angel Air, 2004)
- 1984 - Jaco Pastorius Japan Select Live
- 1987 - Strange Fruit with Sting (2007)
- 1988 - Live at Sweet Basil January 11th 1988 2nd Set (Orchestra)
- ??? - Gil Evans and His Orchestra (V.I.E.W. Video) (2007)

== See also ==
- List of jazz arrangers
