= W. B. Keckler =

American poet and translator

- Born: 1966 (age 59–60); Harrisburg, Pennsylvania
- Known for: poetry

W. B. Keckler, (born 1966 Harrisburg, Pennsylvania), is an American poet and translator.

== Poetry ==
Keckler's poetry characteristically views nature as autonomous from the humanly-constructed world and attempts to chart the rhythms of this autonomy. Recent collections have seen the introduction of works produced in collaboration with artificial intelligence entities and conversations with artificial intelligence entities.

Keckler's poetry has appeared in numerous anthologies, including Isn't It Romantic: 100 Love Poems by Younger American Poets (Wave Books, NYC), In the Criminal's Cabinet (nth position, London) and poem, home: An Ars Poetica (Paper Kite Press, 2009).

== Awards ==
- 2002 National Poetry Series, for Sanskrit of the Body
- 1994-1995 Gertrude Stein Award in Innovative American Poetry, for "One Poem"
- 1997 Fellowship in Poetry from the National Endowment on the Arts

== Works ==
- "Snow Wok", Shampoo 17
- "Spring Poem," Coconut 14
- "Two Poems," Free Verse
- "Holding Holding" and other poems, Gut Cult
- Sanskrit of the Body (2002, ISBN 978-0-14-200303-9),
- Ants Dissolve in Moonlight (1995, ISBN 978-1-879193-04-8)
- You name it: poehms. Logodaedalus Press. 1998. ISBN 978-0-9651401-2-6.

=== Translations ===
- The Kingdom of Farfelu, With Paper Moons. Fugue State Press. 2005. ISBN 978-1-879193-13-0. - André Malraux's early works Royaume-Farfelu and Lunes en Papier
