= Laurent Cugny =

French musician

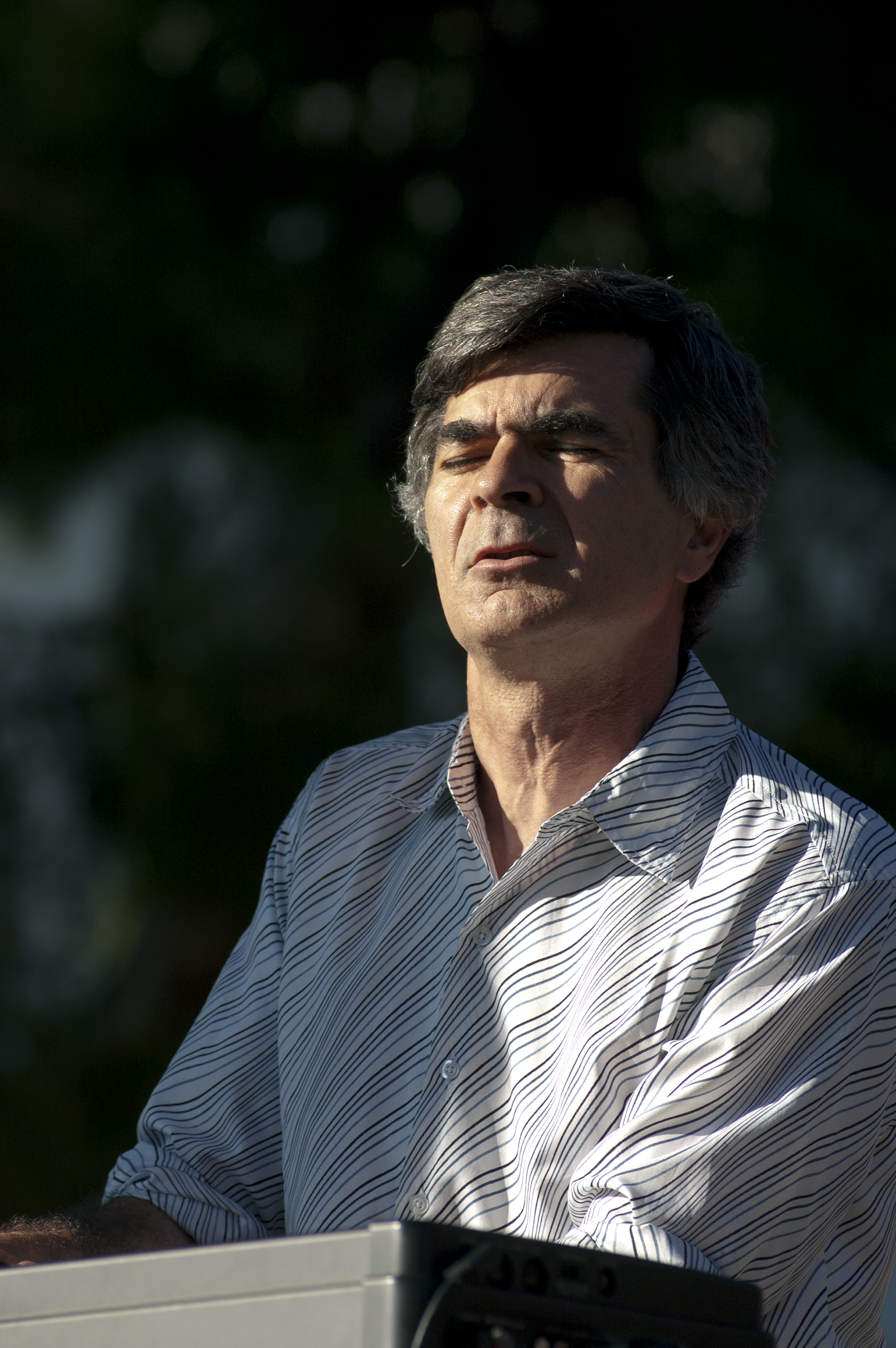

Background information
- Born: April 14, 1955 (age 70); La Garenne-Colombes
- Occupation: Musician
- Instrument: Piano

Laurent Cugny (born 14 April 1955 in La Garenne-Colombes) is a French jazz musician (pianist, bandleader, composer, and arranger), jazz critic, and musicologist. In 1987, he recorded two albums with his big band Lumière and Gil Evans.

== Awards ==
- Django d'Or as composer (2009)
- Django d'Or as leader of the Orchestre National de Jazz (1997)
- Prix Django Reinhardt (1989)

== Discography ==
With Gil Evans

- Rhythm A Ning (EmArcy, 1988)
- Golden Hair (EmArcy, 1989)

Laurent Cugny Big Band Lumière

- Dromesko (EmArcy, 1993)
