= Judith Skillman =

American poet

Judith Skillman

Judith Skillman (born 1954) is a contemporary northwest American poet and the author of over twenty collections of verse. She is the winner of many poetry awards, including the Eric Mathieu King Fund from the Academy of American Poets, and has received an Artist Trust Gap grant. Skillman is also a translator from the French, most notably of the poet Anne-Marie Derese.

She has had 26 poems published in the Journal of the American Medical Association (JAMA). In addition her work has appeared in Poetry, Shenandoah, The Southern Review, Prairie Schooner, Cimarron Review, and many other journals. Anthologies include Nasty Women Poets, Lost Horse Press, 2017, Cream City 50th Anniversary Anthology, and Raven Chronicles Take a Stand Against Hate.

Currently Skillman resides in Issaquah. She has dual citizenship with Canada. Skillman is also a painter; her work can be seen at Saatchi Art: https://www.saatchiart.com/account/artworks/823323

See www.judithskillman.com for additional links to publications and artwork.

In 2013 Skillman published a book on the creative and practical processes of writing poetry, Broken Lines - The Art & Craft of Poetry. It is targeted at poets who would like to put together a first or second manuscript of poetry.

== Books ==
- Oppression (Shanti Arts, 2026)
- Subterranean Address (Deerbrook Editions, 2023)
- A Landscaped Garden for the Addict (Shanti Arts, 2021)
- The Truth About Our American Births (Shanti Arts, 2022)
- Came Home to Winter (Deerbrook Editions, 2019
- Premise of Light (Tebot Bach), 2018)
- Kafka's Shadow (Deerbrook Editions, 2017)
- House of Burnt Offerings (Pleasure Boat Studio, 2015)
- Angles of Separation (Glass Lyre Press, 2014)
- The Phoenix: New & Selected Poems 2007 – 2013 (Dream Horse Press, 2013)
- Broken Lines - The Art & Craft of Poetry (Lummox Press, 2013)
- White Cypress (Červená Barva Press, 2011)
- The Never (Dream Horse Press, 2010)
- Prisoner of the Swifts (Ahadada Books, 2007)
- Heat Lightning; Selected Poems (Silverfish Review Press, 2006).
- Coppelia; Certain Digressions (David Robert, 2006).
- Opalescence (David Robert, 2005).
- Latticework (David Robert, 2004).
- Circe's Island (Silverfish Review Press, 2003).
- Sweetbrier (Blue Begonia, 2001).
- Red Town (Silverfish Review Press, 2001).
- Storm (Blue Begonia, 1998).
- Beethoven and the Birds (Blue Begonia, 1996).
- Worship of the Visible Spectrum (Breitenbush Books, 1986).
