= Grow Up (book) =

2011 novel by Ben Brooks

- Author: Ben Brooks
- Language: English
- Publisher: Canongate Books
- Publication date: July 1, 2011
- Media type: Print (Paperback)
- Pages: 240
- ISBN: 978-0857861870
- OCLC: 165400713

Grow Up is a novel by author Ben Brooks.

The novel was published in 2011 by Canongate Books Ltd. It centres on Jasper, a teenager who is in his final year of compulsory education and, like his friends, engages in drugs, sex and drink in his spare time.

The novel received mixed reviews. Anna Winter of The Observer wrote "Ben Brooks's coming-of-age novel has sex and drugs – but not a lot else" while a review on Scotsman.com said that "Grow Up is a sharp and witty exploration of adolescent life in modern Britain". "Brooks's novel is achingly self-reflexive" says reviewer Jane Housham of The Guardian. The reviewer for The Independent mentions a "horrible tendency to over-egg his similes and metaphors".
