= Ben Brooks (novelist) =

English novelist (born 1992)

- Born: April 1992 (age 34); Gloucestershire, England
- Occupation: Writer
- Writing career
- Notable work: Grow Up (2011)

Ben Brooks (Gloucestershire, 6 April 1992) is a British novelist, author of books for adults and children, including his latest novel The Greatest Possible Good (July 2025), Grow Up, and the million-copy bestselling series Stories for Boys Who Dare to Be Different, which has been translated into twenty-eight languages and received a British National Book Award.

He received a Somerset Maugham Award and Jerwood Fiction Prize for Lolito, and the Celsius 232 and Premio Torres del Agua for The Impossible Boy.

His novels have received praise from Nick Cave, Noel Fielding, Matt Haig and Dennis Cooper. He contributed the story "Kimchi or a Partial List of Misappropriated Hood Ornaments" to Frank Ocean's Boys Don't Cry, accompanying the release of the album Blonde (2016).

Having written for Series 4 and 5 of the award-winning German comedy series Jerks, he is now developing original TV projects in the UK and Germany.

== Books (Adult Fiction) ==
- Fences (2009)
- An Island of Fifty (2010)
- The Kasahara School of Nihilism (2010)
- Grow Up (2011)
- Upward Coast & Sadie (2012)
- Lolito (2013)
- Everyone Gets Eaten (2015)
- Hurra (2016)
- The Greatest Possible Good (2025)

== Books (Children) ==
- Stories for Boys Who Dare to be Different (2018)
- Stories for Kids Who Dare to be Different (2018)
- Stories for Boys Who Dare to be Different II (2019)
- The Impossible Boy (2019)
- Things They Don't Want You to Know (2020)
- The Greatest Inventor (2020)
- Not All Heroes Wear Capes (2021)
- Dare to Be Different: Inspirational Words from People Who Changed the World (2022)
- You Don't Have to be Loud: A Quiet Kid's Guide to Being Heard (2022)
- The Dragon on the Train (2023)

== Filmography ==
- Jerks (2022)
- Friends, Sex and Games (2026)
- Das Geschenk (2026)

== Awards ==
- Jerwood Fiction Uncovered Prize for Lolito (2014)
- Somerset Maugham Award for Lolito (2015)
- British Book Award as 'Children's Book of the Year' for Stories for Boys Who Dare to Be Different (2018)
- Sunday Times Young Writer of the Year Award shortlisted for The Greatest Possible Good (2025)
