= Publishing Genius =

Independent publisher

Publishing Genius is an independent publisher located in Westport, New York, originally based in Baltimore, Maryland. The press, run by Adam Robinson, has published novels, short stories and poetry since 2006, including work by Stephanie Barber, Rachel B. Glaser, Michael Kimball, Mairéad Byrne, Justin Sirois, Mike Young, Melissa Broder, Matthew Simmons, Joseph Young, Shane Jones, Chris Toll, and more. Publishing Genius also operated Everyday Genius, an online journal that was updated with new work daily. In 2015, Everyday Genius shifted to Real Pants, a blog about literature and the new literary community.

In 2009, Publishing Genius sold the film option to its first novel, Light Boxes by Shane Jones, to Spike Jonze. The publishing rights were later sold to Penguin Books.

The press was awarded "Best Publishing House" in Baltimore by the Baltimore City Paper. and again in 2013. Also in 2013, the press was listed as a top 25 indie press by Flavorwire.
