= Noah Cicero =

American novelist, short-story writer (born 1980)

- Born: October 10, 1980 (age 45); Youngstown, Ohio, U.S.
- Education: Youngstown State University
- Occupation: Novelist
- Writing career
- Genre: pop culture
- Notable works: Best Behavior, The Human War
- Website: noah-cicero.blogspot.com (no longer updated)

Noah Cicero (born October 10, 1980) is an American novelist, poet, and short-story writer. He lives in Las Vegas, Nevada. He is the author of nine books of fiction, two books of poetry, and two ebooks.

Cicero's stories, poetry, and essays have been published in magazines such as Scarecrow, Brittle Star, Retort, Nth Position, Black Ice, Identity Theory, Prague Literary Review, and many others. His fiction is anthologized in The Edgier Waters, published by 3:AM Magazine in 2006.

== Personal life ==
Cicero grew up in Vienna, Ohio, what he calls “a sleazy, one-red-light town.” His mother was a tow-motor driver and his father was a butcher at a Kmart. Cicero has said that he had no books in his house as a child and started to read ghost stories around 13 or 14 years of age. He graduated from Youngstown State University in 2013 with a degree in political science and government. In 2000, he was employed at the Grand Canyon but was fired due to drinking on the job. He later returned to the Grand Canyon, writing about his experiences in Give It to the Grand Canyon (2019). He lived in Seongnam in 2012 while teaching English; many of the poems in Bipolar Cowboy (2015) reference experiences from his time and relationships in South Korea. His first novel, The Human War (2003), was adapted into a movie and won the 2014 Beloit Film Festival award for Best Screenplay. He lives in Las Vegas, where he has worked at a supermarket and as a litigation-trial paralegal.

== Writing style ==
Cicero came to notoriety in the mid-2000s during the “alt-lit” movement, alongside writers like Tao Lin and Brandon Scott Gorrell. His writing covers a range of styles and genres, from poetry to prose and fiction to nonfiction. It focuses on themes such as American life, depression, poverty, existentialism, troubled relationships, consumerism, and Buddhism. Much of Cicero’s writing employs a flat, matter-of-fact tone. Of his writing, Cicero has said: “I have always written about humiliation and the failure of expectations, it has never changed.” He has cited Fyodor Dostoevsky, Jean Rhys, Richard Yates, and Richard Wright as some of his favorite authors. For the poems in Bipolar Cowboy, Cicero said he was influenced by Tang dynasty poets such as Du Fu and Li Bo. His books have been translated into Turkish, Kurdish, and Spanish.

== Bibliography ==
Novels

- The Human War (2003, Fugue State Press; foreign publications include Snowbooks, London 2007; as well as editions in Greek and German)
- The Condemned (2006, Six Gallery Press)
- Burning Babies (2006, Parlor Press)
- Treatise (2008, A-Head Publishing)
- The Insurgent (2010, Blatt)
- Best Behavior (2011, Civil Coping Mechanisms)
- Go to Work and Do Your Job. Care for Your Children. Pay Your Bills. Obey the Law. Buy Products. (2013, Lazy Fascist Press)
- Give It to the Grand Canyon (2019, Philosophical Idiot)
- Las Vegas Bootlegger: Empire of Self-Importance (2020, Trident Press)

Poetry

- Bipolar Cowboy (2015, Lazy Fascist Press)
- Nature Documentary: Poems (2018, House of Vlad)

Nonfiction

- Blood-Soaked Buddha/Hard Earth Pascal (2017, Trident Press)

eBooks

- The Living And The Dead (2006, Bear Parade)
- Nosferatu (2008, Bear Parade)

Anthology

- The Collected Works of Noah Cicero Vol. 1 (2013, Lazy Fascist Press)
- The Collected Works of Noah Cicero Vol. 2 (2014, Lazy Fascist Press)
- The Noah Cicero Bathroom Reader (2014, Lazy Fascist Press)
