= List of John Coltrane recording sessions =

American jazz saxophonist John Coltrane recorded many sessions in his lifetime as both a sideman and a bandleader.

Track	Length	Artist	Composer	Date	Studio	Location	Engineer	Notes	Personnel
"Cherryco"	6:45	John Coltrane and Don Cherry	D. Cherry	1960-06-28	Atlantic Recording Studios	New York, NY	Tom Dowd and Phil Iehle		Coltrane; ss, ts; Cherry, tp; Charlie Haden, b; Ed Blackwell, dr.
"The Blessing"	7:50	John Coltrane and Don Cherry	O. Coleman	1960-06-28	Atlantic Recording Studios	New York, NY	Tom Dowd and Phil Iehle		Coltrane; ss, ts; Cherry, tp; Charlie Haden, b; Ed Blackwell, dr.
"The Invisible"		John Coltrane and Don Cherry	O. Coleman	1960-06-28	Atlantic Recording Studios	New York, NY	Tom Dowd and Phil Iehle		Coltrane; ss, ts; Cherry, tp; Charlie Haden, b; Ed Blackwell, dr.
"Focus on Sanity"	12:07	John Coltrane and Don Cherry	O. Coleman	1960-07-08	Atlantic Recording Studios	New York, NY	Tom Dowd and Phil Iehle		Coltrane, ss, ts; Don Cherry, tp; Percy Heath, b; Ed Blackwell, dr
"The Blessing"		John Coltrane and Don Cherry	O. Coleman	1960-07-08	Atlantic Recording Studios	New York, NY	Tom Dowd and Phil Iehle		Coltrane, ss, ts; Don Cherry, tp; Percy Heath, b; Ed Blackwell, dr
"The Invisible"	4:08	John Coltrane and Don Cherry	O. Coleman	1960-07-08	Atlantic Recording Studios	New York, NY	Tom Dowd and Phil Iehle		Coltrane, ss, ts; Don Cherry, tp; Percy Heath, b; Ed Blackwell, dr
"Bemsha Swing"	5:02	John Coltrane and Don Cherry	T. Monk	1960-07-08	Atlantic Recording Studios	New York, NY	Tom Dowd and Phil Iehle		Coltrane, ss, ts; Don Cherry, tp; Percy Heath, b; Ed Blackwell, dr
"Mr. Day"	7:27	John Coltrane Quartet	J. Coltrane	1960-09-08	United Recorders	Los Angeles, CA			Coltrane, ss, ts; McCoy Tyner, p; Steve Davis, b; Billy Higgins, dr.
"Exotica" (alternate take)	4:36	John Coltrane Quartet	J. Coltrane	1960-09-08	United Recorders	Los Angeles, CA			Coltrane, ss, ts; McCoy Tyner, p; Steve Davis, b; Billy Higgins, dr.
"Exotica"	4:28	John Coltrane Quartet	J. Coltrane	1960-09-08	United Recorders	Los Angeles, CA			Coltrane, ss, ts;McCoy Tyner, p; Steve Davis, b; Billy Higgins, dr.
"Like Sonny"	3:49	John Coltrane Quartet	J. Coltrane	1960-09-08	United Recorders	Los Angeles, CA			Coltrane, ss, ts;McCoy Tyner, p; Steve Davis, b; Billy Higgins, dr.
"Village Blues"	5:21	John Coltrane Quartet	J. Coltrane	1960-10-21	Atlantic Recording Studios	New York, NY	Tom Dowd and Phil Iehle		Coltrane, ss, ts; McCoy Tyner, p; Steve Davis, b; Elvin Jones, dr.
"Equinox"		John Coltrane Quartet	J. Coltrane	1960-10-21	Atlantic Recording Studios	New York, NY	Tom Dowd and Phil Iehle		Coltrane, ss, ts; McCoy Tyner, p; Steve Davis, b; Elvin Jones, dr.
"My Favorite Things"	13:41	John Coltrane Quartet	R. Rodgers - O. Hammerstein	1960-10-21	Atlantic Recording Studios	New York, NY	Tom Dowd and Phil Iehle		Coltrane, ss, ts; McCoy Tyner, p; Steve Davis, b; Elvin Jones, dr.
"The Night Has a Thousand Eyes"		John Coltrane Quartet	Weisman - Garrett	1960-10-21	Atlantic Recording Studios	New York, NY	Tom Dowd and Phil Iehle		Coltrane, ss, ts; McCoy Tyner, p; Steve Davis, b; Elvin Jones, dr.
"Central Park West"	4:12	John Coltrane Quartet	J. Coltrane	1960-10-24	Atlantic Recording Studios	New York, NY	Tom Dowd		Coltrane, ss, ts; McCoy Tyner, p; Steve Davis, b; Elvin Jones, dr.
"Mr. Syms"	5:19	John Coltrane Quartet	J. Coltrane	1960-10-24	Atlantic Recording Studios	New York, NY	Tom Dowd		Coltrane, ss, ts; McCoy Tyner, p; Steve Davis, b; Elvin Jones, dr.
"Exotica"	5:20	John Coltrane Quartet	J. Coltrane	1960-10-24	Atlantic Recording Studios	New York, NY	Tom Dowd		Coltrane, ss, ts;McCoy Tyner, p; Steve Davis, b; Elvin Jones, dr.
"Summertime"	11:31	John Coltrane Quartet	D. Heywood - G. Gershwin	1960-10-24	Atlantic Recording Studios	New York, NY	Tom Dowd		Coltrane, ss, ts;McCoy Tyner, p; Steve Davis, b; Elvin Jones, dr.
"Body and Soul" (alternate take)	5:57	John Coltrane Quartet	J. Green - R. Sour - E. Heywood - F. Eyton	1960-10-24	Atlantic Recording Studios	New York, NY	Tom Dowd		Coltrane, ss, ts; McCoy Tyner, p; Steve Davis, b; Elvin Jones, dr.
"Body and Soul"	5:48	John Coltrane Quartet	J. Green - R. Sour - E. Heywood - F. Eyton	1960-10-24	Atlantic Recording Studios	New York, NY	Tom Dowd		Coltrane, ss, ts; McCoy Tyner, p; Steve Davis, b; Elvin Jones, dr.
"Lazy Bird"		John Coltrane Quartet		1960-10-24	Atlantic Recording Studios	New York, NY	Tom Dowd		McCoy Tyner, p; Steve Davis, b; Elvin Jones, dr.
"In Your Own Sweet Way"		John Coltrane Quartet		1960-10-24	Atlantic Recording Studios	New York, NY	Tom Dowd		McCoy Tyner, p; Steve Davis, b; Elvin Jones, dr.
"Mr. Knight"	7:30	John Coltrane Quartet	J. Coltrane	1960-10-24	Atlantic Recording Studios	New York, NY	Tom Dowd		Coltrane, ss, ts; McCoy Tyner, p; Steve Davis, b; Elvin Jones, dr.
"Blues to Elvin" (alternate take)	10:57	John Coltrane Quartet	E. Jones	1960-10-24	Atlantic Recording Studios	New York, NY	Tom Dowd		Coltrane, ss, ts; McCoy Tyner, p; Steve Davis, b; Elvin Jones, dr.
"Blues to Elvin" (incomplete false start)		John Coltrane Quartet	E. Jones	1960-10-24	Atlantic Recording Studios	New York, NY	Tom Dowd		Coltrane, ss, ts; McCoy Tyner, p; Steve Davis, b; Elvin Jones, dr.
"Blues to Elvin" (alternate take)		John Coltrane Quartet	E. Jones	1960-10-24	Atlantic Recording Studios	New York, NY	Tom Dowd		Coltrane, ss, ts; McCoy Tyner, p; Steve Davis, b; Elvin Jones, dr.
"Blues to Elvin"	7:51	John Coltrane Quartet	E. Jones	1960-10-24	Atlantic Recording Studios	New York, NY	Tom Dowd		Coltrane, ss, ts; McCoy Tyner, p; Steve Davis, b; Elvin Jones, dr.
"Mr. Day"	7:56	John Coltrane Quartet	J. Coltrane	1960-10-24	Atlantic Recording Studios	New York, NY	Tom Dowd		Coltrane, ss, ts; McCoy Tyner, p; Steve Davis, b; Elvin Jones, dr.
"Blues to You" (alternate take)	5:32	John Coltrane Quartet	J. Coltrane	1960-10-24	Atlantic Recording Studios	New York, NY	Tom Dowd		Coltrane, ss, ts; McCoy Tyner, p; Steve Davis, b; Elvin Jones, dr.
"Blues to You (alternate take)"		John Coltrane Quartet	J. Coltrane	1960-10-24	Atlantic Recording Studios	New York, NY	Tom Dowd		Coltrane, ss, ts; McCoy Tyner, p; Steve Davis, b; Elvin Jones, dr.
"Blues to You"	6:25	John Coltrane Quartet	J. Coltrane	1960-10-24	Atlantic Recording Studios	New York, NY	Tom Dowd		Coltrane, ss, ts; McCoy Tyner, p; Steve Davis, b; Elvin Jones, dr.
"Blues to Bechet"	5:44	John Coltrane Quartet	J. Coltrane	1960-10-24	Atlantic Recording Studios	New York, NY	Tom Dowd		Coltrane, ss, ts; McCoy Tyner, p; Steve Davis, b; Elvin Jones, dr.
"Satellite"	5:48	John Coltrane Quartet	J. Coltrane	1960-10-24	Atlantic Recording Studios	New York, NY	Tom Dowd		Coltrane, ss, ts; McCoy Tyner, p; Steve Davis, b; Elvin Jones, dr.
"Everytime We Say Goodbye"	5:39	John Coltrane Quartet	C. Porter	1960-10-26	Atlantic Recording Studios	New York, NY	Tom Dowd		Coltrane, ss, ts; McCoy Tyner, p; Steve Davis, b; Elvin Jones, dr.
"26-2"	6:09	John Coltrane Quartet	J. Coltrane	1960-10-26	Atlantic Recording Studios	New York, NY	Tom Dowd		Coltrane, ss, ts; McCoy Tyner, p; Steve Davis, b; Elvin Jones, dr.
"But Not for Me"	9:35	John Coltrane Quartet	G. Gershwin - I. Gershwin	1960-10-26	Atlantic Recording Studios	New York, NY	Tom Dowd		Coltrane, ss, ts; McCoy Tyner, p; Steve Davis, b; Elvin Jones, dr.
"Liberia"	6:45	John Coltrane Quartet	J. Coltrane	1960-10-26	Atlantic Recording Studios	New York, NY	Tom Dowd		Coltrane, ss, ts; McCoy Tyner, p; Steve Davis, b; Elvin Jones, dr.
"The Night Has a Thousand Eyes"	6:42	John Coltrane Quartet	B. Weisman - M. Garrett	1960-10-26	Atlantic Recording Studios	New York, NY	Tom Dowd		Coltrane, ss, ts; McCoy Tyner, p; Steve Davis, b; Elvin Jones, dr.
"Equinox"	8:33	John Coltrane Quartet	J. Coltrane	1960-10-26	Atlantic Recording Studios	New York, NY	Tom Dowd		Coltrane, ss, ts; McCoy Tyner, p; Steve Davis, b; Elvin Jones, dr.
"Greensleeves"	9:55	John Coltrane Orchestra	traditional	1961-05-23	Van Gelder Studio	Englewood Cliffs, NJ	Rudy Van Gelder		Booker Little, Freddie Hubbard, tp; Julian Priester, Charles Greenlee, euphonium; Julius Watkins, Bob Northern, Jimmy Buffington, Robert Swisshelm, frh; Bill Barber, tu; Eric Dolphy, as, fl; Garvin Bushell, reeds, woodwinds; Laurdine "Pat" Patrick, bars; Coltrane, ss, ts; McCoy Tyner, p; Reggie Workman, Paul Chambers, b; Elvin Jones, dr; .
"Song of the Underground Railroad"	6:37	John Coltrane Orchestra	traditional, arr. Coltrane	1961-05-23	Van Gelder Studio	Englewood Cliffs, NJ	Rudy Van Gelder		Booker Little, Freddie Hubbard, tp; Julian Priester, Charles Greenlee, euphonium; Julius Watkins, Bob Northern, Jimmy buffington, Robert Swisshelm, frh; Bill Barber, tu; Eric Dolphy, as, fl; Garvin Bushell, reeds, woodwinds; Laurdine "Pat" Patrick, bars; Coltrane, ss, ts; McCoy Tyner, p; Reggie Workman, Paul Chambers, b; Elvin Jones, dr; .
"Greensleeves" (alternate take)	10:49	John Coltrane Orchestra	traditional, arr. M. Tyner	1961-05-23	Van Gelder Studio	Englewood Cliffs, NJ	Rudy Van Gelder		Booker Little, Freddie Hubbard, tp; Julian Priester, Charles Greenlee, euphonium; Julius Watkins, Bob Northern, Jimmy Buffington, Robert Swisshelm, frh; Bill Barber, tu; Eric Dolphy, as, fl; Garvin Bushell, reeds, woodwinds; Laurdine "Pat" Patrick, bars; Coltrane, ss, ts; McCoy Tyner, p; Reggie Workman, Paul Chambers, b; Elvin Jones, dr; .
"The Damned Don’t Cry"	7:38	John Coltrane Orchestra	C. Massey	1961-05-23	Van Gelder Studio	Englewood Cliffs, NJ	Rudy Van Gelder		Booker Little, Freddie Hubbard, tp; Julian Priester, Charles Greenlee, euphonium; Julius Watkins, Bob Northern, Jimmy Buffington, Robert Swisshelm, frh; Bill Barber, tu; Eric Dolphy, as, fl; Garvin Bushell, reeds, woodwinds; Laurdine "Pat" Patrick, bars; Coltrane, ss, ts; McCoy Tyner, p; Reggie Workman, Paul Chambers, b; Elvin Jones, dr; .
"Africa"	14:06	John Coltrane Orchestra	J. Coltrane	1961-05-23	Van Gelder Studio	Englewood Cliffs, NJ	Rudy Van Gelder		Booker Little, Freddie Hubbard, tp; Julian Priester, Charles Greenlee, euphonium; Julius Watkins, Bob Northern, Jimmy Buffington, Robert Swisshelm, frh; Bill Barber, tu; Eric Dolphy, as, fl; Garvin Bushell, reeds, woodwinds; Laurdine "Pat" Patrick, bars; Coltrane, ss, ts; McCoy Tyner, p; Reggie Workman, Paul Chambers, b; Elvin Jones, dr; .
"Olé"	18:05	John Coltrane Group	J. Coltrane	1961-05-25	A&R Studios	New York, NY	Phil Ramone		Freddie Hubbard, tp; Coltrane, ss, ts; Eric Dolphy, as fl; McCoy Tyner, p; Art Davis, Reggie Workman, b; Elvin Jones, dr.
"Dahomey Dance"	10:50	John Coltrane Group	J. Coltrane	1961-05-25	A&R Studios	New York, NY	Phil Ramone		Freddie Hubbard, tp; Coltrane, ss, ts; Eric Dolphy, as fl; McCoy Tyner, p; Art Davis, Reggie Workman, b; Elvin Jones, dr.
"Aisha"	7:32	John Coltrane Group	M. Tyner	1961-05-25	A&R Studios	New York, NY	Phil Ramone		Freddie Hubbard, tp; Coltrane, ss, ts; Eric Dolphy, as fl; McCoy Tyner, p; Art Davis, Reggie Workman, b; Elvin Jones, dr.
"To Her Ladyship"	8:54	John Coltrane Group	B. Frazier	1961-05-25	A&R Studios	New York, NY	Phil Ramone		Freddie Hubbard, tp; Coltrane, ss, ts; Eric Dolphy, as fl; McCoy Tyner, p; Art Davis, Reggie Workman, b; Elvin Jones, dr.
"Africa" (alternate take)	16:06	John Coltrane Orchestra	J. Coltrane	1961-06-07	Van Gelder Studio	Englewood Cliffs, NJ	Rudy Van Gelder		Booker Little, tp; Britt Woodman, tb; Carl Bowman euphonium; Julius Watkins, Donald Corrado, Bob Northern, Robert Swisshelm, frh; Bill Barber, tu; Eric Dolphy, as, fl, bcl; Laurdine 'Pat' Patrick, bars; Coltrane, ss, ts; McCoy Tyner, p; Reggie Workman, Art Davis, b; Elvin Jones, dr; .
"Africa"	16:29	John Coltrane Orchestra	J. Coltrane	1961-06-07	Van Gelder Studio	Englewood Cliffs, NJ	Rudy Van Gelder		Booker Little, tp; Britt Woodman, tb; Carl Bowman euphonium; Julius Watkins, Donald Corrado, Bob Northern, Robert Swisshelm, frh; Bill Barber, tu; Eric Dolphy, as, fl, bcl; Laurdine 'Pat' Patrick, bars; Coltrane, ss, ts; McCoy Tyner, p; Reggie Workman, Art Davis, b; Elvin Jones, dr; .
"Blues Minor"	7:22	John Coltrane Orchestra	J. Coltrane	1961-06-07	Van Gelder Studio	Englewood Cliffs, NJ	Rudy Van Gelder		Booker Little, tp; Britt Woodman, tb; Carl Bowman euphonium; Julius Watkins, Donald Corrado, Bob Northern, Robert Swisshelm, frh; Bill Barber, tu; Eric Dolphy, as, fl, bcl; Laurdine 'Pat' Patrick, bars; Coltrane, ss, ts; McCoy Tyner, p; Reggie Workman, Art Davis, b; Elvin Jones, dr; .
"Impressions"	6:06	John Coltrane Quintet	J. Coltrane	1961-07-01	Newport Jazz Festival	Newport, RI			Coltrane, ss, ts; McCoy Tyner, p; Art Davis, Reggie Workman, b; Elvin Jones, dr.
"Naima"	4:05	John Coltrane Quintet	J. Coltrane	1961-07-01	Newport Jazz Festival	Newport, RI			Coltrane, ss, ts; McCoy Tyner, p; Art Davis, Reggie Workman, b; Elvin Jones, dr.
"My Favorite Things"	16:27	John Coltrane Quintet	R. Rodgers - O. Hammerstein	1961-07-01	Newport Jazz Festival	Newport, RI			Coltrane, ss, ts; McCoy Tyner, p; Art Davis, Reggie Workman, b; Elvin Jones, dr.
"India"	10:17	John Coltrane Group	J. Coltrane	1961-11-01	Village Vanguard	New York, NY	Rudy Van Gelder		Coltrane, ss, ts; Eric Dolphy, as, bcl; Garvin Bushell, oboe, contrabassoon; Ahmed Abdul-Malik, tamboura; McCoy Tyner, p; Jimmy Garrison, Reggie Workman, b; Elvin Jones, dr.
"Chasin' the Trane"	9:41	John Coltrane Group	J. Coltrane	1961-11-01	Village Vanguard	New York, NY	Rudy Van Gelder		Coltrane, ss, ts; Eric Dolphy, as, bcl; Garvin Bushell, oboe, contrabassoon; Ahmed Abdul-Malik, tamboura; McCoy Tyner, p; Jimmy Garrison, Reggie Workman, b; Elvin Jones, dr.
"Impressions"	8:42	John Coltrane Group	J. Coltrane	1961-11-01	Village Vanguard	New York, NY	Rudy Van Gelder		Coltrane, ss, ts; Eric Dolphy, as, bcl; Garvin Bushell, oboe, contrabassoon; Ahmed Abdul-Malik, tamboura; McCoy Tyner, p; Jimmy Garrison, Reggie Workman, b; Elvin Jones, dr.
"Spiritual"	12:29	John Coltrane Group	J. Coltrane	1961-11-01	Village Vanguard	New York, NY	Rudy Van Gelder		Coltrane, ss, ts; Eric Dolphy, as, bcl; Garvin Bushell, oboe, contrabassoon; Ahmed Abdul-Malik, tamboura; McCoy Tyner, p; Jimmy Garrison, Reggie Workman, b; Elvin Jones, dr.
"The Red Planet"	9:53	John Coltrane Group	J.Coltrane - E. Dolphy	1961-11-01	Village Vanguard	New York, NY	Rudy Van Gelder		Coltrane, ss, ts; Eric Dolphy, as, bcl; Garvin Bushell, oboe, contrabassoon; Ahmed Abdul-Malik, tamboura; McCoy Tyner, p; Jimmy Garrison, Reggie Workman, b; Elvin Jones, dr.
"Naima"	7:33	John Coltrane Group	J. Coltrane	1961-11-01	Village Vanguard	New York, NY	Rudy Van Gelder		Coltrane, ss, ts; Eric Dolphy, as, bcl; Garvin Bushell, oboe, contrabassoon; Ahmed Abdul-Malik, tamboura; McCoy Tyner, p; Jimmy Garrison, Reggie Workman, b; Elvin Jones, dr.
"Brasilia"	18:35	John Coltrane Group	J. Coltrane	1961-11-01	Village Vanguard	New York, NY	Rudy Van Gelder		Coltrane, ss, ts; Eric Dolphy, as, bcl; Garvin Bushell, oboe, contrabassoon; Ahmed Abdul-Malik, tamboura; McCoy Tyner, p; Jimmy Garrison, Reggie Workman, b; Elvin Jones, dr.
"Chasin’ Another Trane"	15:26	John Coltrane Group	J. Coltrane	1961-11-02	Village Vanguard	New York, NY	Rudy Van Gelder		Coltrane, ss, ts; Eric Dolphy, as, bcl; Garvin Bushell, oboe, contrabassoon; Ahmed Abdul-Malik, tamboura; McCoy Tyner, p; Jimmy Garrison, Reggie Workman, b; Elvin Jones or Roy Haynes, dr.
"India"	13:14	John Coltrane Group	J. Coltrane	1961-11-02	Village Vanguard	New York, NY	Rudy Van Gelder		Coltrane, ss, ts; Eric Dolphy, as, bcl; Garvin Bushell, oboe, contrabassoon; Ahmed Abdul-Malik, tamboura; McCoy Tyner, p; Jimmy Garrison, Reggie Workman, b; Elvin Jones or Roy Haynes, dr.
"Spiritual"	15:03	John Coltrane Group	J. Coltrane	1961-11-02	Village Vanguard	New York, NY	Rudy Van Gelder		Coltrane, ss, ts; Eric Dolphy, as, bcl; Garvin Bushell, oboe, contrabassoon; Ahmed Abdul-Malik, tamboura; McCoy Tyner, p; Jimmy Garrison, Reggie Workman, b; Elvin Jones or Roy Haynes, dr.
"Softly, as in a Morning Sunrise"	6:25	John Coltrane Group	Romberg	1961-11-02	Village Vanguard	New York, NY	Rudy Van Gelder		Coltrane, ss, ts; Eric Dolphy, as, bcl; Garvin Bushell, oboe, contrabassoon; Ahmed Abdul-Malik, tamboura; McCoy Tyner, p; Jimmy Garrison, Reggie Workman, b; Elvin Jones or Roy Haynes, dr.
"Chasin' the Trane"	15:55	John Coltrane Group	J. Coltrane	1961-11-02	Village Vanguard	New York, NY	Rudy Van Gelder		Coltrane, ss, ts; Eric Dolphy, as, bcl; Garvin Bushell, oboe, contrabassoon; Ahmed Abdul-Malik, tamboura; McCoy Tyner, p; Jimmy Garrison, Reggie Workman, b; Elvin Jones or Roy Haynes, dr.
"Greensleeves"	6:08	John Coltrane Group	traditional, arr M. Tyner	1961-11-02	Village Vanguard	New York, NY	Rudy Van Gelder		Coltrane, ss, ts; Eric Dolphy, as, bcl; Garvin Bushell, oboe, contrabassoon; Ahmed Abdul-Malik, tamboura; McCoy Tyner, p; Jimmy Garrison, Reggie Workman, b; Elvin Jones or Roy Haynes, dr.
"Impressions"	10:49	John Coltrane Group	J. Coltrane	1961-11-02	Village Vanguard	New York, NY	Rudy Van Gelder		Coltrane, ss, ts; Eric Dolphy, as, bcl; Garvin Bushell, oboe, contrabassoon; Ahmed Abdul-Malik, tamboura; McCoy Tyner, p; Jimmy Garrison, Reggie Workman, b; Elvin Jones or Roy Haynes, dr.
"Spiritual"	13:31	John Coltrane Group	J. Coltrane	1961-11-03	Village Vanguard	New York, NY	Rudy Van Gelder		Coltrane, ss, ts; Eric Dolphy, as, bcl; McCoy Tyner, p; Jimmy Garrison, Reggie Workman, b; Elvin Jones, dr.
"Naima"	7:02	John Coltrane Group	J. Coltrane	1961-11-03	Village Vanguard	New York, NY	Rudy Van Gelder		Coltrane, ss, ts; Eric Dolphy, as, bcl; McCoy Tyner, p; Jimmy Garrison, Reggie Workman, b; Elvin Jones, dr.
"Impressions"	14:45	John Coltrane Group	J. Coltrane	1961-11-03	Village Vanguard	New York, NY	Rudy Van Gelder		Coltrane, ss, ts; Eric Dolphy, as, bcl; McCoy Tyner, p; Jimmy Garrison, Reggie Workman, b; Elvin Jones, dr.
"India"	13:55	John Coltrane Group	J. Coltrane	1961-11-03	Village Vanguard	New York, NY	Rudy Van Gelder		Coltrane, ss, ts; Eric Dolphy, as, bcl; McCoy Tyner, p; Jimmy Garrison, Reggie Workman, b; Elvin Jones, dr.
"Greensleeves"	4:51	John Coltrane Group	traditional, arr M. Tyner	1961-11-03	Village Vanguard	New York, NY	Rudy Van Gelder		Coltrane, ss, ts; Eric Dolphy, as, bcl; McCoy Tyner, p; Jimmy Garrison, Reggie Workman, b; Elvin Jones, dr.
"The Red Planet"	15:12	John Coltrane Group	J.Coltrane - E. Dolphy	1961-11-03	Village Vanguard	New York, NY	Rudy Van Gelder		Coltrane, ss, ts; Eric Dolphy, as, bcl; McCoy Tyner, p; Jimmy Garrison, Reggie Workman, b; Elvin Jones, dr.
"India"	15:06	John Coltrane Group	J. Coltrane	1961-11-05	Village Vanguard	New York, NY	Rudy Van Gelder		Coltrane, ss, ts; Eric Dolphy, as, bcl; Garvin Bushell, oboe, contrabassoon; Ahmed Abdul-Malik, tamboura; McCoy Tyner, p; Jimmy Garrison, Reggie Workman, b; Elvin Jones, dr.
"Spiritual"	20:29	John Coltrane Group	J. Coltrane	1961-11-05	Village Vanguard	New York, NY	Rudy Van Gelder		Coltrane, ss, ts; Eric Dolphy, as, bcl; Garvin Bushell, oboe, contrabassoon; Ahmed Abdul-Malik, tamboura; McCoy Tyner, p; Jimmy Garrison, Reggie Workman, b; Elvin Jones, dr.
"Blue Trane"	12:40	John Coltrane Quintet	J. Coltrane	1961-11-18	Olympia Theatre	Paris, France			Coltrane, ss, ts; Eric Dolphy, fl, as, bcl; McCoy Tyner, p; Reggie Workman, b; Elvin Jones, dr.
"I Want to Talk About You"	6:45	John Coltrane Quintet	B. Eckstine	1961-11-18	Olympia Theatre	Paris, France			Coltrane, ss, ts; Eric Dolphy, fl, as, bcl; McCoy Tyner, p; Reggie Workman, b; Elvin Jones, dr.
"Impressions"	10:41	John Coltrane Quintet	J. Coltrane	1961-11-18	Olympia Theatre	Paris, France			Coltrane, ss, ts; Eric Dolphy, fl, as, bcl; McCoy Tyner, p; Reggie Workman, b; Elvin Jones, dr.
"My Favorite Things	22:21	John Coltrane Quintet	R. Rodgers - O. Hammerstein	1961-11-18	Olympia Theatre	Paris, France			Coltrane, ss, ts; Eric Dolphy, fl, as, bcl; McCoy Tyner, p; Reggie Workman, b; Elvin Jones, dr.
"I Want to Talk About You"	9:27	John Coltrane Quintet	B. Eckstine	1961-11-18	Olympia Theatre	Paris, France			Coltrane, ss, ts; Eric Dolphy, fl, as, bcl; McCoy Tyner, p; Reggie Workman, b; Elvin Jones, dr.
"Blue Trane"	12:40	John Coltrane Quintet	J. Coltrane	1961-11-18	Olympia Theatre	Paris, France			Coltrane, ss, ts; Eric Dolphy, fl, as, bcl; McCoy Tyner, p; Reggie Workman, b; Elvin Jones, dr.
"My Favorite Things"	25:11	John Coltrane Quintet	R. Rodgers - O. Hammerstein	1961-11-18	Olympia Theatre	Paris, France			Coltrane, ss, ts; Eric Dolphy, fl, as, bcl; McCoy Tyner, p; Reggie Workman, b; Elvin Jones, dr.
"Delilah"	11:16	John Coltrane Quintet	V. Young	1961-11-20	Falkonercentret	Copenhagen, Denmark			Coltrane, ss, ts; Eric Dolphy, fl, as, bcl; McCoy Tyner, p; Reggie Workman, b; Elvin Jones, dr.
"Everytime We Say Goodbye"	4:43	John Coltrane Quintet	C. Porter	1961-11-20	Falkonercentret	Copenhagen, Denmark			Coltrane, ss, ts; Eric Dolphy, fl, as, bcl; McCoy Tyner, p; Reggie Workman, b; Elvin Jones, dr.
"Impressions"	12:53	John Coltrane Quintet	J. Coltrane	1961-11-20	Falkonercentret	Copenhagen, Denmark			Coltrane, ss, ts; Eric Dolphy, fl, as, bcl; McCoy Tyner, p; Reggie Workman, b; Elvin Jones, dr.
"Naima"	6:46	John Coltrane Quintet	J. Coltrane	1961-11-20	Falkonercentret	Copenhagen, Denmark			Coltrane, ss, ts; Eric Dolphy, fl, as, bcl; McCoy Tyner, p; Reggie Workman, b; Elvin Jones, dr.
"My Favorite Things"	27:19	John Coltrane Quintet	R. Rodgers - O. Hammerstein	1961-11-20	Falkonercentret	Copenhagen, Denmark			Coltrane, ss, ts; Eric Dolphy, fl, as, bcl; McCoy Tyner, p; Reggie Workman, b; Elvin Jones, dr.
"Blue Trane"	20:48	John Coltrane Quintet	J. Coltrane	1961-11-23	Koncerthuset	Stockholm, Sweden			Coltrane, ss, ts; Eric Dolphy, as, bcl, fl; McCoy Tyner, p; Reggie Workman, b; Elvin Jones, dr.
"Naima"	4:00	John Coltrane Quintet	J. Coltrane	1961-11-23	Koncerthuset	Stockholm, Sweden			Coltrane, ss, ts; Eric Dolphy, as, bcl, fl; McCoy Tyner, p; Reggie Workman, b; Elvin Jones, dr.
"Impressions"	7:11	John Coltrane Quintet	J. Coltrane	1961-11-23	Koncerthuset	Stockholm, Sweden			Coltrane, ss, ts; Eric Dolphy, as, bcl, fl; McCoy Tyner, p; Reggie Workman, b; Elvin Jones, dr.
"My Favorite Things"	20:48	John Coltrane Quintet	R. Rodgers - O. Hammerstein	1961-11-23	Koncerthuset	Stockholm, Sweden			Coltrane, ss, ts; Eric Dolphy, as, bcl, fl; McCoy Tyner, p; Reggie Workman, b; Elvin Jones, dr.
"Naima"	2:25	John Coltrane Quintet	J. Coltrane	1961-11-23	Koncerthuset	Stockholm, Sweden			Coltrane, ss, ts; Eric Dolphy, as, bcl, fl; McCoy Tyner, p; Reggie Workman, b; Elvin Jones, dr.
"Impressions"	11:30	John Coltrane Quintet	J. Coltrane	1961-11-23	Koncerthuset	Stockholm, Sweden			Coltrane, ss, ts; Eric Dolphy, as, bcl, fl; McCoy Tyner, p; Reggie Workman, b; Elvin Jones, dr.
"My Favorite Things"	25:55	John Coltrane Quintet	R. Rodgers - O. Hammerstein	1961-11-23	Koncerthuset	Stockholm, Sweden			Coltrane, ss, ts; Eric Dolphy, as, bcl, fl; McCoy Tyner, p; Reggie Workman, b; Elvin Jones, dr.
"My Favorite Things"	11:06	John Coltrane Quintet	R. Rodgers - O. Hammerstein	1961-11-24	Sudwestfunk TV Studio				Coltrane, ss, ts; Eric Dolphy, as, bcl, fl; McCoy Tyner, p; Reggie Workman, b; Elvin Jones, dr.
"Everytime We Say Goodbye"	5:25	John Coltrane Quintet	C. Porter	1961-11-24	Sudwestfunk TV Studio				Coltrane, ss, ts; Eric Dolphy, as, bcl, fl; McCoy Tyner, p; Reggie Workman, b; Elvin Jones, dr.
"Impressions"	7:30	John Coltrane Quintet	J. Coltrane	1961-11-24	Sudwestfunk TV Studio				Coltrane, ss, ts; Eric Dolphy, as, bcl, fl; McCoy Tyner, p; Reggie Workman, b; Elvin Jones, dr.
"Unknown Title"		John Coltrane Quintet		1961-11-24	Sudwestfunk TV Studio				Coltrane, ss, ts; Eric Dolphy, as, bcl, fl; McCoy Tyner, p; Reggie Workman, b; Elvin Jones, dr.
"Greensleeves"	3:42	John Coltrane Quartet	Traditional, arranged M. Tyner	1961-12-21	prob Van Gelder Studio	Englewood Cliffs, NJ	prob Rudy Van Gelder		Coltrane, ss, ts; McCoy Tyner, p; Reggie Workman, b; Elvin Jones, dr.
"It's Easy to Remember"	2:45	John Coltrane Quartet	L. Hart - R. Rodgers	1961-12-21	prob Van Gelder Studio	Englewood Cliffs, NJ	prob Rudy Van Gelder		Coltrane, ss, ts; McCoy Tyner, p; Reggie Workman, b; Elvin Jones, dr.
"Mr. P.C."	11:00	John Coltrane Quintet	J. Coltrane	1962-02-09	Birdland	New York, NY			Coltrane, ss, ts; Eric Dolphy, as, bcl, fl; McCoy Tyner, p; Jimmy Garrison, b; Elvin Jones, dr.
"My Favorite Things"	18:41	John Coltrane Quintet	R. Rodgers - O. Hammerstein	1962-02-09	Birdland	New York, NY			Coltrane, ss, ts; Eric Dolphy, as, bcl, fl; McCoy Tyner, p; Jimmy Garrison, b; Elvin Jones, dr.
"The Red Planet"	10:39	John Coltrane Quintet	E. Dolphy - J. Coltrane	1962-02-09	Birdland	New York, NY			Coltrane, ss, ts; Eric Dolphy, as, bcl, fl; McCoy Tyner, p; Jimmy Garrison, b; Elvin Jones, dr.
"Soul Eyes"		John Coltrane Quartet	M. Waldron	1962-04-11	Van Gelder Studio	Englewood Cliffs, NJ	Rudy Van Gelder		Coltrane, ss, ts; McCoy Tyner, p; Jimmy Garrison, b; Elvin Jones, dr.
"The Inchworm"	6:14	John Coltrane Quartet	F. Loesser	1962-04-11	Van Gelder Studio	Englewood Cliffs, NJ	Rudy Van Gelder		Coltrane, ss, ts; McCoy Tyner, p; Jimmy Garrison, b; Elvin Jones, dr.
"Big Nick"	4:15	John Coltrane Quartet	J. Coltrane	1962-04-11	Van Gelder Studio	Englewood Cliffs, NJ	Rudy Van Gelder		Coltrane, ss, ts; McCoy Tyner, p; Jimmy Garrison, b; Elvin Jones, dr.
"Soul Eyes"		John Coltrane Quartet	M. Waldron	1962-04-12	Van Gelder Studio	Englewood Cliffs, NJ	Rudy Van Gelder		Coltrane, ss, ts; McCoy Tyner, p; Jimmy Garrison, b; Elvin Jones, dr.
"Excerpt"		John Coltrane Quartet	J. Coltrane	1962-04-12	Van Gelder Studio	Englewood Cliffs, NJ	Rudy Van Gelder		Coltrane, ss, ts; McCoy Tyner, p; Jimmy Garrison, b; Elvin Jones, dr.
"Body and Soul"		John Coltrane Quartet	Green-Sour-Heyman-Eyton	1962-04-12	Van Gelder Studio	Englewood Cliffs, NJ	Rudy Van Gelder		Coltrane, ss, ts; McCoy Tyner, p; Jimmy Garrison, b; Elvin Jones, dr.
"Neptune"		John Coltrane Quartet	J. Coltrane	1962-04-12	Van Gelder Studio	Englewood Cliffs, NJ	Rudy Van Gelder		Coltrane, ss, ts; McCoy Tyner, p; Jimmy Garrison, b; Elvin Jones, dr.
"My Favorite Things"	13:55	John Coltrane Quartet	R. Rodgers - O. Hammerstein	1962-06-02	Birdland	New York, NY			Coltrane, ss, ts; McCoy Tyner, p; Jimmy Garrison, b; Elvin Jones, dr.
"Body and Soul"	9:54	John Coltrane Quartet	Green-Sour-Heyman-Eyton	1962-06-02	Birdland	New York, NY			Coltrane, ss, ts; McCoy Tyner, p; Jimmy Garrison, b; Elvin Jones, dr.
"Cousin Mary"	5:00	John Coltrane Quartet	J. Coltrane	1962-06-02	Birdland	New York, NY			Coltrane, ss, ts;McCoy Tyner, p; Jimmy Garrison, b; Elvin Jones, dr.
"Not Yet"		John Coltrane Quartet	J. Coltrane	1962-06-19	Van Gelder Studio	Englewood Cliffs, NJ	Rudy Van Gelder		Coltrane, ss, ts; McCoy Tyner, p; Jimmy Garrison, b; Elvin Jones, dr.
"Out of This World"	14:02	John Coltrane Quartet	H. Arlen - J. Mercer	1962-06-19	Van Gelder Studio	Englewood Cliffs, NJ	Rudy Van Gelder		Coltrane, ss, ts; McCoy Tyner, p; Jimmy Garrison, b; Elvin Jones, dr.
"Soul Eyes"	5:22	John Coltrane Quartet	M. Waldron	1962-06-19	Van Gelder Studio	Englewood Cliffs, NJ	Rudy Van Gelder		Coltrane, ss, ts; McCoy Tyner, p; Jimmy Garrison, b; Elvin Jones, dr.
"Excerpt"		John Coltrane Quartet	J. Coltrane	1962-06-19	Van Gelder Studio	Englewood Cliffs, NJ	Rudy Van Gelder		Coltrane, ss, ts; McCoy Tyner, p; Jimmy Garrison, b; Elvin Jones, dr.
"Not Yet"		John Coltrane Quartet	J. Coltrane	1962-06-20	Van Gelder Studio	Englewood Cliffs, NJ	Rudy Van Gelder		Coltrane, ss, ts; McCoy Tyner, p; Jimmy Garrison, b; Elvin Jones, dr.
"Miles' Mode"	7:30	John Coltrane Quartet	J. Coltrane	1962-06-20	Van Gelder Studio	Englewood Cliffs, NJ	Rudy Van Gelder		Coltrane, ss, ts; McCoy Tyner, p; Jimmy Garrison, b; Elvin Jones, dr.
"Two, Three, Four"		John Coltrane Quartet	J. Coltrane	1962-06-20	Van Gelder Studio	Englewood Cliffs, NJ	Rudy Van Gelder		Coltrane, ss, ts; McCoy Tyner, p; Jimmy Garrison, b; Elvin Jones, dr.
"Impressions"	6:40	John Coltrane Quartet	J. Coltrane	1962-06-20	Van Gelder Studio	Englewood Cliffs, NJ	Rudy Van Gelder		Coltrane, ss, ts;McCoy Tyner, p; Jimmy Garrison, b; Elvin Jones, dr.
"Two, Three, Four"		John Coltrane Quartet	J. Coltrane	1962-06-20	Van Gelder Studio	Englewood Cliffs, NJ	Rudy Van Gelder		Coltrane, ss, ts; McCoy Tyner, p; Jimmy Garrison, b; Elvin Jones, dr.
"Impressions"	4:30	John Coltrane Quartet	J. Coltrane	1962-06-20	Van Gelder Studio	Englewood Cliffs, NJ	Rudy Van Gelder		Coltrane, ss, ts; McCoy Tyner, p; Jimmy Garrison, b; Elvin Jones, dr.
"Tunji"	6:33	John Coltrane Quartet	J. Coltrane	1962-06-29	Van Gelder Studio	Englewood Cliffs, NJ	Rudy Van Gelder		Coltrane, ss, ts; McCoy Tyner, p; Jimmy Garrison, b; Elvin Jones, dr.
"Out of This World"		John Coltrane Quartet	H. Arlen - J. Mercer	1962-06-29	Van Gelder Studio	Englewood Cliffs, NJ	Rudy Van Gelder		Coltrane, ss, ts; McCoy Tyner, p; Jimmy Garrison, b; Elvin Jones, dr.
"Nancy"	3:09	John Coltrane Quartet	J. Van Heusen- P. Silvers	1962-09-18	Van Gelder Studio	Englewood Cliffs, NJ	Rudy Van Gelder		Coltrane, ss, ts; McCoy Tyner, p; Jimmy Garrison, b; Elvin Jones, dr.
"What's New?"	3:43	John Coltrane Quartet	B. Haggert - J. Burke	1962-09-18	Van Gelder Studio	Englewood Cliffs, NJ	Rudy Van Gelder		Coltrane, ss, ts; McCoy Tyner, p; Jimmy Garrison, b; Elvin Jones, dr.
"Up 'Gainst the Wall"	3:12	John Coltrane Quartet	J. Coltrane	1962-09-18	Van Gelder Studio	Englewood Cliffs, NJ	Rudy Van Gelder		Coltrane, ss, ts; McCoy Tyner, p; Jimmy Garrison, b; Elvin Jones, dr.
"Stevie"	4:20	Duke Ellington and John Coltrane	D. Ellington	1962-09-26	Van Gelder Studio	Englewood Cliffs, NJ	Rudy Van Gelder		Coltrane, ss, ts; Ellington, p; Aaron Bell or Jimmy Garrison, b; Sam Woodyard or Elvin Jones, dr
"In a Sentimental Mood"	4:12	Duke Ellington and John Coltrane	J. Mills-M.Kurtz-D.Ellington	1962-09-26	Van Gelder Studio	Englewood Cliffs, NJ	Rudy Van Gelder		Coltrane, ss, ts; Ellington, p; Aaron Bell or Jimmy Garrison, b; Sam Woodyard or Elvin Jones, dr
"Angelica"	5:56	Duke Ellington and John Coltrane	D. Ellington	1962-09-26	Van Gelder Studio	Englewood Cliffs, NJ	Rudy Van Gelder		Coltrane, ss, ts; Ellington, p; Aaron Bell or Jimmy Garrison, b; Sam Woodyard or Elvin Jones, dr
"Big Nick"	4:25	Duke Ellington and John Coltrane	J. Coltrane	1962-09-26	Van Gelder Studio	Englewood Cliffs, NJ	Rudy Van Gelder		Coltrane, ss, ts; Ellington, p; Aaron Bell or Jimmy Garrison, b; Sam Woodyard or Elvin Jones, dr
"My Little Brown Book"	5:20	Duke Ellington and John Coltrane	B. Strayhorn	1962-09-26	Van Gelder Studio	Englewood Cliffs, NJ	Rudy Van Gelder		Coltrane, ss, ts; Ellington, p; Aaron Bell or Jimmy Garrison, b; Sam Woodyard or Elvin Jones, dr
"The Feeling of Jazz"	5:30	Duke Ellington and John Coltrane	B. Troup-G.Simon-D. Ellington	1962-09-26	Van Gelder Studio	Englewood Cliffs, NJ	Rudy Van Gelder		Coltrane, ss, ts; Ellington, p; Aaron Bell or Jimmy Garrison, b; Sam Woodyard or Elvin Jones, dr
"Take the Coltrane"	4:40	Duke Ellington and John Coltrane	D. Ellington	1962-09-26	Van Gelder Studio	Englewood Cliffs, NJ	Rudy Van Gelder		Coltrane, ss, ts; Ellington, p; Aaron Bell or Jimmy Garrison, b; Sam Woodyard or Elvin Jones, dr
"Too Young to Go Steady"	4:20	John Coltrane Quartet	H. Adamson - J. McHugh	1962-11-13	Van Gelder Studio	Englewood Cliffs, NJ	Rudy Van Gelder		Coltrane, ss, ts; McCoy Tyner, p; Jimmy Garrison, b; Elvin Jones, dr.
"All or Nothing at All"	3:35	John Coltrane Quartet	J. Lawrence - A. Altman	1962-11-13	Van Gelder Studio	Englewood Cliffs, NJ	Rudy Van Gelder		Coltrane, ss, ts; McCoy Tyner, p; Jimmy Garrison, b; Elvin Jones, dr.
"I Wish I Knew"	4:54	John Coltrane Quartet	H. Warner - M. Gordon	1962-11-13	Van Gelder Studio	Englewood Cliffs, NJ	Rudy Van Gelder		Coltrane, ss, ts; McCoy Tyner, p; Jimmy Garrison, b; Elvin Jones, dr.
"They Say It's Wonderful"		John Coltrane Quartet	I. Berlin	1962-11-13	Van Gelder Studio	Englewood Cliffs, NJ	Rudy Van Gelder		Coltrane, ss, ts; McCoy Tyner, p; Jimmy Garrison, b; Elvin Jones, dr.
"You Don't Know What Love Is"	5:11	John Coltrane Quartet	D. Raye - G. DePaul	1962-11-13	Van Gelder Studio	Englewood Cliffs, NJ	Rudy Van Gelder		Coltrane, ss, ts; McCoy Tyner, p; Jimmy Garrison, b; Elvin Jones, dr.
"Say It Over and Over Again"	4:15	John Coltrane Quartet	F. Loesser-J. McHugh	1962-11-13	Van Gelder Studio	Englewood Cliffs, NJ	Rudy Van Gelder		Coltrane, ss, ts; McCoy Tyner, p; Jimmy Garrison, b; Elvin Jones, dr.
"Bye Bye Blackbird"	19:48	John Coltrane Quartet	Dixon - Henderson	1962-11-17	L'Olympia	Paris, France			Coltrane, ss, ts; McCoy Tyner, p; Jimmy Garrison, b; Elvin Jones, dr.
"The Inchworm"	10:17	John Coltrane Quartet	F. Loesser	1962-11-17	L'Olympia	Paris, France			Coltrane, ss, ts; McCoy Tyner, p; Jimmy Garrison, b; Elvin Jones, dr.
"Ev'rytime We Say Goodbye"	4:58	John Coltrane Quartet	C. Porter	1962-11-17	L'Olympia	Paris, France			Coltrane, ss, ts; McCoy Tyner, p; Jimmy Garrison, b; Elvin Jones, dr.
"Mr. P.C."	15:13	John Coltrane Quartet	J. Coltrane	1962-11-17	L'Olympia	Paris, France			Coltrane, ss, ts; McCoy Tyner, p; Jimmy Garrison, b; Elvin Jones, dr.
"Naima"	6:39	John Coltrane Quartet	J. Coltrane	1962-11-17	L'Olympia	Paris, France			Coltrane, ss, ts; McCoy Tyner, p; Jimmy Garrison, b; Elvin Jones, dr.
"Impressions"		John Coltrane Quartet	J. Coltrane	1962-11-17	L'Olympia	Paris, France			Coltrane, ss, ts; McCoy Tyner, p; Jimmy Garrison, b; Elvin Jones, dr.
"Traneing In"	18:26	John Coltrane Quartet	J. Coltrane	1962-11-17	L'Olympia	Paris, France			Coltrane, ss, ts; McCoy Tyner, p; Jimmy Garrison, b; Elvin Jones, dr.
"My Favorite Things"		John Coltrane Quartet	R. Rodgers - O. Hammerstein	1962-11-17	L'Olympia	Paris, France			Coltrane, ss, ts; McCoy Tyner, p; Jimmy Garrison, b; Elvin Jones, dr.
"Bye Bye Blackbird"	14:14	John Coltrane Quartet	Dixon - Henderson	1962-11-19	Koncerthuset	Stockholm, Sweden			Coltrane, ss, ts; McCoy Tyner, p; Jimmy Garrison, b; Elvin Jones, dr.
"The Inchworm"	5:37	John Coltrane Quartet	F. Loesser	1962-11-19	Koncerthuset	Stockholm, Sweden			Coltrane, ss, ts; McCoy Tyner, p; Jimmy Garrison, b; Elvin Jones, dr.
"Mr. P.C."	15:11	John Coltrane Quartet	J. Coltrane	1962-11-19	Koncerthuset	Stockholm, Sweden			Coltrane, ss, ts; McCoy Tyner, p; Jimmy Garrison, b; Elvin Jones, dr.
"Naima"	9:20	John Coltrane Quartet	J. Coltrane	1962-11-19	Koncerthuset	Stockholm, Sweden			Coltrane, ss, ts; McCoy Tyner, p; Jimmy Garrison, b; Elvin Jones, dr.
"Traneing In"	18:40	John Coltrane Quartet	J. Coltrane	1962-11-19	Koncerthuset	Stockholm, Sweden			Coltrane, ss, ts; McCoy Tyner, p; Jimmy Garrison, b; Elvin Jones, dr.
"Impressions"	7:44	John Coltrane Quartet	J. Coltrane	1962-11-19	Koncerthuset	Stockholm, Sweden			Coltrane, ss, ts; McCoy Tyner, p; Jimmy Garrison, b; Elvin Jones, dr.
"My Favorite Things"	21:18	John Coltrane Quartet	R. Rodgers - O. Hammerstein	1962-11-19	Koncerthuset	Stockholm, Sweden			Coltrane, ss, ts; McCoy Tyner, p; Jimmy Garrison, b; Elvin Jones, dr.
"Bye Bye Blackbird"	17:58	John Coltrane Quartet	Dixon - Henderson	1962-11-19	Koncerthuset	Stockholm, Sweden			Coltrane, ss, ts; McCoy Tyner, p; Jimmy Garrison, b; Elvin Jones, dr.
"The Inchworm"	7:04	John Coltrane Quartet	F. Loesser	1962-11-19	Koncerthuset	Stockholm, Sweden			Coltrane, ss, ts; McCoy Tyner, p; Jimmy Garrison, b; Elvin Jones, dr.
"Naima	6:38	John Coltrane Quartet	J. Coltrane	1962-11-19	Koncerthuset	Stockholm, Sweden			Coltrane, ss, ts; McCoy Tyner, p; Jimmy Garrison, b; Elvin Jones, dr.
"I Want to Talk About You"	6:39	John Coltrane Quartet	B. Eckstine	1962-11-19	Koncerthuset	Stockholm, Sweden			Coltrane, ss, ts; McCoy Tyner, p; Jimmy Garrison, b; Elvin Jones, dr.
"Impressions"	7:52	John Coltrane Quartet	J. Coltrane	1962-11-19	Koncerthuset	Stockholm, Sweden			Coltrane, ss, ts; McCoy Tyner, p; Jimmy Garrison, b; Elvin Jones, dr.
"Mr. P.C."	17:50	John Coltrane Quartet	J. Coltrane	1962-11-19	Koncerthuset	Stockholm, Sweden			Coltrane, ss, ts; McCoy Tyner, p; Jimmy Garrison, b; Elvin Jones, dr.
"My Favorite Things"	24:35	John Coltrane Quartet	R. Rodgers - O. Hammerstein	1962-11-19	Koncerthuset	Stockholm, Sweden			Coltrane, ss, ts; McCoy Tyner, p; Jimmy Garrison, b; Elvin Jones, dr.
"Everytime We Say Goodbye"	4:28	John Coltrane Quartet	C. Porter	1962-11-19	Koncerthuset	Stockholm, Sweden			Coltrane, ss, ts; McCoy Tyner, p; Jimmy Garrison, b; Elvin Jones, dr.
Traneing In	16:25	John Coltrane Quartet	J. Coltrane	1962-11-19	Koncerthuset	Stockholm, Sweden			Coltrane, ss, ts;McCoy Tyner, p; Jimmy Garrison, b; Elvin Jones, dr.
"Bye Bye Blackbird"	20:29	John Coltrane Quartet	Dixon - Henderson	1962-11-22	Falkonercentret	Copenhagen, Denmark			Coltrane, ss, ts; McCoy Tyner, p; Jimmy Garrison, b; Elvin Jones, dr.
"Chasin' the Trane"	7:01	John Coltrane Quartet	J. Coltrane	1962-11-22	Falkonercentret	Copenhagen, Denmark			Coltrane, ss, ts; McCoy Tyner, p; Jimmy Garrison, b; Elvin Jones, dr.
"The Inchworm"	9:48	John Coltrane Quartet	F. Loesser	1962-11-22	Falkonercentret	Copenhagen, Denmark			Coltrane, ss, ts; McCoy Tyner, p; Jimmy Garrison, b; Elvin Jones, dr.
"Everytime We Say Goodbye"	5:20	John Coltrane Quartet	C. Porter	1962-11-22	Falkonercentret	Copenhagen, Denmark			Coltrane, ss, ts; McCoy Tyner, p; Jimmy Garrison, b; Elvin Jones, dr.
"Mr. P.C."	18:56	John Coltrane Quartet	J. Coltrane	1962-11-22	Falkonercentret	Copenhagen, Denmark			Coltrane, ss, ts; McCoy Tyner, p; Jimmy Garrison, b; Elvin Jones, dr.
"I Want to Talk About You"	10:39	John Coltrane Quartet	B. Eckstine	1962-11-22	Falkonercentret	Copenhagen, Denmark			Coltrane, ss, ts; McCoy Tyner, p; Jimmy Garrison, b; Elvin Jones, dr.
"Traneing In"	22:50	John Coltrane Quartet	J. Coltrane	1962-11-22	Falkonercentret	Copenhagen, Denmark			Coltrane, ss, ts; McCoy Tyner, p; Jimmy Garrison, b; Elvin Jones, dr.
"Impressions"	8:33	John Coltrane Quartet	J. Coltrane	1962-11-22	Falkonercentret	Copenhagen, Denmark			Coltrane, ss, ts; McCoy Tyner, p; Jimmy Garrison, b; Elvin Jones, dr.
"Bye Bye Blackbird"	23:50	John Coltrane Quartet	Dixon - Henderson	1962-11-28	Stefaniensaal	Graz, Austria			Coltrane, ss, ts;McCoy Tyner, p; Jimmy Garrison, b; Elvin Jones, dr.
"The Inchworm"	11:50	John Coltrane Quartet	F. Loesser	1962-11-28	Stefaniensaal	Graz, Austria			Coltrane, ss, ts;McCoy Tyner, p; Jimmy Garrison, b; Elvin Jones, dr.
"Autumn Leaves"	10:35	John Coltrane Quartet	J. Prevert - J. Kosma	1962-11-28	Stefaniensaal	Graz, Austria			Coltrane, ss, ts; McCoy Tyner, p; Jimmy Garrison, b; Elvin Jones, dr.
"Everytime We Say Goodbye"	5:47	John Coltrane Quartet	C. Porter	1962-11-28	Stefaniensaal	Graz, Austria			Coltrane, ss, ts; McCoy Tyner, p; Jimmy Garrison, b; Elvin Jones, dr.
"Mr. P.C."	17:37	John Coltrane Quartet	J. Coltrane	1962-11-28	Stefaniensaal	Graz, Austria			Coltrane, ss, ts; McCoy Tyner, p; Jimmy Garrison, b; Elvin Jones, dr.
"I Want to Talk About You"	12:24	John Coltrane Quartet	B. Eckstine	1962-11-28	Stefaniensaal	Graz, Austria			Coltrane, ss, ts; McCoy Tyner, p; Jimmy Garrison, b; Elvin Jones, dr.
"Impressions"	20:59	John Coltrane Quartet	J. Coltrane	1962-11-28	Stefaniensaal	Graz, Austria			Coltrane, ss, ts; McCoy Tyner, p; Jimmy Garrison, b; Elvin Jones, dr.
"My Favorite Things"	23:10	John Coltrane Quartet	R. Rodgers - O. Hammerstein	1962-11-28	Stefaniensaal	Graz, Austria			Coltrane, ss, ts; McCoy Tyner, p; Jimmy Garrison, b; Elvin Jones, dr.
"Everytime We Say Goodbye"	4:43	John Coltrane Quartet	C. Porter	1962-12-02	Teatro dell' Arte	Milano, Italy			Coltrane, ss, ts; McCoy Tyner, p; Jimmy Garrison, b; Elvin Jones, dr.
"The Inchworm"	8:16	John Coltrane Quartet	F. Loesser	1962-12-02	Teatro dell' Arte	Milano, Italy			Coltrane, ss, ts; McCoy Tyner, p; Jimmy Garrison, b; Elvin Jones, dr.
"Mr. P.C."	16:27	John Coltrane Quartet	J. Coltrane	1962-12-02	Teatro dell' Arte	Milano, Italy			Coltrane, ss, ts; McCoy Tyner, p; Jimmy Garrison, b; Elvin Jones, dr.
"Chasin' the Trane"	4:15	John Coltrane Quartet	J. Coltrane	1962-12-02	Teatro dell' Arte	Milano, Italy			Coltrane, ss, ts; McCoy Tyner, p; Jimmy Garrison, b; Elvin Jones, dr.
"I Want to Talk About You"	10:23	John Coltrane Quartet	B. Eckstine	1963-02-23	Birdland	New York, NY			Coltrane, ss, ts; McCoy Tyner, p; Jimmy Garrison, b; Elvin Jones, dr.
"One Up and One Down"	14:45	John Coltrane Quartet	J. Coltrane	1963-02-23	Birdland	New York, NY			Coltrane, ss, ts; McCoy Tyner, p; Jimmy Garrison, b; Elvin Jones, dr.
"The Inchworm"	1:44	John Coltrane Quartet	F. Loesser	1963-02-23	Birdland	New York, NY			Coltrane, ss, ts; McCoy Tyner, p; Jimmy Garrison, b; Elvin Jones, dr.
"Mr. P.C."	13:14	John Coltrane Quartet	J. Coltrane	1963-03-02	Birdland	New York, NY			Coltrane, ss, ts; McCoy Tyner, p; Jimmy Garrison, b; Elvin Jones, dr.
"My Favorite Things"	10:24	John Coltrane Quartet	R. Rodgers - O. Hammerstein	1963-03-02	Birdland	New York, NY			Coltrane, ss, ts; McCoy Tyner, p; Jimmy Garrison, b; Elvin Jones, dr.
"Vilia"	4:35	John Coltrane Quartet	F. Lehar	1963-03-06	Van Gelder Studio	Englewood Cliffs, NJ	Rudy Van Gelder		Coltrane, ss, ts; McCoy Tyner, p; Jimmy Garrison, b; Elvin Jones, dr.
Untitled Original		John Coltrane Quartet	J. Coltrane	1963-03-06	Van Gelder Studio	Englewood Cliffs, NJ	Rudy Van Gelder		Coltrane, ss, ts; McCoy Tyner, p; Jimmy Garrison, b; Elvin Jones, dr.
"Nature Boy"		John Coltrane Quartet	E. Ahbez	1963-03-06	Van Gelder Studio	Englewood Cliffs, NJ	Rudy Van Gelder		Coltrane, ss, ts; McCoy Tyner, p; Jimmy Garrison, b; Elvin Jones, dr.
Untitled Original		John Coltrane Quartet	J. Coltrane	1963-03-06	Van Gelder Studio	Englewood Cliffs, NJ	Rudy Van Gelder		Coltrane, ss, ts; McCoy Tyner, p; Jimmy Garrison, b; Elvin Jones, dr.
Untitled Original		John Coltrane Quartet	J. Coltrane	1963-03-06	Van Gelder Studio	Englewood Cliffs, NJ	Rudy Van Gelder		Coltrane, ss, ts; McCoy Tyner, p; Jimmy Garrison, b; Elvin Jones, dr.
Untitled Original		John Coltrane Quartet	J. Coltrane	1963-03-06	Van Gelder Studio	Englewood Cliffs, NJ	Rudy Van Gelder		Coltrane, ss, ts; McCoy Tyner, p; Jimmy Garrison, b; Elvin Jones, dr.
"Slow Blues - Original"		John Coltrane Quartet	J. Coltrane	1963-03-06	Van Gelder Studio	Englewood Cliffs, NJ	Rudy Van Gelder		Coltrane, ss, ts; McCoy Tyner, p; Jimmy Garrison, b; Elvin Jones, dr.
"They Say It's Wonderful"	5:15	John Coltrane Quartet and Johnny Hartman	I. Berlin	1963-03-07	Van Gelder Studio	Englewood Cliffs, NJ	Rudy Van Gelder		Coltrane, ss, ts; McCoy Tyner, p; Jimmy Garrison, b; Elvin Jones, dr., Hartman vcl
"Lush Life"	5:20	John Coltrane Quartet and Johnny Hartman	B. Strayhorn	1963-03-07	Van Gelder Studio	Englewood Cliffs, NJ	Rudy Van Gelder		Coltrane, ss, ts; McCoy Tyner, p; Jimmy Garrison, b; Elvin Jones, dr., Hartman vcl
"My One and Only Love"	4:50	John Coltrane Quartet and Johnny Hartman	Mallin - Wood	1963-03-07	Van Gelder Studio	Englewood Cliffs, NJ	Rudy Van Gelder		Coltrane, ss, ts; McCoy Tyner, p; Jimmy Garrison, b; Elvin Jones, dr., Hartman vcl
"Autumn Leaves"	4:11	John Coltrane Quartet and Johnny Hartman	S. Gallop - P.DeRose	1963-03-07	Van Gelder Studio	Englewood Cliffs, NJ	Rudy Van Gelder		Coltrane, ss, ts; McCoy Tyner, p; Jimmy Garrison, b; Elvin Jones, dr., Hartman vcl
"Dedicated to You"	5:27	John Coltrane Quartet and Johnny Hartman	Cahn - Chaplin	1963-03-07	Van Gelder Studio	Englewood Cliffs, NJ	Rudy Van Gelder		Coltrane, ss, ts; McCoy Tyner, p; Jimmy Garrison, b; Elvin Jones, dr., Hartman vcl
"Afro-Blue"		John Coltrane Quartet and Johnny Hartman	M. Santamaria	1963-03-07	Van Gelder Studio	Englewood Cliffs, NJ	Rudy Van Gelder		Coltrane, ss, ts; McCoy Tyner, p; Jimmy Garrison, b; Elvin Jones, dr., Hartman vcl
"You Are Too Beautiful"	5:32	John Coltrane Quartet and Johnny Hartman	R. Rodgers - L. Hart	1963-03-07	Van Gelder Studio	Englewood Cliffs, NJ	Rudy Van Gelder		Coltrane, ss, ts; McCoy Tyner, p; Jimmy Garrison, b; Elvin Jones, dr., Hartman vcl
"After the Rain"	4:07	John Coltrane Quartet	J. Coltrane	1963-04-29	Van Gelder Studio	Englewood Cliffs, NJ	Rudy Van Gelder		Coltrane, ss, ts; McCoy Tyner, p; Jimmy Garrison, b; Roy Haynes, dr.
"All the Things You Are"		John Coltrane Quartet	J. Coltrane	1963-04-29	Van Gelder Studio	Englewood Cliffs, NJ	Rudy Van Gelder		Coltrane, ss, ts; McCoy Tyner, p; Jimmy Garrison, b; Roy Haynes, dr.
"Dear Old Stockholm"	10:35	John Coltrane Quartet	traditional, arr. J. Coltrane	1963-04-29	Van Gelder Studio	Englewood Cliffs, NJ	Rudy Van Gelder		Coltrane, ss, ts; McCoy Tyner, p; Jimmy Garrison, b; Roy Haynes, dr.
"I Want to Talk About You"	8:17	John Coltrane Quartet	B. Eckstine	1963-07-07	Newport Jazz Festival	Newport, RI			Coltrane, ss, ts; McCoy Tyner, p; Jimmy Garrison, b; Roy Haynes, dr.
"My Favorite Things"	17:31	John Coltrane Quartet	R. Rodgers - L. Hart	1963-07-07	Newport Jazz Festival	Newport, RI			Coltrane, ss, ts; McCoy Tyner, p; Jimmy Garrison, b; Roy Haynes, dr.
"Impressions"	15:52	John Coltrane Quartet	J. Coltrane	1963-07-07	Newport Jazz Festival	Newport, RI			Coltrane, ss, ts; McCoy Tyner, p; Jimmy Garrison, b; Roy Haynes, dr.
"Rockin'"		John Coltrane Quartet	J. Coltrane	1963-10-08	Birdland	New York, NY	Rudy Van Gelder		Coltrane, ss, ts; McCoy Tyner, p; Jimmy Garrison, b; Elvin Jones, dr.
"Mr. P.C."		John Coltrane Quartet	J. Coltrane	1963-10-08	Birdland	New York, NY	Rudy Van Gelder		Coltrane, ss, ts; McCoy Tyner, p; Jimmy Garrison, b; Elvin Jones, dr.
"Lonnie's Lament"		John Coltrane Quartet	J. Coltrane	1963-10-08	Birdland	New York, NY	Rudy Van Gelder		Coltrane, ss, ts; McCoy Tyner, p; Jimmy Garrison, b; Elvin Jones, dr.
"The Promise"	8:04	John Coltrane Quartet	J. Coltrane	1963-10-08	Birdland	New York, NY	Rudy Van Gelder		Coltrane, ss, ts; McCoy Tyner, p; Jimmy Garrison, b; Elvin Jones, dr.
"I Want to Talk About You"	8:05	John Coltrane Quartet	B. Eckstine	1963-10-08	Birdland	New York, NY	Rudy Van Gelder		Coltrane, ss, ts; McCoy Tyner, p; Jimmy Garrison, b; Elvin Jones, dr.
"Afro-Blue"	10:40	John Coltrane Quartet	M. Santamaria	1963-10-08	Birdland	New York, NY	Rudy Van Gelder		Coltrane, ss, ts; McCoy Tyner, p; Jimmy Garrison, b; Elvin Jones, dr.
"Traneing In"	11:40	John Coltrane Quartet	J. Coltrane	1963-10-22	Koncerthuset	Stockholm, Sweden			Coltrane, ss, ts; McCoy Tyner, p; Jimmy Garrison, b; Elvin Jones, dr.
"Mr. P.C."	18:26	John Coltrane Quartet	J. Coltrane	1963-10-22	Koncerthuset	Stockholm, Sweden			Coltrane, ss, ts; McCoy Tyner, p; Jimmy Garrison, b; Elvin Jones, dr.
"Naima"	6:45	John Coltrane Quartet	J. Coltrane	1963-10-22	Koncerthuset	Stockholm, Sweden			Coltrane, ss, ts; McCoy Tyner, p; Jimmy Garrison, b; Elvin Jones, dr.
"The Promise"	6:55	John Coltrane Quartet	J. Coltrane	1963-10-22	Koncerthuset	Stockholm, Sweden			Coltrane, ss, ts; McCoy Tyner, p; Jimmy Garrison, b; Elvin Jones, dr.
"Spiritual"	11:21	John Coltrane Quartet	J. Coltrane	1963-10-22	Koncerthuset	Stockholm, Sweden			Coltrane, ss, ts;McCoy Tyner, p; Jimmy Garrison, b; Elvin Jones, dr.
"Impressions"	11:15	John Coltrane Quartet	J. Coltrane	1963-10-22	Koncerthuset	Stockholm, Sweden			Coltrane, ss, ts; McCoy Tyner, p; Jimmy Garrison, b; Elvin Jones, dr.
"I Want to Talk About You"	9:09	John Coltrane Quartet	B. Eckstine	1963-10-22	Koncerthuset	Stockholm, Sweden			Coltrane, ss, ts; McCoy Tyner, p; Jimmy Garrison, b; Elvin Jones, dr.
"My Favorite Things"	13:56	John Coltrane Quartet	R. Rodgers - O. Hammerstein	1963-10-22	Koncerthuset	Stockholm, Sweden			Coltrane, ss, ts; McCoy Tyner, p; Jimmy Garrison, b; Elvin Jones, dr.
"Mr. P.C."	23:27	John Coltrane Quartet	J. Coltrane	1963-10-25	Tivolis Koncertsal	Copenhagen, Denmark			Coltrane, ss, ts; McCoy Tyner, p; Jimmy Garrison, b; Elvin Jones, dr.
"Impressions" (incomplete)	19:30	John Coltrane Quartet	J. Coltrane	1963-10-25	Tivolis Koncertsal	Copenhagen, Denmark			Coltrane, ss, ts; McCoy Tyner, p; Jimmy Garrison, b; Elvin Jones, dr.
"The Promise"	10:00	John Coltrane Quartet	J. Coltrane	1963-10-25	Tivolis Koncertsal	Copenhagen, Denmark			Coltrane, ss, ts; McCoy Tyner, p; Jimmy Garrison, b; Elvin Jones, dr.
"Afro-Blue"	8:40	John Coltrane Quartet	M. Santamaria	1963-10-25	Tivolis Koncertsal	Copenhagen, Denmark			Coltrane, ss, ts; McCoy Tyner, p; Jimmy Garrison, b; Elvin Jones, dr.
"Naima"	7:32	John Coltrane Quartet	J. Coltrane	1963-10-25	Tivolis Koncertsal	Copenhagen, Denmark			Coltrane, ss, ts; McCoy Tyner, p; Jimmy Garrison, b; Elvin Jones, dr.
"My Favorite Things"	17:13	John Coltrane Quartet	R. Rodgers - O. Hammerstein	1963-10-25	Tivolis Koncertsal	Copenhagen, Denmark			Coltrane, ss, ts; McCoy Tyner, p; Jimmy Garrison, b; Elvin Jones, dr.
"Afro-Blue"		John Coltrane Quartet	M. Santamaria	1963-11-01	Salle Pleyel	Paris, France			Coltrane, ss, ts; McCoy Tyner, p; Jimmy Garrison, b; Elvin Jones, dr.
Unknown Title		John Coltrane Quartet		1963-11-01	Salle Pleyel	Paris, France			Coltrane, ss, ts; McCoy Tyner, p; Jimmy Garrison, b; Elvin Jones, dr.
"I Want to Talk About You"		John Coltrane Quartet	B. Eckstine	1963-11-01	Salle Pleyel	Paris, France			Coltrane, ss, ts; McCoy Tyner, p; Jimmy Garrison, b; Elvin Jones, dr.
"Impressions"	22:07	John Coltrane Quartet	J. Coltrane	1963-11-01	Salle Pleyel	Paris, France			Coltrane, ss, ts; McCoy Tyner, p; Jimmy Garrison, b; Elvin Jones, dr.
"My Favorite Things"	24:20	John Coltrane Quartet	R. Rodgers - O. Hammerstein	1963-11-01	Salle Pleyel	Paris, France			Coltrane, ss, ts; McCoy Tyner, p; Jimmy Garrison, b; Elvin Jones, dr.
"Ev'rytime We Say Goodbye"	5:37	John Coltrane Quartet	C. Porter	1963-11-01	Salle Pleyel	Paris, France			Coltrane, ss, ts; McCoy Tyner, p; Jimmy Garrison, b; Elvin Jones, dr.
"Mr. P.C."	26:28	John Coltrane Quartet	J. Coltrane	1963-11-01	Salle Pleyel	Paris, France			Coltrane, ss, ts; McCoy Tyner, p; Jimmy Garrison, b; Elvin Jones, dr.
"Lonnie's Lament"	10:02	John Coltrane Quartet	J. Coltrane	1963-11-02	Auditorium Maximum, Freie Universität	Berlin, Germany			Coltrane, ss, ts;McCoy Tyner, p; Jimmy Garrison, b; Elvin Jones, dr.
"Naima"	7:55	John Coltrane Quartet	J. Coltrane	1963-11-02	Auditorium Maximum, Freie Universität	Berlin, Germany			Coltrane, ss, ts;McCoy Tyner, p; Jimmy Garrison, b; Elvin Jones, dr.
"Chasin' the Trane"	5:41	John Coltrane Quartet	J. Coltrane	1963-11-02	Auditorium Maximum, Freie Universität	Berlin, Germany			Coltrane, ss, ts;McCoy Tyner, p; Jimmy Garrison, b; Elvin Jones, dr.
"My Favorite Things"	21:35	John Coltrane Quartet	R. Rodgers - O. Hammerstein	1963-11-02	Auditorium Maximum, Freie Universität	Berlin, Germany			Coltrane, ss, ts; McCoy Tyner, p; Jimmy Garrison, b; Elvin Jones, dr.
"Afro-Blue"	7:37	John Coltrane Quartet	M. Santamaria	1963-11-02	Auditorium Maximum, Freie Universität	Berlin, Germany			Coltrane, ss, ts; McCoy Tyner, p; Jimmy Garrison, b; Elvin Jones, dr.
Cousin Mary	9:52	John Coltrane Quartet	J. Coltrane	1963-11-02	Auditorium Maximum, Freie Universität	Berlin, Germany			Coltrane, ss, ts; McCoy Tyner, p; Jimmy Garrison, b; Elvin Jones, dr.
"I Want to Talk About You"	8:12	John Coltrane Quartet	B. Eckstine	1963-11-02	Auditorium Maximum, Freie Universität	Berlin, Germany			Coltrane, ss, ts; McCoy Tyner, p; Jimmy Garrison, b; Elvin Jones, dr.
"The Promise"	7:33	John Coltrane Quartet	J. Coltrane	1963-11-04	Liederhalle	Stuttgart, Germany			Coltrane, ss, ts; McCoy Tyner, p; Jimmy Garrison, b; Elvin Jones, dr.
"Afro-Blue"	6:43	John Coltrane Quartet	M. Santamaria	1963-11-04	Liederhalle	Stuttgart, Germany			Coltrane, ss, ts; McCoy Tyner, p; Jimmy Garrison, b; Elvin Jones, dr.
"I Want to Talk About You"	10:55	John Coltrane Quartet	B. Eckstine	1963-11-04	Liederhalle	Stuttgart, Germany			Coltrane, ss, ts; McCoy Tyner, p; Jimmy Garrison, b; Elvin Jones, dr.
"Impressions"	29:10	John Coltrane Quartet	J. Coltrane	1963-11-04	Liederhalle	Stuttgart, Germany			Coltrane, ss, ts; McCoy Tyner, p; Jimmy Garrison, b; Elvin Jones, dr.
"My Favorite Things"	19:19	John Coltrane Quartet	R. Rodgers - O. Hammerstein	1963-11-04	Liederhalle	Stuttgart, Germany			Coltrane, ss, ts; McCoy Tyner, p; Jimmy Garrison, b; Elvin Jones, dr.
"Ev'rytime We Say Goodbye"	6:25	John Coltrane Quartet	C. Porter	1963-11-04	Liederhalle	Stuttgart, Germany			Coltrane, ss, ts; McCoy Tyner, p; Jimmy Garrison, b; Elvin Jones, dr.
"Mr. P.C."	35:32	John Coltrane Quartet	J. Coltrane	1963-11-04	Liederhalle	Stuttgart, Germany			Coltrane, ss, ts; McCoy Tyner, p; Jimmy Garrison, b; Elvin Jones, dr.
"Your Lady"	6:35	John Coltrane Quartet	J. Coltrane	1963-11-18	Van Gelder Studio	Englewood Cliffs, NJ	Rudy Van Gelder		Coltrane, ss, ts; McCoy Tyner, p; Jimmy Garrison, b; Elvin Jones, dr.
Alabama	5:05	John Coltrane Quartet	J. Coltrane	1963-11-18	Van Gelder Studio	Englewood Cliffs, NJ	Rudy Van Gelder		Coltrane, ss, ts; McCoy Tyner, p; Jimmy Garrison, b; Elvin Jones, dr.
"Alabama"	2:23	John Coltrane Quartet	J. Coltrane	1963-11-18	Van Gelder Studio	Englewood Cliffs, NJ	Rudy Van Gelder		Coltrane, ss, ts; McCoy Tyner, p; Jimmy Garrison, b; Elvin Jones, dr.
"Afro-Blue"	7:10	John Coltrane Quartet	M. Santamaria	1963-12-07	KQED-TV studios	San Francisco, CA			Coltrane, ss, ts; McCoy Tyner, p; Jimmy Garrison, b; Elvin Jones, dr.
"Alabama"	5:48	John Coltrane Quartet	J. Coltrane	1963-12-07	KQED-TV studios	San Francisco, CA			Coltrane, ss, ts; McCoy Tyner, p; Jimmy Garrison, b; Elvin Jones, dr.
"Impressions" (incomplete)	14:10	John Coltrane Quartet	J. Coltrane	1963-12-07	KQED-TV studios	San Francisco, CA			Coltrane, ss, ts; McCoy Tyner, p; Jimmy Garrison, b; Elvin Jones, dr.
"Crescent"	10:04	John Coltrane Quartet	J. Coltrane	1964-04-27	Van Gelder Studio	Englewood Cliffs, NJ	Rudy Van Gelder		Coltrane, ss, ts; McCoy Tyner, p; Jimmy Garrison, b; Elvin Jones, dr.
"Lonnie's Lament"	11:42	John Coltrane Quartet	J. Coltrane	1964-04-27	Van Gelder Studio	Englewood Cliffs, NJ	Rudy Van Gelder		Coltrane, ss, ts;McCoy Tyner, p; Jimmy Garrison, b; Elvin Jones, dr.
"The Drum Thing"	7:20	John Coltrane Quartet	J. Coltrane	1964-04-27	Van Gelder Studio	Englewood Cliffs, NJ	Rudy Van Gelder		Coltrane, ss, ts; McCoy Tyner, p; Jimmy Garrison, b; Elvin Jones, dr.
"Wise One"	9:01	John Coltrane Quartet	J. Coltrane	1964-04-27	Van Gelder Studio	Englewood Cliffs, NJ	Rudy Van Gelder		Coltrane, ss, ts; McCoy Tyner, p; Jimmy Garrison, b; Elvin Jones, dr.
"Bessie's Blues"	2:58	John Coltrane Quartet	J. Coltrane	1964-04-27	Van Gelder Studio	Englewood Cliffs, NJ	Rudy Van Gelder		Coltrane, ss, ts; McCoy Tyner, p; Jimmy Garrison, b; Elvin Jones, dr.
"Song of Praise"	2:41	John Coltrane Quartet	J. Coltrane	1964-04-27	Van Gelder Studio	Englewood Cliffs, NJ	Rudy Van Gelder		Coltrane, ss, ts; McCoy Tyner, p; Jimmy Garrison, b; Elvin Jones, dr.
"Crescent"	8:40	John Coltrane Quartet	J. Coltrane	1964-06-01	Van Gelder Studio	Englewood Cliffs, NJ	Rudy Van Gelder		Coltrane, ss, ts; McCoy Tyner, p; Jimmy Garrison, b; Elvin Jones, dr.
"Bessie's Blues"	3:30	John Coltrane Quartet	J. Coltrane	1964-06-01	Van Gelder Studio	Englewood Cliffs, NJ	Rudy Van Gelder		Coltrane, ss, ts; McCoy Tyner, p; Jimmy Garrison, b; Elvin Jones, dr.
"Part I Acknowledgement"	7:39	John Coltrane Quartet	J. Coltrane	1964-12-09	Van Gelder Studio	Englewood Cliffs, NJ	Rudy Van Gelder		Coltrane, ss, ts; McCoy Tyner, p; Jimmy Garrison, b; Elvin Jones, dr.
"Part II Resolution"	7:21	John Coltrane Quartet	J. Coltrane	1964-12-09	Van Gelder Studio	Englewood Cliffs, NJ	Rudy Van Gelder		Coltrane, ss, ts; McCoy Tyner, p; Jimmy Garrison, b; Elvin Jones, dr.
"Part II Resolution"	7:15	John Coltrane Quartet	J. Coltrane	1964-12-09	Van Gelder Studio	Englewood Cliffs, NJ	Rudy Van Gelder		Coltrane, ss, ts; McCoy Tyner, p; Jimmy Garrison, b; Elvin Jones, dr.
"Part III Pursuance"	10:40	John Coltrane Quartet	J. Coltrane	1964-12-09	Van Gelder Studio	Englewood Cliffs, NJ	Rudy Van Gelder		Coltrane, ss, ts; McCoy Tyner, p; Jimmy Garrison, b; Elvin Jones, dr.
"Part IV Psalm"	7:00	John Coltrane Quartet	J. Coltrane	1964-12-09	Van Gelder Studio	Englewood Cliffs, NJ	Rudy Van Gelder		Coltrane, ss, ts; McCoy Tyner, p; Jimmy Garrison, b; Elvin Jones, dr.
"Part I Acknowledgement"		John Coltrane Quartet	J. Coltrane	1964-12-10	Van Gelder Studio	Englewood Cliffs, NJ	Rudy Van Gelder		Coltrane, ss, ts; McCoy Tyner, p; Jimmy Garrison, b; Elvin Jones, dr.
"Part II Resolution"		John Coltrane Quartet	J. Coltrane	1964-12-10	Van Gelder Studio	Englewood Cliffs, NJ	Rudy Van Gelder		Coltrane, ss, ts; McCoy Tyner, p; Jimmy Garrison, b; Elvin Jones, dr.
"Nature Boy"	6:52	John Coltrane Quintet	E. Ahbez	1965-02-17	Van Gelder Studio	Englewood Cliffs, NJ	Rudy Van Gelder		Coltrane, ss, ts; McCoy Tyner, p; Jimmy Garrison, Art Davis, b; Elvin Jones, dr.
"Feelin' Good"		John Coltrane Quintet	L. Bricusse - A. Newley	1965-02-17	Van Gelder Studio	Englewood Cliffs, NJ	Rudy Van Gelder		Coltrane, ss, ts; McCoy Tyner, p; Jimmy Garrison, Art Davis, b; Elvin Jones, dr.
"Chim Chim Cheree"		John Coltrane Quintet	R. Sherman - R. Sherman	1965-02-17	Van Gelder Studio	Englewood Cliffs, NJ	Rudy Van Gelder	Davis does not play on	Coltrane, ss, ts; McCoy Tyner, p; Jimmy Garrison, Art Davis, b; Elvin Jones, dr.
"Nature Boy"	8:02	John Coltrane Quintet	E. Ahbez	1965-02-18	Van Gelder Studio	Englewood Cliffs, NJ	Rudy Van Gelder		Coltrane, ss, ts; McCoy Tyner, p; Jimmy Garrison, Art Davis, b; Elvin Jones, dr.
"Feelin' Good"	5:52	John Coltrane Quintet	L. Bricusse - A. Newley	1965-02-18	Van Gelder Studio	Englewood Cliffs, NJ	Rudy Van Gelder		Coltrane, ss, ts; McCoy Tyner, p; Jimmy Garrison, Art Davis, b; Elvin Jones, dr.
"Feelin' Good"	6:20	John Coltrane Quintet	L. Bricusse - A. Newley	1965-02-18	Van Gelder Studio	Englewood Cliffs, NJ	Rudy Van Gelder		Coltrane, ss, ts; McCoy Tyner, p; Jimmy Garrison, Art Davis, b; Elvin Jones, dr.
"Chim Chim Cheree"	20:16	John Coltrane Quartet	R. Sherman - R. Sherman	1965-03-19	Half Note	New York, NY			Coltrane, ss, ts; McCoy Tyner, p; Jimmy Garrison, b; Elvin Jones, dr.
"Impressions"	21:58	John Coltrane Quartet	J. Coltrane	1965-03-19	Half Note	New York, NY			Coltrane, ss, ts; McCoy Tyner, p; Jimmy Garrison, b; Elvin Jones, dr.
"One Down, One Up"	27:40	John Coltrane Quartet	J. Coltrane	1965-03-26	Half Note	New York, NY			Coltrane, ss, ts; McCoy Tyner, p; Jimmy Garrison, b; Elvin Jones, dr.
"Afro Blue"	12:44	John Coltrane Quartet	M. Santamaria	1965-03-26	Half Note	New York, NY			Coltrane, ss, ts; McCoy Tyner, p; Jimmy Garrison, b; Elvin Jones, dr.
"Nature Boy"	7:54	John Coltrane Quartet	E. Ahbez	1965-03-28	Village Gate	New York, NY			Coltrane, ss, ts; McCoy Tyner, p; Jimmy Garrison, b; Elvin Jones, dr.
"Bass Solo"		John Coltrane Quartet	J. Garrison	1965-03-28	Village Gate	New York, NY			Coltrane, ss, ts; McCoy Tyner, p; Jimmy Garrison, b; Elvin Jones, dr.
"One Down, One Up"		John Coltrane Quartet	J. Coltrane	1965-03-28	Village Gate	New York, NY			Coltrane, ss, ts; McCoy Tyner, p; Jimmy Garrison, b; Elvin Jones, dr.
Untitled Original	23:11	John Coltrane Quartet	J. Coltrane	1965-04-02	Half Note	New York, NY			Coltrane, ss, ts; McCoy Tyner, p; Jimmy Garrison, b; Elvin Jones, dr.
"I Want to Talk About You"	15:26	John Coltrane Quartet	B. Eckstine	1965-04-02	Half Note	New York, NY			Coltrane, ss, ts; McCoy Tyner, p; Jimmy Garrison, b; Elvin Jones, dr.
"Afro-Blue"	5:40	John Coltrane Quartet	M. Santamaria	1965-04-02	Half Note	New York, NY			Coltrane, ss, ts; McCoy Tyner, p; Jimmy Garrison, b; Elvin Jones, dr.
"Song of Praise"	19:39	John Coltrane Quartet	J. Coltrane	1965-05-07	Half Note	New York, NY			Coltrane, ss, ts; McCoy Tyner, p; Jimmy Garrison, b; Elvin Jones, dr.
"My Favorite Things"	22:47	John Coltrane Quartet	R. Rodgers - O. Hammerstein	1965-05-07	Half Note	New York, NY			Coltrane, ss, ts; McCoy Tyner, p; Jimmy Garrison, b; Elvin Jones, dr.
"Chim Chim Cheree"	6:56	John Coltrane Quartet	R. Sherman - R. Sherman	1965-05-17	Van Gelder Studio	Englewood Cliffs, NJ	Rudy Van Gelder		Coltrane, ss, ts; McCoy Tyner, p; Jimmy Garrison, b; Elvin Jones, dr.
"Brasilia"	12:56	John Coltrane Quartet	J. Coltrane	1965-05-17	Van Gelder Studio	Englewood Cliffs, NJ	Rudy Van Gelder		Coltrane, ss, ts; McCoy Tyner, p; Jimmy Garrison, b; Elvin Jones, dr.
"Song of Praise"	9:49	John Coltrane Quartet	J. Coltrane	1965-05-17	Van Gelder Studio	Englewood Cliffs, NJ	Rudy Van Gelder		Coltrane, ss, ts; McCoy Tyner, p; Jimmy Garrison, b; Elvin Jones, dr.
"After The Crescent"	13:34	John Coltrane Quartet	J. Coltrane	1965-05-26	Van Gelder Studio	Englewood Cliffs, NJ	Rudy Van Gelder		Coltrane, ss, ts; McCoy Tyner, p; Jimmy Garrison, b; Roy Haynes, dr.
"Dear Lord"	7:41	John Coltrane Quartet	J. Coltrane	1965-05-26	Van Gelder Studio	Englewood Cliffs, NJ	Rudy Van Gelder		Coltrane, ss, ts; McCoy Tyner, p; Jimmy Garrison, b; Roy Haynes, dr.
"Dear Lord"	5:31	John Coltrane Quartet	J. Coltrane	1965-05-26	Van Gelder Studio	Englewood Cliffs, NJ	Rudy Van Gelder		Coltrane, ss, ts; McCoy Tyner, p; Jimmy Garrison, b; Roy Haynes, dr.
"One Down, One Up"	15:25	John Coltrane Quartet	J. Coltrane	1965-05-26	Van Gelder Studio	Englewood Cliffs, NJ	Rudy Van Gelder		Coltrane, ss, ts; McCoy Tyner, p; Jimmy Garrison, b; Roy Haynes, dr.
"Welcome"		John Coltrane Quartet	J. Coltrane	1965-05-26	Van Gelder Studio	Englewood Cliffs, NJ	Rudy Van Gelder		Coltrane, ss, ts; McCoy Tyner, p; Jimmy Garrison, b; Roy Haynes, dr.
"Welcome"	5:17	John Coltrane Quartet	J. Coltrane	1965-06-10	Van Gelder Studio	Englewood Cliffs, NJ	Rudy Van Gelder		Coltrane, ss, ts; McCoy Tyner, p; Jimmy Garrison, b; Elvin Jones, dr.
"The Last Blues"	4:22	John Coltrane Quartet	J. Coltrane	1965-06-10	Van Gelder Studio	Englewood Cliffs, NJ	Rudy Van Gelder		Coltrane, ss, ts; McCoy Tyner, p; Jimmy Garrison, b; Elvin Jones, dr.
Untitled Original	14:40	John Coltrane Quartet	J. Coltrane	1965-06-10	Van Gelder Studio	Englewood Cliffs, NJ	Rudy Van Gelder		Coltrane, ss, ts; McCoy Tyner, p; Jimmy Garrison, b; Elvin Jones, dr.
"Transition"	15:29	John Coltrane Quartet	J. Coltrane	1965-06-10	Van Gelder Studio	Englewood Cliffs, NJ	Rudy Van Gelder		Coltrane, ss, ts; McCoy Tyner, p; Jimmy Garrison, b; Elvin Jones, dr.
"Suite"	21:14	John Coltrane Quartet	J. Coltrane	1965-06-10	Van Gelder Studio	Englewood Cliffs, NJ	Rudy Van Gelder		Coltrane, ss, ts; McCoy Tyner, p; Jimmy Garrison, b; Elvin Jones, dr.
"Living Space"	14:02	John Coltrane Quartet	J. Coltrane	1965-06-16	Van Gelder Studio	Englewood Cliffs, NJ	Rudy Van Gelder		Coltrane, ss, ts; McCoy Tyner, p; Jimmy Garrison, b; Elvin Jones, dr
"Living Space"	10:20	John Coltrane Quartet	J. Coltrane	1965-06-16	Van Gelder Studio	Englewood Cliffs, NJ	Rudy Van Gelder		Coltrane, ss, ts; McCoy Tyner, p; Jimmy Garrison, b; Elvin Jones, dr
"Dusk Dawn"		John Coltrane Quartet	J. Coltrane	1965-06-16	Van Gelder Studio	Englewood Cliffs, NJ	Rudy Van Gelder		Coltrane, ss, ts; McCoy Tyner, p; Jimmy Garrison, b; Elvin Jones, dr
"Dusk Dawn"	10:45	John Coltrane Quartet	J. Coltrane	1965-06-16	Van Gelder Studio	Englewood Cliffs, NJ	Rudy Van Gelder		Coltrane, ss, ts; McCoy Tyner, p; Jimmy Garrison, b; Elvin Jones, dr
"Vigil"		John Coltrane Quartet	J. Coltrane	1965-06-16	Van Gelder Studio	Englewood Cliffs, NJ	Rudy Van Gelder		Coltrane, ss, ts; McCoy Tyner, p; Jimmy Garrison, b; Elvin Jones, dr
"Vigil"	9:36	John Coltrane Quartet	J. Coltrane	1965-06-16	Van Gelder Studio	Englewood Cliffs, NJ	Rudy Van Gelder		Coltrane, ss, ts; McCoy Tyner, p; Jimmy Garrison, b; Elvin Jones, dr
Untitled Original	10:44	John Coltrane Quartet	J. Coltrane	1965-06-16	Van Gelder Studio	Englewood Cliffs, NJ	Rudy Van Gelder		Coltrane, ss, ts; McCoy Tyner, p; Jimmy Garrison, b; Elvin Jones, dr
"Ascension Ed. I Pt. 1"	18:55	John Coltrane Orchestra	J. Coltrane	1965-06-28	Van Gelder Studio	Englewood Cliffs, NJ	Rudy Van Gelder		Freddie Hubbard, Dewey Johnson, tp; John Tchicai, Marion Brown, as; Coltrane, Pharoah Sanders, Archie Shepp,. ts; McCoy Tyner, p; Art Davis, Jimmy Garrison, b; Elvin Jones, dr.
"Ascension Ed. I Pt. 2"	19:42	John Coltrane Orchestra	J. Coltrane	1965-06-28	Van Gelder Studio	Englewood Cliffs, NJ	Rudy Van Gelder		Freddie Hubbard, Dewey Johnson, tp; John Tchicai, Marion Brown, as; Coltrane, Pharoah Sanders, Archie Shepp,. ts; McCoy Tyner, p; Art Davis, Jimmy Garrison, b; Elvin Jones, dr.
"Ascension Ed. II Pt. 1"	18:35	John Coltrane Orchestra	J. Coltrane	1965-06-28	Van Gelder Studio	Englewood Cliffs, NJ	Rudy Van Gelder		Freddie Hubbard, Dewey Johnson, tp; John Tchicai, Marion Brown, as; Coltrane, Pharoah Sanders, Archie Shepp,. ts; McCoy Tyner, p; Art Davis, Jimmy Garrison, b; Elvin Jones, dr.
"Ascension Ed. II Pt. 2"	19:55	John Coltrane Orchestra	J. Coltrane	1965-06-28	Van Gelder Studio	Englewood Cliffs, NJ	Rudy Van Gelder		Freddie Hubbard, Dewey Johnson, tp; John Tchicai, Marion Brown, as; Coltrane, Pharoah Sanders, Archie Shepp,. ts; McCoy Tyner, p; Art Davis, Jimmy Garrison, b; Elvin Jones, dr.
"One Down, One Up"	12:42	John Coltrane Quartet	J. Coltrane	1965-07-02	Newport Jazz Festival	Newport, RI			Coltrane, ss, ts; McCoy Tyner, p; Jimmy Garrison, b; Elvin Jones, dr.
"My Favorite Things"	14:44	John Coltrane Quartet	R. Rodgers - O. Hammerstein	1965-07-02	Newport Jazz Festival	Newport, RI			Coltrane, ss, ts; McCoy Tyner, p; Jimmy Garrison, b; Elvin Jones, dr.
"Part I Acknowledgement"		John Coltrane Quartet	J. Coltrane	1965-07-26	Juan-Les-Pins Jazz Festival	Antibes, France			Coltrane, ss, ts; McCoy Tyner, p; Jimmy Garrison, b; Elvin Jones, dr.
"Part II Resolution"		John Coltrane Quartet	J. Coltrane	1965-07-26	Juan-Les-Pins Jazz Festival	Antibes, France			Coltrane, ss, ts; McCoy Tyner, p; Jimmy Garrison, b; Elvin Jones, dr.
"Part III Pursuance"		John Coltrane Quartet	J. Coltrane	1965-07-26	Juan-Les-Pins Jazz Festival	Antibes, France			Coltrane, ss, ts; McCoy Tyner, p; Jimmy Garrison, b; Elvin Jones, dr.
"Part IV Psalm"		John Coltrane Quartet	J. Coltrane	1965-07-26	Juan-Les-Pins Jazz Festival	Antibes, France			Coltrane, ss, ts; McCoy Tyner, p; Jimmy Garrison, b; Elvin Jones, dr.
"Naima"	7:08	John Coltrane Quartet	J. Coltrane	1965-07-27	Juan-Les-Pins Jazz Festival	Antibes, France			Coltrane, ss, ts; McCoy Tyner, p; Jimmy Garrison, b; Elvin Jones, dr.
"Blue Valse"	15:00	John Coltrane Quartet	J. Coltrane	1965-07-27	Juan-Les-Pins Jazz Festival	Antibes, France			Coltrane, ss, ts; McCoy Tyner, p; Jimmy Garrison, b; Elvin Jones, dr.
"My Favorite Things"	17:40	John Coltrane Quartet	R. Rodgers - O. Hammerstein	1965-07-27	Juan-Les-Pins Jazz Festival	Antibes, France			Coltrane, ss, ts; McCoy Tyner, p; Jimmy Garrison, b; Elvin Jones, dr.
"Impressions"	21:10	John Coltrane Quartet	J. Coltrane	1965-07-27	Juan-Les-Pins Jazz Festival	Antibes, France			Coltrane, ss, ts; McCoy Tyner, p; Jimmy Garrison, b; Elvin Jones, dr.
"Afro-Blue"	10:58	John Coltrane Quartet	M. Santamaria	1965-07-28	Salle Pleyel	Paris, France			Coltrane, ss, ts; McCoy Tyner, p; Jimmy Garrison, b; Elvin Jones, dr.
"Impressions"	16:17	John Coltrane Quartet	J. Coltrane	1965-07-28	Salle Pleyel	Paris, France			Coltrane, ss, ts; McCoy Tyner, p; Jimmy Garrison, b; Elvin Jones, dr.
"Blue Valse" (incomplete)	22:47	John Coltrane Quartet	J. Coltrane	1965-07-28	Salle Pleyel	Paris, France			Coltrane, ss, ts; McCoy Tyner, p; Jimmy Garrison, b; Elvin Jones, dr.
Untitled Original	9:09	John Coltrane Quartet	J. Coltrane	1965-08-01		Comblain-La-Tour, Belgium			Coltrane, ss, ts; McCoy Tyner, p; Jimmy Garrison, b; Elvin Jones, dr.
"Naima"	7:29	John Coltrane Quartet	J. Coltrane	1965-08-01		Comblain-La-Tour, Belgium			Coltrane, ss, ts; McCoy Tyner, p; Jimmy Garrison, b; Elvin Jones, dr.
"My Favorite Things"	21:10	John Coltrane Quartet	R. Rodgers - O. Hammerstein	1965-08-01		Comblain-La-Tour, Belgium			Coltrane, ss, ts; McCoy Tyner, p; Jimmy Garrison, b; Elvin Jones, dr.
"Dearly Beloved"	6:27	John Coltrane Quartet	J. Coltrane	1965-08-26	RCA-Victor Studios	New York, NY			Coltrane, ss, ts; McCoy Tyner, p; Jimmy Garrison, b; Elvin Jones, dr.
"Attaining"	11:26	John Coltrane Quartet	J. Coltrane	1965-08-26	RCA-Victor Studios	New York, NY			Coltrane, ss, ts; McCoy Tyner, p; Jimmy Garrison, b; Elvin Jones, dr.
"Sunship"	6:12	John Coltrane Quartet	J. Coltrane	1965-08-26	RCA-Victor Studios	New York, NY			Coltrane, ss, ts; McCoy Tyner, p; Jimmy Garrison, b; Elvin Jones, dr.
"Ascent"	10:10	John Coltrane Quartet	J. Coltrane	1965-08-26	RCA-Victor Studios	New York, NY			Coltrane, ss, ts; McCoy Tyner, p; Jimmy Garrison, b; Elvin Jones, dr.
"Amen"	8:16	John Coltrane Quartet	J. Coltrane	1965-08-26	RCA-Victor Studios	New York, NY			Coltrane, ss, ts; McCoy Tyner, p; Jimmy Garrison, b; Elvin Jones, dr.
"Love"	8:00	John Coltrane Quartet	J. Coltrane	1965-09-02	Van Gelder Studio	Englewood Cliffs, NJ	Rudy Van Gelder		Coltrane, ss, ts; McCoy Tyner, p; Jimmy Garrison, b; Elvin Jones, dr.
"Compassion"	8:30	John Coltrane Quartet	J. Coltrane	1965-09-02	Van Gelder Studio	Englewood Cliffs, NJ	Rudy Van Gelder		Coltrane, ss, ts; McCoy Tyner, p; Jimmy Garrison, b; Elvin Jones, dr.
"Joy"	8:53	John Coltrane Quartet	J. Coltrane	1965-09-02	Van Gelder Studio	Englewood Cliffs, NJ	Rudy Van Gelder		Coltrane, ss, ts; McCoy Tyner, p; Jimmy Garrison, b; Elvin Jones, dr.
"Consequences"	7:15	John Coltrane Quartet	J. Coltrane	1965-09-02	Van Gelder Studio	Englewood Cliffs, NJ	Rudy Van Gelder		Coltrane, ss, ts; McCoy Tyner, p; Jimmy Garrison, b; Elvin Jones, dr.
"Serenity"	6:11	John Coltrane Quartet	J. Coltrane	1965-09-02	Van Gelder Studio	Englewood Cliffs, NJ	Rudy Van Gelder		Coltrane, ss, ts; McCoy Tyner, p; Jimmy Garrison, b; Elvin Jones, dr.
"Joy"	12:10	John Coltrane Quartet	J. Coltrane	1965-09-22	Coast Recorders	San Francisco, CA			Coltrane, ss, ts; McCoy Tyner, p; Jimmy Garrison, b; Elvin Jones, dr.
"Cosmos"	10:49	John Coltrane Group	J. Coltrane	1965-09-30	The Penthouse	Seattle, WA	Jan Kurtis		Coltrane, ss, ts; Pharoah Sanders, ts; Donald Garrett, bcl, b; McCoy Tyner, p; Jimmy Garrison, b; Elvin Jones, dr.
"Out of This World"	24:18	John Coltrane Group	H. Arlen - J. Mercer	1965-09-30	The Penthouse	Seattle, WA	Jan Kurtis		Coltrane, ss, ts; Pharoah Sanders, ts; Donald Garrett, bcl, b; McCoy Tyner, p; Jimmy Garrison, b; Elvin Jones, dr.
"Evolution"	36:22	John Coltrane Group	J. Coltrane	1965-09-30	The Penthouse	Seattle, WA	Jan Kurtis		Coltrane, ss, ts; Pharoah Sanders, ts; Donald Garrett, bcl, b; McCoy Tyner, p; Jimmy Garrison, b; Elvin Jones, dr.
"Tapestry In Sound (Bass Solo)"	6:07	John Coltrane Group		1965-09-30	The Penthouse	Seattle, WA	Jan Kurtis		Coltrane, ss, ts; Pharoah Sanders, ts; Donald Garrett, bcl, b; McCoy Tyner, p; Jimmy Garrison, b; Elvin Jones, dr.
"Bass Duet"		John Coltrane Group		1965-09-30	The Penthouse	Seattle, WA	Jan Kurtis		Coltrane, ss, ts; Pharoah Sanders, ts; Donald Garrett, bcl, b; McCoy Tyner, p; Jimmy Garrison, b; Elvin Jones, dr.
"Thumb Piano Piece"		John Coltrane Group		1965-09-30	The Penthouse	Seattle, WA	Jan Kurtis		Coltrane, ss, ts; Pharoah Sanders, ts; Donald Garrett, bcl, b; McCoy Tyner, p; Jimmy Garrison, b; Elvin Jones, dr.
"Body And Soul"	21:03	John Coltrane Group	Green-Eyeton-Heyman-Sour	1965-09-30	The Penthouse	Seattle, WA	Jan Kurtis		Coltrane, ss, ts; Pharoah Sanders, ts; Donald Garrett, bcl, b; McCoy Tyner, p; Jimmy Garrison, b; Elvin Jones, dr.
"Afro-Blue"	34:15	John Coltrane Group	M. Santamaria	1965-09-30	The Penthouse	Seattle, WA	Jan Kurtis		Coltrane, ss, ts; Pharoah Sanders, ts; Donald Garrett, bcl, b; McCoy Tyner, p; Jimmy Garrison, b; Elvin Jones, dr.
"Om Pt. 1"	15:02	John Coltrane Group	J. Coltrane	1965-10-01	Camelot Sound Studios	Lynnwood, WA	Jan Kurtis		Coltrane, ss, ts; Pharoah Sanders, ts; Joe Brazil, fl; Donald Garrett, bcl, b; McCoy Tyner, p; Jimmy Garrison, b; Elvin Jones, dr.
"Om Pt. 2"	13:58	John Coltrane Group	J. Coltrane	1965-10-01	Camelot Sound Studios	Lynnwood, WA	Jan Kurtis		Coltrane, ss, ts; Pharoah Sanders, ts; Joe Brazil, fl; Donald Garrett, bcl, b; McCoy Tyner, p; Jimmy Garrison, b; Elvin Jones, dr.
"Kulu Se Mama"	18:19	John Coltrane Group	J. Lewis	1965-10-14	Western Recorders	Los Angeles, CA			Coltrane, Pharoah Sanders, ts; Donald Garrett, bcl, b; McCoy Tyner, p; Jimmy Garrison, b; Elvin Jones, dr; Frank Butler, dr; Juno Lewis, perc, vcl.
"Selflessness"	14:47	John Coltrane Group	J. Coltrane	1965-10-14	Western Recorders	Los Angeles, CA			Coltrane, Pharoah Sanders, ts; Donald Garrett, bcl, b; McCoy Tyner, p; Jimmy Garrison, b; Elvin Jones, dr; Frank Butler, dr; Juno Lewis, perc, vcl.
"Suite: Meditations: The Father and the Son and the Holy Ghost"	12:51	John Coltrane Sextet	J. Coltrane	1965-11-23	Van Gelder Studio	Englewood Cliffs, NJ	Rudy Van Gelder		Coltrane, ss, ts; Pharoah Sanders, ts; McCoy Tyner, p; Jimmy Garrison, b; Elvin Jones, Rashied Ali, dr.
"Suite: Meditations: Compassion"	6:49	John Coltrane Sextet	J. Coltrane	1965-11-23	Van Gelder Studio	Englewood Cliffs, NJ	Rudy Van Gelder		Coltrane, ss, ts; Pharoah Sanders, ts; McCoy Tyner, p; Jimmy Garrison, b; Elvin Jones, Rashied Ali, dr.
"Suite: Meditations: Love"	8:09	John Coltrane Sextet	J. Coltrane	1965-11-23	Van Gelder Studio	Englewood Cliffs, NJ	Rudy Van Gelder		Coltrane, ss, ts; Pharoah Sanders, ts; McCoy Tyner, p; Jimmy Garrison, b; Elvin Jones, Rashied Ali, dr.
"Suite: Meditations: Serenity"	9:13	John Coltrane Sextet	J. Coltrane	1965-11-23	Van Gelder Studio	Englewood Cliffs, NJ	Rudy Van Gelder		Coltrane, ss, ts; Pharoah Sanders, ts; McCoy Tyner, p; Jimmy Garrison, b; Elvin Jones, Rashied Ali, dr.
"Suite: Meditations: Consequences"	3:29	John Coltrane Sextet	J. Coltrane	1965-11-23	Van Gelder Studio	Englewood Cliffs, NJ	Rudy Van Gelder		Coltrane, ss, ts; Pharoah Sanders, ts; McCoy Tyner, p; Jimmy Garrison, b; Elvin Jones, Rashied Ali, dr.
"Manifestation"	11:44	John Coltrane Sextet	J. Coltrane	1966-02-02	Coast Recorders	San Francisco, CA	Rudy Hill		John Coltrane, tenor saxophone, bass clarinet; Pharoah Sanders, tenor saxophone, flute, piccolo; Alice Coltrane, piano; Jimmy Garrison, bass; Rashied Ali, drums; Ray Appleton, perc
"Reverend King"	10:45	John Coltrane Sextet	J. Coltrane	1966-02-02	Coast Recorders	San Francisco, CA	Rudy Hill		John Coltrane, tenor saxophone, bass clarinet; Pharoah Sanders, tenor saxophone, flute, piccolo; Alice Coltrane, piano; Jimmy Garrison, bass; Rashied Ali, drums; Ray Appleton, perc
"Peace on Earth"	9:03	John Coltrane Sextet	J. Coltrane	1966-02-02	Coast Recorders	San Francisco, CA	Rudy Hill		John Coltrane, tenor saxophone, bass clarinet; Pharoah Sanders, tenor saxophone, flute, piccolo; Alice Coltrane, piano; Jimmy Garrison, bass; Rashied Ali, drums; Ray Appleton, perc
"Leo"	10:08	John Coltrane Sextet	J. Coltrane	1966-02-02	Coast Recorders	San Francisco, CA	Rudy Hill		John Coltrane, tenor saxophone, bass clarinet; Pharoah Sanders, tenor saxophone, flute, piccolo; Alice Coltrane, piano; Jimmy Garrison, bass; Rashied Ali, drums; Ray Appleton, perc
"Darkness"		John Coltrane Quintet	J. Coltrane	1966-04-21	Van Gelder Studio	Englewood Cliffs, NJ	Rudy Van Gelder		John Coltrane, tenor saxophone; Pharoah Sanders, tenor saxophone, flute; Alice Coltrane, piano; Jimmy Garrison, bass; Rashied Ali, drums.
"Lead Us On"		John Coltrane Quintet	J. Coltrane	1966-04-21	Van Gelder Studio	Englewood Cliffs, NJ	Rudy Van Gelder		John Coltrane, tenor saxophone; Pharoah Sanders, tenor saxophone, flute; Alice Coltrane, piano; Jimmy Garrison, bass; Rashied Ali, drums.
"Leo"		John Coltrane Quintet	J. Coltrane	1966-04-21	Van Gelder Studio	Englewood Cliffs, NJ	Rudy Van Gelder		John Coltrane, tenor saxophone; Pharoah Sanders, tenor saxophone, flute; Alice Coltrane, piano; Jimmy Garrison, bass; Rashied Ali, drums.
"Peace on Earth"		John Coltrane Quintet	J. Coltrane	1966-04-21	Van Gelder Studio	Englewood Cliffs, NJ	Rudy Van Gelder		John Coltrane, tenor saxophone; Pharoah Sanders, tenor saxophone, flute; Alice Coltrane, piano; Jimmy Garrison, bass; Rashied Ali, drums.
"Call"		John Coltrane Quintet	J. Coltrane	1966-04-28	Van Gelder Studio	Englewood Cliffs, NJ	Rudy Van Gelder		John Coltrane, tenor saxophone; Pharoah Sanders, tenor saxophone, flute; Alice Coltrane, piano; Jimmy Garrison, bass; Rashied Ali, drums.
"Leo"		John Coltrane Quintet	J. Coltrane	1966-04-28	Van Gelder Studio	Englewood Cliffs, NJ	Rudy Van Gelder		John Coltrane, tenor saxophone; Pharoah Sanders, tenor saxophone, flute; Alice Coltrane, piano; Jimmy Garrison, bass; Rashied Ali, drums.
"My Favorite Things"	26:04	John Coltrane Sextet	R. Rodgers - O. Hammerstein	1966-05-28	Village Vanguard	New York, NY	Rudy Van Gelder		John Coltrane, soprano saxophone, tenor saxophone, bass clarinet; Pharoah Sanders, tenor saxophone, flute; Alice Coltrane, piano; Jimmy Garrison, bass; Rashied Ali, drums; Emanuel Rahim, perc.
"Naima"	14:51	John Coltrane Sextet	J. Coltrane	1966-05-28	Village Vanguard	New York, NY	Rudy Van Gelder		John Coltrane, soprano saxophone, tenor saxophone, bass clarinet; Pharoah Sanders, tenor saxophone, flute; Alice Coltrane, piano; Jimmy Garrison, bass; Rashied Ali, drums; Emanuel Rahim, perc.
"My Favorite Things"	2:05	John Coltrane Quintet	R. Rodgers - O. Hammerstein	1966-07-02	Newport Jazz Festival	Newport, RI			Coltrane, soprano saxophone, tenor saxophone, bass clarinet; Pharoah Sanders, tenor saxophone, piccolo; Alice Coltrane, piano; Jimmy Garrison, bass; Rashied Ali, drums.
"Welcome"	11:28	John Coltrane Quintet	J. Coltrane	1966-07-02	Newport Jazz Festival	Newport, RI			Coltrane, soprano saxophone, tenor saxophone, bass clarinet; Pharoah Sanders, tenor saxophone, piccolo; Alice Coltrane, piano; Jimmy Garrison, bass; Rashied Ali, drums.
"Leo"	23:17	John Coltrane Quintet	J. Coltrane	1966-07-02	Newport Jazz Festival	Newport, RI			Coltrane, soprano saxophone, tenor saxophone, bass clarinet; Pharoah Sanders, tenor saxophone, piccolo; Alice Coltrane, piano; Jimmy Garrison, bass; Rashied Ali, drums.
"Afro-Blue"	39:10	John Coltrane Quintet	M. Santamaria	1966-07-11	Sankei Hall	Tokyo, Japan	Tokyo Broadcasting System Radio Technical Group		Coltrane, soprano, alto, tenor saxophones, percussion; Pharoah Sanders, alto, tenor saxophone, percussion; Alice Coltrane, piano; Jimmy Garrison, bass; Rashied Ali, drums.
"Peace on Earth"	26:15	John Coltrane Quintet	J. Coltrane	1966-07-11	Sankei Hall	Tokyo, Japan	Tokyo Broadcasting System Radio Technical Group		Coltrane, soprano, alto, tenor saxophones, percussion; Pharoah Sanders, alto, tenor saxophone, percussion; Alice Coltrane, piano; Jimmy Garrison, bass; Rashied Ali, drums.
"Bass Introduction"	7:30	John Coltrane Quintet	J. Garrison	1966-07-11	Sankei Hall	Tokyo, Japan	Tokyo Broadcasting System Radio Technical Group		Coltrane, soprano, alto, tenor saxophones, percussion; Pharoah Sanders, alto, tenor saxophone, percussion; Alice Coltrane, piano; Jimmy Garrison, bass; Rashied Ali, drums.
"Crescent"	41:45	John Coltrane Quintet	J. Coltrane	1966-07-11	Sankei Hall	Tokyo, Japan	Tokyo Broadcasting System Radio Technical Group		Coltrane, soprano, alto, tenor saxophones, percussion; Pharoah Sanders, alto, tenor saxophone, percussion; Alice Coltrane, piano; Jimmy Garrison, bass; Rashied Ali, drums.
"Leo"	0:53	John Coltrane Quintet	J. Coltrane	1966-07-11	Sankei Hall	Tokyo, Japan	Tokyo Broadcasting System Radio Technical Group		Coltrane, soprano, alto, tenor saxophones, percussion; Pharoah Sanders, alto, tenor saxophone, percussion; Alice Coltrane, piano; Jimmy Garrison, bass; Rashied Ali, drums.
"Peace on Earth"	26:04	John Coltrane Quintet	J. Coltrane	1966-07-22	Kosei-nenkin Hall	Tokyo, Japan	Tokyo Broadcasting System Radio Technical Group		Coltrane, soprano, alto, tenor saxophone, percussion; Pharoah Sanders, alto, tenor saxophone, percussion; Alice Coltrane, piano; Jimmy Garrison, bass; Rashied Ali, drums.
"My Favorite Things"	56:14	John Coltrane Quintet	R. Rodgers - O. Hammerstein	1966-07-22	Kosei-nenkin Hall	Tokyo, Japan	Tokyo Broadcasting System Radio Technical Group		Coltrane, soprano, alto, tenor saxophone, percussion; Pharoah Sanders, alto, tenor saxophone, percussion; Alice Coltrane, piano; Jimmy Garrison, bass; Rashied Ali, drums.
"Meditations/Leo"	45:31	John Coltrane Quintet	J. Coltrane	1966-07-22	Kosei-nenkin Hall	Tokyo, Japan	Tokyo Broadcasting System Radio Technical Group		Coltrane, soprano, alto, tenor saxophone, percussion; Pharoah Sanders, alto, tenor saxophone, percussion; Alice Coltrane, piano; Jimmy Garrison, bass; Rashied Ali, drums.
"Naima"	16:28	John Coltrane Quintet	J. Coltrane	1966-11-11	Temple University	Philadelphia, PA	WRTI		Coltrane, soprano and tenor saxophone; Alice Coltrane, piano; Sonny Johnson, bass; Rashied Ali, drums; Umar Ali, percussion; Charles Brown, percussion; Algie DeWitt, percussion; Robert Kenyatta, percussion.
"Crescent"	26:11	John Coltrane Quintet	J. Coltrane	1966-11-11	Temple University	Philadelphia, PA	WRTI		Coltrane, soprano and tenor saxophone; Alice Coltrane, piano; Sonny Johnson, bass; Rashied Ali, drums; Umar Ali, percussion; Charles Brown, percussion; Algie DeWitt, percussion; Robert Kenyatta, percussion, Arnold Joyner, alto saxophone.
"Leo"	21:29	John Coltrane Quintet	J. Coltrane	1966-11-11	Temple University	Philadelphia, PA	WRTI		Coltrane, soprano and tenor saxophone; Alice Coltrane, piano; Sonny Johnson, bass; Rashied Ali, drums; Umar Ali, percussion; Charles Brown, percussion; Algie DeWitt, percussion; Robert Kenyatta, percussion.
"Offering"	4:19	John Coltrane Quintet	J. Coltrane	1966-11-11	Temple University	Philadelphia, PA	WRTI		Coltrane, soprano and tenor saxophone; Alice Coltrane, piano; Sonny Johnson, bass; Rashied Ali, drums; Umar Ali, percussion; Charles Brown, percussion; Algie DeWitt, percussion; Robert Kenyatta, percussion.
"My Favorite Things"	23:18	John Coltrane Quintet	R. Rodgers - O. Hammerstein	1966-11-11	Temple University	Philadelphia PA	WRTI		Coltrane, soprano and tenor saxophone; Alice Coltrane, piano; Sonny Johnson, bass; Rashied Ali, drums; Umar Ali, percussion; Charles Brown, percussion; Algie DeWitt, percussion; Robert Kenyatta, percussion; Steven Knoblauch, alto saxophone.
"Sun Star" (alternate take)	8:05	John Coltrane Quartet	J. Coltrane	1967-02-15	Van Gelder Studio	Englewood Cliffs, NJ	Rudy Van Gelder		Coltrane, alto or tenor saxophone; Alice Coltrane, piano; Jimmy Garrison, bass; Rashied Ali, drums.
"Sun Ship"	6:05	John Coltrane Quartet	J. Coltrane	1967-02-15	Van Gelder Studio	Englewood Cliffs, NJ	Rudy Van Gelder		Coltrane, alto or tenor saxophone; Alice Coltrane, piano; Jimmy Garrison, bass; Rashied Ali, drums.
"Stellar Regions"	3:31	John Coltrane Quartet	J. Coltrane	1967-02-15	Van Gelder Studio	Englewood Cliffs, NJ	Rudy Van Gelder		Coltrane, alto or tenor saxophone; Alice Coltrane, piano; Jimmy Garrison, bass; Rashied Ali, drums.
"Stellar Regions" (alternate take)	4:37	John Coltrane Quartet	J. Coltrane	1967-02-15	Van Gelder Studio	Englewood Cliffs, NJ	Rudy Van Gelder		Coltrane, alto or tenor saxophone; Alice Coltrane, piano; Jimmy Garrison, bass; Rashied Ali, drums.
"Configuration"	4:01	John Coltrane Quartet	J. Coltrane	1967-02-15	Van Gelder Studio	Englewood Cliffs, NJ	Rudy Van Gelder		Coltrane, alto or tenor saxophone; Alice Coltrane, piano; Jimmy Garrison, bass; Rashied Ali, drums.
"Iris"	3:50	John Coltrane Quartet	J. Coltrane	1967-02-15	Van Gelder Studio	Englewood Cliffs, NJ	Rudy Van Gelder		Coltrane, alto or tenor saxophone; Alice Coltrane, piano; Jimmy Garrison, bass; Rashied Ali, drums.
"Offering"	8:20	John Coltrane Quartet	J. Coltrane	1967-02-15	Van Gelder Studio	Englewood Cliffs, NJ	Rudy Van Gelder		Coltrane, alto or tenor saxophone; Alice Coltrane, piano; Jimmy Garrison, bass; Rashied Ali, drums.
"Seraphic Light"	8:54	John Coltrane Quartet	J. Coltrane	1967-02-15	Van Gelder Studio	Englewood Cliffs, NJ	Rudy Van Gelder		Coltrane, alto or tenor saxophone; Alice Coltrane, piano; Jimmy Garrison, bass; Rashied Ali, drums.
"Tranesonic" (alternate take)	2:48	John Coltrane Quartet	J. Coltrane	1967-02-15	Van Gelder Studio	Englewood Cliffs, NJ	Rudy Van Gelder		Coltrane, alto or tenor saxophone; Alice Coltrane, piano; Jimmy Garrison, bass; Rashied Ali, drums.
"Tranesonic"	4:14	John Coltrane Quartet	J. Coltrane	1967-02-15	Van Gelder Studio	Englewood Cliffs, NJ	Rudy Van Gelder		Coltrane, alto or tenor saxophone; Alice Coltrane, piano; Jimmy Garrison, bass; Rashied Ali, drums.
"Jimmy's Mode"	5:58	John Coltrane Quartet	J. Coltrane	1967-02-15	Van Gelder Studio	Englewood Cliffs, NJ	Rudy Van Gelder		Coltrane, alto or tenor saxophone; Alice Coltrane, piano; Jimmy Garrison, bass; Rashied Ali, drums.
"Mars"	10:41	John Coltrane/Rashied Ali	J. Coltrane	1967-02-22	Van Gelder Studio	Englewood Cliffs, NJ	Rudy Van Gelder		Coltrane, tenor saxophone, bells; Rashied Ali, drums, percussion.
"Leo"	11:00	John Coltrane/Rashied Ali	J. Coltrane	1967-02-22	Van Gelder Studio	Englewood Cliffs, NJ	Rudy Van Gelder		Coltrane, tenor saxophone, bells; Rashied Ali, drums, percussion.
"Venus"	8:17	John Coltrane/Rashied Ali	J. Coltrane	1967-02-22	Van Gelder Studio	Englewood Cliffs, NJ	Rudy Van Gelder		Coltrane, tenor saxophone, bells; Rashied Ali, drums, percussion.
"Jupiter Variation"	6:45	John Coltrane/Rashied Ali	J. Coltrane	1967-02-22	Van Gelder Studio	Englewood Cliffs, NJ	Rudy Van Gelder		Coltrane, tenor saxophone, bells; Rashied Ali, drums, percussion.
"Jupiter"	5:21	John Coltrane/Rashied Ali	J. Coltrane	1967-02-22	Van Gelder Studio	Englewood Cliffs, NJ	Rudy Van Gelder		Coltrane, tenor saxophone, bells; Rashied Ali, drums, percussion.
"Saturn"	11:35	John Coltrane/Rashied Ali	J. Coltrane	1967-02-22	Van Gelder Studio	Englewood Cliffs, NJ	Rudy Van Gelder		Coltrane, tenor saxophone, bells; Rashied Ali, drums, percussion.
"E Minor"	6:51	John Coltrane Quintet	J. Coltrane	1967-02-27	Van Gelder Studio	Englewood Cliffs, NJ	Rudy Van Gelder		Marion Brown, as, bells; John Coltrane, tenor saxophone; Alice Coltrane, piano; Jimmy Garrison, bass; Rashied Ali, drums.
"Half Steps"	7:10	John Coltrane Quintet	J. Coltrane	1967-02-27	Van Gelder Studio	Englewood Cliffs, NJ	Rudy Van Gelder		Marion Brown, as, bells; John Coltrane, tenor saxophone; Alice Coltrane, piano; Jimmy Garrison, bass; Rashied Ali, drums.
"Number One"	12:00	John Coltrane Quartet	J. Coltrane	1967-03-07	Van Gelder Studio	Englewood Cliffs, NJ	Rudy Van Gelder		Coltrane, tenor saxophone; Alice Coltrane, piano; Jimmy Garrison, bass; Rashied Ali, drums.
"Drum Solo"	7:00	John Coltrane Quartet		1967-03-07	Van Gelder Studio	Englewood Cliffs, NJ	Rudy Van Gelder		Coltrane, tenor saxophone; Alice Coltrane, piano; Jimmy Garrison, bass; Rashied Ali, drums.
"Drum Solo"	7:00	John Coltrane Quartet		1967-03-07	Van Gelder Studio	Englewood Cliffs, NJ	Rudy Van Gelder		Coltrane, tenor saxophone; Alice Coltrane, piano; Jimmy Garrison, bass; Rashied Ali, drums.
"Bass Solo"	12:45	John Coltrane Quartet		1967-03-07	Van Gelder Studio	Englewood Cliffs, NJ	Rudy Van Gelder		Coltrane, tenor saxophone; Alice Coltrane, piano; Jimmy Garrison, bass; Rashied Ali, drums.
"Piano"	14:15	John Coltrane Quartet		1967-03-07	Van Gelder Studio	Englewood Cliffs, NJ	Rudy Van Gelder		Coltrane, tenor saxophone; Alice Coltrane, piano; Jimmy Garrison, bass; Rashied Ali, drums.
"Piano Solo"	9:39	John Coltrane Quartet		1967-03-07	Van Gelder Studio	Englewood Cliffs, NJ	Rudy Van Gelder		Coltrane, tenor saxophone; Alice Coltrane, piano; Jimmy Garrison, bass; Rashied Ali, drums.
"Ogunde" (false start)		John Coltrane Quartet	Traditional, Arr. J. Coltrane	1967-03-07	Van Gelder Studio	Englewood Cliffs, NJ	Rudy Van Gelder		Coltrane, tenor saxophone; Alice Coltrane, piano; Jimmy Garrison, bass; Rashied Ali, drums.
"Ogunde"	3:34	John Coltrane Quartet	Traditional, Arr. J. Coltrane	1967-03-07	Van Gelder Studio	Englewood Cliffs, NJ	Rudy Van Gelder		Coltrane, tenor saxophone; Alice Coltrane, piano; Jimmy Garrison, bass; Rashied Ali, drums.
"Number Eight"		John Coltrane Quartet	J. Coltrane	1967-03-29	Van Gelder Studio	Englewood Cliffs, NJ	Rudy Van Gelder		Coltrane, tenor saxophone; Alice Coltrane, piano; Jimmy Garrison, bass; Rashied Ali, drums.
"Number Seven"		John Coltrane Quartet	J. Coltrane	1967-03-29	Van Gelder Studio	Englewood Cliffs, NJ	Rudy Van Gelder		Coltrane, tenor saxophone; Alice Coltrane, piano; Jimmy Garrison, bass; Rashied Ali, drums.
"Number Six"		John Coltrane Quartet	J. Coltrane	1967-03-29	Van Gelder Studio	Englewood Cliffs, NJ	Rudy Van Gelder		Coltrane, tenor saxophone; Alice Coltrane, piano; Jimmy Garrison, bass; Rashied Ali, drums.
"Number Five"		John Coltrane Quartet	J. Coltrane	1967-03-29	Van Gelder Studio	Englewood Cliffs, NJ	Rudy Van Gelder		Coltrane, tenor saxophone; Alice Coltrane, piano; Jimmy Garrison, bass; Rashied Ali, drums.
"Number Four"		John Coltrane Quartet	J. Coltrane	1967-03-29	Van Gelder Studio	Englewood Cliffs, NJ	Rudy Van Gelder		Coltrane, tenor saxophone; Alice Coltrane, piano; Jimmy Garrison, bass; Rashied Ali, drums.
"Number Two"		John Coltrane Quartet	J. Coltrane	1967-03-29	Van Gelder Studio	Englewood Cliffs, NJ	Rudy Van Gelder		Coltrane, tenor saxophone; Alice Coltrane, piano; Jimmy Garrison, bass; Rashied Ali, drums.
"Ogunde"	28:25	John Coltrane Septet	Traditional, Arr. J. Coltrane	1967-04-23	Olatunji Center of African Culture	New York, NY	Bernard Drayton		Coltrane, soprano, tenor saxophone; Pharoah Sanders, tenor saxophone; Alice Coltrane, piano; Jimmy Garrison, bass; Rashied Ali, drums; Algie Dewitt, bata drum; probably Jumma Santos, perc.
"My Favorite Things"	34:38	John Coltrane Septet	R. Rodgers - O. Hammerstein	1967-04-23	Olatunji Center of African Culture	New York, NY	Bernard Drayton		Coltrane, soprano, tenor saxophone; Pharoah Sanders, tenor saxophone; Alice Coltrane, piano; Jimmy Garrison, bass; Rashied Ali, drums; Algie Dewitt, bata drum; probably Jumma Santos, perc.
"Tunji"		John Coltrane Septet	J. Coltrane	1967-04-23	Olatunji Center of African Culture	New York, NY	Bernard Drayton		Coltrane, soprano, tenor saxophone; Pharoah Sanders, tenor saxophone; Alice Coltrane, piano; Jimmy Garrison, bass; Rashied Ali, drums; Algie Dewitt, bata drum; probably Jumma Santos, perc.
"Acknowledgement"		John Coltrane Septet	J. Coltrane	1967-04-23	Olatunji Center of African Culture	New York, NY	Bernard Drayton		Coltrane, soprano, tenor saxophone; Pharoah Sanders, tenor saxophone; Alice Coltrane, piano; Jimmy Garrison, bass; Rashied Ali, drums; Algie Dewitt, bata drum; probably Jumma Santos, perc.
"None Other"	14:28	John Coltrane Sextet	J. Coltrane	1967-05-17	Van Gelder Studio	Englewood Cliffs, NJ	Rudy Van Gelder		Pharoah Sanders, alto saxophone; John Coltrane, tenor saxophone; Alice Coltrane, piano; Jimmy Garrison, bass; Rashied Ali, drums; Algie DeWitt, Bata drum
"Collidoscope"	35:52	John Coltrane Sextet	J. Coltrane	1967-05-17	Van Gelder Studio	Englewood Cliffs, NJ	Rudy Van Gelder		Pharoah Sanders, alto saxophone; John Coltrane, tenor saxophone; Alice Coltrane, piano; Jimmy Garrison, bass; Rashied Ali, drums; Algie DeWitt, Bata drum
"To Be"	16:18	John Coltrane Quartet	J. Coltrane	Spring 1967	Van Gelder Studio	Englewood Cliffs, NJ	Rudy Van Gelder		Coltrane, flute; tenor saxophone; Pharoah Sanders, picolo, flute; Alice Coltrane, piano; Jimmy Garrison, bass; Rashied Ali, drums.
"Expression"	10:46	John Coltrane Quartet	J. Coltrane	Spring 1967	Van Gelder Studio	Englewood Cliffs, NJ	Rudy Van Gelder		Coltrane, flute; tenor saxophone; Pharoah Sanders, picolo, flute; Alice Coltrane, piano; Jimmy Garrison, bass; Rashied Ali, drums.
