= Live at Sweet Basil =

Live at Sweet Basil may refer to:

- Live at Sweet Basil (McCoy Tyner album), 1989
- Live at Sweet Basil (Gil Evans album) (recorded in 1984 - released 1986)
- Live at Sweet Basil Vol. 2, by Gil Evans (released 1987)
- Live at Sweet Basil (Paul Bley album) (1988)
- Live at Sweet Basil Volume 1, a 1984 recording by David Murray
- Live at Sweet Basil Volume 2, a 1984 recording by David Murray
- The Super Quartet Live at Sweet Basil, a 1987 recording by Mal Waldron featuring Steve Lacy
- Live at Sweet Basil (Steve Lacy album), 1991

== See also ==
- Solar: Live at Sweet Basil, a 1991 recording by McCoy Tyner
