= Priestess (album) =

Live album by Gil Evans
- Released: 1983
- Recorded: May 13, 1977
- Venue: St. George Church, New York City
- Genre: Jazz
- Length: 41:11
- Label: Antilles AN 1010
- Producer: John Simon

Gil Evans chronology
Where Flamingos Fly (1981)	Priestess (1983)	British Orchestra (1983)

Priestess is a live album by jazz composer, arranger, conductor and keyboardist Gil Evans recorded in 1977 and performed by Evans with an orchestra featuring David Sanborn, Arthur Blythe, Lew Soloff, and George Adams.

== Reception ==
In 1984, this album was nominated for Grammy Award for Best Jazz Instrumental Performance, Group.

The Allmusic review by Scott Yanow awarded the album 4 stars stating "After the success of his studio sessions of the early to mid-'70s, Gil Evans primarily recorded live in concert during the remainder of his career. This is one of the better sets... the music is quite stimulating and exciting".

Professional ratings
Review scores
Source	Rating
Allmusic	4/5 stars
The Rolling Stone Jazz Record Guide	4/5 stars

== Track listing ==
1. "Priestess" (Billy Harper) - 19:42
2. "Short Visit" (John Simon) - 12:07
3. "Lunar Eclipse (月食, Gessyoku)" (Masabumi Kikuchi) - 4:19
4. "Orange Was the Color of Her Dress, Then Blue Silk" (Charles Mingus) - 4:40

== Personnel ==
- Gil Evans - piano, arranger, conductor
- Lew Soloff - trumpet, piccolo trumpet
- Hannibal Marvin Peterson, Ernie Royal - trumpet
- Jimmy Knepper - trombone
- John Clark - French horn
- Howard Johnson, Bob Stewart - tuba
- Arthur Blythe, David Sanborn - alto saxophone
- George Adams - tenor saxophone
- Pete Levin - synthesizer, clavinet
- Keith Loving - guitar
- Steve Neil - bass
- Sue Evans - drums
