= Pete Levin =

American jazz musician (born 1942)

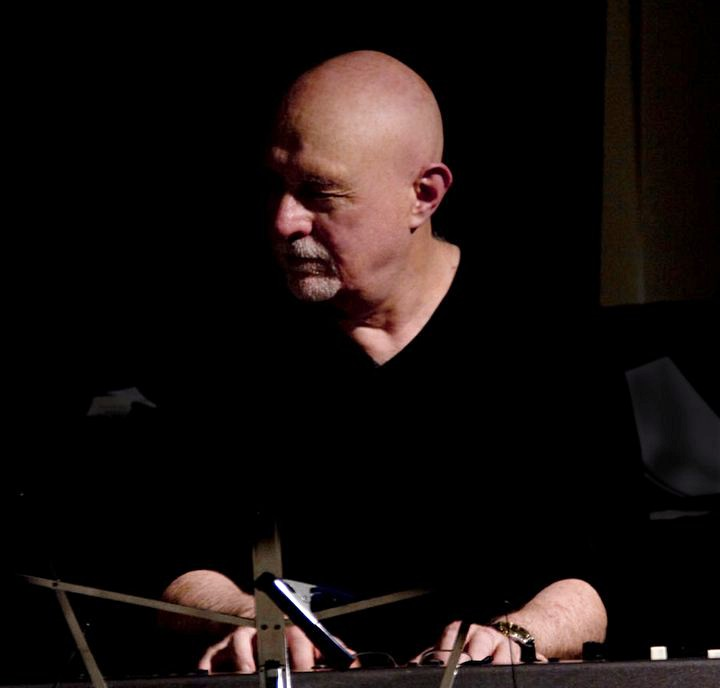
- Levin performing with the Lou Marini Quintet in 2010

Background information
- Born: December 20, 1942 (age 83); Boston, Massachusetts, U.S.
- Origin: New York City
- Genre: Jazz
- Occupations: Musician, bandleader
- Instrument: Keyboards
- Years active: 1960s–present
- Labels: Gramavision; Alternate Mode; Motéma
- Website: petelevin.com

Pete Levin (born December 20, 1942) is an American jazz keyboardist, composer, and record producer.

== Career ==
Pete Levin grew up in Brookline, Massachusetts. His first instrument as a teenager was the French horn. He studied at Boston University and received a master's degree from Juilliard School in New York City. Levin was introduced to the Hammond organ by a fellow musician in the late 1960s while serving in the army. In the early 1970s he joined the Gil Evans Orchestra as a French horn player. At the time, Levin was experimenting with synthesizers. Evans incorporated Levin's synthesizer sound into the compositions and his role changed to a full-time keyboardist. His fifteen-year association with the Gil Evans Orchestra was followed by an eight-year association with Jimmy Giuffre.

Levin plays piano, Hammond organ, clavinet, and Moog synthesizer. He has produced several albums as a bandleader, including the 2007 Deacon Blues and Jump! in 2010. In 2014 he released a collaborative album with his brother, bassist Tony Levin, titled Levin Brothers. The album is a tribute to Oscar Pettiford and Julius Watkins.

Levin has performed for film and television scores including Missing in Action, Lean on Me, Silver Bullet, Red Scorpion, The Color of Money, Maniac, Spin City, America's Most Wanted and Star Trek. He has composed orchestral scores of his own for Zelimo and The Dybbuk. He was awarded the Army Commendation Medal for writing the official military band arrangement of the U.S. Infantry song.

He has worked with Carla Bley, Brubeck Brothers, Hiram Bullock, Jimmy Cobb, Billy Cobham, Willie Colón, Kal David, Miles Davis, Rachelle Farrell, Bryan Ferry, Gregory Hines, The Thad Jones/Mel Lewis Orchestra, Annie Lennox, Chuck Mangione, Charles Mingus, Gerry Mulligan, Jaco Pastorius, Genya Ravan, Robbie Robertson, Salt-n-Pepa, David Sanborn, John Scofield, Wayne Shorter, Paul Simon, Lew Soloff, John Tropea, Joe Louis Walker, Vanessa Williams, and Lenny White.

Regarding his creative work, Levin stated that "All my arranging and orchestrating work is grounded in what I experience in live performance...My best and most creative ideas come from playing live."

== Discography ==
=== As leader ===
- Close To You: The Clams (CTI, 1076) with Tony Levin
- The New Age of Christmas (Atlantic, 1989) with Danny Gottlieb
- Masters in This Hall (Gramavision, 1990) with Danny Gottlieb
- Party in the Basement (Gramavision, 1990)
- A Solitary Man (Gramavision, 1991)
- Music for the Dybbuk (Peter Levin Music, 1974/1996)
- Harmony (Alternate Mode, 1998)
- Crystals (Alternate Mode, 2000)
- Meditations (Alternate Mode, 2001) with Ali Ryerson
- Zelimo (PLM, 2001)
- Rhythm of the Spirit (Alternate Mode, 2002)
- Deacon Blues (Motéma, 2007)
- Certified Organic (PLM, 2008)
- Live in Foggia: Pete Levin Trio (PLM, 2009)
- Jump! (Independent, 2010)
- IridiumLive 008: 4-18-2012 (E1/Iridium Live, 2013)
- Levin Brothers (Lazy Bones, 2014) with Tony Levin
- Special Delivery (Lazy Bones, 2017) with Tony Levin
- The Monday Night Band: Live At The Cutting Room (Independent, 2017)
- Möbius (IYOUWE, 2017)
- Live At Daryl's House (Independent, 2021) with Tony Levin
- Fade To Blue (Independent, 2022) with Tony Levin
- J.S. Bach Inventions & Sinfonias (Independent, 2023)

=== As sideman ===
With Marc Black

- Pictures of the Highway (Suma, 2010)
- Live at the Bearsville Theater (Independent, 2015)
- Sing for the Silenced (Independent, 2015)

With Jay Chattaway

- Maniac (Southeast, 1980)
- Invasion USA (Varese Saraband, 1985)
- Maniac Cop (Varese Saraband, 1988)
- Red Scorpion (Varese Saraband, 1989)
- Maniac Cop 2 (Independent, 2014)

With John Clark

- I Will (Postcards, 1997)
- The Odd Couple Quintet (Composers Concordance, 2015)

With Bill Comeau

- Some Beautiful Day (Avant Garde, 1972)
- Grizzly Bear Hunt (Poison Ring, 1973)

With Gil Evans

- Blues in Orbit (Enja, 1971)
- Svengali (Atlantic, 1973)
- Live at Montreux (Phillips, 1974)
- The Gil Evans Orchestra Plays the Music of Jimi Hendrix (RCA, 1974)
- There Comes a Time (RCA, 1975)
- The Tokyo Concert (West Wind, 1976)
- Live in Barcelona (Atlantic, 1976)
- Priestess (Antilles, 1977)
- Parabola (Horo, 1979)
- Gil Evans Live at the Royal Festival Hall London 1978 (RCA, 1979)
- Live at the Public Theater (New York 1980) (Trio, 1981)
- Lunar Eclipse (New Tone, 1981)
- Live at Sweet Basil (Gramavision, 1984 [1986])
- Live at Sweet Basil Vol. 2 (Gramavision, 1984 [1987])
- Bud and Bird (Electric Bird/King, 1986 [1987])
- Farewell (Evidence, 1986 [1992])
- The Honey Man (New Tone, 1986)
- Live at Umbria Jazz (Umbria Jazz, 2000)

With Rachelle Ferrell

- First Instrument (Blue Note, 1990)
- Somethin' Else (Independent, 1997)

With Jimmy Giuffre

- Dragonfly (Soul Note, 1983)
- Quasar (Soul Note, 1985)
- Liquid Dancers (Soul Note, 1991)

With Richie Hart

- Blues in the Alley (Zoho, 2003)
- Greasy Street (Zoho, 2005)

With Tony Levin

- Waters of Eden (Narada, 2000)
- Resonator (Narada, 2006)

With Amy Rogell

- Come to the Playground (2000)
- Miles of Smiles (2007)

With Raphael Rudd

- Joyfest (1993)
- The Awakening Chronicles (Wedge Music, 1996)

With John Scofield

- Electric Outlet (Gramavision, 1984)
- Slow Sco (Gramavision, 1990)

With Lew Soloff

- Hanalei Bay (King, 1983)
- My Romance (King, 1988)
- Little Wing (Sweet Basil, 1991)

With Michael Veitch

- Heartlander (2006)
- Painted Heart (2007)
- The Veitch Boys (2015)

With Lou Volpe

- Can You Hear That (Cap, 2003)
- Undercovers (Jazz Guitar, 2006)

With Lenny White

- Present Tense (Hip Bop, 1994)
- Renderers of Spirit (Hip Bop Essence, 1997)
- Edge (Hip Bop, 1998)

With others

- Singalong Junk (Mercury, 1972), Gap Mangione
- Rejuvenation (Columbia, 1975), Don Elliott
- A Piece of the Apple (Arista, 1976), New York Mary
- Heart to Heart (Warner, 1978), David Sanborn
- Live at 55 Grand (1982), Jaco Pastorius
- So Nobody Else Can Hear (Contempo Vibrato, 1983), Jimmy Cobb
- Archipeligo (Sum, 1984), Barb Truex
- Manhattan Blue (King, 1986), Shunzo Ohno
- I'm a Survivor (Mercury, 1987), Zuice
- Robbie Robertson (Geffen, 1987), Robbie Robertson
- In Touch (Novus, 1988), Amina Claudine Myers
- On the Rise (GRP, 1989), Deborah Henson-Conant
- Dade ... In the Shade (Wavetone, 1990), Mark Egan
- Naked to the World (Atlantic, 1991), Nicki Richards
- In Flight (1993), Pieces of a Dream
- Body and Soul (Atlantic, 1993), Regina Carter
- BIII: Hard Rock Jazz (JVC, 1996), Toshihiko Kankawa
- Uptown Saturday Night (Arista, 1997) Camp Lo
- Smooth Romance (jazm, 1998), Janet Marlowe
- Top of the Food Chain (Sweetthing, 1998), Ellie Sarty
- La La Means Love (Motown, 1999), La La
- Second Nature (Blue Forest, 2000), Brubeck Brothers
- The Last Romantic (Narada, 2001), Artie Traum
- Duke, Billy & Tadd (Independent, 2004), Peter Welker
- Days of Horses (Independent, 2004), Aztec Two Step
- The O'Franken Factor Factor (Artemis, 2004), Al Franken
- GOP Party Monsters (Para, 2004), Wayne Lammers
- I Walk the Road Again (Roaring Stream, 2005), Happy Traum
- Myth Songs (Mythsongs, 2005), Nick Humez
- Foreign Funk (Markei, 2007), Keith Marks
- Shining Hour (Independent, 2007), Jeff Oster
- Kingsway (Independent, 2008), Roman Klun
- Flowers to Strangers (2008), Lee Marvin
- Little Girl Dreams (2008), Athena Reich
- After the War (Independent, 2008), Rod MacDonald
- Wit of the Staircase (Vermicious Knid, 2009), Andy Rothstein
- Outside Looking In (Independent, 2009), Charles Lyonhart
- Kaleidoscope (Guavajamm, 2010), Lynette Washington
- And Here's to You (Macdee, 2010), Betty MacDonald and Joe Beck
- Fortune Cookie Philosophy (Independent, 2010), Erin Hobson
- Lost in Space (Independent, 2011), GI Blythe
- Con Brio! (Independent, 2011), Ali Ryerson
- Lovers After All (Independent, 2011), Deborah Winters
- Introducing Letizia Gambi (Jando Music, 2011), Letizia Gambi
- Cheesecake Girl (Independent, 2012), Genya Ravan
- Wild Animals (2014), Robert Capowsky
- Leila Gobi (Clermont Music, 2014), Leila Gobi
- Baudi (Clermont Music, 2015), Mamadou Kelly
- Djamila (Clermont Music, 2015), Mamadou Kelly
- Barcelona Notebook (Independent, 2015), Vincent Pasternak
- Sonar (Independent, 2015), Nick Holmes
- Uprising (Independent, 2016), Joan Henry
- Big City Blues (Independent, 2016), Ling Zhang
- Waxwing (Independent, 2016), Chrissy Gardner
- Blue Monday (Independent, 2016), Letizia Gambi
- All Kinds of Beki (Random Chance, 2016), Beki Brindle
- Find My Way (Independent, 2016), Hillary Chase
- Good Old Songs (2017), Rene Bailey
- Cool Night (Pierdon, 2017), Kathy Ingraham
- Flaming June (Independent, 2017), Kurt Henry
- It's Called Love (Independent 2018), Roseann Sureda
