= Live at Sweet Basil Vol. 2 =

Live album by Gil Evans & the Monday Night Orchestra
- Released: 1987
- Recorded: August 27, 1984 at Sweet Basil, NYC
- Genre: Jazz
- Length: 74:46
- Label: King/Electric Bird K32Y 6076; Gramavision 18-8708-1
- Producer: Horst Liepolt & Shigeyuki Kawashima

Gil Evans chronology
Live at Sweet Basil (1985)	Live at Sweet Basil Vol. 2 (1987)	Bud and Bird (1987)

Live Sweet Basil Vol. 2 is a live album by jazz composer, arranger, conductor and pianist Gil Evans recorded by King Records (Japan) in New York in 1984 featuring Evans with his Monday Night Orchestra which included George Adams, Howard Johnson, and Lew Soloff and originally released in the US on the Gramavision label.

== Reception ==
Allmusic awarded the album 2 stars, stating, " Although arranger/keyboardist Gil Evans is the leader of the 14-piece band, he has a very minor presence on the set, letting his talented sidemen get self-indulgent and take seemingly endless solos. Because the supporting cast includes such fine players... This is a lesser effort that should have been a memorable one".

Professional ratings
Review scores
Source	Rating
Allmusic	2/5 stars

== Track listing ==
All compositions by Gil Evans except as indicated

1. "Jelly Roll" - 11:15
2. "Friday the 13th" (Thelonious Monk) - 13:44
3. "Gone" – 16:00
4. "Prelude to Stone Free" - 8:42
5. "Stone Free" (Jimi Hendrix) - 14:00
6. "Snowflake Bop" (Anita Evans) - 16:58

== Personnel ==
- Gil Evans - piano, electric piano, arranger, conductor
- Lew Soloff, Hannibal Marvin Peterson, Shunzo Ohno, Miles Evans - trumpet
- George Adams - tenor saxophone
- Chris Hunter - alto saxophone
- Howard Johnson - tuba, baritone saxophone, bass clarinet
- Tom Malone - trombone
- Hiram Bullock - guitar
- Pete Levin - synthesizer
- Mark Egan - electric bass
- Adam Nussbaum - drums
- Mino Cinelu - percussion
