= Octavio Brunetti =

Argentine pianist

- Born: 12 May 1975; Rosario, Argentina
- Died: 29 August 2014 (aged 39) New York City, New York, United States
- Genres: Classical, Tango
- Occupations: Pianist, musician, composer, arranger
- Instrument: Piano
- Years active: 1991–2014
- Labels: CBS, Sony Classical
- Website: Official Website

Octavio Brunetti (May 12, 1975 – August 29, 2014) was an Argentine pianist, arranger and composer. He was best known for his participation in the album Te amo tango (Soundbrush Records SR 1009) by Raul Jaurena, which won the Latin Grammy Award for Best Tango Album in 2007, and was one of the most sought after tango pianists.

== Biography ==
Octavio Brunetti was born on May 12, 1975, in Rosario, Argentina. From early childhood, Brunetti was trained in classical piano, and before he even finished his studies at the National School of Music in Rosario he was already playing in concerts discovering his passion for the music from his country, the tango. In no time, he played with many important musicians such as famous singer Alberto Castillo, Eladia Blázquez, Rubén Juárez, Domingo Federico, Rodolfo Mederos and Osvaldo Piro, and he has shared the stage with Horacio Salgan-De Lio and Atilio Stampone. His talent earned him many awards and took him to perform at the famous Teatro Colón, Teatro San Martín, Buenos Aires, Teatro San Martín in Córdoba, Argentina, still at a very young age.

In 1991 he founded the Tango Rosario Symphony Orchestra and became a member of the Omar Torres Quintet with whom he made his first tango recording, Inquietudes. In 1997 he left the Quintet and joined the Domingo Federico Tango Orchestra, with whom he traveled through Argentina and Europe and recorded a second CD, Orquesta Juvenil de Tango de la U.N.R. Shortly after that Brunetti created his first quintet, playing original arrangements of traditional and modern tangos as well as original compositions. Throughout this time, he continued to perform classical repertoire in a piano duo with his sister Laura. In 2002, he was named conductor of the Orchestra of Popular Music of the Province of Córdoba.

In 2004 Brunetti moved to the U.S. to attend the Berklee College of Music. During this time he received two first prizes at the New York City International Tango Competition: Best Solo Pianist and Best Duo (with saxophonist Bernardo Monk). In 2005 he moved to New York and met bandoneón player Raúl Jaurena, with whom he recorded the CD Te amo tango, which won the Grammy Award for best tango album in 2007. He has also played with bandoneón masters Daniel Binelli, Hector Del Curto and Tito Castro. In 2005 he founded his own tango quintet, the Octavio Brunetti Quintet, in 2008 the Urban Tango Trio with Machiko Ozawa (violin) and Pedro Giraudo (bass), and in 2012 the trio Los Varones del Tango with Sergio Reyes (violin) and Pedro Giraudo (bass).

Brunetti performed with luminaries of the concert world, including world-renowned cellist Yo-Yo Ma, Cuban jazz saxophonist Paquito D’Rivera, and violinist Cho-Liang Lin. In addition, he participated in numerous music festivals throughout the United States, Europe, Asia, South America, and performed in venues such as Symphony Space, Blue Note, Rose Theatre (Jazz at Lincoln Center), Belleayre Music Festival, Ojai Music Festival, La Jolla Music Fest, New York Chamber Music Festival, Kennedy Center (Washington, D.C.), Tokyo Bunka Kaikan (Japan), Teatro San Martín (Buenos Aires), and Teatro Colón (Salón Dorado).

He was the piano soloist with the Washington, DC–based Pan American Symphony Orchestra (PASO) beginning in 2005. With PASO, he performed at the John F. Kennedy Center for the Performing Arts, the Lisner Auditorium, the Hall of the Americas at the Organization of American States, the Embassy of Argentina, the Mexican Cultural Institute, the Lyric Theater in Baltimore, and the Avalon Theater in Easton. In 2009 and 2011, he toured Peru with PASO, playing at the Ricardo Palma University and a command performance for President Alan Garcia at the Presidential Palace in Lima. He performed with PASO in 2012 at the Al-Bustan Music Festival in Beirut, Lebanon, as part of the only orchestra from the U.S. to be invited to this prestigious international event. Brunetti also joined PASO in January 2013 for the Latino Inaugural Celebration at the Kennedy Center in honor of President Obama's election victory, accompanying such Hispanic talent as Rita Moreno, Raul Esparza, Jose Feliciano, Chita Rivera, and Juan Diego Flores.

In September 2013 Octavio Brunetti’s arrangement of Astor Piazzolla’s suite La serie del Ángel, commissioned by the New York Philharmonic, got its premiere in a performance at the Philharmonic’s Opening Gala, conducted by Music Director Alan Gilbert, and performed by cellist Yo-Yo Ma (recorded by Sony BMG Classical, Appassionato).

Other well-known recordings include the Grammy-Award winning Te amor tango with Raúl Jaurena (bandoneon), the Grammy-nominated Piazzolla: desde estudios a tangos with violinist Elmira Darvarova, Urban Tango Trio with Machiko Ozawa (violin) and Pedro Giraudo (bass) and the original soundtrack recordings for Francis Ford Coppola’s films Tetro (Deutsche Grammophon) and Twixt, both with scores by Argentine composer Osvaldo Golijov.

In April 2014, he performed with PASO and the Choral Arts Society of Washington, DC at the Concert Hall of the Kennedy Center in a special program of Argentine music. In July 2014 Brunetti performed with his tango orchestra, the Octavio Brunetti Tango Orchestra, at the Midsummer Night Swing Festival at Lincoln Center in New York.

On August 3, 2014, Octavio Brunetti was hospitalized at Mount Sinai Hospital for an unexpected infectious illness. However, the doctors could not find the location of the infection or the cure, and Brunetti died on 29 August.

== Discography ==
- Inquietudes with the Omar Torres Quintet and Octet (Europhone, 1996)
- Orquesta Juvenil de Tango de la U.N.R. with Domingo Federico (EMR, 1997)
- Tierra y Asfalto (duo with guitarist Román Carballo, 2003)
- Te amo tango with bandoneonist Raúl Jaurena (Soundbrush Records, 2006)
- Soledad by Astor Piazzolla with cellist Yo-Yo Ma (Sony Classical, 2007)
- Tetro by Osvaldo Golijov (soundtrack of the film by Francis Ford Coppola, Deutsche Grammophon, 2009)
- Tango Conversations with guitarist Adam Tully (2009)
- Oscar e Familia with saxophonist Oscar Feldman et al. (Sunnyside Records, 2010)
- El Violin Latino with violinist Gregor Huebner (Peregrina Music, 2010, EAN 4012116506020)
- Tango & Obsession with violinist Nick Danielson (CD Baby, 2010, ASIN B004FNBY80)
- Urban Tango Trio with violinist Machiko Ozawa and bassist Pedro Giraudo (Cantaloupe Music, 2010)
- Twixt by Osvaldo Golijov (soundtrack of the film by Francis Ford Coppola, 2011)
- Adiós Nonino and other great Tangos by Piazzolla with violinist Elmira Darvarova (Delphinium Records, 2011)
- Marioneta with singer Noelia Moncada (MTT, 2011)
- Tango Distinto by Astor Piazzolla with trombonist Achilles Liarmakopoulos (Naxos Records, 2011)
- Masters of Bandoneon with Leonardo Suarez Paz’s Cuartetango String Quartet (Azica, 2012)
- Hard Tango with J. P. Jofre Quintet feat. Pablo Aslan, Nick Danielson, Lev “Ljova” Zhurbin Paquito D' Rivera & Fernando Otero (Round Star Entertainment, 2012, ASIN B00B5OUY8I)
- Piazzolla: desde estudios a tangos with violinist Elmira Darvarova (Urlicht AudioVisual, 2014, UAV-5991)
- Tango For Import with Importango (violinist Machiko Ozawa and guitarist Adam Tully) (Panoramic Recordings 2015)
- Adiós Nonino and other great Tangos by Piazzolla with violinist Elmira Darvarova (Affetto Records, 2016)

== Awards ==
- 2004: Best Solo Pianist of the New York City International Tango Competition
- 2004: Best Duo of the New York City International Tango Competition (with saxophonist Bernardo Monk)
- 2007: Grammy Award: best tango album (Te amo tango)
