= Phyllis Litoff =

American singer

- Born: December 3, 1938; New York City
- Died: July 7, 2002 (aged 63) Highmount, New York
- Genre: jazz
- Occupations: singer, impresario, artistic director

Phyllis Weisbart Litoff (3 December 1938 – 7 July 2002) was an American singer, jazz impresario, and artistic director. For many years she was the co-owner of Sweet Basil Jazz Club in Greenwich Village and was one of the founders of the Greenwich Village Jazz Festival. During the last nine years of her life, she was also the artistic director of the Belleayre Music Festival, where the main performing pavilion now bears her name.

== Biography ==
Born in New York City in 1938, Litoff graduated from The High School of Music & Art. Although a classically trained vocalist, she initially worked as a nightclub singer and in musical theatre as well as teaching voice. In 1981, she and her husband, Mel Litoff bought the well known Sweet Basil Jazz Club, where she was influential in the appearances of many prominent jazz musicians, including Sharon Freeman, Lester Bowie, Pharoah Sanders and Hamiett Bluiett. For a time in the early 1980s, she and her husband also owned the Lush Life Jazz Club on Bleecker Street. Her singing appearances became increasingly rare once she began working as a jazz impresario, although she did occasionally perform at Lush Life.

After the Litoffs sold the Sweet Basil Jazz Club in 1992, they volunteered to be the artistic directors of the fledgling Belleayre Music Festival and to expand the initially modest single concerts into an annual summer series. The festival became a prominent event with performances by some of the best-known names in music, ranging from jazz and pop to Broadway and classical.

Phyllis Litoff died of brain cancer at her home in Highmount, New York on 7 July 2002, aged 63.

== Sources ==
- Jazz Times, Volume 36, Issues 1–5, 2006, p. 24
- O'Donnell, Paul, "Beyond the Boardroom with Stewart Kohl". The Plain Dealer, 5 April 2008
