= Farewell (Gil Evans album) =

Live album by Gil Evans & the Monday Night Orchestra
- Released: 1988
- Recorded: December 1 and 22, 1986
- Venues: Sweet Basil, NYC
- Genre: Jazz
- Length: 62:02
- Labels: King/Electric Bird K32Y 6250; Evidence ECD 22031-2
- Producers: Horst Liepolt & Shigeyuki Kawashima

Gil Evans chronology
Anti-Heroes (1991)	Farewell (1988)

Farewell is a 1986 live album by jazz composer, arranger, conductor and pianist Gil Evans which was released posthumously. It was recorded by King Records (Japan) in New York in 1986 featuring Evans with his Monday Night Orchestra which included Hamiet Bluiett, Bill Evans and Johnny Coles, and originally released in Japan on the King label.

== Reception ==
Allmusic awarded the album 3 stars stating "The Gil Evans Monday Night orchestra ripped through the four cuts on this '86 session, often at a torrid pace. Even when they slowed things down, the solos were often done at fever-pitch levels".

Professional ratings
Review scores
Source	Rating
Allmusic	3/5 stars

== Track listing ==
All compositions by Gil Evans except where noted.

1. "Let the Juice Loose" (Bill Evans) – 12:01
2. "Your Number" – 14:12
3. "Waltz" – 19:55
4. "Little Wing" (Jimi Hendrix) – 15:54

Recorded at Sweet Basil in New York on December 1, 1986 (track 3) and December 22, 1986 (tracks 1, 2 & 4)

== Personnel ==
- Gil Evans – piano, electric piano, arranger, conductor
- Lew Soloff, Shunzo Ohno, Miles Evans – trumpet
- Johnny Coles – flugelhorn (track 1)
- Dave Bargeron – trombone
- Dave Taylor – bass trombone
- John Clark – French horn, hornette
- Chris Hunter – alto saxophone, soprano saxophone, flute
- Bill Evans – tenor saxophone, soprano saxophone, flute
- Hamiet Bluiett – baritone saxophone, clarinet, bass clarinet
- Hiram Bullock – guitar
- Pete Levin, Gil Goldstein – keyboards
- Mark Egan – electric bass
- Danny Gottlieb – drums
