= The Hardchargers =

Irish blues and Americana band

- Origin: Northern Ireland
- Genres: Blues
- Years active: 2009–present
- Labels: Independent
- Members: Chris Todd – pool of musicians: Ali MacKenzie; Jan Uhrin; Davy Kennedy; Peter Uhrin; Gerard O’Scolaidhe
- Past members: Dave Thompson
- Website: thehardchargers.co.uk

The Hardchargers are a blues and Americana band from Northern Ireland. Established in 2009 as a three-piece, the current lineup is "Lonesome" Chris Todd (guitars and lead vocals), with drums and bass guitar provided at any given performance by a selection of musicians including Ali MacKenzie, Jan Uhrin (bass guitar) and Davy Kennedy, Peter Uhrin, Gerard O’Scolaidhe (drums). The band has released three singles, an EP, one studio album and one live album. The band's original music has been likened to pre-WW2 Mississippi blues, Hill country blues, and artists such as Howlin' Wolf and Frankie Lee Sims.

== History ==
The Hardchargers were formed in 2009 by Chris Todd, Dave Thompson and Richard J. Hodgen.

In 2011 the band made its first release, extended play Bumpin′ and Grindin′. Three singles followed in 2013: "Fine & Filthy / Just Somebody's Friend","Spanner in Your Works / JoJo" and "Little Too Late / No Stone Unturned".

The band's debut album, Scarecrow, was recorded in Belfast in 2017, with support from a crowd-funding campaign and sponsors. During 2017 Todd accompanied eminent harmonica player Billy Boy Miskimmin (previously of The Yardbirds and Nine Below Zero) on tour across the UK. Before the launch of the album in December 2017, Thompson and Hodgen left the band, and the Todd recruited bassist Ali MacKenzie and drummer Davy Kennedy for the launch performance. Since then, the live lineup has been completed by members of a pool of musicians including MacKenzie and Kennedy, Jan and Peter Uhrin and Gerard O’Scolaidhe, occasionally joined by guest soloists that had performed on the album. The album was officially released on Market Square Records in January 2018.

The Scarecrow launch performance in December 2017 was recorded, and resulted in the live album And Now... Live at the Belfast Empire, released in June 2018.

== Lineup ==
- Chris Todd – lead vocals, guitars, mandolin (2009–present)
- Ali MacKenzie – bass guitar (2017–present)
- Davy Kennedy – drums (2017–present)
- Jan Uhrin – bass guitar (2017–present)
- Peter Uhrin – drums (2017–present)
- Gerard O’Scolaidhe – drums (2018–present)

=== Additional musicians ===
- Amanda Agnew – backing vocals (Scarecrow album)
- Sean Doone – banjo (Scarecrow album)
- Scott Flanigan – organ, piano (Scarecrow and And Now... Live at the Belfast Empire albums)
- Linley Hamilton – trumpet (Scarecrow album)

=== Former members ===
- Dave Thompson – bass guitar, double bass (2009–2017)

== Discography ==
The Hardchargers discography
- Studio albums: 1
- EPs: 1
- Live albums: 1
- Singles: 3

=== Studio albums ===
Year	Title	EP details	Peak chart positions
Year	Title	EP details	UK
2018	Scarecrow	Released: January 2018; Label: Market Square (MSMCD202); Format: CD, Download	—

=== Live albums ===
Year	Title	Album details	Peak chart positions
Year	Title	Album details	UK
2018	And Now... Live at the Belfast Empire (credited: Lonesome Chris Todd & The Hardchargers)	Released: June 2018; Format: CD, Download	—

=== Extended plays ===
Year	Title	EP details	Peak chart positions
Year	Title	EP details	UK
2011	Bumpin′ and Grindin′	Released: 2011; Format: CD, Download	—

=== Singles ===
Year	Title	Chart Positions		
Year	Title	UK	IRL	UK Indie
2013	"Fine & Filthy c/w Just Somebody's Friend"	—	—	—
2013	"Spanner in Your Works c/w JoJo"	—	—	—
2013	"Little Too Late c/w No Stone Unturned"	—	—	—
"—" denotes a title that did not chart.
