= Parabola (album) =

Studio album by Gil Evans Orchestra
- Released: 1979
- Recorded: July 29, 1978
- Studio: Trafalgar Studios, Rome
- Genre: Jazz
- Length: 76:32
- Label: Horo HDP 31-32
- Producer: Aldo Sinesio

Gil Evans chronology
Gil Evans Live at the Royal Festival Hall London 1978 (1979)	Parabola (1979)	Live at the Public Theater (New York 1980) (1980)

Parabola is a double album by jazz composer, arranger, conductor and pianist Gil Evans recorded in Italy in 1978 by Evans with an orchestra featuring Arthur Blythe, Steve Lacy and Lew Soloff and released on the Italian Horo label.

== Reception ==
Allmusic awarded the album 3½ stars.

Professional ratings
Review scores
Source	Rating
Allmusic	3.5/5 stars

== Track listing ==
All compositions by Gil Evans except as indicated

1. "Waltz" - 14:22
2. "Up from the Skies" (Jimi Hendrix) - 4:20
3. "Parabola" (Alan Shorter) - 11:52
4. "Stone Free" (Hendrix) - 21:58
5. "Variation" - 24:00

== Personnel ==
- Gil Evans - piano, electric piano, arranger, conductor
- Lew Soloff - trumpet
- Earl McIntyre - trombone
- Steve Lacy - soprano saxophone
- Arthur Blythe - alto saxophone, soprano saxophone
- Pete Levin - keyboards
- Don Pate - bass
- Noel McGhie - drums
