= Where Flamingos Fly =

Studio album by Gil Evans
- Released: 1981
- Recorded: 1971
- Genre: Jazz
- Length: 46:07
- Label: Artists House
- Producer: John Simon

Gil Evans chronology
| Live at the Public Theater (New York 1980) (1980, 1981) | Where Flamingos Fly (1981) | British Orchestra (1983) |

Where Flamingos Fly is an album by jazz composer, arranger, conductor and pianist Gil Evans, originally recorded in 1971 for Capitol Records but not released until 1981 as an LP on the Artists House label. It was reissued on CD in 1989 by A&M Records with different cover art (shown).

Performed by Evans with an orchestra featuring Billy Harper, Howard Johnson, Johnny Coles, and Don Preston.

== Reception ==
The Allmusic review by Scott Yanow awarded the album 2½ stars stating "This transitional LP features arranger Gil Evans shortly after he decided to put together a permanent big band. Although the music didn't come out until a decade later, it is actually quite worthwhile".

Professional ratings
Review scores
| Source | Rating |
|---|---|
| Allmusic | 2.5/5 stars |

== Track listing ==
All compositions arranged and conducted by Gil Evans.

1. "Zee Zee" (Gil Evans) – 10:58
2. "Naña" (Mario Telles, Moacir Santos, Yanna Coti) – 4:42
3. "Love Your Love" (Billy Harper) – 2:13
4. "Jelly Rolls" (Titled "Hotel Me" on original LP release) (Gil Evans) – 5:32
5. "Where Flamingos Fly" (Elthea Peale, Harold Courlander, John Benson Brooks) – 5:12
6. "El Matador" (Kenny Dorham) – 17:30
- Recorded in New York City in 1971.

== Personnel ==
- Gil Evans – piano, electric piano, tack piano, arranger, conductor
- Billy Harper – tenor saxophone, chimes
- Trevor Koehler – soprano saxophone, baritone saxophone (tracks 2–5)
- Johnny Coles, Hannibal Marvin Peterson, Stan Shafran (tracks 2–5) – trumpet
- Jimmy Knepper – trombone (tracks 2–5)
- Howard Johnson – tuba, baritone saxophone, flugelhorn
- Harry Lookofsky – tenor violin (tracks 1 & 6)
- Joe Beck – guitar, mandolin (tracks 1 & 6)
- Don Preston, Phil Davis (tracks 2–5) – synthesizer
- Bruce Johnson – guitar (tracks 2–5)
- Richard Davis – double bass (tracks 2–5)
- Herb Bushler (tracks 1 & 6), Bill Quinze (tracks 2–5) – electric bass
- Lenny White (tracks 1 & 6), Bruce Ditmas (tracks 2–5) – drums
- Sue Evans – percussion, marimba (tracks 1, 2 & 6)
- Airto Moreira, Flora Purim – vocals, percussion (tracks 2 & 6)
