= Edo Castro =

American jazz bassist and composer

Edo Castro (born May 24, 1957) is an American jazz bassist and composer.

== Biography ==
Born in San Francisco to mother Aida Saberi, Edo was an only child from Aida's first marriage. Later Aida remarried and had two more sons, Thomas & Ted Saberi. Edo attended Grattan Elementary, Herbert Hoover Junior High and J. Eugene McAteer High School, all in the city by the bay. Edo grew up during the tumultuous 1960s, where from an early age he was exposed to a myriad of musical styles, listening not only to rock and roll and R&B, but classical music, folk and jazz. His first Jazz albums were given to him by his late Uncle, recording engineer pioneer Reice Hamel. From these, Edo was first exposed to and smitten by the sounds of Vince Guaraldi, Hugh Masekela, Ahmad Jamal, Bill Evans, Ramsey Lewis and Paul Desmond. Edo initially studied piano and violin. But when a friend suggested that he try the electric bass, he knew he had found his instrument and did everything he could to immerse himself in it, seeking out and learning whatever he could from whoever would take the time to teach him.

== Musical education ==
Edo attended Humboldt State University in northern California. With less than three years playing bass, he bought an acoustic bass and auditioned for the music department at San Jose State University. While studying there, he met musicians from across the country. He was so inspired by their sound, he moved to Chicago in 1982, his uncle's hometown, to pursue his music education. He studied at DePaul University for a year, then completed his studies at the American Conservatory of Music, earning a Bachelor of Arts in 1987 with a focus on jazz studies and electric bass. During his time at the Conservatory in Chicago, Edo rose through the musical ranks, often recommended for gigs by his teachers. By the time Edo graduated from the Conservatory, Chicago magazine had noted him as “One of Chicago’s finest.” He continued to hone his craft in Chicago until 1990 when he returned to the Bay Area.

== Musical career ==
Edo's formative years were spent developing his skills in various funk, jazz and rock bands in the Bay Area and Chicago. In the late 1970s Edo studied and performed with Lou Harrison and Gamelan Si Betty. This led to one of his first compositions for American gamelan being published by Lou Harrison.

Since his return to the Bay Area in 1990, Edo has worked on 20 CD projects and has performed/recorded with David Amram, Mark Walker, Hassan Kahn, Pete Cosey, Roy Haynes, Fareed Haque, David Onderdonk, Ed Thigpen, Johnny Griffin, Joel Harrison, Jim Trompeter, Ian Doogle, Deborah Winters, Jill Knight, Paul Van Wageningen, Caroline Aiken, Dan Zinn, Bethany Pickens, Michael LaMacchia, Armando Peraza, Caren Armstrong, Percy Howard, Mike Molenda, Stuart Hamm, Lorn Leber, Michael Manring, Mark Egan, Yves Carbonne, and David Friesen.

Edo's fan base stretches the globe (with sales in Norway, Switzerland, Germany, France, Japan, Spain, Argentina, Italy and England) where he has found praise and recognition for his musical talents and compositions, and recognized internationally for his rare proficiency on several varieties of the extended-range bass. Edo is an endorser of Conklin Basses, Bee Basses and AccuGroove Cabinets,

== Instruments ==
Conklin - 7 string Fretted bass, 7 String Fretted Midi bass, 8 String Fretless bass Bee Bass - “Stinger” 7 string Fretless, 7 String Fretted Stinger bass and 7 String Groove Bee Fretless bass Watson 7 String Chambered Fretless bass Warwick “Triumph” 4 String electric Upright

== Discography ==
=== Passion Star Records ===
- Edo
- Phoenix
- Sacred Graffiti

=== As a sideman ===
- “Waiting For Rain" by Laura Wiley
- “Live" by Eric Doc Smith
- “K2” by Seth Elgart and Eric Doc Smith
- “A Pleasant Fiction” by Percy Howard and Meridiem
- “As Small As A World and Large As Alone” by HardBoiled Wonderland
- “Are We There Yet Momma” by Caroline Aiken
- “Everything” by Caren Armstrong
- “Imaginary Line” by Jill Knight
- “One More Day" by David Maloney
- “Bassics Compilation CD” Issue No 36 2003
- “Conklin Guitars Compilation CD”
- “Soul Threads” by Jen Spool
- “Quiet The Storm” by Ilene Adar
- “Lift” by Greg Lamboy
- “Blessing and a Curse” by Deborah Pardes
- “Bobo’s Country” by Deborah Pardes on compilation CD “Songs inspired by Literature II”
- “Party of One” by Donner Party
- “The Adventure of Franz Bonaventure” by Michael Lamacchia
- “Dark Comes Light” by Crowsong
- “Times Present, Times Past” by Coale Johnson
- “Suspiciously Blue” by Eva Jay Fortune Band
- “So Far Gone” by Eva Jay Fortune Band
- “Shiver” by Shiver “Atticus Finch” by Atticus Finch
- “Rockets to the New World” by David Sobel
- “Butterfly Blue” by Butterfly Blue
- “Louisiana Grail” by Enna Deer
- “Mass of the Living God” Joseph Herbert
- “Pathways” by Viewpoint
- “Lake Effect-City House” 45 RPM by Michael Mason

== Sources ==
- Chicago Magazine
- https://web.archive.org/web/20090210121255/http://extendedrangebassist.com/ERB_EC.htm
