= Sweet Basil Jazz Club =

Former jazz club in New York City

Coordinates: 40.7345°N 74.0024°W

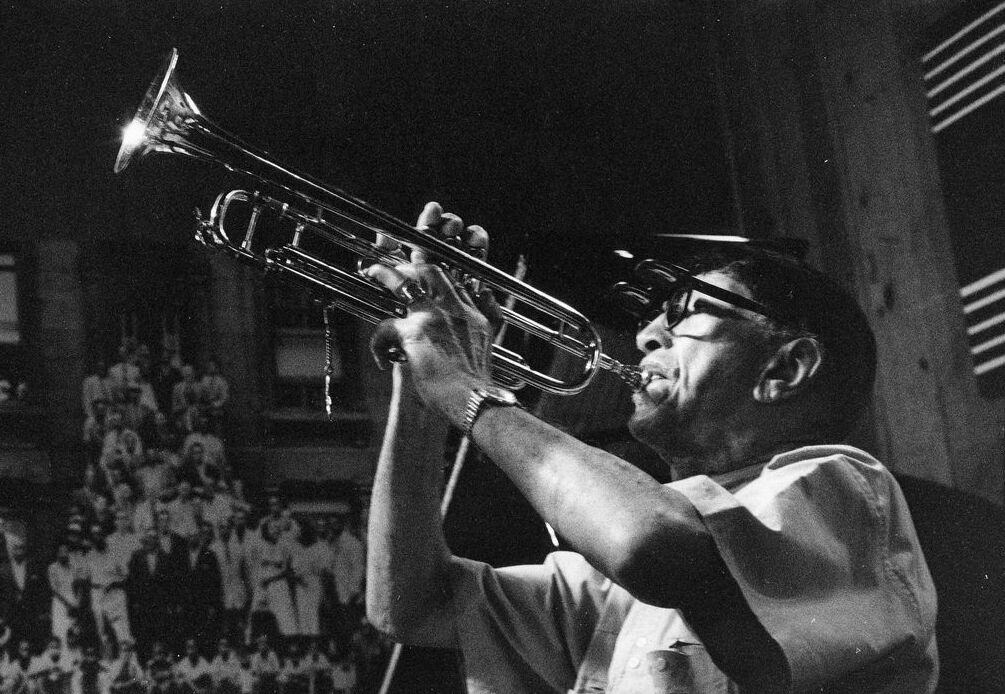
Doc Cheatham performing in Sweet Basil

Sweet Basil was a jazz club in New York City's Greenwich Village, located at 88 Seventh Avenue South. Founded in 1974 by Sharif Esmat, it was considered among the most prominent New York City jazz clubs of its day. Many jazz albums were recorded live at Sweet Basil, including Cecil Taylor's Iwontunwonsi, McCoy Tyner's Live at Sweet Basil (1989) and Solar: Live at Sweet Basil, and the Jean-Michel Pilc Trio's Together: Live at Sweet Basil. From 1981 to 1992, the club was owned by Phyllis Litoff and her husband Mel Litoff.

The club closed in April 2001.

== Recorded performances ==
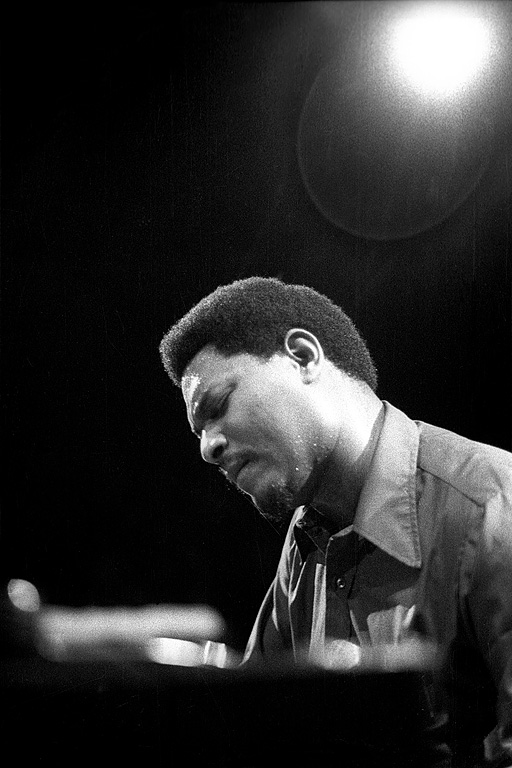
McCoy Tyner (1973)

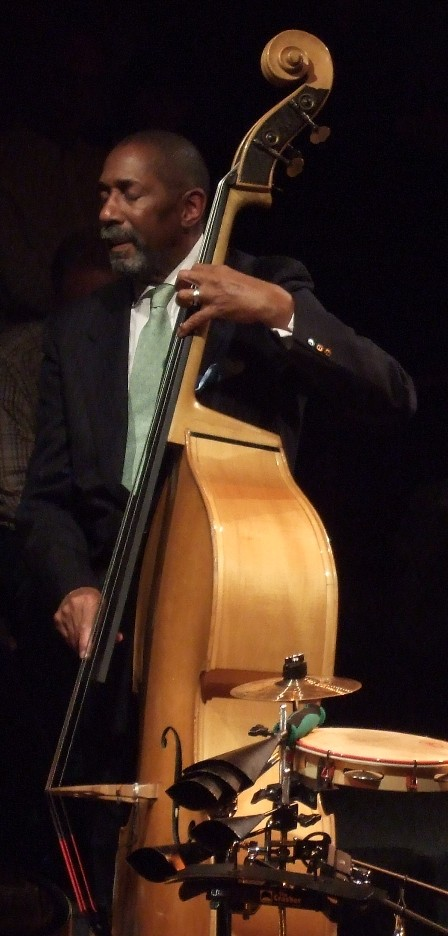
Ron Carter

Recorded performances at the club include:

- 1977 – Ron Carter: Piccolo (Milestone)
- 1977 – Junior Mance: Live at Sweet Basil (Flying Disk)
- 1977 – Cecil McBee Sextet with Chico Freeman: Music from the Source and Compassion (Enja)
- 1978 – Jim Hall/Red Mitchell (Artists House)
- 1981 – Chris Connor: Lover, Come Back to Me
- 1983 - Hamiet Bluiett: Bearer Of The Holy Flame (Black Fire – BF19931)
- 1983 – Abdullah Ibrahim with Carlos Ward: Live at Sweet Basil Vol. 1 (Ekapa)
- 1983 – Valery Ponomarev with Don Braden - John Hicks At Sweet Basil (Reservoir)
- 1984 – Leroy Jenkins: Urban Blues (Black Saint)
- 1984 – David Murray Big Band: Live at Sweet Basil Volume 1 & Live at Sweet Basil Volume 2 (Black Saint)
- 1984 – Gil Evans & The Monday Night Orchestra: Live at Sweet Basil, Live at Sweet Basil Vol. 2 (Gramavision)
- 1985 – Art Blakey & the Jazz Messengers Live At Sweet Basil (GNP Crescendo) (Paddle Wheel)
- 1985 – Art Blakey & the Jazz Messengers Hard Champion (Evidence)
- 1985 – Gunter Hampel New York Orchestra: Fresh Heat: Live at Sweet Basil (Birth) with Jeanne Lee, Perry Robinson, Mark Whitecage, Thomas Keyserling, Curtis Fowlkes, Bill Frisell, Bob Stewart, Marvin Smitty Smith u.a.
- 1985 – Art Blakey & the Jazz Messengers: Dr Jeckyle (Evidence)
- 1985 – Art Blakey & the Jazz Messengers: New Year's Eve At Sweet Basil (Evidence)
- 1985 – Art Blakey & the Jazz Messengers: Farewell (released 1990) (King)
- 1986 – Gil Evans & The Monday Night Orchestra: Bud and Bird, Farewell (Electric Bird/King)
- 1986 – The Jazztet (led by Art Farmer and Benny Golson): Back to the City, Real Time (Contemporary)
- 1986 – Terence Blanchard/Donald Harrison: Eric Dolphy & Booker Little Remembered Live at Sweet Basil, Vol. 1 & 2 (Evidence) with Mal Waldron, Richard Davis, Ed Blackwell
- 1987 – Mal Waldron: The Super Quartet Live at Sweet Basil (Paddle Wheel)
- 1988 – Paul Bley: Live at Sweet Basil (Soul Note)
- 1988 – Randy Brecker Quintet: Live at Sweet Basil (Sonet)
- 1988 – Sonny Greenwich: Live at Sweet Basil (Justin Time)
- 1988 – Oliver Jones: Cookin' at Sweet Basil (Justin Time Records)
- 1989 – Richard Davis: One for Frederick – Live at Sweet Basil (Hep)
- 1989 – McCoy Tyner: Live at Sweet Basil (King)
- 1989 – Uli Lenz/Cecil McBee/Joe Chambers: Live at Sweet Basil (Enja)
- 1990 – Nat Adderley: Autumn Leaves (Sweet Basil)
- 1990 - Nat Adderley: Work Song: Live at Sweet Basil (Sweet Basil)
- 1990 − Richard Davis and Friends live at Sweet Basil (Evidence) with Ricky Ford, Cecil Bridgewater, Roland Hanna, George Cables, Ronnie Burrage
- 1991 – Steve Grossman: In New York (Dreyfus)
- 1991 – Steve Lacy Sextet – Live at Sweet Basil (RCA Novus)
- 1991 – McCoy Tyner: Solar: Live at Sweet Basil (Sweet Basil Records)
- 1992 – Joanne Brackeen: Turnaround (Evidence)
- 1992 – Anders Bergcrantz: Live at Sweet Basil (Dragon/DIW)
- 1992 – Nick Brignola: Live At Sweet Basil - Fist Set (Reservoir)
- 1992 – Nick Brignola: Things Ain't What They Used to Be: Last Set At Sweet Basil (Reservoir)
- 1992 – The Enja Band live at Sweet Basil (Enja) with Willie Williams, Gust Tsilis, Uri Caine, Michael Formanek, Cecil Brooks III
- 1992 – Doc Cheatham: Live at Sweet Basil (Jazzology)
- 1992 – Art Farmer Quintet: Live at Sweet Basil (Evidence)
- 1992 – Dave Matthews / Manhattan Jazz Quintet: Manteca (Evidence)
- 1993 – Wolfgang Muthspiel Group: In & Out (Amadeo)
- 1995 – Cecil Taylor: Iwontunwonsi – Live at Sweet Basil (Sound Hills)
- 1995 – Cecil Taylor: Amewa – Live at Sweet Basil (Sound Hills)
- 1998 – Greg Osby: Banned in New York (Blue Note)
- 1999 – Michele Rosewoman: Guardians of the Light (Enja)
- 2000 – Cecil Brooks III/John Hicks: Live at Sweet Basil 2 (Savant)
