= Gil Evans Live at the Royal Festival Hall London 1978 =

Live album by Gil Evans
- Released: 1979
- Recorded: February 25, 1978
- Venue: Royal Festival Hall, London
- Genre: Jazz
- Length: 37:40
- Label: RCA PL 25209
- Producer: Gil Evans, Peter Bould, Peter Ball

Gil Evans chronology
There Comes a Time (album) (1976)	Gil Evans Live at the Royal Festival Hall London 1978 (1979)	Parabola (1979)

Gil Evans Live at the Royal Festival Hall London 1978 is a live album by jazz composer, arranger, conductor and pianist Gil Evans recorded in London in 1978 by Evans with an orchestra featuring Arthur Blythe, George Adams, and Lew Soloff and released on RCA label.

== Reception ==
Allmusic awarded the album 2 stars.

Professional ratings
Review scores
Source	Rating
Allmusic	2/5 stars

== Track listing ==
All compositions by Gil Evans except as indicated

1. "Angel" (Jimi Hendrix) - 5:05
2. "Parabola" (Alan Shorter) - 6:45
3. "Orange Was The Colour of Her Dress then Silk Blue" (Charles Mingus) - 7:00
4. "Stone Free" (Hendrix) - 10:20
5. "Fugue from Concorde" (John Lewis) - 8:30
6. "Blues Inc. Medley: Cheryl/Birdhead/Relaxing at Camarillo" (Charlie Parker)
7. "Epilogue"

== Personnel ==
- Gil Evans - piano, electric piano, arranger, conductor
- Lew Soloff - trumpet, piccolo trumpet
- Ernie Royal - trumpet, flugelhorn
- Hannibal Marvin Peterson - trumpet, orchestra chimes
- John Clark - French horn, guitar
- Bob Stewart - tuba, flugelhorn
- Arthur Blythe - alto saxophone, soprano saxophone
- George Adams - tenor saxophone, soprano saxophone, bass clarinet, alto flute
- David Sanborn - alto saxophone, soprano saxophone, flute
- Pete Levin - Minimoog, clavinet
- Masabumi Kikuchi - electric organ
- Herb Bushler - bass
- Sue Evans - drums, timpani, percussion
