= The Gil Evans Orchestra Plays the Music of Jimi Hendrix =

Studio album by Gil Evans Orchestra
- Released: 1974
- Recorded: June 11–13, 1974
- Genres: Jazz rock, big band
- Length: 74:33 Reissue with bonus tracks
- Label: RCA CPL1-0667
- Producer: Gil Evans

Gil Evans chronology
Svengali (1973)	The Gil Evans Orchestra Plays the Music of Jimi Hendrix (1974)	Montreux Jazz Festival '74 (1975)

The Gil Evans Orchestra Plays the Music of Jimi Hendrix is an album of Jimi Hendrix's compositions by jazz composer, conductor and pianist Gil Evans. The music was arranged by Evans and members of his orchestra. The album was recorded in 1974 and performed by Evans with an orchestra featuring David Sanborn, Howard Johnson, Billy Harper, and John Abercrombie. The album was re-released with additional tracks on CD in 1988.

== Reception ==
The Allmusic review by Scott Yanow awarded the album 4½ stars stating "Evans' arrangements uplift many of Hendrix's more blues-oriented compositions and create a memorable set that is rock-oriented but retains the improvisation and personality of jazz".

Professional ratings
Review scores
Source	Rating
Allmusic	4.5/5 stars
The Rolling Stone Jazz Record Guide	3/5 stars
The Penguin Guide to Jazz Recordings	3.5/4 stars

== Track listing ==
All compositions by Jimi Hendrix

1. "Angel" – 4:09 (arr. by Tom Malone)
2. "Crosstown Traffic / Little Miss Lover" – 6:32 (arr. by Tom Malone)
3. "Castles Made of Sand (arr. by Gil Evans) / Foxey Lady" (arr. by Warren Smith) – 11:26
4. "Up from the Skies" [Take 1 – Original Master] – 9:16 (arr. by Gil Evans)
5. "1983... (A Merman I Should Turn to Be)" – 7:32 (arr. by David Horowitz)
6. "Voodoo Child" – 5:02 (arr. by Howard Johnson)
7. "Gypsy Eyes" – 3:40 (arr. by Trevor Koehler)
8. "Little Wing" – 5:33 Bonus track on CD reissue (arr. by Gil Evans)
9. "Up from the Skies" [Take 2 – Alternate Take] – 9:53 (arr. by Gil Evans) Bonus track on CD reissue
- Recorded in RCA's Studio B in New York City on 11 June (tracks 4 & 9), 12 June (tracks 2, 6 & 7) and 13 June (tracks 1, 3 & 5), 1974, and 14, 25 & 28 April 1975 (track 8)

== Personnel ==
- Gil Evans – piano, electric piano, arranger, conductor
- Hannibal Marvin Peterson – trumpet, vocals
- Lew Soloff – trumpet, flugelhorn, piccolo trumpet
- Peter Gordon – French horn
- Pete Levin – French horn, synthesizer
- Tom Malone – trombone, bass trombone, flute, synthesizer, arranger
- Howard Johnson – tuba, bass clarinet, electric bass, arranger
- David Sanborn – alto saxophone, soprano saxophone, flute
- Billy Harper – tenor saxophone, flute
- Trevor Koehler – tenor saxophone, alto saxophone, flute, baritone saxophone, soprano saxophone, arranger
- John Abercrombie, Ryo Kawasaki – electric guitar
- Keith Loving – guitar
- Don Pate – bass
- Michael Moore – electric bass, acoustic bass
- Bruce Ditmas – drums
- Warren Smith – vibraphone, marimba, chimes, latin percussion
- Sue Evans – drums, congas, percussion
