= Hannibal Lokumbe =

American jazz trumpeter (born 1948)

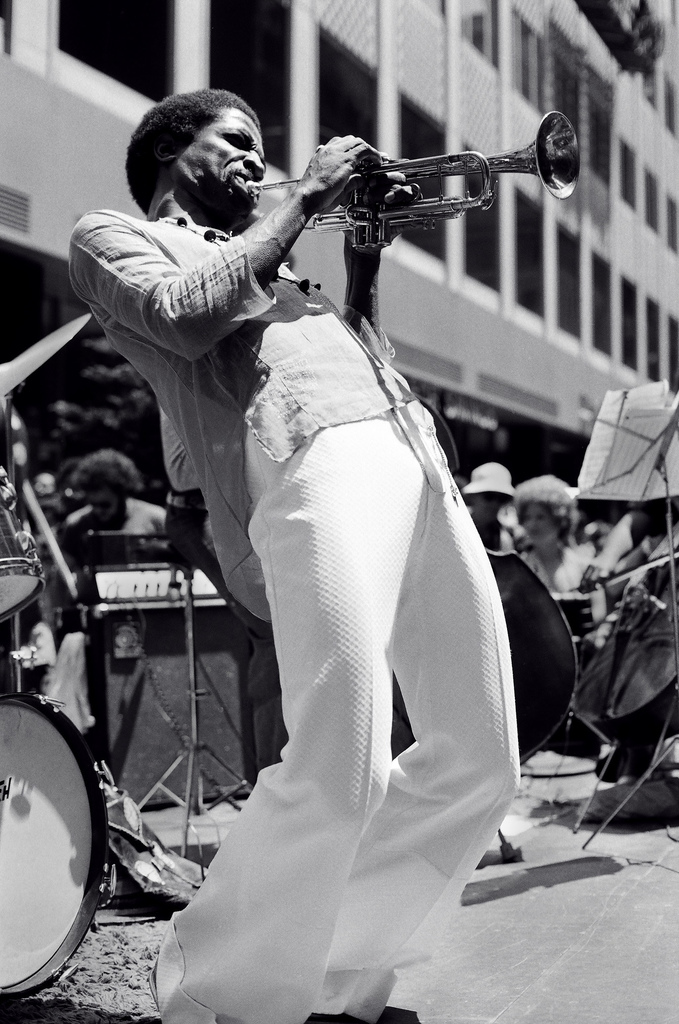
- Peterson in 1976

Background information
- Born: Marvin Peterson; November 11, 1948 (age 77); Smithville, Texas, U.S.
- Genre: Free jazz
- Occupation: Musician
- Instrument: Trumpet
- Labels: Enja, MPS, Baystate
- Website: hanniballokumbe.com

Hannibal Lokumbe (born Marvin Peterson on November 11, 1948) is an American composer and jazz trumpeter.

== Career ==
A native of Smithville, Texas, United States, he is sometimes known by the name "Hannibal". He attended high school in Texas City, Texas. In the late 1960s, he attended North Texas State University for two years, then moved to New York City and went on tour with Rahsaan Roland Kirk. He became a member of the Gil Evans orchestra, an association that lasted through the 1980s, and worked with Roy Haynes and Pharoah Sanders. As the leader of the Sunrise Orchestra, he played koto and trumpet. His debut solo album, Children of the Fire, was released in 1974.

Lokumbe coauthored a biography of his life with the author, artist, and cultural anthropologist Lauren Coyle Rosen, called Hannibal Lokumbe: Spiritual Soundscapes of Music, Life, and Liberation (Columbia University Press, 2024). The book has been nominated for the Pulitzer Prize in Biography, the National Book Award, and the National Book Critics Circle Award.

He has also published three volumes of poetry: The Ripest of My Fruits; Trilogy: Freedom Dance Cycle; and Love Poems to God.

== Awards and honors ==
- Fellow Award in Music from United States Artists, 2009
- Harlem Jazz Hall of Fame, Lifetime Inductee

== Discography ==
=== As leader ===
- Marvin Peterson and the Soulmasters in Concert (Century, 1969)
- Children of the Fire (Sunrise, 1974)
- Hannibal (BASF/MPS, 1975)
- In Antibes (Enja, 1977)
- In Berlin (MPS, 1977)
- Naima (Eastworld, 1978)
- The Light (Eastworld, 1978)
- Live in Lausanne (Eastworld, 1978)
- The Tribe (John Hammond World of Jazz 1978)
- Tribute (Eastworld, 1979)
- The Universe Is Not for Sale (Smackdab, 1980)
- The Angels of Atlanta (Enja, 1981)
- Poem Song (Mole, 1981)
- More Sightings (Enja, 1984)
- Visions of a New World (Atlantic, 1989)
- Kiss On the Bridge (Ear-Rational, 1990)
- Crossing (Ear-Rational, 1991)
- One with the Wind (Muse, 1994)
- African Portraits (Teldec, 1995)
- Dear Mrs. Parks (Naxos, 2009)
- Can You Hear God Crying? (Naxos, 2014)

=== As sideman ===
With Andrew Cyrille

- My Friend Louis (DIW, 1992)

With Richard Davis

- Epistrophy & Now's the Time (Muse, 1972)
- Dealin' (Muse, 1973)

With Gil Evans

- Where Flamingos Fly (Artists House, 1971 [1989])
- Masabumi Kikuchi + Gil Evans (Philips, 1972); Japanese big band directed by Gil Evans
- Svengali (Atlantic, 1973)
- The Gil Evans Orchestra Plays the Music of Jimi Hendrix (RCA, 1974)
- There Comes a Time (RCA, 1975)
- Priestess (Antilles, 1977)
- Gil Evans Live at the Royal Festival Hall London 1978 (RCA, 1979)
- Live at the Public Theater (New York 1980) (Trio, 1981)
- Live at Sweet Basil (Gramavision, 1984 [1986])
- Live at Sweet Basil Vol. 2 (1984)

With Frank Foster

- The Loud Minority (Mainstream, 1972)

With Kip Hanrahan

- Desire Develops An Edge (Yellowbird, 1983)

With Billy Hart

- Enchance (Horizon, 1977)

With Roy Haynes

- Hip Ensemble (Mainstream, 1971)
- Senyah (Mainstream, 1973)

With Elvin Jones

- Live at the Village Vanguard (Enja, 1968)

With Eric Kloss

- Essence (Muse, 1974)

With Grachan Moncur III & Jazz Composer's Orchestra

- Echoes of Prayer (JCOA, 1974 [1975])

With New York Unit

- Now's the Time (Paddle Wheel, 1992)
- Akari (Apollon, 1994)

With Don Pullen

- Tomorrow's Promises (Atlantic, 1977)

With Pharoah Sanders

- Black Unity (Impulse!, 1971)
- Live at the East (Impulse!, 1972)
- Village of the Pharoahs (Impulse!, 1973)
