= Live at Sweet Basil (Gil Evans album) =

Live album by Gil Evans & the Monday Night Orchestra
- Released: 1985
- Recorded: August 20 & 27, 1984
- Venue: Sweet Basil, NYC
- Genre: Jazz
- Length: 71:27
- Label: King/Electric Bird K23P6355-6; Gramavision 18-8610-1
- Producer: Horst Liepolt & Shigeyuki Kawashima

Gil Evans chronology
British Orchestra (1983)	Live at Sweet Basil (1985)	Live at Sweet Basil Vol. 2 (1987)

Live at Sweet Basil is a live album by jazz composer, arranger, conductor and pianist Gil Evans, and recorded by King Records (Japan) in New York in 1984. It featured Evans with his Monday Night Orchestra, which included George Adams, Howard Johnson, and Lew Soloff. The album was originally released in the US on the Gramavision label.

== Background ==
Gil Evans' Monday night marathon sessions at "Sweet Basil Jazz Club" started as a workshop in April 1983, to select players and do rehearsals in preparation for his Japan tour in May. The performances at the workshop drew attention and a good reputation, and the club asked Evans to continue to perform periodically on Mondays after the Japan tour.

== Reception ==
AllMusic awarded the album 2 stars, stating, "It may not have been "cool," but it was most assuredly great jazz".

Professional ratings
Review scores
Source	Rating
Allmusic	2/5 stars

== Track listing ==
1. "Parabola" (Alan Shorter) - 18:40
2. "Voodoo Child (Slight Return)" (Jimi Hendrix) - 7:21
3. "Orange Was the Color of Her Dress, Then Silk Blue" (Charles Mingus) - 6:15
4. "Prince of Darkness" (Herbie Hancock) - 5:50
5. "Blues in "C": John's Memory/Cheryl/Bird Feathers/Relaxin' at Camarillo" (Charlie Parker) - 24:42
6. "Goodbye Pork Pie Hat" (Mingus) - 9:30 Omitted from CD reissue
7. "Up from the Skies" (Hendrix) - 8:39

== Personnel ==
- Gil Evans - piano, electric piano, arranger, conductor
- Lew Soloff, Hannibal Marvin Peterson, Shunzo Ohno, Miles Evans - trumpet
- George Adams - tenor saxophone
- Chris Hunter - alto saxophone
- Howard Johnson - tuba, baritone saxophone, bass clarinet
- Tom Malone - trombone
- Hiram Bullock - guitar
- Pete Levin - synthesizer
- Mark Egan - electric bass
- Adam Nussbaum - drums
- Mino Cinelu - percussion
