= There Comes a Time (album) =

Studio album by Gil Evans and His Orchestra
- Released: 1976
- Recorded: March – June 1975
- Genre: Jazz
- Length: 64:34 Reissue with bonus tracks
- Label: RCA APL1-1057
- Producer: Gil Evans & Anita Evans

Gil Evans chronology
Montreux Jazz Festival '74 (1975)	There Comes a Time (1976)	Gil Evans Live at the Royal Festival Hall London 1978 (1979)

There Comes a Time is an album by the jazz composer, arranger, conductor and pianist Gil Evans, recorded in 1975 and performed by Evans with an orchestra featuring David Sanborn, Howard Johnson, Billy Harper and Ryo Kawasaki. The album was re-released with an altered tracklist on CD in 1988.

== Reception ==
Professional ratings
Review scores
Source	Rating
AllMusic	4/5 stars
The Rolling Stone Jazz Record Guide	4/5 stars
The Virgin Encyclopedia of Jazz	4/5 stars
The Penguin Guide to Jazz	3/4 stars

In a review for AllMusic, Scott Yanow wrote: "overall the music... is quite rewarding, it's a creative big band fusion that expertly mixes together acoustic and electric instruments. This was one of Gil Evans' last truly great sets."

Critic Richard Williams, writing for The Guardian, called the album an "immortal recording," one "often based on no more than a scrap of material coaxed into shimmering, multifaceted life."

== Track listing ==
All compositions by Gil Evans except as indicated

1. "King Porter Stomp" (Jelly Roll Morton) – 3:48
2. "There Comes a Time" (Tony Williams) – 16:10 Re-edited 14:23 version included on CD reissue
3. "Makes Her Move" – 1:42
4. "Little Wing – 5:33 Omitted from CD reissue
5. "The Meaning of the Blues" (Bobby Troup, Lee Worth) – 5:51 Unedited 20:01 version included on CD reissue
6. "Aftermath the Fourth Movement Children of the Fire" (Hannibal Marvin Peterson) – 5:45 Omitted from CD reissue
7. "Joy Spring" (Clifford Brown) – 2:19 Bonus track on CD reissue
8. "So Long" – 16:37 Bonus track on CD reissue
9. "Buzzard Variation" – 2:35 Bonus track on CD reissue
10. "Anita's Dance" – 2:55
- Recorded in RCA's Studio B in New York City on March 6 (tracks 2 & 7–9), April 11 (tracks 1, 3, 5 & 10) and April 14 (tracks 4 & 6) with additional recording on April 25, June 10 and 12, 1975

== Personnel ==
- Gil Evans – piano, electric piano, arranger, conductor
- Hannibal Marvin Peterson – trumpet, koto, vocals
- Ernie Royal, Lew Soloff – trumpet, flugelhorn, piccolo trumpet
- John Clark, Peter Gordon – French horn
- Tom Malone – trombone, bass trombone, tuba, synthesizer
- Joe Daley, Bob Stewart – tuba
- Howard Johnson – tuba, bass clarinet, baritone saxophone, trombone
- David Sanborn – alto saxophone, soprano saxophone, flute
- George Adams, Billy Harper – tenor saxophone, flute
- David Horowitz – electric piano, synthesizer, electronic organ
- Pete Levin – synthesizer
- Joe Gallivan – synthesizer, guitar, steel guitar, percussion, congas
- Ryo Kawasaki, Paul Metzke – guitar, pedals
- Herb Bushler – electric bass
- Bruce Ditmas, Tony Williams – drums
- Sue Evans – congas, timpani, percussion, celeste, cowbell
- Warren Smith – mallet percussion, bongos
