= Svengali (Gil Evans album) =

Live album by Gil Evans
- Released: 1973
- Recorded: May 30, 1973 at Trinity Church; June 30, 1973 at Philharmonic Hall
- Venue: Trinity Church, NYC; Philharmonic Hall, NYC
- Genre: Jazz
- Length: 40:41
- Label: Atlantic
- Producer: Kenneth Noland

Gil Evans chronology
Masabumi Kikuchi with Gil Evans (1972)	Svengali (1973)	The Gil Evans Orchestra Plays the Music of Jimi Hendrix (1974)

Svengali is a live album by jazz composer, arranger, conductor and pianist Gil Evans, recorded in 1973 by Evans with an orchestra featuring Ted Dunbar, Howard Johnson, David Sanborn, Billy Harper, Richard Williams, Trevor Koehler, and Hannibal Marvin Peterson. The name of the album is an anagram of Gil Evans.

== Reception ==
The Allmusic review by Scott Yanow awarded the album 4½ stars stating "one of Gil Evans's finest recordings of the 1970s. He expertly blended together acoustic and electronic instruments... Evans's arrangements are quite inventive and innovative. Rarely would he be so successful in balancing written and improvised sections in his later years".

DownBeat reviewer Chuck Mitchell gave the release 5 stars. Mitchell wrote, "Evans is a sonic sorcerer whose vision is conjured out of eerily shifting melodic landscapes, flights of harmonic fantasy, and ambiguous, seductive rhythmic settings".

Professional ratings
Review scores
Source	Rating
Allmusic	4.5/5 stars
The Rolling Stone Jazz Record Guide	4/5 stars
The Penguin Guide to Jazz Recordings	3/4 stars
DownBeat	5/5 stars

== Track listing ==
All compositions arranged and conducted by Gil Evans.

1. "Thoroughbred" (Billy Harper) - 6:33
2. "Blues In Orbit" (George Russell) - 10:15
3. "Eleven" (Miles Davis, Gil Evans) - 1:42
4. "Cry of Hunger" (Harper) - 10:18
5. "Summertime" (George Gershwin, Ira Gershwin, DuBose Heyward) - 3:58
6. "Zee Zee" (Evans) - 7:37

- Recorded live in 1973 at Trinity Church, New York, NY except "Zee Zee" which was recorded at Philharmonic Hall, New York, NY.

== Personnel ==
- Gil Evans - Piano, Electric piano
- David Sanborn - Alto saxophone
- Billy Harper - Tenor saxophone
- Trevor Koehler - Baritone saxophone, Soprano saxophone, Flute
- Richard Williams - Trumpet
- Tex Allen - Trumpet (except on "Zee Zee")
- Marvin Peterson - Trumpet (on "Zee Zee")
- Sharon Freeman - French horn
- Pete Levin - French horn
- Joseph Daley - Trombone, Tuba
- Howard Johnson - Tuba, Baritone saxophone, Flugelhorn
- David Horowitz - synthesizers
- Ted Dunbar - Guitar
- Herb Bushler - Electric bass
- Bruce Ditmas - drums
- Sue Evans - Percussion
