= Linley Hamilton =

Dr. Linley Hamilton MBE MBE
- Born: 17 March 1965 (age 61); Belfast, Northern Ireland
- Genres: Jazz
- Instruments: Trumpet, flugelhorn
- Labels: Teddy D Records, LYTE Records, Whirlwind
- Website: linleyhamilton.com

Linley Patrick Hamilton (born 17 March 1965) is a musician, educator and broadcaster from Northern Ireland. He is a Dr. of Jazz Performance and retired Lecturer of Music at Ulster University Magee. He presented Jazz World with Linley Hamilton on BBC Radio Ulster and leads his own jazz quintet playing trumpet and flugelhorn. Hamilton's associations as a session musician include Van Morrison, Jacqui Dankworth, Andrew Strong and Paul Brady. He has 6 studio albums and is curator of the internationally acclaimed Jazz venue, Magy’s Farm in County Down, Northern Ireland. His current band is made up of Adam Nussbaum drums, Mark Egan bass, Cian Boylan piano and Derek DOC O’Connor. His wife Maggie is an author specialising in nature writing and they host a mini-Donkey and lamb Sanctuary at their farm.

== Discography ==
- Up To Now (2003)
- Taylor Made (2011)
- In Transition (2014)
- Making other Arrangements (2018)
- For the Record (2020)
- Ginger’s Hollow (2023)

=== Featured on ===
- Oh What a World (Paul Brady) (2000)
- Songbook (Paul Brady) (2002)
- Detour Ahead (Jacqui Dankworth) (2003)
- Hawana Way (Paul Brady) (2003)
- Two of Us (Dana Masters)
- Shadows Linger (John Donegan Sextet)
- In Another Lifetime (Swift)
