= Live at Sweet Basil (Paul Bley album) =

Live album by Paul Bley Group
- Released: 1988
- Recorded: March 1–6, 1988
- Genre: Jazz
- Length: 55:21
- Label: Soul Note
- Producer: Giovanni Bonandrini

Paul Bley chronology
Solo (1987)	Live at Sweet Basil (1988)	Solo Piano (1988)

Live at Sweet Basil is a live album by Canadian jazz pianist Paul Bley recorded in 1988 at the Sweet Basil Jazz Club and released on the Italian Soul Note label.

== Reception ==
The Allmusic review awarded the album 3 stars.

Professional ratings
Review scores
Source	Rating
Allmusic	3/5 stars
The Penguin Guide to Jazz Recordings	3/4 stars

== Track listing ==
All compositions by Paul Bley except as indicated

1. "Blues Waltz" – 9:03
2. "Lover Man" (Jimmy Davis, Ram Ramirez, James Sherman) – 15:29
3. "When Will the Blues Leave?" (Ornette Coleman) – 11:00
4. "My Old Flame" (Sam Coslow, Arthur Johnston) – 11:10
5. "My Foolish Heart" (Ned Washington, Victor Young) – 8:39

- Recorded at Sweet Basil in New York City on March 1–6, 1988.

== Personnel ==
- Paul Bley — piano
- John Abercrombie — guitar
- Red Mitchell — bass
- Barry Altschul — drums
