= John Clark (musician) =

American jazz horn player and composer

Background information
- Birth name: John Trevor Clark
- Born: 21 September 1944 (age 80); Brooklyn, New York, U.S.
- Genres: Jazz
- Occupation(s): Musician, composer
- Instrument: French horn
- Labels: Hidden Meaning
- Website: www.hmmusic.com

John Clark is an American jazz horn player and composer. In Allmusic, Clark is described as "possibly the most fluent jazz French horn soloist since the great Julius Watkins in the 1950s."

== Biography ==
John Clark was born in Brooklyn and grew up in Rochester, New York. In 1966 he received a B.A.from the University of Rochester, where he also studied horn with Verne Reynolds at the Eastman School of Music. From 1967 until 1971 he played in the United States Coast Guard Band. Clark received a M.M. degree (with honors) from the New England Conservatory of Music in 1973. He studied composition and improvisation with Jaki Byard, Ran Blake, and George Russell; and horn with James Stagliano, Thomas Newell, and Paul Ingraham. In 1991 he received a patent for the "hornette," an instrument with the same range as a French Horn but with a forward-facing bell for greater projection. He taught at the State University of New York at Purchase from 2001 until 2008, subsequently moving to faculty at Manhattan School of Music.

== Performance work ==
Clark has performed or recorded with a wide variety of musicians, including in jazz: Gary Bartz, Carla Bley, Ornette Coleman, Gil Evans, John Faddis, Johnny Griffin, Dave Grusin, Jerome Harris, Jim Hall, Jimmy Heath, Anthony Jackson, Leroy Jenkins, Howard Johnson, Oliver Lake, Joe Lovano, Pat Metheny, Grachan Moncur, Gerry Mulligan, Jaco Pastorius, Rachel Z, Paquito D'Rivera, Mike Richmond, John Scofield, Frank Sinatra, Lew Soloff, Spyro Gyra, David Taylor, Toots Thielemans, the Turtle Island String Quartet, McCoy Tyner, Glen Velez, Paul Winter Consort, Akiko Yano, and the Jazz at Lincoln Center Orchestra.

Outside of jazz, he has worked with the Aspen Wind Quintet, Ashford and Simpson, the Brooklyn Philharmonic, the Fugees, Isaac Hayes, Billy Joel, B. B. King, LL Cool J, Joni Mitchell, Linda Ronstadt, Diana Ross, Carly Simon, Sting, Speculum Musicae, and the Trans-Siberian Orchestra.

He has performed as a studio musician for many films, including Mission to Mars, Fargo, and Pocahontas.

== Awards ==
- Down Beat Critics' Poll winner, 1979–1982
- National Academy of Recording Arts and Sciences Award for Most Valuable Player in Recording Field, 1986

== Discography ==
=== As leader ===
- 1980 Song of Light (Hidden Meaning)
- 1981 Faces (ECM)
- 1992 Il Suono (CMP)
- 1997 I Will (Postcards)
- 2003 Confluence (Hidden Meaning)
- 2015 The Odd Couple Quintet +1
- 2016 Sonus Inenarrabilis (Mulatta)

=== As sideman ===
With Franco Ambrosetti

- Wings (Enja, 1984)

With Gil Evans

- There Comes a Time (RCA, 1976)
- Gil Evans Live at the Royal Festival Hall London 1978 (RCA, 1979)
- Live at the Public Theater (New York 1980) Vol.1 (Trio, 1980)
- Live at the Public Theater (New York 1980) Vol.2 (Trio, 1981)
- Bud and Bird (King/Electric Bird, 1987)
- Farewell (King/Electric Bird, 1992)

With Benny Green

- The Place To Be (Blue Note, 1994)

With Dave Grusin

- Homage to Duke (GRP, 1993)

With Billy Harper

- Soul of an Angel (Metropolitan, 2000)

With Jimmy Heath

- New Picture (Landmark, 1985)

With Leroy Jenkins

- Mixed Quintet (Black Saint, 1979)

With Jimmy Knepper

- I Dream Too Much (Soul Note, 1984)

With Joe Lovano

- Rush Hour (Blue Note, 1994)

With Grachan Moncur III

- Exploration (Capri, 2004)

With Bob Stewart

- Goin' Home (JMT, 1989)

With Sting

- If on a Winter's Night... (Deutsche Grammophon, 2009)

With Stanley Turrentine

- Nightwings (Fantasy, 1977)

== Bibliography ==
- 1993 – Exercises for Jazz French Horn (Hidden Meaning Music)
