= Live at Sweet Basil (McCoy Tyner album) =

Live album by McCoy Tyner
- Released: 1989
- Recorded: May 19 & 20, 1989
- Venue: Sweet Basil Jazz Club, NYC
- Genre: Jazz
- Length: 92:07
- Label: King
- Producer: Horst Liepolt

McCoy Tyner chronology
Uptown/Downtown (1988)	Live at Sweet Basil (1989)	Things Ain't What They Used to Be (1989)

Professional ratings
Review scores
Source	Rating
Allmusic	4.5/5 stars

Live at Sweet Basil is a 1989 live album by McCoy Tyner released on the Japanese King label. It was recorded in May 1989 and features performances by Tyner's trio which included bassist Avery Sharpe and drummer Aaron Scott at the Sweet Basil Jazz Club in New York City. The Allmusic review by Scott Yanow calls the album "a definitive look at McCoy Tyner in the late '80s".

== Track listing ==
1. "Crescent" (Coltrane) – 10:29
2. "Monk's Dream" (Monk) – 9:35
3. "Darn That Dream" (DeLange, Van Heusen) – 8:18
4. "Sweet Basil Swing" – 6:30
5. "'Round Midnight" (Monk) – 9:51
6. "Yesterdays" (Harbach, Kern) – 9:55
7. "Rio" – 8:47
8. "Don't Blame Me" (Fields, McHugh) – 4:20
9. "Just in Time" (Comden, Green, Styne) – 10:45
10. "Naima" (Coltrane) – 2:51
11. "Will You Still Be Mine?" (Adair, Dennis) – 10:46

All compositions by McCoy Tyner except as indicated
- Recorded at Sweet Basil, NYC, May 19 & 20, 1989.

== Personnel ==
- McCoy Tyner – piano
- Avery Sharpe – bass
- Aaron Scott – drums
