= Live at the Public Theater (New York 1980) =

Live album by Gil Evans
- Released: Volume 1: 1980; Volume 2: 1981
- Recorded: February 8–9, 1980
- Venues: The Public Theater, NYC
- Genre: Jazz
- Length: 37:40
- Labels: LP: Trio; CD: Crown/Break Time
- Producer: Masabumi Kikuchi

Gil Evans chronology
Anti-Heroes (1980)	Live at the Public Theater (New York 1980) (1980)	Where Flamingos Fly (1981)

Live at the Public Theater (New York 1980) is a live album by jazz composer, arranger, conductor and pianist Gil Evans recorded in New York in 1980 by Evans with an orchestra featuring Arthur Blythe, Hamiet Bluiett, and Lew Soloff and originally released from Japanese Trio label in two volumes. Integrated version was first released in 1986 from Japanese Crown Record's Break Time label as 2xCDs album, and one track was added in the release from Japanese Venus Records label of 1993.

== Reception ==
AllMusic awarded the first volume 3 stars stating "One of arranger Gil Evans's main talents was his ability to fuse diverse, unique performers into a unified ensemble. He accomplishes that... even if his presence is felt more than heard". They gave the second volume 2½ stars noting " Although the end results do not quite live up to the potential of this unique ensemble, there are plenty of colorful moments".

Professional ratings
Review scores
Source	Rating
AllMusic	Vol. 1
AllMusic	Vol. 2
The Penguin Guide to Jazz Recordings	Vols. 1 & 2

== Track listing ==
All compositions by Gil Evans except where noted.

Volume 1 (disc 1):

1. "Anita's Dance" – 17:11
2. "Jelly Roll" – 4:48
3. "Alyrio" – 3:14
4. "Variation on the Misery" – 6:20
5. "Gone, Gone, Gone" (George Gershwin) – 7:51
6. "Up from the Skies" (Jimi Hendrix) – 4:19

Volume 2 (disc 2):

1. "Copenhagen Sight" – 6:27
2. "Zee Zee" – 11:02
3. "Sirhan's Blues" (John Benson Brooks) – 7:41
4. "Stone Free" (Hendrix) – 14:14
5. "Orange Was the Color of Her Dress, Then Blue Silk" (Charles Mingus) – 9:33
6. "Listen To The Silence" – 8:57 – added in disc 2 of Venus Records [1993] version and after releases

== Personnel ==
- Gil Evans – electric piano, arranger, conductor
- Lew Soloff, Jon Faddis, Hannibal Marvin Peterson – trumpet
- John Clark – French horn
- George Lewis – trombone
- Arthur Blythe – alto saxophone, soprano saxophone
- Hamiet Bluiett – baritone saxophone, alto flute
- Dave Bargeron – trombone, tuba
- Masabumi Kikuchi – synthesizer, organ
- Pete Levin – synthesizer, minimoog, clavinet
- Tim Landers – electric bass
- Billy Cobham – drums
- Alyrio Lima – percussion
