= Trevor Koehler =

American jazz musician

Trevor Koehler (1935-1975) was an American saxophonist. His mother was a First Chair Violinist for the Regina Philharmonic at Regina, Saskatchewan. His biological father was a concert pianist. He began his career as a professional musician as a teenager, playing clubs and nightlife venues in Anchorage AK. He obtained his degree in music from the University of the Pacific. He served in the Band Corp.of the US Army during peacetime between Korea and Vietnam. He recorded with Gil Evans, The Insect Trust, Cornell Dupree, Lou Reed, Octopus. Allan Houser wrote a jazz piece called "Running Wild With Trevor Koehler" that he recorded with his sextet. Father of Glade Koehler and Seth Koehler, and biological father of Louis Durra

After many years of untreated depression complicated by alcoholism, Trevor Koehler committed suicide in 1975.

== Discography ==
- 1968: Insect Trust, The Insect Trust - Drums, Wind, String Arrangements
- 1968: You Used to Think, Erica Pomerance - Sax (Alto)
- 1969: Octopus, Octopus - Saxophone, Sax (Baritone)
- 1970: Hoboken Saturday Night, The Insect Trust - Flute, Drums, Piccolo, Sax (Baritone), Sax (Soprano), Wind
- 1973: Svengali, Gil Evans - Flute, Sax (Baritone), Sax (Soprano), Soloist, Personnel
- 1973: Teasin, Cornell Dupree - Saxophone
- 1974: The Gil Evans Orchestra Plays the Music of Jimi Hendrix, Gil Evans - Flute, Arranger, Saxophone, Sax (Alto), Sax (Baritone), Sax (Tenor)
- 1974: Sally Can't Dance, Lou Reed
