= Lew Soloff =

American jazz trumpeter, composer, and actor (1944–2015)

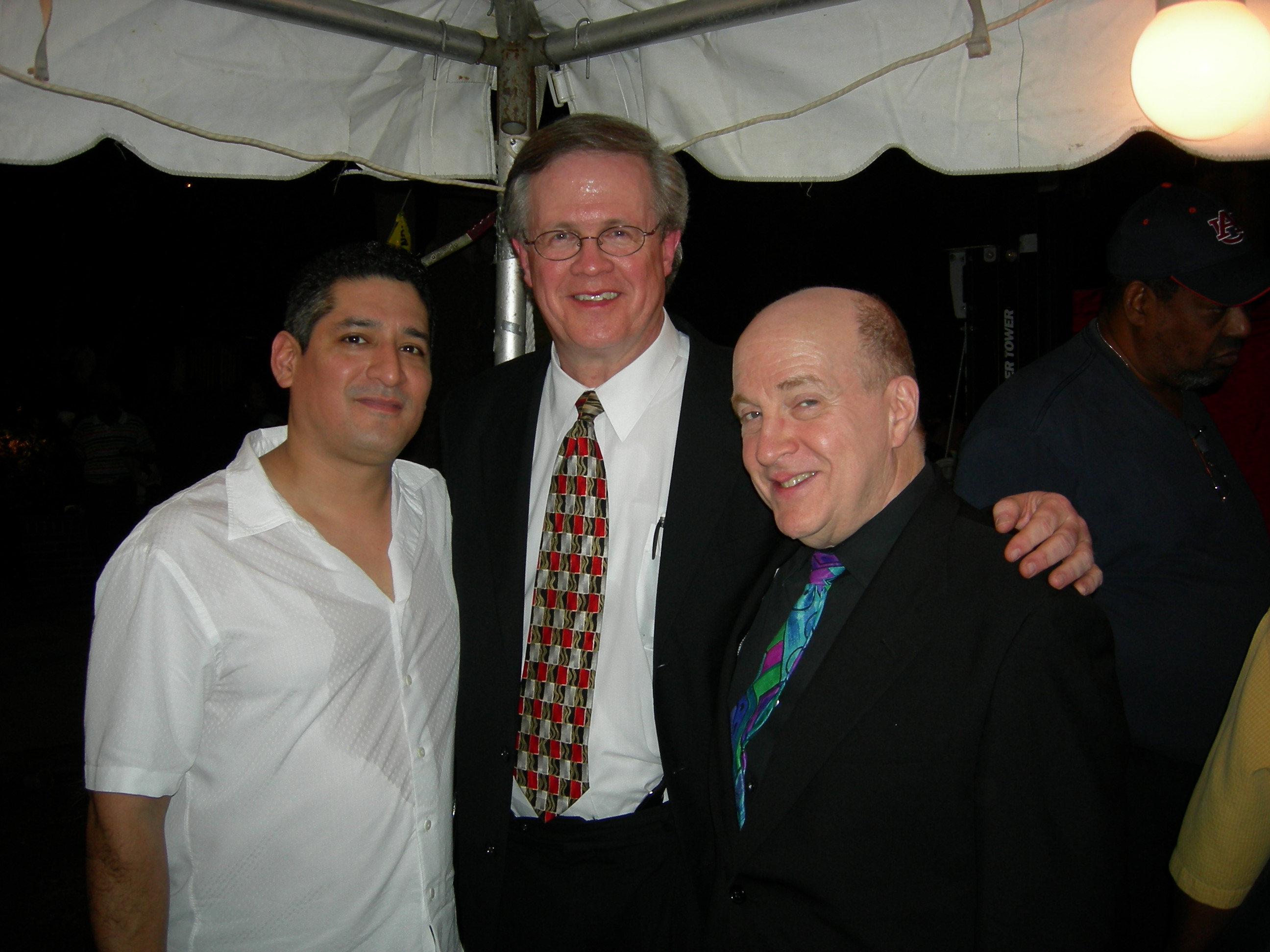
- L to R: Steve Ramos, Ray Reach, and Soloff backstage at the Taste of 4th Avenue Jazz Festival, sponsored by the Alabama Jazz Hall of Fame in Birmingham, Alabama in 2008

Background information
- Born: Lewis Michael Soloff; February 20, 1944; New York City, U.S.
- Died: March 8, 2015 (aged 71) New York City, U.S.
- Instruments: Trumpet, piccolo trumpet
- Years active: 1960–2015
- Label: Columbia Records
- Formerly of: Blood, Sweat & Tears
- Website: www.lewsoloff.com

Lewis Michael Soloff (February 20, 1944 – March 8, 2015) was an American jazz trumpeter, composer, and actor. He was a member of the band Blood, Sweat & Tears.

== Biography ==
From his birth place of New York City, United States, he studied trumpet at the Eastman School of Music and the Juilliard School. He worked with Blood, Sweat & Tears from 1968 until 1973. Prior to this he worked with Machito, Tony Scott, Maynard Ferguson, and Tito Puente.

In the 1980s, he was a member of Members Only, a jazz ensemble who recorded for Muse Records.

Soloff was a regular member and sub-leader of Gil Evans' Monday Night Orchestra beginning in 1983, gaining him experience as a band leader. His debut album recording was supported by Gil. His 2010 recording Sketches of Spain is a tribute to the classic 1959–60 Miles Davis-Gil Evans collaboration, and he has performed the reconstructed Evans arrangements of George Gershwin's Porgy and Bess. Soloff was also a longtime member of the Manhattan Jazz Quintet, Carla Bley Band and Mingus Big Band.

Soloff made frequent guest appearances with jazz orchestras all over the world such as the Lincoln Center Jazz Orchestra (directed by Wynton Marsalis).

He was among a handful of trumpeters capable of playing demanding lead trumpet parts while also contributing improvisational solos and of playing baroque, classical, and later orchestral and chamber music styles, which made him an in-demand session player for commercials and soundtracks.

Soloff died in 2015, at the age of 71, after suffering a heart attack in New York City.

== Discography ==
=== As leader ===
- Air on a G String, 2003 - Larry Willis (piano), Francois Moutin (bass), Victor Lewis (drums)
- Rainbow Mountain, 2000 - Lou Marini (saxophones, flute), Joe Beck (guitar), Mark Egan (bass), Danny Gottlieb (drums). Also with special guests: Delmar Brown (synthesizers, vocal), Hiram Bullock (guitar), Will Lee (bass), Jeff "Tain" Watts (drums), Miles Evans (trumpet), Paul Shaffer (Hammond B-3 organ)
- With a Song In My Heart, 1999 Rob Mounsey (arranger), Victor Lewis (drums), Emily Mitchell Soloff (harp), Mulgrew Miller (piano), George Mraz (bass)
- Little Wing, 1991 - Ray Anderson (trombone), Gil Goldstein (piano, synthesizers, accordion), Pete Levin (organ, synthesizers, vocoder), Mark Egan (bass), Kenwood Dennard (drums), Manolo Badrena (percussion). Produced by Steve Swallow
- My Romance, 1989 - Mark Egan (bass), Janis Siegel (vocal), Danny Gottlieb (drums), Pete Levin (synthesizers), Airto Moreira (percussion), Gil Goldstein (piano, synthesizers), Emily Michell Soloff (harp)
- Speak Low, 1987 - Kenny Kirkland (piano), Richard Davis (bass), Elvin Jones (drums)
- Yesterdays, 1986 -Mike Stern (guitar), Charnett Moffett (bass), Elvin Jones (drums)
- Hanalei Bay, 1985 Gil Evans (electric piano), Pete Levin (synthesizer), Hiram Bullock (guitar), Adam Nussbaum (drums), Mark Egan (bass), Manolo Badrena (percussion)

=== As sideman ===
With Franco Ambrosetti

- Tentets (Enja, 1985)

With Ray Anderson

- Big Band Record (Gramavision, 1994) with the George Gruntz Concert Jazz Band
- Don't Mow Your Lawn (Enja, 1994)

With George Benson

- Tell It Like It Is (A&M/CTI, 1969)
- Big Boss Band (Warner Bros., 1990)

With Carla Bley

- Fleur Carnivore (Watt, 1989)
- The Very Big Carla Bley Band (Watt, 1990)
- Big Band Theory, 1993
- The Carla Bley Big Band Goes to Church (Watt, 1996)
- 4 x 4 (Watt, 1999)
- Looking for America (Watt, 2003)

With Blood, Sweat & Tears

- Blood, Sweat & Tears, 1969 Grammy Award for Album of the Year
- Blood, Sweat & Tears 3, 1970
- Blood, Sweat & Tears 4, 1971
- New Blood, 1972
- No Sweat, 1973

With Hank Crawford

- Night Beat (Milestone, 1989)
- Groove Master (Milestone, 1990)

With Gil Evans

- The Gil Evans Orchestra Plays the Music of Jimi Hendrix (RCA, 1974)
- There Comes a Time (RCA, 1975)
- Parabola (Horo, 1979)
- Gil Evans Live at the Royal Festival Hall London 1978 (RCA, 1979)
- Live at the Public Theater (New York 1980) (Trio, 1981)
- Live at Sweet Basil (Gramavision, 1984 [1986])
- Live at Sweet Basil Vol. 2 (Gramavision, 1984 [1987])
- Bud and Bird (Electric Bird/King, 1986 [1987])
- Farewell (Evidence, 1986 [1992])
- Live At Umbria Jazz Vol. 1 & 2, 2001

With Maynard Ferguson

- Ridin' High (Enterprise, 1967)

With Ricky Ford

- Hot Brass (Candid, 1991)

With Michael Franks

- Tiger in the Rain (Warner Bros., 1979)
- Objects of Desire (Warner Bros., 1982)
- The Camera Never Lies (Warner Bros., 1987)

With Dizzy Gillespie

- Cornucopia (Solid State, 1969)

With Jimmy Heath

- Little Man Big Band (Verve, 1992)

With O'Donel Levy

- Simba (Groove Merchant, 1974)
- Everything I Do Gonna Be Funky (Groove Merchant, 1974)
- Windows (Groove Merchant, 1976)

With Herbie Mann

- Brazil: Once Again (Atlantic, 1977)

With Helen Merrill

- Brownie: Homage to Clifford Brown (Verve, 1994)

With Tisziji Muñoz

- The Paradox of Completion (Anami Music, 2015)

With Bobby Previte

- The 23 Constellations of Joan Miró (Tzadik Records, 2002)

With Dakota Staton

- I Want a Country Man (Groove Merchant, 1973)

With Jeremy Steig

- Firefly (CTI, 1977)

With Sonny Stitt

- Stomp Off Let's Go (Flying Dutchman, 1976)

With Stanley Turrentine

- The Man with the Sad Face (Fantasy, 1976)
- Nightwings (Fantasy, 1977)

With others

- Lincoln Center Jazz Orchestra, A Love Supreme, 2005
- Cold Feet, Cold Feet plays Jazz Feet, 2003
- Bob Belden, Black Dahlia, 2001
- Aretha Franklin, Aretha, 1980
- Manhattan Jazz Quintet, I Got Rhythm, 2001
- Teo Macero, Impressions of Miles Davis, 2001
- Ray Anderson, Don't Mow Your Lawn, 1999
- Trumpet Legacy — Various Artists featuring Lew Soloff, Nicholas Payton, Tom Harrell and Eddie Henderson, 1998
- Giovanni Hidalgo, Time Shifter, 1996
- Rob Mounsey's Flying Monkey Orchestra, Mango Theory, 1995
- Flying Monkey Orchestra, Back In The Pool, 1995
- Various Artists, Jazz At Lincoln Center — They Came to Swing, 1994
- Frankie Valli, Closeup, 1975
- Ray Anderson's Pocket Brass, Where Home Is, 1994
- Giovanni Hidalgo, Worldwide, 1993
- Daniel Schnyder, Mythology, 1992
- Marlena Shaw, Take a Bite, 1979
- Chaka Khan, What Cha' Gonna Do for Me, 1981 (as Lou Soloff)
- Manhattan Jazz Quintet, Manteca, 1992
- Charlie Musselwhite, Signature, 1991
- Teresa Brewer, Memories of Louis, 1991
- Marianne Faithfull, Blazing Away 1990
- Joss Stone, Colour Me Free!, 2009
- Danny Gottlieb, Whirlwind, 1989
- Hilton Ruiz, Strut, 1988
- Hilton Ruiz, Something Grand, 1986
- Tramaine Hawkins, In the Morning Time, 1985
- Frank Sinatra, L.A. Is My Lady, 1984
- Electronic Sonata for Souls Loved by Nature (1980) with George Russell
- Sinéad O'Connor, Am I Not Your Girl?, 1992
- Grant Green, Easy, 1978
- Various Artists, The Atlantic Family Live in Montreaux, 1977
- Barry Miles, Barry Miles, 1970
- Art Garfunkel, Scissors Cut, 1981
- Paul Simon, Graceland, 1986
- Joe Beck, Back to Beck, 1988
- Fred Lipsius, Better Believe It mja Records 1996
- Betty Carter, The Music Never Stops, 2019
