= Mark Egan =

American jazz musician and composer (born 1951)

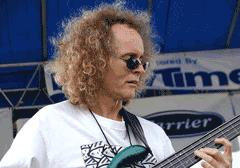

Background information
- Born: Mark McDanel Egan; January 14, 1951 (age 75); Brockton, Massachusetts, U.S.
- Origin: Miami, Florida
- Genres: Jazz fusion, jazz
- Occupations: Musician, composer
- Instrument: Bass
- Years active: 1975–present
- Labels: ECM, Antilles, Novus, Wavetone
- Website: www.markegan.com

Mark Egan (born January 14, 1951, in Brockton, Massachusetts) is an American jazz bassist known for his membership in the Pat Metheny Group and the Gil Evans Orchestra. He is co-founder of the jazz fusion band Elements.

== Biography ==
Mark McDaniel Egan was born in Brockton, Massachusetts in 1951. Influenced by his father, he studied trumpet at age 10. He played the trumpet throughout high school, and began playing the bass when he was 15. While attending the University of Miami's Frost School of Music, initially as a trumpet student, he studied with jazz educator Jerry Coker. He switched from trumpet to bass part way through the program. While in Miami he also became friends and performed with Ira Sullivan, Pat Metheny, Danny Gottlieb, Clifford Carter. His teachers included Jaco Pastorius, Dave Holland, and Andy LaVerne.

In 1974 and 1975, after graduating from the University of Miami School of Music with a degree in Studio Music and Jazz, Egan was a member of the Phyliss Hyman Group, the PH Factor eventually moving to New York City with band members Hiram Bullock (guitar), Clifford Carter (keyboards) and Billy Bowker (drums). Egan went on to tour with Eumir Deodato, The Pointer Sisters and recorded and toured with David Sanborn. In 1977 He was part of the original Pat Metheny Group until 1980. Following his tenure with Pat Metheny he worked as a studio musician in New York City where he recorded and performed with some of the finest musicians in the world including Joe Beck, Steve Khan, Chris Parker, Steve Gadd, Jeff Mironov, Lew Soloff, Lou Marini, John Faddis, Joe Caro, Hugh McCracken, Allan Schwartzberg, John Tropea, Ira Siegal, Richard Crooks, Craig Snyder and many more great musicians.

In 1981 he started the jazz fusion group Elements. co-led with drummer, Danny Gottlieb. They were joined on several Elements releases by Bill Evans - saxophones, Clifford Carter - keyboards, Steve Kahn - guitar, Joe Caro - guitar, Airto Moreira - percussion, Flora Purim -vocals, Jeff Mironov - guitar, Stan Samole - guitar, David Mann - saxophones, and Manolo Badrena - percussion. Elements recorded and toured world wide through the 1990s and recorded nine records released on Antilles, RCA and Wavetone Records.

During the 1980s and 1990s, Egan was also part of the Gil Evans Orchestra. He founded his own record label, Wavetone Records, with twenty six releases to date.

In 1985 he released his first solo recording, Mosaic on the Hip Pocket Label, distributed by Windham Hill Records. His next solo recording, A Touch Of Light, was released in 1988 on the GRP Label. Additional solo projects include, Beyond Words, As We Speak, Truth Be Told, About Now, Direction Home and Cross Currents. Recent collaborations have created Electric Blue, with Drummer Danny Gottlieb, and Dreaming Spirits, with Arjun Brugemann, all released on the Wavetone Records Label.

Egan has made three music videos: Om Yoga & Meditation, Music on the Edge, and Bass Workshop. He has appeared on the soundtracks of movies including The Big Lebowski, Aladdin, Two Moon Junction, The Object of My Affection, You've Got Mail, The Color of Money, Rollover, Quick Change, Blown Away, and A Chorus Line. He recorded the album, Urge, with trumpeter Forrest Buchtel, Jr., featuring, among other things, the theme from CNN Headline News.

Egan has toured and recorded with a vast range of artists including Gil Evans, Pat Metheny, Stan Getz, Sting, Arcadia, Roger Daltrey, Richie Havens, Joan Osborne, Marianne Faithfull, Michael Franks, Steve Grossman, David Liebman, Mitchel Forman, Mike Stern, Terumasa Hino, Laurie Anderson, Carly Simon, Art Garfunkel, John McLaughlin, Larry Coryell, Pat Martino, Judy Collins, Cyndi Lauper, Sophie B. Hawkins, Bill Evans, Lew Soloff, Joe Beck, Jim Hall, Airto Moreira, Flora Purim, Toninho Horta, Linley Hamilton, Paul Shaffer, Gato Barbieri, Chuck Loeb, Hiram Bullock, Clifford Carter, Shawn Colvin, Dar Williams, Gil Goldstein, Eumir Deodato, Marc Cohn, Mark Murphy, George Grunz, Vicki Sue Robinson, Walter Bishop Jr., Sonny Fortune, Frank Wess, Tania Maria, Jackie Mclean, Rory Block, Mimi Farina, Alex Digrassi, Reza Kahn, Jeff Ciampa, Sergio Pereira, Karl Latham, Special EFX, Arjun Bruggemann, Krishna Das and The Pointer Sisters.

== Discography ==
=== As leader ===
- 1985 Mosaic (Hip Pocket)
- 1988 A Touch of Light (GRP)
- 1992 Beyond Words (Mesa/Bluemoon)
- 2001 Freedom Town (Wavetone)
- 2006 As We Speak (Wavetone)
- 2008 Tell Me a Bed Time Story: The Big Apple (Universal Distribution)
- 2010 Truth Be Told (Wavetone)
- 2013 Unit 1 (Wavetone)
- 2014 About Now (Wavetone)
- 2015 Direction Home (Wavetone)
- 2017 "Dreaming Spirits" Mark Egan and Arjun Bruggeman featuring Shane Theriot (Wavetone)
- 2020 "Electric Blue " with Danny Gottlieb (Wavetone)
- 2024 "Cross Currents" with Shawn Pelton and Shane Theriot (Wavetone)

=== With Elements ===
- Elements
- Elements Forward Motion
- Illumination
- Liberal Arts
- Spirit River
- Blown Away
- Far East Volume 1
- Far East Volume 2
- Untold Stories
- Wouldn't It Be Nice: Tribute to Brian Wilson

=== With others ===
1977	David Sanborn Band	David Sanborn	Warner Bros.
1977	Exclusively Yours	Gordon Gordy	RCA
1977	Half and Half	Vicki Sue Robinson	RCA
1977	Hechizo	Frank Quintero	CBS/Sony
1977	Promise Me the Moon	David Sanborn	Warner Bros.
1977	Soul Village	Walter Bishop Jr.	Muse
1977	Tornader	Johnny Winter	Polydor
1978	Cubicle	Walter Bishop Jr.	Muse
1978	Infinity Is	Sonny Fortune	Atlantic
1978	Stolen Moments	Mark Murphy	32 Jazz
1978	Pat Metheny Group	Pat Metheny Group	ECM
1979	Monuments	Jackie McLean	RCA
1979	Perspective	Steve Grossman	Atlantic
1979	With Sound Reason	Sonny Fortune	Atlantic
1979	American Garage	Pat Metheny Group	ECM
1980	Cosmic City	David Matthews	King
1980	Horn of a Different Color	Jerry Peel	Bull
1980	Satisfaction Guaranteed	Mark Murphy	Muse
1980	Tanger	Dwight Druick	Rio
1981	Beauty's Song	Stan Samole	Lotus
1981	Billy Highstreet Samba	Stan Getz	Phonogram
1981	Concerto de Aranjuez	Jim Hall	King
1981	Music of Chick Corea	Andy Laverne	Jazzline
1981	Ross Traut	Ross Traut	Headfirst
1981	Wrapped in a Cloud	Gil Goldstein	Muse
1982	The Artistry of Mark Murphy	Mark Murphy	Muse
1982	Dune	David Matthews	CTI
1982	Manhattan Carnival	Dave Tofani	Solo Winds
1982	Objects of Desire	Michael Franks	Warner Bros.
1983	Grand Connection	Dave Matthews Orch.	GNP Crescendo
1983	Star Climber	Mitch Farber	Muse
1984	Islands	Scott Cossu	Windham Hill
1984	Living in the Crest of a Wave	Bill Evans	Elektra
1984	Theatre	George Gruntz	ECM
1985	A Chorus Line	Movie Soundtrack	Polygram
1985	Amanda	Randy Brecker & Eliane Elias	Passport Jazz
1985	Hanalei Bay	Lew Soloff	King
1985	Push	Bill Evans	Escapade
1985	Skin Dive	Michael Franks	Warner Bros.
1985	So Red the Rose	Arcadia	Capitol
1985	Speed Demon	Dave Mathews	King
1986	Aquamarine	Danny Gottlieb	Atlantic
1986	They Cannot Know	Dino Betti Van Der Noot	Soul Note
1986	Farewell	Gil Evans	King
1986	Live at Sweet Basil	Gil Evans	King
1986	Modern Manners	Special EFX	GRP
1986	Slice of Life	Special EFX	GRP
1986	Solo	Mimi Farina	Rounder
1986	The Alternative Man	Bill Evans	Blue Note
1986	The Color of Money	Soundtrack	MCA
1986	Trade Wind	Terumasa Hino	CBS/Sony
1986	Upside Downside	Mike Stern	Atlantic
1987	Altiplano	Alex de Grassi	Novus
1987	Bud and Bird	Gil Evans	King
1987	Farewell	Gil Evans	Evidence
1987	Gift of Vision	Mark Knoble	Highland
1987	Homage to John Coltrane	Dave Liebman	Owl
1987	Nothing Like the Sun	Sting	A&M
1987	Nougayork	Claude Nougaro	Warner
1987	The Camera Never Lies	Michael Franks	Warner
1987	They Cannot Know	Van Der Noot	Soul Note
1987	Three Way Mirror	Airto Moreira	
1988	A Chance for a Dance	Dino Betti Van Der Noot	Nowo Spa
1988	Back to Beck	Joe Beck	DMP
1988	Body	Toshio Kamei	CBS/Sony
1988	Double Feature	Special EFX	GRP
1988	Forbidden Colors	Tania Maria	Capitol
1988	Music of Chick Corea	Andy LaVerne	Delta
1988	My Romance	Lew Soloff	King
1988	Punch Line	Soundtrack	A&M
1988	Sampler '88	Various	Novus/BMG
1988	The Green Chinese Table	Seigen Ono	Virgin
1988	Whirlwind	Danny Gottlieb	Atlantic
1989	Away from Home	David Broza	EMI
1989	Glamour Camp	Glamour Camp	EMI
1989	Moonstone	Toninho Horta	Verve Forecast
1989	Songs from the Lost World	Jonathan Elias	Enigma
1989	Strange Angels	Laurie Anderson	Warner
1989	Strange Days	David Van Tieghem	Private Music
1989	Struck By Lightning	Airto Moreira	Venture
1989	Tears of Joy	Tuck and Patti	Windham Hill
1989	There Were Signs	Bill Gable	Private Music
1989	Tribute to Gil	Gil Evans	Soul Note
1989	Turning Point	Rory Block	Munich Records
1990	Dade in the Shade	The Dade	BigWorld
1990	Friends	Joe Beck	DMP
1990	Party in the Basement	Pete Levin	Gramavision
1990	Starclimber	Mitch Farber	Muse
1990	The Unspoken Heart	Rodney Jones	Minor Music
1990	Where You Lay Your Head	Bill Cosby	Polygram
1991	Afoxe	Ernie Watts	CTI
1991	Aidalai	Mecano	BMG/Sentia
1991	Cool Running	Jeremy Wall	Buffalo Records
1991	Home Again	David Wilcox	A&M
1991	Little Wing	Lew Soloff	Sweet Basil
1991	Marc Cohn	Marc Cohn	Atlantic
1991	Standards of Living	Tom Bones Malone	BigWorld
1991	Storyteller	Philippe Saisse	Polygram
1992	Gliding	Stan Samole	Jazz Inspirations
1992	Last Session	Sting & Gil Evans	
1992	Music on the Edge	Various	CTI
1992	NY First Calls	David Matthews	Funhouse
1992	Rocks in the Head	Roger Daltrey	Atlantic
1992	Stained Glass Memories	Scott Cossu	Windam Hill
1992	Tongues and Tails	Sophie B. Hawkins	Columbia
1992	Walkin' into the Sun	Clifford Carter	Soul Coast
1992	Youkali	Jim Hall	CTI
1993	Collection	Special EFX	GRP
1993	Driving into the Sea	Babel Hounds	Big Cow Records
1993	Free Falling	Red Grammer	Red Note
1993	Happier Blue	Chris Smither	Flying Fish
1993	Killer Bees	Airto Moreira	B&W Music
1993	Laughed Last	Lili Anel	Palmetto
1993	Little Victories	Darden Smith	Sony
1993	Rainbows Revenge	Glenn Alexander	Shanachie
1993	The Sands of Time	Gil Goldstein	Muse
1994	A Dip in the Pool	A Dip in the Pool	Epic
1994	Barney's Favorites Vol. 2	Roberta Flack	Capitol
1994	Bassic Instinct 3	Mark Egan W/Various Artists	Notes on Call
1994	Gao, Volume I	Gao	Vap
1994	Saxual	Dan Moretti	Par
1994	Simple Thing	Issei Ishida	East-West/Warner
1994	The Power Of Cool	Donald Harrison	CTI
1994	Tropical Escape	Craig Peyton	Earth Flight
1994	Wonder Child	Gao	Vap
1994	World Tour	Jason Miles	Lipstick
1994	Foot On The Road	Toninho Horta	Verve Forecast
1995	A Little Trip to the Stone Circle	Issei Ishida Moon	
1995	A Secret Life	Marianne Faithful	Island
1995	Abandoned Garden	Michael Franks	Warner
1995	Big Trip	Chris Hunter	Sweet Basil
1995	Calling You	William Galison	Verve Forecast
1995	Fingerpainting	Joe Beck	Wavetone
1995	Honey Man	Gil Evans	Newtone
1995	Miss You in New York	T-Square	Sony
1995	Pearls	David Sanborn	Elektra
1996	Hombre de Blues	Jaf	RCA/BMG
1996	I'll Be Your Baby Tonight	Bernadette Peters	Angel
1996	Mango Theory	Flying Monkey Orch.	Monkeyville
1996	Mortal City	Dar Williams	Razor and Tie
1996	Push	Johnathan Pagano	
1996	Regarding the Soul	Dee Carstensen	Exit Nine
1996	Relish	Joan Osborne	Blue Gorilla
1996	Signs of Life	Jeff Ciampa	Wavetone
1996	Speed Demon	David Matthews	King
1996	Tornado	Rory Block	Uni/Rounder
1997	Dig	Dig This	Wingnut Music
1997	End of the Summer	Dar Williams	Razor and Tie
1997	From a Parent To a Child	Art Garfunkel	Columbia
1997	From here to Nichternity	David Nichtern	Nudgie
1997	Loaded Leather Moonroof	Don Ross	Columbia
1997	Open Door	Michael Whalen	Helicon
1997	Reluctant Pilgrim	Stephan Schwartz	LML Music
1997	Starfish In The Moon	Bill Evans	Escapade
1997	VA-Street News	Bob Magnusson	Cap
1997	Who's afraid of Mark Egan with the big bad Bass	Various Artists	Hot Wire
1997	You Don't Know Me	Billy James	Uptown Sound
1997	Zone Unknown	Gabriel Roth and Mirrors	Raven
1998	Between Us	Jules Shear	High Street
1998	Fearless Dreamer	Pam Fleming	Infinite Room Records
1998	Holiday Songs and Lullabies	Shawn Colvin	Columbia
1998	Largo	Largo	Blue Gorilla
1998	The Wave is Coming	Armsted Christian	Siam
1998	Where are You Now	Deanna Kirk	Blackbird
1998	Who Loves You (Tribute to Jaco Pastorius)	Various Artists	Victor
1999	Bleeker Street	Various Artists	Astor Place
1999	Butter, Live at Mojo's	Dave Mullen	Dave Mullen
1999	Che Corazon	Gato Barbieri	Columbia
1999	In The Bush	Electric Breakwater	J-Bird
1999	I Remember You	Yujiro Wada	King
1999	Modern Man John	Sheehan	Sheehan CDS
1999	My Window	Ed Littman	Yeah Man
1999	Of Near and Distant Lands	Billy Eric	Mirror Wizard
1999	Pictures at the Family House	Tom Mcgrath	Tom Mcgrath
1999	Rainbow Mountain	Lew Soloff	Enja
1999	Slvia Hotel	Cheryl Wheeler	Philo
1999	Songbook	Mark Murphy	32 Jazz
1999	Touch	Bill Evans	ESC
1999	House of Mirrors	Jeff Ciampa	
2000	Allow Me	Jules Shear	Unizoe Records
2000	Eye Contact	Jay Beckenstein	Windham Hill
2000	From Belo to Seoul	Jack Lee	Truespace Records
2000	Kiroron	Don Sebesky	Aosis Records
2000	Listen	Chuck Loeb	Shanachie
2000	Santa Rita	Richard Niles	Black Box Jazz
2000	Small Voices Calling	Martha Wash	Vital Records
2000	Solo Flights	Lynn Seaton	Omnitone
2000	Universal Language	Marc Antoine	Verve
2000	Vibes Revisited	Kurt Weil	TCB Records
2000	Without a Doubt	Frank Wess/Frank Vignola	Koch International
2000	You've Got Mail (soundtrack)	Various	Warner Bros.
2001	75th Birthday Concert	Gil Evans	BBC Legends
2001	A Love Affair	The Music of Ivan Lins	Telarc
2001	Above Horizons	Masahiro Sayama	JVC
2001	An American Garden	Dave Tofani	Solo Winds
2001	Global Exchange	George Gruntz	TCB
2001	In A Heartbeat	Chuck Loeb	Shanachie
2001	Live at Umbria Jazz, Vol. 1	Gil Evans Orchestra	Egea
2001	Live at Wolftrap	Judy Collins	Wildflower
2001	Peace of Mind	Carmen Questa	Skip
2001	Saundra Santiago	Saundra Santiago	SSRS
2001	This Day and Age	Clayton Bruce Ost	Tribeca
2002	Bardo	Gabrielle Roth	Raven
2002	Being in Dreaming	Michael Hewett-	Dharma Moon
2002	Brazilian Nights	Romero Lubambo	Q Records
2002	I'm Every Woman	Rory Block	Rounder
2002	In the Bush	Electric Breakwater	J-Bird Records
2002	Insect Warriors	Mark Stanley	Sir EEL Records
2002	Live at Umbria Jazz Vol.2	Gil Evans Orchestra	Egea
2002	Sentimental Spirit	Kwang Min Kim	Nanjang
2002	When We were Kings	Eugene Ruffolo	Continental Song City
2003	10 cc of Tears	April	Victor Entertainment
2003	Beat Avenues	Eric Andersen	Appleseed Recordings
2003	Chacon	Thom Chacon	Pie Records
2003	Folk Prayer	Jon Werking	Cedar-King Music
2003	Gil Evans 75th Birthday Concert	Gil Evans	BBC
2003	Just Friends	The Joe Beck Trio	Whailing City Sound
2003	Om Yoga Mix	David Nicturne	Dharma Moon
2003	Once in a Lifetime	Rene'e Snyder	NSW 1159
2003	The Other Side of Time	Mary Fahl	Sony
2003	The Shadow of the Cat	Gato Barbieri	Peak
2003	Tricycles	Larry Coryell Trio	Inn and Out Records
2003	Yes Indeed	Billy Eric	Mirror Wizard Music
2004	All in Good Time	Don Ross	Boulder Hill
2004	Long Road to Nowhere	David Amram, Frank Messina	Spokeface Records
2004	Midnight Flower	Drala	Dharma Moon
2004	New York Confidential	Forest Buchtel, Gary Anderson	Monk Music
2004	Thelonius Bach's Lunch	Jeff Laibson, Mark Egan, Danny Gottlieb	Wavetone
2005	Flora's Song	Flora Purim	Narada
2005	Miles Away	Sam Morrison	Brown Bag
2005	OM Yoga and Meditation	Cyndi Lee & David Nictern	Dharma Moon
2005	Soul Grass	Bill Evans	BHM
2005	The Body Electric	Cyndi Lauper	Sony
2005	Tomorrow's Too Late	B.D. Lenz	Apria
2006	High Grade Fusion	Eriko Akiya	Shinko Music
2006	Mahoney's Way	Dave Mullens	Roberts Music Group
2006	Peace of Mind	Andy Laverne	Clavebop
2006	Phoenix	Edo Castro	Passion Star
2006	Strange Fruit	Sting	ITM
2006	The Word is Out	Jaco Pastorius Big Band	Heads Up
2007	Live in the Moment	Ken Serio	Tripping Tree
2007	Jazz Impressions 1	Silvano Monasterios/Mark Egan/Paul Wertico	Dogleg Music
2008	Little Wild One	Joan Osborne	Saguaro Road Records
2013	Dusting The Time	Gianfranco Continenza	Videoradio
2015	Constellations The Music of Bjork	Karl Latham/Ryan Carniaux/Mark Egan/Nick Rolfe	Double Moon Records
2015	"In The Bush"	Electric Breakwater	WM - reissue
2016	"Living Standards"	Karl Latham-Mark Egan-Vic Juris	Drope Zone Jazz Records
2016	"The Cayote"	Vinnie Zummo	Vaz Music
2017	Be Cool	Dave Snider	Dave Snider Music
2017	Trust In The heart	Krishna Das	Krishna Das Music
2018	Peace of my Heart	Krishna Das	Krishna Das Music
2019	"The Future Ain’t What It Used To Be"	The 14-Arranged by Dan Bonsanti	
2020	For the Record	Linley Hamilton	Teddy D Records
2021	Cartoon Bebop	The 14- Jazz Orchestra Arranged by Dan Bonsanti	Dabon Music LLC
2021	The Gil Evans Orchestra Live at Fabrik	Gil Evans Orchestra	Jazzline Classics
2021	Jane Getter Premonition Anomalia	Jane Getter	Cherry Red Records
2021	Bodiheart "Love Rules"	Noah Hoffeld and Wells Henly	Blue Yarn Records
2022	Finesse	Sergio Pereira	Seda Jazz Records
2023	Ginger's Hollow	Linley Hamilton	Whirlwind Recordings
2023	Niles Smiles	Richard Niles	Niles Smiles Music
2023	Brazilian Match	Luiz Milan	Jazz Station Records
2024	Mystical	Reza Khan	Reza Khan Music
