= Belleayre Music Festival =

The Belleayre Music Festival is an annual festival in the Catskill Mountains of Upstate New York. Founded in Highmount, NY, Phyllis and Mel Litoff, raised the prominence of the festival after becoming co-artistic directors in 1993. Since then, the festival has hosted such artists as James Blunt, Rosanne Cash, Branford Marsalis, Frankie Valli, Obie Benson, Lyle Lovett, The Neville Brothers, Linda Eder, Ray Charles, and Wynton Marsalis.
