= Shunzo Ohno =

Japanese trumpeter, composer, and arranger (born 1949)

Shunzo Ohno (大野 俊三, Ōno Shunzō; born 22 March 1949) is a Japanese trumpeter, composer and arranger.

In 1974 Ohno accepted Art Blakey's offer and went to the U.S. He made recordings in cooperation with famous musicians, and some of his songs sold very well. He played active parts as a member of MACHITÖ Y SUS AFROCUBANAS and became known in Europe and South America. In 1984, he won a Grammy Award for his album Machito and His Salsa Big Band. Four years later, he also won for Live at Sweet Basil. Ohno was a passenger in an automobile accident in 1988 severing his lip, concussion, and broke teeth. He had to take months to re establish his embouchure to play trumpet 3 months later he played on the Buster Williams 'Something More" album with Herbie Hancock, Wayne Shorter, and Al Foster. In 2014, he won the Grand Prize in the International Songwriting Competition. The first Jazz artist to win the Grand Prize and became the first Japanese composer/musician to win the Grand Prize The song is one of his most well known compositions, "Musashi".

== Biography ==
Ohno Shunzo was born in Gifu Prefecture in 1949.

He started enjoying music when he was 13. When he was 17, he was absorbed in the jazz music, playing in Clubs and Nightclubs featuring big bands By the time he was 19, he was recognied as one of the top jazz trumpeter in Japan. In 1973, drum master and Band Leader, Art Blakey invited Shunzo to join him while in Japan and then in New York City. Upon arriving in NYC, 1974 he began to tour with Art Blakey and The Jazz Messengers, and played with Roy Haynes, Norman Connors,"You are my Starship" with Phyliis Hyman. Soon after he toured with Wayne Shorter, Larry Coryell, Buster Williams, Gil Evans, Machito, Hector LaVoe and special performances with Herbie Hancock. (shunzoohno.com, Shunzo Ohno Official Site) Also, as a member of Machito and his AfroCuban Orchestra, he participated in all American tours or South American tours.

The album Machito and His Salsa Big Band, which included many of his dazzling solos, received a Grammy.

From 1983, he participated in Gil Evans Orchestra and in 1988, he got another Grammy award for the album Live at Sweet Basil.

On the Christmas Eve in 1988, he got seriously injured in the automiblie accident. This resulted in a concussion, severed lip cuts and chipped teeth. Devastating for a trumpeter to form an embouchure to play the trumpet. However, he did not give up playing, endured his rigorous rehabilitation, and created his own unique embouchure to start his professional activity. In March 1989 the masterful Buster Williams album was recorded at the Rudy van Gelder's Recording Studio in New Jersey. The legendary Rudy van Gelder digitally recorded, mixed and mastered ''Something More''.Featuring: Buster Williams: Bass, Herbie Hancock: Piano/Keyboards, Wayne Shorter: Tenor & Soprano Sax, Shunzo Ohno: Trumpet, Al Foster: Drums. https://www.youtube.com/watch?v=v4hZTg-iqAQ

In 1996, a tragedy happened to him again. 4th stage aggressive cancer was found in his tonsils. He could not avoid a major operation removing over 125 muscles and tendons in his neck, followed by 38+ intensive rounds of radiation. All his doctor specialist advised him to give up playing trumpet as it would be physically impossible to produce a sound. Three months after, Wayne Shorter, who Ohno Shunzo respected, requested him to join him in California performances. His support as a mentor, as a friend helped Ohno to remain undefeated. "I am forever indebted to Wayne Shorter's encouragement and belief in me." He said "Indeed I lost some time because of two accidents and many other challenges, but I have learned a lot about how to play the trumpet or to express my own feeling."

In 1999, Ohno participated in Larry Coryell's world tour.

After the major earthquake in the Tohoku District on March 11, 2011, Ohno played many charity performances in many places both in Japan and in foreign countries to support the victims. He has visited Northern Japan, the families and communities struck by the tsunami, earthquake and nueclear disaster every year ( except 2021 due to a no fly time covid crisis) through 2025 as of the time of this writing. the future leaders of the world will emerge from the places that have experienced disasters. They have lived, survive, and understand what it means. and therefore can create the best resolutions for our shared humanity."

In 2014, Ohno got the Grand Prize (International Songwriters Competition) for his song "Musashi" in the International Songwriting Competition, which is famous as one of the best composition competition in the world. Out of 20,000 submissions Shunzo Ohno composition, Musashi was the Grand Prize winner. The first Jazz album to win this award and the ffirst Japanese composer to win this honor.

== Awards ==
- 1984 Grammy Award for Machito and His Salsa Big Band.
- 1988 Grammy Award for Live at Sweet Basil.
- 2001 Music section of Asian-American Jazz Connection from U.J.C. (Universal Jazz Coalition & New York Jazz Center) prize.
- 2005 Gifu furusato bunka prize (Gifu back home culture prize).
- 2014 Grand Prize at the International Songwriting Competition (ISC). He was the first Japanese man to get the prize, and the first in the field of jazz.

== Compositions ==
Among his best-known compositions are:

- Bubbles
- Something Coming
- Machito and His Salsa Big Band
- Live at sweet Basil
- Sakura(Cherry Blossoms)
- Home
- Tsuki no Hikari (The Moonlight)
- Musashi
- DREAMER
- Okinawa
- FireFly
- Lea's Run
