= Charlie Parker discography =

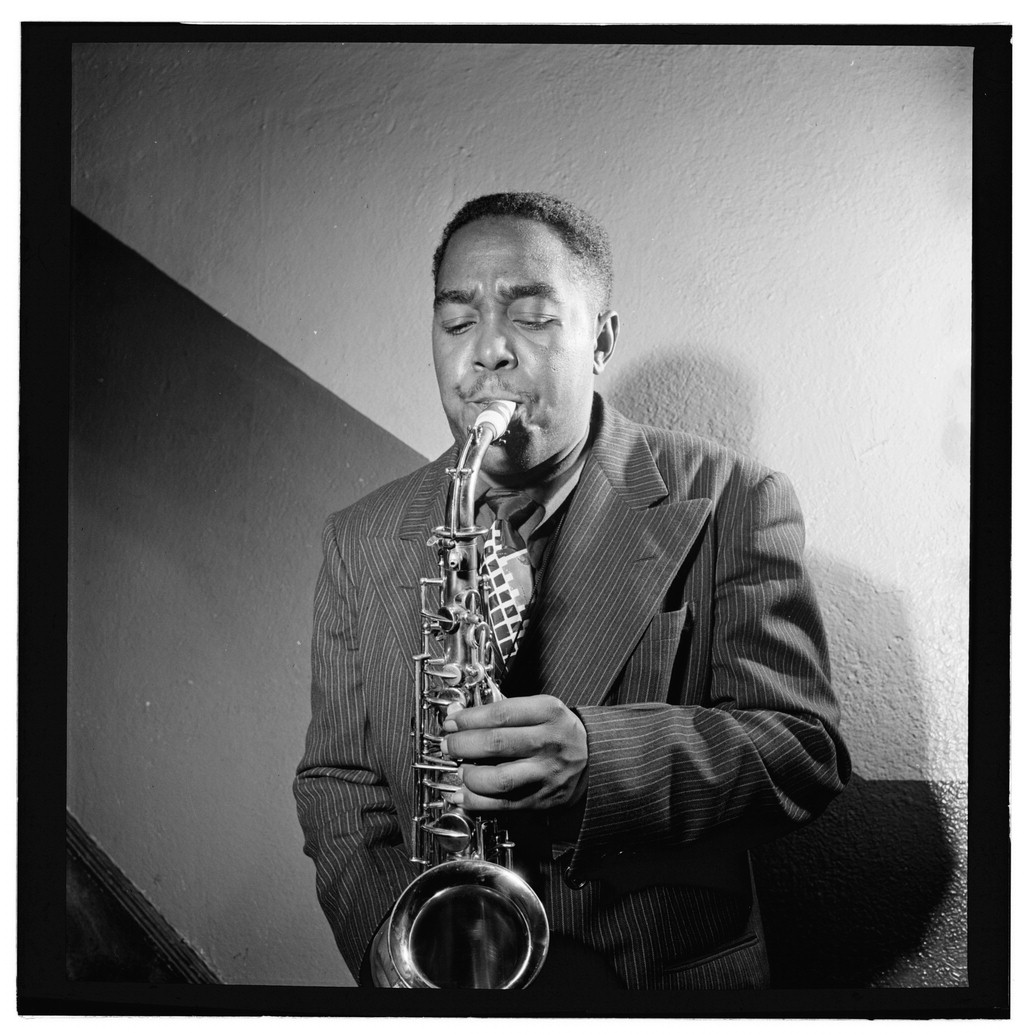
- Charlie Parker at Carnegie Hall, New York City in 1947

This is a list of recordings by American jazz alto saxophonist Charlie Parker ("Bird"). Parker primarily recorded for three labels: Savoy, Dial, and Verve. His work with these labels has been chronicled in box sets. Charlie Parker's Savoy and Dial Sessions have been issued on The Complete Savoy Sessions, Charlie Parker on Dial and Complete Charlie Parker on Dial and The Complete Savoy & Dial Master Takes. His Verve recordings are available on Bird: The Complete Charlie Parker on Verve and The Complete Verve Master Takes.

== Discography ==
=== Studio albums ===
Year	Title	Label	Notes
10" LPs
1950	Charlie Parker Sextet	Dial	
1950	Charlie Parker with Strings	Mercury	MG C-501
1950	New Sounds in Modern Music, Volume 1	Savoy	MG 9000; AKA Charlie Parker, Vol. 1; compilation?
1951	Charlie Parker with Strings #2	Mercury	MG C-509
1951	New Sounds in Modern Music, Volume 2	Savoy	MG 9001; AKA Charlie Parker, Vol. 2; compilation?
1952	Bird and Diz	Mercury	MG C-512
1952	South of the Border	Mercury	MG C-513
1952	New Sounds in Modern Music, Volume 3	Savoy	MG 9010; AKA Charlie Parker, Vol. 3; compilation?
1953	New Sounds in Modern Music, Volume 4	Savoy	MG 9011; AKA Charlie Parker, Vol. 4; compilation?
1954	Charlie Parker	Clef	MG C-157; later released as Now's The Time with alternative takes
12" LPs
1953	Big Band	Clef	MG C-609
Posthumous albums
1961	The Happy "Bird"	Charlie Parker	PLP 404

=== Live albums ===
Year	Title	Label	Notes
1957	Bird at St. Nick's	Jazz Workshop	
1957	Bird on 52nd St.	Jazz Workshop	
1961	An Evening at Home with the Bird	Savoy	
1972	Charlie Parker	Prestige	2xLP; compiles Bird at St. Nick's and Bird on 52nd St.
1972	The Comprehensive Charlie Parker: Live Performances, Volume I	ESP-Disk	ESP-BIRD-1
1973	Broadcast Performances: 1948–1949, Vol. 2 of 14 Volumes	ESP-Disk	ESP-BIRD-2
1974	The Parker Jam Session	Verve	2xLP; compiles Norman Granz' Jam Session, #1 and Norman Granz' Jam Session, #2
1975	New Bird: Hi Hat Broadcasts 1953	Phoenix Jazz	Phoenix 10
1975	New Bird: Volume 2	Phoenix Jazz	Phoenix 12
1977	One Night in Birdland	Columbia	2xLP
1977	Summit Meeting at Birdland	Columbia	
1977	Bird with Strings: Live at the Apollo, Carnegie Hall & Birdland	Columbia	
1977	Bird and Pres: The '46 Concerts	Verve	2xLP; with Lester Young
1977	Bird at the Roost	Savoy	
1978	Inglewood Jam: Live at the Trade Winds 16 June 1952	Jazz Chronicles	JCS 102; with Chet Baker
1980	One Night in Chicago	Savoy	SJL 1132
1981	Live Sessions	Phoenix 10	
1982	One Night in Washington	Elektra Musician	as Charlie Parker with the Orchestra
1983	Live at Rockland Palace	Charlie Parker	CP 502
1983	Parker Plus Strings	Charlie Parker	CP 513
1985	Charlie Parker at Storyville	Blue Note	
1985	Bird at the Roost – The Savoy Years: The Complete Royal Roost Performances, Volume One	Savoy Jazz	2xLP
1986	Bird at the Roost – The Savoy Years: The Complete Royal Roost Performances, Volume Two	Savoy Jazz	2xLP
1986	Bird at the Roost – The Savoy Years: The Complete Royal Roost Performances, Volume Three	Savoy Jazz	
1993	Bird at the High-Hat	Blue Note	compiles Phoenix Jazz LP 10 and LP 12.
1993	Montréal, 1953	Uptown	
1997	Diz 'n Bird at Carnegie Hall	Roost	with Dizzy Gillespie
2005	Town Hall, New York City, June 22, 1945	Uptown	with Dizzy Gillespie
Bootlegs
1990	Bird's Eyes: Last Unissued, Vol. 1	Philology (Italy)	
1990	Bird's Eyes: Last Unissued, Vol. 2	Philology (Italy)	
1990	Bird's Eyes: Last Unissued, Vol. 3	Philology (Italy)	
1990	Bird's Eyes: Last Unissued, Vol. 4	Philology (Italy)	
1990	Bird's Eyes: Last Unissued, Vol. 5	Philology (Italy)	
1990	Bird's Eyes: Last Unissued, Vol. 6	Philology (Italy)	
1993	Bird's Eyes: Last Unissued, Vol. 7	Philology (Italy)	
1994	Bird's Eyes: Last Unissued, Vol. 8	Philology (Italy)	
1998	Bird's Eyes: Last Unissued, Vol. 9	Philology (Italy)	
?	Bird's Eyes: Last Unissued, Vol. 10	Philology (Italy)	
?	Bird's Eyes: Last Unissued, Vol. 11	Philology (Italy)	
?	Bird's Eyes: Last Unissued, Vol. 12	Philology (Italy)	
?	Bird's Eyes: Last Unissued, Vol. 13	Philology (Italy)	
?	Bird's Eyes: Last Unissued, Vol. 14	Philology (Italy)	
?	Bird's Eyes: Last Unissued, Vol. 15	Philology (Italy)	
?	Bird's Eyes: Last Unissued, Vol. 16	Philology (Italy)	
?	Bird's Eyes: Last Unissued, Vol. 17	Philology (Italy)	
?	Bird's Eyes: Last Unissued, Vol. 18	Philology (Italy)	
?	Bird's Eyes: Last Unissued, Vol. 19	Philology (Italy)	
?	Bird's Eyes: Last Unissued, Vol. 20	Philology (Italy)	
?	Bird's Eyes: Last Unissued, Vol. 21	Philology (Italy)	
?	Bird's Eyes: Last Unissued, Vol. 22	Philology (Italy)	
?	Bird's Eyes: Last Unissued, Vol. 23	Philology (Italy)	
?	Bird's Eyes: Last Unissued, Vol. 24	Philology (Italy)	
?	Bird's Eyes: Last Unissued, Vol. 25	Philology (Italy)	

=== Compilations ===
Year	Title	Label	Notes
1949	The Bird Blows the Blues	Dial	901
1951	Alternate Masters, Vol. 1	Dial	904
1954	Alternate Masters, Vol. 2	Dial	905
1955	The Magnificent Charlie Parker	Clef	MG C-646; compiles The Magnificent Charlie Parker (Album #1) (7") and The Magnificent Charlie Parker (Album #2) (7")
1955	Charlie Parker with Strings	Clef	MG C-675; compiles Charlie Parker with Strings (10") and Charlie Parker with Strings #2 (10")
1955	Charlie Parker Memorial, Vol. 1	Savoy	MG-12000
1955	The Immortal Charlie Parker	Savoy	MG-12001
1955	Charlie Parker Memorial, Vol. 2	Savoy	MG-12009
1956	The Genius of Charlie Parker	Savoy	MG-12014
1956	The Charlie Parker Story	Savoy	MG-12079
1957	The Charlie Parker Story #1	Verve	MG V-8000
1957	The Charlie Parker Story #2	Verve	MG V-8001
1957	The Charlie Parker Story #3	Verve	MG V-8002
1957	Night and Day: The Genius of Charlie Parker #1	Verve	MG V-8003
1957	April in Paris: The Genius of Charlie Parker #2	Verve	MG V-8004
1957	Now's the Time: The Genius of Charlie Parker #3	Verve	MG V-8005
1957	Bird and Diz: The Genius of Charlie Parker #4	Verve	MG V-8006
1957	Charlie Parker Plays Cole Porter: The Genius of Charlie Parker #5	Verve	MG V-8007
1957	Fiesta: The Genius of Charlie Parker #6	Verve	MG V-8008
1957	Jazz Perennial: The Genius of Charlie Parker #7	Verve	MG V-8009
1957	Swedish Schnapps: The Genius of Charlie Parker #8	Verve	MG V-8010
1962	The 'Bird' Returns	Savoy	MG-12179
1966	Newly Discovered Sides by the Immortal Charlie Parker	Savoy	MG-12186
1970	Charlie Parker on Dial, Volume 1	Spotlite	Spotlite 101
1970?	Charlie Parker on Dial, Volume 2	Spotlite	Spotlite 102
1970?	Charlie Parker on Dial, Volume 3	Spotlite	Spotlite 103
1970	Charlie Parker on Dial, Volume 4	Spotlite	Spotlite 104
1970	Charlie Parker on Dial, Volume 5	Spotlite	Spotlite 105
1970?	Charlie Parker on Dial, Volume 6	Spotlite	Spotlite 106
1970	Lullaby in Rhythm	Spotlite	Spotlite 107
1976	Yardbird in Lotus Land	Spotlite	SPJ123; (partially?) live; reissued by Phoenix in 1977
1976	Bird/The Savoy Recordings (Master Takes)	Savoy Jazz	SJL-2201; 2xLP
1977	Encores	Savoy Jazz	SJL-1107
1977	Bird in Sweden	Spotlite	SPJ124/125; 2xLP; as Charlie Parker and His Swedish All Stars
1979	Bird/Encores Vol.2	Savoy	SJL 1129
1981	Every Bit of It	Spotlite	SPJ150D; 2xLP; December 1945
1981	Bird & Miles	Phoenix 10	with Miles Davis
1984	The Complete Savoy Sessions Volume 1 (1944–1945)	Savoy Jazz (West Germany)	
1984?	The Complete Savoy Sessions Volume 2 (1945)	Savoy Jazz (West Germany)	
1984	The Complete Savoy Sessions Volume 3 (1947)	Savoy Jazz (West Germany)	
1984?	The Complete Savoy Sessions Volume 4 (1947–1948)	Savoy Jazz (West Germany)	
1984?	The Complete Savoy Sessions Volume 5 (1948)	Savoy Jazz (West Germany)	
1986	Birth of the Bebop: Bird on Tenor 1943	Stash	ST-260
1988	The Bird You Never Heard	Stash	ST-280/ST-CD-10; live
1989	Rara Avis Avis (Rare Bird)	Stash	ST-CD-21
1989	The Legendary Dial Masters, Volume 1	Stash	ST-CD-23
1989	The Legendary Dial Masters, Volume 2	Stash	ST-CD-25
1991	The Complete Birth of the Bebop	Stash	ST-CD-535; expanded reissue of Birth of the Bebop
1995	Young Bird, Volumes 1 & 2: 1940–1944	Média 7 (France)	MJCD 78/79; 2xCD
1996	Young Bird, Volume 3: 1945	Média 7 (France)	MJCD 104
1996	Young Bird, Volume 4: 1945	Média 7 (France)	MJCD 113
1997	Young Bird, Volume 5: 1945–1946	Média 7 (France)	MJCD 121

=== Box sets ===
Year	Title	Label	Notes
1973	Charlie Parker on Dial	Odeon (Japan)	7xLP; compiles Spotlite 101–107
1978	The Complete Savoy Studio Sessions	Savoy	5xLP; reissued 3xCD in 1986 (Japan), 1988 (Savoy Jazz)
1990	The Complete Dean Benedetti Recordings	Mosaic	7xCD; live
1990	Bird: The Complete Charlie Parker on Verve	Verve	10xCD
1993	Charlie Parker on Dial	Spotlite/Stash	4xCD, 8xLP; reissue of Odeon, 1973
1995	Complete Charlie Parker on Dial	Jazz Classics	4xCD; reissue of Spotlite, 1993
1998	The Complete Live Performances on Savoy	Savoy Jazz	4xCD; live
2000	The Complete Savoy and Dial Studio Recordings 1944–1948	Atlantic	8xCD; reissued 2015 on Savoy Jazz
2002	The Complete Savoy & Dial Master Takes	Savoy Jazz	3xCD
2003	The Complete Verve Master Takes	Verve	3xCD; metal box

=== 10" shellac singles ===
==== Dial ====
- "Cool Blues" c/w "Bird's Nest"
- "Crazeology" c/w "Crazeology II: 3 Ways of Playing a Chorus"

=== Appears on ===
- Norman Granz Jazz Concert #1 (Norgran, MG JC #1, 1950) – live; 7x7", reissued 1953 on 2xLP; reissued 1956 on Columbia over two volumes
- Norman Granz' Jam Session, #1 (Mercury/Clef, MG C-601, 1950) – live; compiled on The Parker Jam Session (Verve, 1974)
- Norman Granz' Jam Session, #2 (Clef/Mercury, MG C-602, 1950) – live; compiled on The Parker Jam Session (Verve, 1974)
- Jazz at the Philharmonic, Vol. 2
- Jazz at the Philharmonic, Vol. 4
- Jazz at the Philharmonic, Vol. 7
- Jazz at the Philharmonic - The Ella Fitzgerald Set
- Potpourri of Jazz
- Jazz at the Philharmonic – J.A.T.P. at Carnegie Hall 1949 (Pablo, 2002)
- Various artists – Anthropology (Spotlight, 1972) – compilation
- Various artists – The Birth of Bop, Volume 1 (Savoy, MG 9022, 1952, 10") – compilation, one track
- Various artists – Bird - Diz - Bud - Max (Savoy, MG 9034, 1953, 10") – compilation, five tracks
- Various artists – The Jazz Scene (Clef, 1955) – compilation, two tracks
- Various artists – Our Best (Clef, MG C-639, 1955) – compilation, one track
- Various artists – Alto Saxes (Norgran, 1955) – compilation, three tracks
- Various artists – The Many Faces of the Blues (Savoy, MG 12125, 1957) – compilation, one track
- Various artists – The Jazz Hour (Savoy, MG 12126, 1957) – compilation, one track

== As sideman ==
=== With Miles Davis ===
- Collectors' Items (Prestige PRLP 7044, 1956)

=== With Allen Eager ===
- In the Land of Oo-Bla-Dee 1947–1953 (Uptown, 2003) – compilation; Parker appears on three tracks

=== With Dizzy Gillespie ===
- Groovin' High (Savoy, 1955) – compilation
- In the Beginning (Prestige, 1973) – 2xLP, compilation
- The Complete RCA Victor Recordings (Bluebird, 1995) – compilation

=== With Machito ===
- Afro-Cuban Jazz: The Music of Chico O'Farrill (Clef, MG C-689, 1956)

=== With Jay McShann ===
- Early Bird (Spotlight, 1973) – as Jay McShann Orchestra featuring Charlie Parker; compilation
  - Early Bird (1940–1943) (RCA, ?, France) – as Jay McShann, Charlie Parker; reissue
  - Early Bird (Stash, 1991) – as Charlie Parker with Jay McShann and His Orchestra; reissue

=== With Charles Mingus ===
- The Complete Debut Recordings (Debut, 1990) – box set; Parker appears on Jazz at Massey Hall tracks

=== With Red Norvo ===
- Red Norvo's Fabulous Jam Session (Dial 903, 1951)
  - Once There Was Bird (Charlie Parker, PLP 408, 1962) – under Parker's name

=== With Bud Powell ===
- Summer Broadcasts 1953 (ESP-Disk', ESP 3023, 1977) – live; Parker appears on two tracks

=== With Gene Roland ===
- The Band That Never Was (Spotlight, 1979) – as Gene Roland Band Featuring Charlie Parker

== Compilations and live albums ==
1948

- Charlie Parker on the Air, Vol. 1 (Everest)

1949

- The Metronome All Stars - From Swing to Be-Bop (RCA Camden)
- Bird on the Road (Jazz Showcase)
- Charlie Parker - Bird in Paris (Bird in Paris)
- Charlie Parker in France 1949 (Jazz O.P. (France))
- Charlie Parker - Bird Box, Vol. 2 (Jazz Up (Italy))
- Dance of the Infidels (S.C.A.M.)

1950

- Charlie Parker Live Birdland 1950 (EPM Musique (F) FDC 5710)
- Charlie Parker at the Apollo Theater and St. Nick's Arena (Zim ZM 1007)
- Charlie Parker - Fats Navarro - Bud Powell (Ozone 4)
- Charlie Parker - Bud Powell - Fats Navarro (Ozone 9)
- Charlie Parker - Just Friends (S.C.A.M. JPG 4)
- Charlie Parker - Apartment Jam Sessions (Zim ZM 1006)
- The Persuasively Coherent Miles Davis (Alto AL 701)
- Charlie Parker - Ultimate Bird 1949-50 (Grotto 495)
- Charlie Parker - Ballads and Birdland (Klacto (E) MG 101)
- Charlie Parker at the Pershing Ballroom Chicago 1950 (Zim ZM 1003)
- Charlie Parker - More Unissued, Vol. 2 (Royal Jazz (D) RJD 506)

1951

- Charlie Parker - Bird Meets Birks (Klacto (E) MG 102)
- Charlie Parker Live Boston, Philadelphia, Brooklyn 1951 (EPM Musique (F) FDC 5711)
- Charlie Parker - Bird with the Herd 1951 (Alamac QSR 2442)
- Charlie Parker - More Unissued, Vol. 1 (Royal Jazz (D) RJD 505)

1952

- Charlie Parker - New Bird, Vol. 2 (Phoenix LP 12)
- Charlie Parker - Cheers (S.C.A.M. JPG 2)

1953

- Charlie Parker/Miles Davis/Dizzy Gillespie - Bird with Miles and Dizzy (Queen Disc (It) Q-002)
- Charlie Parker - Yardbird-DC-53 (VGM 0009)
- Charlie Parker - Star Eyes (Klacto (E) MG 100)
- Charlie Parker - Bird Meets Birks (Mark Gardner (E) MG 102)
- Charlie Parker - New Bird: Hi Hat Broadcasts 1953 (Phoenix LP 10)

1954

- Hi-Hat All Stars, Guest Artists, Charlie Parker (Fresh Sound (Sp) FSR 303)
- Charlie Parker - Kenton and Bird (Jazz Supreme JS 703)
- Charlie Parker - Miles Davis - Lee Konitz (Ozone 2)
- V.A. - Echoes of an Era: The Birdland All Stars Live at Carnegie Hall (Roulette RE 127)

1969

- Bird 'n' Diz the Beginning (Roulette, SK-106/K-106)

== Live albums ==
- Live at Townhall w. Dizzy (1945)
- Jazz at the Philharmonic (1946) (Polygram)
- Jazz at the Philharmonic (1949) (Verve)
- Charlie Parker and the Stars of Modern Jazz at Carnegie Hall (1949) (Jass)
- Bird in France (1949)
- Charlie Parker All Stars Live at the Royal Roost (1949)
- Bird at the Apollo Theatre and St. Nicklas Arena (1950)
- Apartment Jam Sessions (1950)
- Charlie Parker at the Pershing Ballroom Chicago 1950 (1950)
- Happy Bird (1951)
- Live at Rockland Palace (1952)
- Boston - 1952 (1952) (Uptown Records)
- Jam Session (1952) (Polygram)
- At Jirayr Zorthian's Ranch, July 14, 1952 (1952) (Rare Live Recordings)
- The Complete Legendary Rockland Palace Concert (1952)
- Charlie Parker: Montreal 1953 (1953)
- One Night in Washington (1953) (VGM)

== Incomplete list of compositions ==
The following is an incomplete list of compositions written by Charlie Parker:

- "Ah-Leu-Cha"
- "Air Conditioning (Drifting on a Reed)"
- "Another Hairdo"
- "Anthropology" (AKA "Thriving from a Riff")
- "Au Privave"
- "An Oscar for Treadwell"
- Back Home Blues"
- "Ballade"
- "Barbados"
- "Billie's Bounce"
- "Bird Feathers"
- "Bird Gets the Worm"
- "Bird of Paradise"
- "Bloomdido"
- "Blue Bird"
- "Blues (Fast)"
- "Blues for Alice"
- "Buzzy"
- "Card Board"
- "Celebrity"
- "Chasin' the Bird"
- "Cheryl"
- "Chi Chi"
- "Confirmation"
- "Constellation"
- "Cool Blues"
- "Cosmic Rays"
- "Dewey Square"
- "Dexterity"
- "Diverse"
- "Donna Lee" (Miles Davis also claimed authorship)
- "Kim"
- "K.C. Blues"
- "Klaun Stance"
- "Ko-Ko"
- "Laird Baird"
- "Leap Frog"
- "Marmaduke"
- "Merry-Go-Round"
- "Moose the Mooche"
- "Mohawk"
- "My Little Suede Shoes"
- "Now's the Time"
- "Ornithology"
- "Parker's Mood"
- "Passport"
- "Perhaps"
- "Quasimodo"
- "Red Cross"
- "Relaxin' at Camarillo"
- "Relaxing with Lee"
- "Scrapple from the Apple"
- "Segment"
- "Shawnuff" (with Dizzy Gillespie)
- "She Rote"
- "Si Si"
- "Steeplechase"
- "The Bird"
- "Visa"
- "Warming Up a Riff"
- "Yardbird Suite"
