= The Genius of Charlie Parker =

Studio album by Charlie Parker
- Released: 1956
- Recorded: November 26 & December 29, 1945; May 8 & December 21, 1947; September 18 & September 24, 1948
- Genre: Jazz, bebop
- Label: Savoy; MG 12014
- Producer: Teddy Reig

Charlie Parker chronology
Charlie Parker Memorial, Vol. 2 (1956)	The Genius of Charlie Parker (1956)	The Charlie Parker Story (1956)

The Genius of Charlie Parker is an LP record by Charlie Parker, released posthumously by Savoy Records. All but one of tracks on this album had been previously released on other formats (78 rpm records, 7-inch EPs and 10-inch LPs), but is the first 12-inch release of these master takes. It contains selections from six sessions recorded between 1944 and 1948, and contains a previously unreleased alternate take from one these sessions.

== Background ==
Charlie Parker recorded seven studio sessions for Savoy Records between 1944 and 1948; five as a leader, two as a sideman. Twenty-nine tracks from these sessions were released by Savoy on 78 rpm records. Twenty-seven of these tracks were reissued on 7-inch EPs and 10-inch LPs under Parker's name (the other two tracks featuring vocals by guitarist Tiny Grimes). The longer playing 12-inch LP became popular in the mid-1950s and Savoy inaugurated its 12-inch LP series with two albums (Charlie Parker Memorial, Vol. 1 [Savoy 12000] and The Immortal Charlie Parker [Savoy MG 12001]) which reissued previously released master takes along with previously unreleased alternate takes. Savoy released three more 12-inch albums (this album, Charlie Parker Memorial, Vol. 2 [Savoy MG 12009] and The Charlie Parker Story [Savoy MG 12079]) completing the reissue of the previously released master takes, and the original issue of most of the unreleased takes from these seven sessions. Parker's entire Savoy ouvre was finally issued on Charlie Parker: The Complete Savoy Studio Sessions in 1978.

The master take of "Koko", included here, is controversial in that it is unclear who, precisely, plays trumpet and\or piano on the track. The liner notes credit Miles Davis with trumpet for the session, but also credit Dizzy Gillespie with both trumpet and piano. Several sources claim Gillespie played trumpet on this track, while others deny it. Some sources claim Gillespie also played piano on this track, while others credit pianist Sadik Hakim. See the article on The Charlie Parker Story for further discussion.

The December 29, 1945 session was led by guitarist, pianist and vocalist Slim Gaillard, and was originally recorded for Bel-Tone Records in Hollywood, California, which released these tracks on 78 rpm records. When Bel-tone folded the rights to Slim Gaillard's recordings were acquired by Majestic Records which reissued these tracks, also on 78 rpm records. When Majestic folded, Savoy acquired the rights to this recording and subsequently issued the tracks on 7-inch EP and 10-inch LP records. This is the first 12-inch LP issue of these tracks.

== Track list ==
The names of the takes are as listed in the liner notes of the album. Previously released takes are shown in boldface.

All tracks are written by Charlie Parker, except where noted.

Side A
No.	Title	Length
1.	"**Bird Gets the Worm**" (Orig. Take 3 (Note: Originally released on 78 rpm Savoy 952. Previously released on Savoy XP 8002: Charlie Parker, Vol. 3 (7-inch EP) and Savoy MG 9010: Charlie Parker, Vol. 3 (10-inch LP).))	2:35
2.	"**Bluebird**" (Orig. Take 3 (Note: Originally released on 78 rpm Savoy 961. Previously released on Savoy XP 8003: Charlie Parker, Vol. 4 (7-inch EP) and Savoy MG 9010: Charlie Parker, Vol. 3 (10-inch LP).))	2:50
3.	"**Klaunstance**" (Orig. Take 3 (Note: Originally released on 78 rpm Savoy 967. Previously released on Savoy XP 8004: Charlie Parker, Vol. 5 (7-inch EP) and Savoy MG 9001: Charlie Parker, Vol. 2 (10-inch LP).))	2:45
4.	"**Barbados**" (Orig. Take 4 (Note: Originally released on 78 rpm Savoy 936. Previously released on Savoy XP 8003: Charlie Parker, Vol. 4 (7-inch EP) and Savoy MG 9011: Charlie Parker, Vol. 4 (10-inch LP).))	2:25
5.	"**Merry-Go-Round**" (Orig. Take 2 (Note: Originally released on 78 rpm Savoy 937. Previously released on Savoy XP 8004: Charlie Parker, Vol. 5 (7-inch EP) and Savoy MG 9011: Charlie Parker, Vol. 4 (10-inch LP).))	2:25
6.	"**Donna Lee**" (Orig. Take 4 (Note: Originally released on 78 rpm Savoy 652. Previously released on 78 rpm Savoy 928, Savoy XP 8001: Charlie Parker, Vol. 2 (7-inch EP) and Savoy MG 9000: Charlie Parker, Vol. 1 (10-inch LP).))	2:30
7.	"**Chasing the Bird**" (Orig. Take 3 (Note: Originally released on 78 rpm Savoy 977. Previously released on Savoy XP 8002: Charlie Parker, Vol. 3 (7-inch EP) and Savoy MG 9000: Charlie Parker, Vol. 1 (10-inch LP).))	2:40

Side B
No.	Title	Writer(s)	Length
1.	"**Koko**" (Orig. Master (Note: Originally released on 78 rpm Savoy 597. Previously released on 78 rpm Savoy 916, Savoy XP 8001: Charlie Parker, Vol. 2 (7-inch EP), Savoy XP 8097: Bird – Diz – Bud – Max, Vol. 1 (7-inch EP, as "Co-Coa"), Savoy MG 9000: Charlie Parker, Vol. 1 (10-inch LP) and Savoy MG 9034: Bird – Diz – Bud – Max (10-inch LP, as "Co-Coa").))		2:53
2.	"Perhaps" (New Take 1)		2:33
3.	"**Warming up a Riff**" (Orig. Master (Note: Originally released on 78 rpm Savoy 945. Previously released on Savoy XP 8001: Charlie Parker, Vol. 2 and Savoy MG 9000: Charlie Parker, Vol. 1 (10-inch LP).))		2:32
4.	"**Slim's Jam**" (Orig. Master (Note: Originally released on 78 rpm Bel-tone 761. Previously released on 78 rpm Majestic 9001 and 10000, Savoy XP 8098: Bird – Diz – Bud – Max, Vol. 2 (7-inch EP) and Savoy MG 9034: Bird – Diz – Bud – Max (10-inch EP).))	Slim Gaillard	2:30
5.	"**Poppity Pop**" (Orig. Master (Note: Originally released on 78 rpm Bel-tone 753. Previously released on 78 rpm Majestic 9001 and 10001, Savoy XP 8098: Bird – Diz – Bud – Max, Vol. 2 (7-inch EP) and Savoy MG 9034: Bird – Diz – Bud – Max (10-inch EP).))	Slim Gaillard	2:21
6.	"**Dizzy Boogie**" (Orig. Master (Note: Originally released on 78 rpm Bel-tone 753. Previously released on 78 rpm Majestic 9002 and 10000, and Savoy XP 8097: Bird – Diz – Bud – Max, Vol. 1 (7-inch EP).))	Slim Gaillard	2:25
7.	"**Flat Foot Floogie**" (Orig. Master (Note: Originally released on 78 rpm Bel-tone 758. Previously released on 78 rpm Majestic 9002 and 10001, and Savoy XP 8097: Bird – Diz – Bud – Max, Vol. 1 (7-inch EP).))	Slim Gaillard, Bud Green, Slam Stewart	2:18

== Personnel ==
- Charlie Parker – alto saxophone
- Miles Davis – trumpet (tracks A1–A7, B1–B3) (Note: The liner notes credit Miles Davis on trumpet and Dizzy Gillespie on piano and trumpet for "Koko", with no further clarification. Charlie Parker: The Complete Savoy Studio Sessions credits Gillespie on trumpet on "Koko", and Sadik Hakim on piano, but other sources disagree. See the article on The Charlie Parker Story for further discussion.)
- Jack McVea – tenor saxophone (tracks B4–B7)
- Slim Gaillard – guitar, piano and vocals (tracks B4–B7)
- Dizzy Gillespie – piano (tracks B1 and B3) and trumpet (tracks B1, B4–B7)
- Sadik Hakim – piano (track B1)
- Dodo Marmarosa – piano (tracks B4–B7)
- Bud Powell – piano (tracks A6–A7)
- Duke Jordan – piano (tracks A1–A3)
- John Lewis – piano (tracks A4–A5, B2)
- Curley Russell – double bass (tracks A4–A5, B1–B3)
- Bam Brown – double bass (tracks B4–B7)
- Tommy Potter – double bass (tracks A1–A3, A6–A7)
- Max Roach – drums (tracks A1–A7, B1–B3)
- Zutty Singleton – drums (tracks B4–B7)
