= The Immortal Charlie Parker =

Studio album by Charlie Parker
- Released: 1956
- Recorded: September 15, 1944; November 26, 1945; May 8 & August 14, 1947, and September 24, 1948
- Genre: Jazz; bebop
- Length: 46:15
- Label: Savoy; MG 12001
- Producer: Teddy Reig

Charlie Parker chronology
Charlie Parker Memorial, Vol. 1 (1956)	The Immortal Charlie Parker (1956)	Charlie Parker Memorial, Vol. 2 (1956)

Reissue Cover

The Immortal Charlie Parker is an LP record by saxophonist Charlie Parker, released posthumously by Savoy Records. Several tracks on this album had been previously released on other formats (78 rpm records, 7 inch EPs, and 10 inch LPs), but is the first 12-inch release of these master takes. It contains selections from five sessions recorded between 1944 and 1948 and also several previously unreleased alternate takes from these sessions.

== Background ==
Charlie Parker recorded seven studio sessions for Savoy Records between 1944 and 1948; five as a leader and two as a sideman. Twenty-nine tracks from these sessions were released by Savoy on 78 rpm records. Twenty-seven of these tracks were reissued on 7 inch EPs and 10 inch LPs under Parker's name (the other two tracks featuring vocals by guitarist Tiny Grimes). The longer playing 12 inch LP became popular in the mid-1950s and Savoy inaugurated its 12-inch LP series with two albums (this album, and Charlie Parker Memorial, Vol. 1 [Savoy MG 12000]) which reissued previously released master takes along with previously unreleased alternate takes. Savoy released three more 12 inch albums—Charlie Parker Memorial, Vol. 2 [Savoy MG 12009], The Genius of Charlie Parker [Savoy MG 12014], and The Charlie Parker Story [Savoy MG 12079]—completing the reissue of the previously released master takes, and the original issue of most of the unreleased takes from these seven sessions. Parker's entire Savoy oeuvre was finally issued on Charlie Parker: The Complete Savoy Studio Sessions in 1978.

Guitarist Tiny Grimes was the leader of the September 14, 1944 session, which produced the songs "Tiny's Tempo" and "Red Cross". This was also Parker's first recording session for the Savoy label.

Miles Davis was the leader of the August 14, 1947 session which produced the songs "Milestones", "Little Willie Leaps", "Sipping at Bells", and "Half Nelson". Davis also wrote all the songs for this session and persuaded Parker to play tenor saxophone instead of his usual alto.

== Track list ==
Multiple takes may be combined into a single LP track; these are reflected in the listings below. Names of the takes are as listed in the liner notes of the album. Previously released takes are shown in boldface.

All tracks are written by Charlie Parker, except where noted.

Side A
No.	Title	Writer(s)	Length
1.	"Little Willie Leaps" (short – take 1) "Little Willie Leaps" (new – take 2)	Miles Davis	3:45
2.	"**Little Willie Leaps**" (original – take 3 (Note: Originally released on 78 rpm Savoy 977. Previously released on Savoy XP 8006: Charlie Parker, Vol. 7 (7 inch EP), Savoy XP 8098: Bird - Diz - Bud - Max, Vol. 2 (7 inch EP, as "Wailing Willie"), Savoy MG 9001: Charlie Parker, Vol. 2 (10 inch LP) and Savoy MG 9034: Bird - Diz - Bud - Max (10 inch EP, as "Wailing Willie").))	Miles Davis	2:50
3.	"Donna Lee" (new – take 1) "Donna Lee" (new – take 2)		5:28
4.	"Chasing the Bird" (new – take 1)		2:53
5.	"Cheryl" (short – take 1) "**Cheryl**" (original – take 2 (Note: Originally released on 78 rpm Savoy 952. Previously released on Savoy XP 8003: Charlie Parker, Vol. 4 (7 inch EP) and Savoy MG 9001: Charlie Parker, Vol. 2 (10 inch LP).))		2:49
6.	"Milestones" (new – take 2)	Miles Davis	2:45
7.	"Half Nelson" (new – take 1)	Miles Davis	2:50

Side B
No.	Title	Writer(s)	Length
1.	"Sipping at Bells" (short – take 3) "Sipping at Bells" (new – take 4)	Miles Davis	3:24
2.	"Tiny's Tempo" (short – take 1) "Tiny's Tempo" (short – take 2) "**Tiny's Tempo**" (original – take 3 (Note: Originally released on 78 rpm Savoy 526. Previously released on 78 rpm Savoy 541 and 914, Savoy XP 8000: Charlie Parker, Vol. 1 (7 inch EP) and Savoy MG 9010: Charlie Parker, Vol. 3 (10 inch LP).))	Tiny Grimes and Clyde Hart	5:37
3.	"Red Cross" (short – take 1) "**Red Cross**" (original – take 2 (Note: Originally released on 78 rpm Savoy 532. Previously released on 78 rpm Savoy 541, 567 and 914, Savoy XP 8000: Charlie Parker, Vol. 1 (7 ince EP) and Savoy MG 9000: Charlie Parker, Vol. 1 (10 inch LP).))		4:27
4.	"**Now's the Time**" (original (Note: Originally released on 78 rpm Savoy 573. Previously released on 78 rpm Savoy 918, Savoy XP 8000: Charlie Parker, Vol. 1 (7 inch EP) and Savoy MG 9000: Charlie Parker, Vol. 1 (10 inch LP).))		3:12
5.	"Buzzy" (short – take 2) "Buzzy" (new – take 3)		3:05
6.	"Marmaduke" (short – take 3) "Marmaduke" (new – take 4)		3:00

== Personnel ==
- Charlie Parker – alto and tenor saxophone
- Miles Davis – trumpet (tracks A1–A7, B1, B4–B6)
- Tiny Grimes – guitar (tracks B2–B3)
- Clyde Hart – piano (tracks B2–B3)
- Dizzy Gillespie – piano (track B4)
- Bud Powell – piano (tracks A3–A5, B5)
- John Lewis – piano (tracks A1–A2, A6–A7, B1, B6)
- Jimmy Butts – double bass (tracks B2–B3)
- Curley Russell – double bass (tracks B4, B6)
- Tommy Potter – double bass (tracks A3–A5, B5)
- Nelson Boyd – double bass (tracks A1–A2, A6–A7, B1)
- Doc West – drums (tracks B2–B3)
- Max Roach – drums (tracks A1–A7, B1, B4–B6)
