= Charlie Parker Memorial, Vol. 2 =

Studio album by Charlie Parker
- Released: 1956
- Recorded: November 16, 1945; May 8, 1947; August 14, 1947; September 18, 1948 and September 24, 1948
- Genre: Jazz, bebop
- Length: 41:22
- Label: Savoy; MG 12009
- Producer: Teddy Reig

Charlie Parker chronology
The Immortal Charlie Parker (1956)	Charlie Parker Memorial, Vol. 2 (1956)	The Genius of Charlie Parker (1956)

Charlie Parker Memorial, Vol. 2 is an LP record by Charlie Parker, released posthumously by Savoy Records. Several tracks on this album had been previously released on other formats (78 rpm records, 7 inch EPs and 10 inch LPs), but is the first 12-inch release of these master takes. It contains selections from five sessions recorded between 1945 and 1948, and contains several previously unreleased alternate takes from these sessions.

== Background ==
Charlie Parker recorded seven studio sessions for Savoy Records between 1944 and 1948; five as a leader, two as a sideman. Twenty-nine tracks from these sessions were released by Savoy on 78 rpm records. Twenty-seven of these tracks were reissued on 7 inch EPs and 10 inch LPs under Parker's name (the other two tracks featuring vocals by guitarist Tiny Grimes). The longer playing 12 inch LP became popular in the mid-1950s and Savoy inaugurated its 12-inch LP series with two albums (Charlie Parker Memorial, Vol. 1 [Savoy MG 12000] and The Immortal Charlie Parker [Savoy MG 12001]) which reissued previously released master takes along with previously unreleased alternate takes. Savoy released three more 12 inch albums (this album, The Genius of Charlie Parker [Savoy MG 12014], and The Charlie Parker Story [Savoy MG 12079]) completing the reissue of the previously released master takes, and the original issue of most of the unreleased takes from these seven sessions. Parker's entire Savoy ouvre was finally issued on Charlie Parker: The Complete Savoy Studio Sessions in 1978.

Miles Davis was the leader of the August 14, 1947 session which produced the songs "Milestones", "Half Nelson" and "Sipping at Bells". Davis also wrote all the songs for this session and persuaded Parker to play tenor saxophone instead of his usual alto.

== Track list ==
Multiple takes may be combined into a single LP track, these are reflected in the listings below. Names of the takes are as listed in the liner notes of the album. Previously released takes are shown in boldface.

All tracks are written by Charlie Parker, except where noted.

Side A
No.	Title	Length
1.	"Barbados" (short-take 2) "Barbados" (new-take 3)	3:20
2.	"Constellation" (short-take 3) "**Constellation**" (orig.-take 4 (Note: Originally released on 78 rpm Savoy 939. Previously released on Savoy XP 8006: Charlie Parker, Vol. 7 (7 inch EP) and Savoy MG 9011: Charlie Parker, Vol. 4 (10 inch LP).))	2:52
3.	"Parker's Mood" (short-take 2) "**Parker's Mood**" (orig.-take 3 (Note: Originally released on 78 rpm Savoy 936. Previously released on Savoy XP 8001: Charlie Parker, Vol. 2 (7 inch EP) and Savoy MG 9010: Charlie Parker, Vol. 3 (10 inch LP).))	5:10
4.	"Perhaps" (short-take 2) "Perhaps" (new-take 3)	2:35
5.	"Marmaduke" (short-take 5) "**Marmaduke**" (orig.-take 6 (Note: Originally released on 78 rpm Savoy 938. Previously released on Savoy XP 8006: Charlie Parker, Vol. 7 (7 inch EP) and Savoy MG 9011: Charlie Parker, Vol. 4 (10 inch LP).))	4:25
6.	"Donna Lee" (new-take 3)	2:33

Side B
No.	Title	Writer(s)	Length
1.	"Chasing the Bird" (new-take 2)		3:00
2.	"Buzzy" (new-take 1)		2:55
3.	"**Milestones**" (orig.-take 1 (Note: Originally released on 78 rpm Savoy 934. Previously released on Savoy XP 8004: Charlie Parker, Vol. 5 (7 inch EP) and Savoy MG 9001: Charlie Parker, Vol. 2 (10 inch LP).))	Miles Davis	2:35
4.	"**Half Nelson**" (orig.-take 2 (Note: Originally released on 78 rpm Savoy 951. Previously released on Savoy XP 8005: Charlie Parker, Vol. 6 (7 inch EP) and Savoy MG 9000: Charlie Parker, Vol. 1 (10 inch LP).))	Miles Davis	2:45
5.	"Sippin' at Bells" (short-take 1) "**Sippin' at Bells**" (orig.-take 2 (Note: Originally released on 78 rpm Savoy 934. Previously released on Savoy XP 8004: Charlie Parker, Vol. 5 (7 inch EP) and Savoy MG 9000: Charlie Parker, Vol. 1 (10 inch LP).))	Miles Davis	3:15
6.	"**Billie's Bounce**" (original (Note: Originally released on 78 rpm Savoy 573. Previously released on 78 rpm Savoy 918, Savoy XP 8000: Charlie Parker, Vol. 1 (7 inch EP) and Savoy MG 9001: Charlie Parker, Vol. 2 (10 inch LP).))		3:07
7.	"**Thriving on a Riff**" (original (Note: Originally released on 78 rpm Savoy 903 (as "Thriving from a Riff"). Previously released on 78 rpm Savoy 945, Savoy 8006: Charlie Parker, Vol. 7 (7 inch EP) and Savoy MG 9001: Charlie Parker, Vol. 2 (10 inch LP).))		2:50

== Personnel ==
- Charlie Parker - alto and tenor saxophone
- Miles Davis - trumpet
- Dizzy Gillespie - piano (track B6) (Note: Gillespie is listed as pianist on both tracks B6 and B7 in the liner notes. However, Hakim (aka Argonne Thornton) is credited on piano for "Thriving on a Riff" in Charlie Parker: The Complete Savoy Studio Sessions. See the article on The Charlie Parker Story for more information.)
- Sadik Hakim - piano (track B7)
- Bud Powell - piano (tracks A6, B1-B2)
- John Lewis - piano (tracks A1-A5, B3-B5)
- Curley Russell - double bass (tracks A1-A5, B6-B7)
- Tommy Potter - double bass (tracks A6, B1-B2)
- Nelson Boyd - double bass (tracks B3-B5)
- Max Roach - drums
