= Charlie Parker Memorial, Vol. 1 =

Studio album by Charlie Parker
- Released: 1956
- Recorded: May 8, 1947; December 21, 1947; September 18, 1948 and September 24, 1948
- Genre: Jazz, bebop
- Label: Savoy; MG 12000
- Producer: Teddy Reig

Charlie Parker chronology
Big Band (1954)	Charlie Parker Memorial, Vol. 1 (1956)	The Immortal Charlie Parker (1956)

Charlie Parker Memorial, Vol. 1 is an LP record by Charlie Parker, released posthumously by Savoy Records. Several tracks on this album had been previously released on other formats (78 rpm records, 7 inch EPs and 10 inch LPs), but is the first 12-inch release of these master takes. It contains selections from four sessions recorded in 1947 and 1948, and contains several previously unreleased alternate takes from these sessions.

== Background ==
Charlie Parker recorded seven studio sessions for Savoy Records between 1944 and 1948; five as a leader, two as a sideman. Twenty-nine tracks from these sessions were released by Savoy on 78 rpm records. Twenty-seven of these tracks were reissued on 7 inch EPs and 10 inch LPs under Parker's name (the other two tracks featuring vocals by guitarist Tiny Grimes). The longer playing 12 inch LP became popular in the mid-1950s and Savoy inaugurated its 12-inch LP series with two albums (this album, and The Immortal Charlie Parker [Savoy MG 12001]) which reissued previously released master takes along with previously unreleased alternate takes. Savoy released three more 12 inch albums (Charlie Parker Memorial, Vol. 2 [Savoy MG 12009], The Genius of Charlie Parker [Savoy MG 12014], and The Charlie Parker Story [Savoy MG 12079]) completing the reissue of the previously released master takes, and the original issue of most of the unreleased takes from these seven sessions. Parker's entire Savoy ouvre was finally issued on Charlie Parker: The Complete Savoy Studio Sessions in 1978.

== Track listing ==
Multiple takes may be combined into a single LP track, these are reflected in the listings below. Names of the takes are as listed in the liner notes of the album. Previously released takes are shown in boldface.

All music is composed by Charlie Parker.

Side A
No.	Title	Length
1.	"Another Hair-Do" (Short-Take 1) "Another Hair-Do" (Short-Take 2) "**Another Hair-Do**" (Orig.-Take 3 (Note: Originally released on 78 rpm Savoy 961. Previously released on Savoy XP 8002: Charlie Parker, Vol. 3 (7 inch EP) and Savoy MG 9001: Charlie Parker, Vol. 2 (10 inch LP).))	3:19
2.	"Bluebird" (New-Take 1)	2:52
3.	"Bird Gets the Worm" (New-Take 1)	3:00
4.	"Barbados" (New-Take 1)	2:34
5.	"Constellation" (Short-Take 2) "Constellation" (New-Take 1)	4:34
6.	"Parker's Mood" (New-Take 1)	3:31

Side B
No.	Title	Length
1.	"Ah-Leu-Cha" (Short-Take 1) "**Ah-Leu-Cha**" (Orig.-Take 2)	3:20
2.	"Perhaps" (Short-Take 4) "Perhaps" (New-Take 5)	3:10
3.	"**Perhaps**" (Orig.-Take 6 (Note: Originally released on 78 rpm Savoy 938. Previously released on Savoy XP 8003: Charlie Parker, Vol. 4 (7 inch EP) and Savoy MG 9010: Charlie Parker, Vol. 3 (10 inch LP).))	2:35
4.	"Marmaduke" (Short-Take 1) "Marmaduke" (New-Take 2)	3:57
5.	"**Steeplechase**" (Orig.-Take 1 (Note: Originally released on 78 rpm Savoy 937. Previously released on Savoy XP 8005: Charlie Parker, Vol. 6 (7 inch EP) and Savoy MG 9010: Charlie Parker, Vol. 3 (10 inch LP).))	3:00
6.	"Merry-Go-Round" (New-Take 1)	2:15
7.	"Buzzy" (Short-Take 4) "**Buzzy**" (Orig.-Take 5 (Note: Originally released on 78 rpm Savoy 652. Previously released on 78 rpm Savoy 928, Savoy XP 8002: Charlie Parker, Vol. 3 (7 inch EP) and Savoy MG 9001: Charlie Parker, Vol. 2 (10 inch LP).))	2:47

== Personnel ==
- Charlie Parker – alto saxophone
- Miles Davis – trumpet
- Bud Powell – piano (track B7)
- Duke Jordan – piano (tracks A1-A3)
- John Lewis – piano (tracks A4-A6, B1-B6)
- Tommy Potter – double bass (tracks A1-A3, B7)
- Curley Russell – double bass (tracks A4-A6, B1-B6)
- Max Roach – drums
