= Now's the Time: the Quartet of Charlie Parker =

Studio album by Charlie Parker
- Released: 1956
- Recorded: December 30, 1952; July 28, 1953
- Genre: Bebop
- Length: 38:49
- Label: Verve
- Producer: Norman Granz

Charlie Parker chronology
| The Charlie Parker Story (1956) | Now's the Time: the Quartet of Charlie Parker (1956) | The Cole Porter Songbook (1956) |

Now's the Time: the Quartet of Charlie Parker, also released as The Genius of Charlie Parker, Vol. 3, is a studio album by alto saxophonist Charlie Parker (Bird) and his quartet. It was recorded in 1952 and 1953 and released posthumously in 1956 by Verve.

== History ==
The first session took place on December 30, 1952, with Parker, pianist Hank Jones, bassist Teddy Kotick, and drummer Max Roach. The second session on July 28, 1953, saw Al Haig replacing Jones and Percy Heath replacing Kotick.

Tracks from the sessions also contributed to the compilation album, Charlie Parker, released in LP form by Verve Records.

== Reception ==
Professional ratings
Review scores
| Source | Rating |
|---|---|
| AllMusic | 3/5 stars |
| The Penguin Guide to Jazz | 4/4 stars |

AllMusic critic Robert Taylor praised the album, writing, "Now's the Time captures Charlie Parker during one of his peak recording periods... There are numerous outtakes, which offer a fascinating analysis of Parker's improvisations". He highlighted the "excellent recording quality" of the session. The Penguin Guide to Jazz rated the album 4 out of 4 stars.

== Track listing ==
All compositions by Charlie Parker unless otherwise stated

1. "The Song Is You" (Jerome Kern, Oscar Hammerstein II) – 2:56
2. "Laird Baird" – 2:44
3. "Kim" (Master Take) – 2:59
4. "Kim" (Alternate Take) – 2:58
5. "Cosmic Rays" (Master Take) – 3:04
6. "Cosmic Rays" (Alternate Take) – 3:16
7. "Chi-Chi" (Alternate Take) – 3:05
8. "Chi-Chi" (Alternate Take) – 2:41
9. "Chi-Chi" (Alternate Take) – 2:36
10. "Chi-Chi" (Master Take) – 3:05
11. "I Remember You" (Victor Schertzinger, Johnny Mercer) – 3:02
12. "Now's the Time" – 3:01
13. "Confirmation" – 2:58

== Personnel ==
- Charlie Parker – alto saxophone
- Al Haig – piano (tracks 7–13)
- Hank Jones – piano (1–6)
- Percy Heath – bass (7–13)
- Teddy Kotick – bass (1–6)
- Max Roach – drums

== See also ==
- Bird changes
