= Summit Meeting at Birdland =

Live album by Charlie Parker
- Released: 1977
- Recorded: March 31, 1951; March 23, 1953; May 9, 1953
- Venue: Birdland, New York City
- Genre: Jazz
- Label: Columbia

Charlie Parker chronology
One Night in Birdland (1977)	Summit Meeting at Birdland (1977)	Inglewood Jam (1978)

Summit Meeting at Birdland is a live album by alto saxophonist Charlie Parker recorded at Birdland in New York City in 1951 and 1953. It was released by Columbia Records in 1977.

== History ==
The first side of the album, recorded in 1951, includes Parker with sidemen Dizzy Gillespie on trumpet, Bud Powell on piano, Tommy Potter on bass, and Roy Haynes on drums. A March 1953 club date with Parker and the Milt Buckner Trio produced one track, "Groovin' High". The final May gig with Parker and pianist John Lewis, bassist Curley Russell, drummer Kenny Clarke, and percussionist Cándido Camero completed the B-side of the LP.

== Reception ==
Professional ratings
Review scores
Source	Rating
AllMusic	4.5/5 stars

AllMusic critic Scott Yanow praised the album's "stirring" A-side and stated that the recording quality was "acceptable". Brian Priestley described the A-side with Gillespie and Powell as "a sparkling 25 minutes" in his biography of Parker.

== Track listing ==
1. "Blue 'n' Boogie" (Gillespie, Frank Paparelli) – 7:24
2. "Anthropology" (Parker, Gillespie) – 5:47
3. "'Round Midnight" (Thelonious Monk) – 3:35
4. "A Night in Tunisia" (Gillespie) – 5:16
5. "Groovin' High" (Gillespie) – 3:51
6. "Cool Blues" (Parker) – 4:20
7. "Star Eyes" (Gene de Paul, Don Raye) – 5:10
8. "Moose the Mooche" (Parker) / "Lullaby of Birdland" (George Shearing) – 5:32
9. "Broadway" (Wilbur H. Bird, Teddy McRae, Henri Woode) / "Lullaby of Birdland" (Shearing) – 3:16

== Personnel ==
- Charlie Parker – alto saxophone
- Dizzy Gillespie – trumpet (tracks 1–4)
- Milt Buckner – organ (5)
- Bernie McKay – guitar (5)
- Bud Powell – piano (1–4)
- John Lewis – piano (6–9)
- Tommy Potter – bass (1–4)
- Curley Russell – bass (6–9)
- Kenny Clarke – drums (6–9)
- Roy Haynes – drums (1–4)
- Cornelius Thomas – drums (5)
- Cándido Camero – percussion (8–9)
