= Ko-Ko =

1945 single by Charlie Parker

"Ko Ko" (also spelled "Ko-Ko" or "Koko") is a 1945 bebop recording composed by Charlie Parker. The original recorded version lists Parker on alto saxophone with trumpeter Miles Davis, double bassist Curley Russell and drummer Max Roach. Due to the absence of Bud Powell, Dizzy Gillespie was enlisted to play piano, instead of his usual trumpet. Pianist Sadik Hakim, then known as Argonne Thornton, was also known to be present at the session. Rumors persist to this day about precisely who played trumpet and piano on this piece; some say it's young Miles Davis who plays trumpet and Gillespie comping at piano, on both takes; most say Gillespie plays trumpet and, or instead of, piano; some say Hakim is the pianist on all or part of one or both of the takes. However, Miles Davis confirms in his autobiography that he did not play trumpet on "Ko Ko":

"I remember Bird wanting me to play "Ko-Ko," a tune that was based on the changes of "Cherokee." Now Bird knew I was having trouble playing "Cherokee" back then. So when he said that that was the tune he wanted me to play, I just said no, I wasn't going to do it. That's why Dizzy's playing trumpet on "Ko-Ko," "Warmin' up a Riff," and "Meandering" on Charlie Parker’s Reboppers, because I wasn't going to get out there and embarrass myself. I didn't really think I was ready to play tunes at the tempo of "Cherokee" and I didn't make no bones about it."

Dizzy Gillespie also confirms that he played trumpet on "Ko Ko" in an interview with Stanley Crouch in 1986, and that the trumpet intro was composed by Charlie Parker.

The song begins with a harmonically ambiguous introduction but quickly transitions to B flat major at the top of Parker's first solo chorus. At this point, the harmony is now based upon the chord changes of the song "Cherokee" by Ray Noble. A drum solo by Max Roach ends the transition. The closing material is very similar to the introduction and features an unexpected ending.

== Overview ==
A recording ban, imposed by the American Federation of Musicians from 1942 to 1944, prevented musicians in the nascent bebop movement from recording new works during the crucial formative period of this emerging genre. As a result, the "Ko Ko" session, along with the "Shaw 'Nuff" session led by Dizzy Gillespie earlier in the year, is considered by many to be the very first time Bebop was ever recorded.

Charlie Parker said that while playing Ray Noble's tune "Cherokee", "I found that by using the higher intervals of a chord as a melody line and backing them with appropriately related changes, I could play the thing I'd been hearing." He had played that piece so many times that by the end he hated it, but he had mastered the chords perfectly in all 12 keys. "Ko Ko" has a partially improvised head and the chords are based on "Cherokee".

In 2002, the Library of Congress added "Ko Ko" to the National Recording Registry.

== Recording session ==
Charlie Parker's Ri Bop Boys – Ko Ko

"Ko Ko" was recorded on November 26, 1945, at WOR studios in New York City. In the booklet accompanying Charlie Parker: The Complete Savoy Studio Sessions author James Patrick gives a full account of the session, informed by "[d]ocuments from the Savoy files and the recollections of Teddy Reig, who produced the session ..."

A standard three hour/four side session was scheduled for November 26, 1945, at the WOR studios in New York for which Parker would supply original composititions. A Union contract was arranged the preceding week and Parker; Miles Davis, trumpet; Bud Powell, piano; Curly Russell, bass; and Max Roach, drums, were booked for the date. On the 26th Reig went to Parker's apartment to bring Bird to WOR and was informed the Powell had gone with his mother to Philadelphia where she was buying a house. No need to worry, however; Dizzy Gillespie was present and introduced to Reig: "Here's your piano player". Parker also had contacted pianist Argonne Thornton (later a.k.a. Sadik Hakim) ... and asked that he appear at the studio ...

Other recordings at this session were "Billie's Bounce", "Warming Up a Riff", "Now's the Time", "Thriving on a Riff", and "Meandering". The album The Charlie Parker Story fully documents this session, as does the aforementioned Complete Savoy Studio Sessions box set.

Duke Ellington also wrote and recorded an unrelated song entitled "Ko-Ko" in 1940 at Victor's studios in Chicago. Ellington's version of the song was inducted into the Grammy Hall of Fame in 2011.

== Structure ==
There were two takes:

In both takes the piece starts with a 32-bar introduction that was written by Charlie Parker:

- Bars 1–8 – Alto saxophone and trumpet in unison octaves
- Bars 9–16 – Brief trumpet solo
- Bars 17–24 – Brief saxophone solo
- Bars 25–32 – Alto saxophone and trumpet in thirds/fourths, then briefly in octaves

Following the intro in the first take, sax and trumpet begin the melody of "Cherokee". They are interrupted by someone clapping and whistling and shouting "You can't play that".

After the introduction in the second take are two 64-bar solo choruses from Parker on the saxophone; each chorus follows the Thirty-two-bar form (AABA), except that the number of bars is doubled to 64, partly due to the extensive importance of solos in bebop music, and partly due to the extremely fast 300bpm tempo. The absence of any composed material on this recording, besides the introduction and coda, is a telling example of the bebop musicians' strong emphasis on improvisation first. It is an extremely virtuosic solo, incorporating fast eighth note playing and energetic improvisation. Parker's use of accents keep his phrasing from sounding rhythmically monotonous. This phrasing style gives his bebop soloing a vocal and melodic quality even as his tactfully executed lines fly by at nearly imperceptible speed. The second chorus of Parker's solo opens with a two-bar quote from the notably difficult clarinet piece "High Society", made famous by clarinetist Alphonse Picou. Charlie Parker was known to quote melodies from a variety of musical traditions in his improvised solos, and this particular solo is no exception.

After the solo from Parker is a 32-bar drum solo from drummer Max Roach. The drums for the piece are tuned higher than normal, which gives the solo a brighter, livelier feel. Roach also pushes forward the tempo in an exciting fashion, but it pulls back collectively to the original tempo soon after Parker and Gillespie reenter.

The piece finishes with a 28-bar coda, integrating the main themes from the introduction and improvisation from Parker and Gillespie, and finally an abrupt ending. The ending feels unresolved, like an imperfect cadence, because the bassist, Curly Russell plays an F as the final note. Even without harmonic context, the F sounds like a dominant chord with no resolution due to the strong tonicization of B flat major throughout the recording.

== Releases ==
"Ko Ko" was issued and reissued many times over the years. The original release was as the B-side coupled with Don Byas' rendition of "How High the Moon" on a 78 rpm Savoy 597. This record was reissued as Savoy 916, the Savoy 900 series being dedicated to Bebop. On both records the group was credited as "Charlie Parker's Ri Bop Boys".

The song was subsequently released on Savoy XP 8001: Charlie Parker, Vol. 2 (7 inch EP) and Savoy MG 9000: Charlie Parker, Vol. 1 (10 inch LP) when these formats came into vogue in the early 1950s. It was also released on Savoy XP 8097: Bird – Diz – Bud – Max, Vol. 1 and Savoy MG 9034: Bird – Diz – Bud – Max on the same formats. These were compilations of bebop tracks by Parker, Gillespie, Powell and Roach; on both of these latter releases the title was listed as "Co-coa".

"Ko Ko"'s next release was on Savoy MG 12014: The Genius of Charlie Parker. This was also its first 12-inch LP release. The Charlie Parker Story was released next, which included all of the takes from the entire session. This album was the first to release the aborted first take of "Ko Ko" along with the previously released master take.

The master take of "Ko Ko" was released next on Savoy 12126: The Jazz Hour, a compilation of various Savoy artists; and then on Savoy SJL 2201: Bird/The Savoy Recordings (Master Takes).

And, as noted above, the entire session was reissued again on the box set Charlie Parker: The Complete Savoy Studio Recordings.

CD reissues followed in the 1990s. The Genius of Charlie Parker and The Charlie Parker Story were both reissued on CD by Nippon Columbia. Complete Savoy Masters and Complete Savoy Sessions were issued as CD box sets by Definitive Classics, and this session was included in The Complete Savoy and Dial Studio Recordings 1944–1988 released in 2000 by Atlantic Records.

== See also ==
- List of jazz contrafacts
