= The Charlie Parker Story =

Studio album by Charlie Parker
- Released: 1956
- Recorded: November 26, 1945
- Genre: Jazz, bebop
- Label: Savoy; MG 12079
- Producer: Teddy Reig

Charlie Parker chronology
The Genius of Charlie Parker (1956)	The Charlie Parker Story (1956)	Now's the Time: the Quartet of Charlie Parker (1956)

Original Cover

The Charlie Parker Story is an LP record by Charlie Parker, released posthumously by Savoy Records. While many of the tracks on this album had been previously released on other formats (78 rpm records, 7-inch EPs and singles, and 10- and 12-inch LPs), this is the first album that chronicles the entire session, recorded November 26, 1945, including all takes of all pieces. This session is famous in that it is the first recorded under Parker's name. It is also controversial, in that to this day it is unclear who the pianist and trumpet player are on all of the tracks.

== Background ==
According to the booklet accompanying Charlie Parker: The Complete Savoy Sessions (which consults "documents from the Savoy files and the recollections of Teddy Reig, who produced this session") this was to be "a standard three hours/four side session [that] was scheduled for November 26, 1945, at the WOR studios in New York for which Parker would supply original compositions. A Union contract was arranged the preceding week and Parker; Miles Davis, trumpet; Bud Powell, piano; Curly Russell, bass; and Max Roach, drums were booked for the date. On the 26th Reig went to Parker's apartment to bring Bird to WOR and was informed that Powell had gone with his mother to Philadelphia where she was buying a house. No need to worry, however; Dizzy Gillespie was present and introduced to Reig: 'Here's your piano player'. Parker also had contacted Argonne Thornton (later a.k.a. Sadik Hakim), ... and asked that he appear at the studio."

The author of the liner notes of this album—John Mehegan—is under the impression that Powell was present, adding to the controversy over piano players. That Powell was absent is agreed by other sources, including the personnel listings of all other issues of these recordings, which list Gillespie and\or and Hakim on various tracks, sometimes contradicting each other. On the earliest releases of tracks from the session—on 78 rpm records—the pianist is listed as "Hen Gates", a pseudonym known to be used by Dizzy Gillespie. He was listed thus due to his being under contract to the Musicraft label at the time of the recording. The second 78 rpm release of "Thriving on a Riff" (Savoy 945), though, credits Gillespie on piano; later reissues credit Hakim on this track.

Mehegan mentions Hakim in his notes, stating: "As a final irony, a pianist by the name of Argonne Thornton claims he played the date or at least part of it, although this is denied by Herman Lubinsky, who conducted the session." This denial, though, may be caused by the fact—as other sources state—that Hakim was not yet a member of the New York local Musicians Union, having moved from Chicago, and was told not to play by a local union representative. Hakim himself claims to have played piano on all tunes except "Now's the Time" and "Billie's Bounce". Reig claims that Hakim left before the final "Koko" take, due to the aforementioned local union rep.

"Ko-Ko" is probably the most controversial track on the album. Many sources state that Gillespie is the trumpet player on this track in place of Davis (including the liner notes of one of Davis' own albums: The Musings of Miles). Various reasons are given: the difficulty of the piece was too much for young Miles, his nerves got the better of him, or simply that he was not present at the time of recording. Other sources insist that it is indeed Miles on this track and attempt to prove it. In his autobiography, Miles says it was Gillespie, and not him, who played on this track:

I remember Bird wanting me to play "Ko-Ko," a tune that was based on the changes of "Cherokee." Now Bird knew I was having trouble playing "Cherokee" back then. So when he said that that was the tune he wanted me to play, I just said no, I wasn't going to do it. That's why Dizzy's playing trumpet on "Ko-Ko," "Warmin' up a Riff," and "Meandering" on Charlie Parker’s Reboppers, because I wasn't going to get out there and embarrass myself.

— Miles Davis, Miles: The Autobiography

Some sources additionally state that a) Gillespie played both trumpet and piano on this track or that b) it is impossible for Gillespie to have played both trumpet and piano on this track. One source states that Hakim played piano on the introduction and the coda, allowing Gillespie to play during Parker's solo. It should be pointed out that there is no piano on the master track of Ko-Ko except during Parker's solo, so this is clearly erroneous, but the piano does begin at the beginning of Parker's solo making it unlikely that the trumpet player would have had time to switch instruments. On the aborted take 1 of Ko-Ko, however, the piano can be heard behind the "Cherokee" melody which both the trumpet and saxophone play. So on take 1, at least, Gillespie cannot have been playing both trumpet and piano. See the various resources for further discussions on this controversy.

In the end, this controversial date has been called "The Greatest Recording Made in Modern Jazz History." "Now's the Time" and "Thriving From a Riff" (also released as "Thriving on a Riff", later known as "Anthropology") are jazz classics. Davis, Gillespie and Roach are revered as jazz giants in their own right.

== Retrospective reception ==
Professional ratings
Review scores
Source	Rating
Penguin Guide to Jazz	👑

The album was awarded a crown in the first five editions of The Penguin Guide to Jazz Recordings.

== Track list ==
All tracks are written by Charlie Parker.

Side A
No.	Title	Length
1.	"Billie's Bounce" (new take #1)	2:20
2.	"Billie's Bounce" (short take #2)	1:20
3.	"Billie's Bounce" (new take #3)	3:05
4.	"Warming up a Riff" (orig. take #1 (Note: Originally released on 78 rpm Savoy 945, previously released on Savoy XP 8001: Charlie Parker, Vol. 2 (7 inch EP), Savoy MG 9000: Charlie Parker, Vol. 1 (10 inch LP) and Savoy MG 12014: The Genius of Charlie Parker (12 inch LP).))	2:30
5.	"Billie's Bounce" (new take #4 (Note: Erroneously listed in the liner notes as "Orig. Take #4", this take was not previously released.))	2:00
6.	"Billie's Bounce" (orig. take #5 (Note: Originally released on 78 rpm Savoy 573, previously released on Savoy XP 8000: Charlie Parker, Vol. 1 (7 inch EP), Savoy MG 9001: Charlie Parker Vol. 2 (10 inch LP) and Savoy MG 12009: Charlie Parker Memorial, Vol. 2 (12 inch LP).))	3:05
7.	"Now's the Time" (short take #1)	0:20
8.	"Now's the Time" (short take #2)	0:37
9.	"Now's the Time" (new take #3)	3:05

Side B
No.	Title	Length
1.	"Now's the Time" (orig. take #4 (Note: Originally released on 78 rpm Savoy 573, previously released on Savoy XP 8000: Charlie Parker, Vol. 1 (7 inch EP), Savoy MG 9000: Charlie Parker, Vol. 1 (10 inch LP) and Savoy MG 12001: The Immortal Charlie Parker (12 inch LP).))	3:15
2.	"Thriving From a Riff" (new take #1)	3:00
3.	"Thriving From a Riff" (short take #2)	0:20
4.	"Thriving From a Riff" (orig. take #3 (Note: Originally released on 78 rpm Savoy 903, previously released on 78 rpm Savoy 945, Savoy XP 8006: Charlie Parker, Vol. 7 (7 inch LP), Savoy MG 9001: Charlie Parker, Vol. 1 (10 inch LP) and Savoy MG 12009: Charlie Parker Memorial, Vol. 2 (12 inch LP). On all previous releases except Savoy 903, the title is listed as "Thriving on a Riff".))	3:00
5.	"Meandering" (only take)	3:15
6.	"Koko" (short take #1)	0:40
7.	"Koko" (orig. take #2 (Note: Originally released on 78 rpm Savoy 597, previously released on 78 rpm Savoy 916, Savoy XP 8001: Charlie Parker, Vol. 2 (7 inch EP), Savoy XP 8097: Bird - Diz - Bud - Max, Vol. 1 (7 inch EP; as "Co-Coa"), Savoy MG 9000: Charlie Parker, Vol. 1 (10 inch LP), Savoy MG 9034: Bird - Diz - Bud - Max (10 inch LP; as "Co-Coa") and Savoy MG 12014: The Genius of Charlie Parker (12 inch LP).))	2:50

== Personnel ==
As noted above, the precise personnel of this album remains unknown. For completeness, listed are the personnel as presented on the label of the album—which is almost certainly incorrect in that it credits Bud Powell on piano—as well as the personnel as listed on Charlie Parker: The Complete Savoy Studio Sessions (the only other complete chronicle of this session), which also may be incorrect.

=== Personnel as listed on The Charlie Parker Story ===
- Charlie Parker – alto saxophone
- Miles Davis – trumpet
- Dizzy Gillespie – piano and trumpet (Note: Gillespie is credited for both trumpet and piano on the label, but the liner notes say: "Dizzy remembers playing both piano and trumpet on the date, but just where and when is not clear.")
- Bud Powell – piano
- Max Roach – drums
- Curley Russell – double bass (Note: Curley Russell's name is omitted from the label, but present in the liner notes.)

=== Personnel as listed on Charlie Parker: The Complete Savoy Studio Sessions ===
- Miles Davis – trumpet
- Charlie Parker – alto saxophone
- Dizzy Gillespie – trumpet ("Koko" only), piano
- Sadik Hakim – piano ("Thriving on a Riff" and "Koko" only)
- Curly Russell – double bass
- Max Roach – drums
