= The Cole Porter Songbook =

Studio album by Charlie Parker
- Released: 1956
- Recorded: March 31, 1954; December 10, 1954
- Genre: Jazz
- Length: 39:33 (Note: Excluding compilation and bonus tracks)
- Label: Verve
- Producer: Norman Granz

Charlie Parker chronology
Now's the Time: the Quartet of Charlie Parker (1956)	The Cole Porter Songbook (1956)	Bird on 52nd St. (1957)

The Cole Porter Songbook, also released as Charlie Parker Plays Cole Porter, is the last recorded studio album by alto saxophonist Charlie Parker. Recorded in New York City in March and December 1954, all the tunes recorded for the sessions featured Parker's renditions of Cole Porter compositions.

== History ==
In 1954, producer Norman Granz suggested to Parker that he record an album of Cole Porter compositions. The result was two studio sessions that year. Both sessions included Walter Bishop Jr. on piano and Teddy Kotick on bass. The first session included guitarist Jerome Darr and drummer Roy Haynes, while the second session included guitarist Billy Bauer and drummer Art Taylor.

The second session is believed to be the last time Parker was recorded before his death in the spring of 1955.

To extend the album to the length needed for an LP record, a compilation of earlier Parker recordings of Porter compositions was attached to the album, drawing from material Parker had played with a variety of bands in 1950, 1952, and 1953. The CD release of the album added a 16-minute take of "What Is This Thing Called Love?" that had been recorded in Los Angeles in 1952.

== Reception ==
Professional ratings
Review scores
Source	Rating
AllMusic	3/5 stars
Jazz Journal	4/5 stars
The Penguin Guide to Jazz	3.5/4 stars

Jazz Journal critic Thomas Fletcher praised the album, writing, "despite his evident focus on technique, Parker was never content with systematic mechanical performance. The personality behind the maths is always present." AllMusic critic Ron Wynn wrote that on the album "Bird takes Porter's songs and extends them to glorious heights."

The authors of The Penguin Guide to Jazz also praised the album, calling it a "lovely record and an ideal purchase for Parker or Porter addicts."

== Track listing ==
All compositions by Cole Porter

1. "I Get a Kick Out of You" (Master Take) — 3:36
2. "I Get a Kick Out of You" (Alternate Take) — 4:53
3. "Just One of Those Things" — 2:43
4. "My Heart Belongs to Daddy" — 3:21
5. "I've Got You Under My Skin" — 3:35
6. "Love for Sale" (Master Take) — 5:36
7. "Love for Sale" (Alternate Take) — 5:32
8. "I Love Paris" (Master Take) — 5:09
9. "I Love Paris" (Alternate Take) — 5:08

=== Compilation tracks ===
- "You'd Be So Easy to Love" — 3:24
- "Begin the Beguine" — 3:10
- "Night and Day" — 2:45
- "What Is This Thing Called Love?" — 2:38
- "In the Still of the Night" — 3:18

=== Bonus track (CD reissue) ===
- "What Is This Thing Called Love?" — 15:51

== Personnel ==
- Charlie Parker — alto saxophone
- Jerome Darr — guitar (tracks 1–5)
- Billy Bauer — guitar (6–9)
- Walter Bishop Jr. — piano
- Teddy Kotick — bass
- Roy Haynes — drums (1–5)
- Art Taylor — drums (6–9)
