= Barbados (composition) =

Jazz tune composed by Charlie Parker

"Barbados" is a jazz tune composed by Charlie Parker. It is a twelve-bar blues set to a mambo rhythm. Parker first recorded it on September 18, 1948, with Miles Davis (trumpet), John Lewis (piano), Curly Russell (bass) and Max Roach (drums).
