= Bird changes =

Type of chord progression

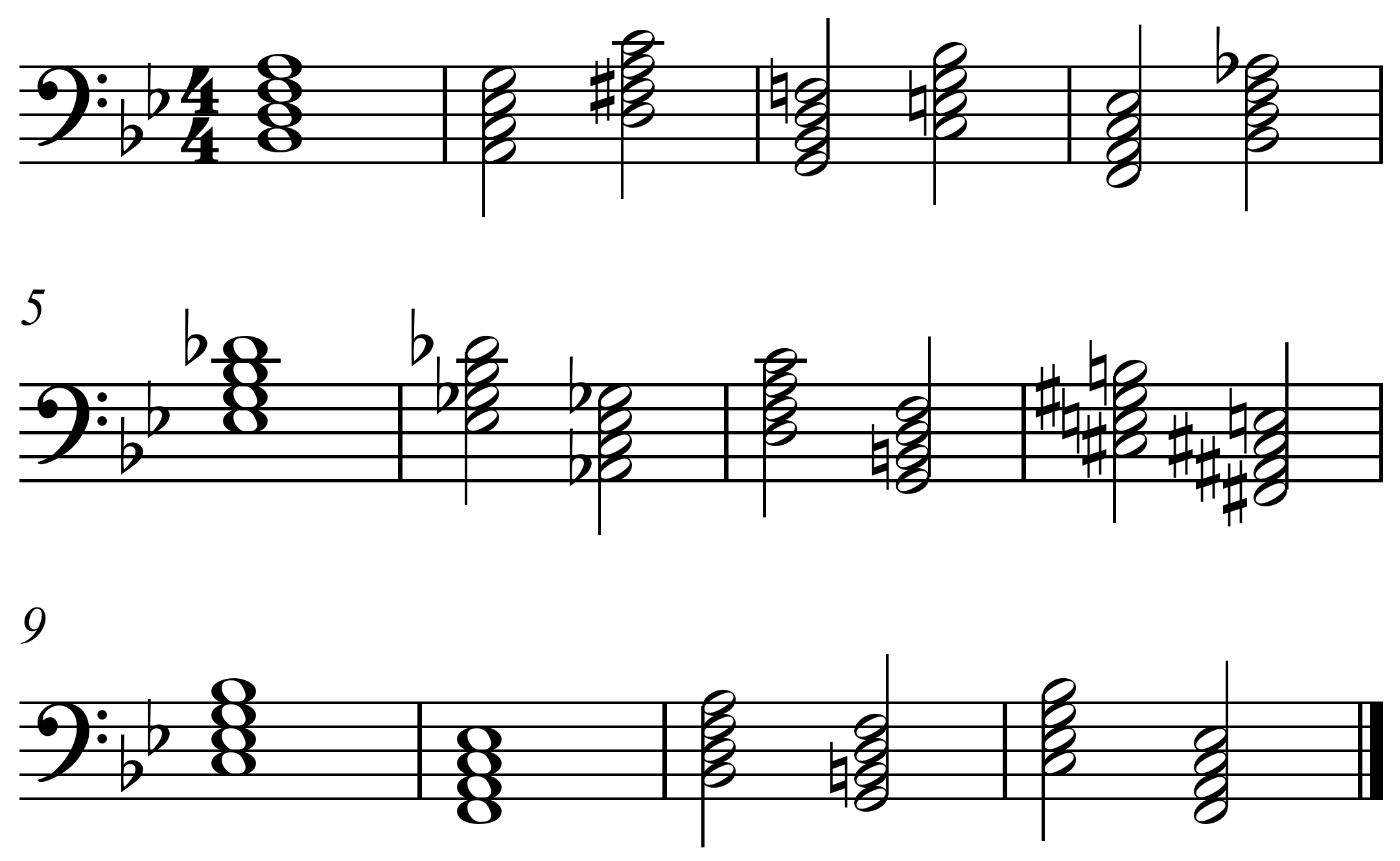
Bird Blues progression

The Blues for Alice changes, Bird changes, Bird Blues, or New York Blues changes is a chord progression, often named after Charlie Parker ("Bird"), which is a variation of the twelve-bar blues.

The progression uses a series of sequential ii–V or secondary ii–V progressions, and has been used in pieces such as Parker's "Blues for Alice". Toots Thielemans's "Bluesette", "Freight Trane" written by pianist Tommy Flanagan, and Parker's "Confirmation" have similar progressions.

== Structure ==
A simple blues progression, in C, is:

A typical blues progression in jazz, in C, is:

The Bird Blues progression, in C, is:

In roman numeral analysis, this is represented by

I^{M7}	vii^{ø}^{7} III^{7}	vi^{7} II^{7}	v^{7} I^{7}
IV^{7}	iv^{7} ♭VII^{7}	iii^{7} VI^{7}	♭iii^{7} ♭VI^{7}
ii^{7}	V^{7}	I^{M7} VI^{7}	ii^{7} V^{7}

This can be viewed as a cycle of ii–V progressions leading to the IV chord (F^{7} in the key of C major), and the tritone substitution of the dominant chords leading by half-step to the V chord (G^{7} in C).

C:	Am:	G(m):	F:
I^{M7}	ii^{ø}^{7} V^{7}	ii^{7} V^{7}	ii^{7} V^{7}
F:	E♭:	D:	D♭(m):
I^{7}	^{sub}ii^{7} ^{sub}V^{7}	^{sub}ii^{7} ^{sub}V^{7}	^{sub}ii^{7} ^{sub}V^{7}
C:
ii^{7}	V^{7}	I^{M7} VI^{7}	ii^{7} V^{7}
