= Now's the Time (composition) =

Song by Charlie Parker
- Length: 3:14
- Composer: Charlie Parker

"Now's the Time" is a composition by Charlie Parker. He led the first recording of it, on November 26, 1945.

== Background and composition ==
"Although Parker was capable of writing intricate bebop melody lines, he sometimes stepped back from his more progressive leanings and drew on his Kansas City jazz roots in crafting simpler, bluesier compositions – of which 'Now's the Time' is a case in point." It is a riff-based blues, with typical bebop phrase endings at the end of bars 5 and 6.

== Original recording ==
"Now's the Time" was first recorded on November 26, 1945, by Charlie Parker's Reboppers: Parker (alto sax), Miles Davis (trumpet), Dizzy Gillespie or Sadik Hakim (piano), Curley Russell (bass), and Max Roach (drums). Multiple takes were made; The Penguin Guide to Jazz suggests that "Parker's solo on the third take is superior in its slashing self-confidence to that on the fourth, which is slightly duller; Miles Davis plays without conviction on both." The fourth take was the original official release.

== Influence ==
The melody of "Now's the Time" was used for "The Hucklebuck", a hit for saxophonist Paul Williams four years after Parker's original recording. Despite being released by the same record label with the same producer, Parker was not credited; instead, the composition was attributed to Andy Gibson, who had been a songwriter for Lucky Millinder, who recorded it as "D-Natural Blues".
