= Constellation (composition) =

1948 jazz composition by Charlie Parker

"Constellation" is a bebop composition written in 1948 by American jazz saxophonist Charlie Parker. It is a contrafact of "I Got Rhythm". "Constellation" was originally recorded by the Charlie Parker All-Stars on September 18, 1948 in New York City for Savoy Records.

The composition has been covered by numerous artists, including notable recordings by Miles Davis and Sonny Stitt.

== See also ==
- List of jazz contrafacts
