= Bloomdido =

1950 jazz composition by Charlie Parker

"Bloomdido" is a jazz standard written by Charlie Parker. It was originally recorded on 6 June 1950 and was released on the Clef Records album Bird and Diz.

== See also ==
- List of jazz standards
