= Blues for Alice =

1951 jazz composition by Charlie Parker

"Blues for Alice" is a 1951 jazz standard, composed by Charlie Parker. The standard is noted for its rapid bebop blues-style chord voicings and complex harmonic scheme which is a fine example of what is known as "Bird Blues". It is written in the key of F major and usually begins with an F major seventh or F sixth chord.

Parker's first recording of the piece is from August 1951 for Verve Records. The lineup consisted of Parker, Red Rodney (trumpet), John Lewis (piano), Ray Brown (bass) and Kenny Clarke (drums).

== Structure ==
The composition is a modified twelve-bar blues in F major with heavy use of the ii-V-I progression.

== See also ==
- List of post-1950 jazz standards
