= One Night in Birdland =

Live album by Charlie Parker
- Released: 1977
- Recorded: May 15–16, 1950
- Venue: Birdland
- Genre: Jazz
- Label: Columbia

Charlie Parker chronology
Bird Is Free (1961)	One Night in Birdland (1977)	Summit Meeting at Birdland (1977)

Fats Navarro chronology
The Fabulous Fats Navarro, Vol. 2 (1957)	One Night in Birdland (1977)

Bud Powell chronology
Bud in Paris (1975)	One Night in Birdland (1977)	At the Golden Circle (1978)

One Night in Birdland is a live album by American jazz saxophonist Charlie Parker recorded at Birdland on May 15–16, 1950. Recorded in low audio quality on a private tape, it was released as an LP by Columbia Records. Parker's quintet features trumpeter Fats Navarro, and rhythm section Bud Powell, Curley Russell, and Art Blakey.

== Critical reception ==
Critic Scott Yanow noted, "the recording quality is not state of the art but the music on this two-LP set is often quite brilliant." He praised the "inspired" "all-star lineup" of the quintet.

In The Penguin Guide to Jazz, Richard Cook praised the album and awarded it four out of four stars, calling it a "marvelous moment" and praised Navarro in particular, claiming "There are moments on this when Parker is very nearly eclipsed by Fats Navarro."

The album received a five out of five rating from John Swenson of The Rolling Stone Jazz Record Guide.

John McDonough of DownBeat praised the album, noting, "Navarro and Parker are not merely throwing lines back and forth. They are finishing each other's ideas. Aside from Parker himself, the most impressive aspect of the music is Bud Powell. He was bop's most complete pianist, and here he is at the top of his form."

Professional ratings
Review scores
Source	Rating
Allmusic	4/5 stars
DownBeat	4/5 stars
The Penguin Guide to Jazz	4/4 stars
The Rolling Stone Jazz Record Guide	5/5 stars

== Track listing ==
All compositions by Charlie Parker unless otherwise stated

1. "Wahoo" (Benny Harris) – 6:34
2. "'Round Midnight" (Thelonious Monk) – 5:07
3. "This Time the Dream's on Me" (Harold Arlen, Johnny Mercer) – 6:13
4. "Dizzy Atmosphere" (Dizzy Gillespie) – 6:52
5. "A Night in Tunisia" (Gillespie) – 5:38
6. "Move" (Denzil Best) – 6:30
7. "Street Beat" (Navarro) – 9:27
8. "Out of Nowhere" (Johnny Green) – 6:20
9. "Little Willie Leaps" (Miles Davis) / "52nd Street Theme" (Monk) – 5:44
10. "Ornithology" (Parker, Harris) – 7:50
11. "I'll Remember April" (Gene de Paul, Don Raye) / "52nd Street Theme" (Monk) – 9:23
12. "Embraceable You" (George Gershwin, Ira Gershwin) – 6:20
13. "Cool Blues" / "52nd Street Theme" (Monk) – 9:09

== Personnel ==
- Charlie Parker – alto saxophone
- Fats Navarro – trumpet
- Jimmy Scott (track 12) – vocals
- Bud Powell (1-12) – piano
- Walter Bishop Jr. (13) – piano
- Curley Russell – bass
- Art Blakey (1-12) – drums
- Roy Haynes (13) – drums
