= Anthropology (composition) =

Jazz composition by Charlie Parker and Dizzy Gillespie

"Anthropology" (also known as "Thriving from a Riff" or "Thriving on a Riff") is a bebop-style jazz composition that is credited to Charlie Parker and Dizzy Gillespie. Parker stated in 1949 that Gillespie had played no part in its writing, and that others had added the trumpeter as co-composer.

It is a contrafact, being based on the harmony of "I Got Rhythm". The first recording of the composition, then known as "Thriving from a Riff", was made on November 26, 1945, by an ensemble led by Parker. The other musicians were trumpeter Miles Davis, pianist Sadik Hakim, bassist Curley Russell, vibraphonist Milt Jackson, and drummer Max Roach.

== See also ==
- List of jazz contrafacts
- List of 1940s jazz standards
- Charlie Parker's Savoy and Dial Sessions
