= Sadik Hakim =

American jazz pianist and composer (1919–1983)

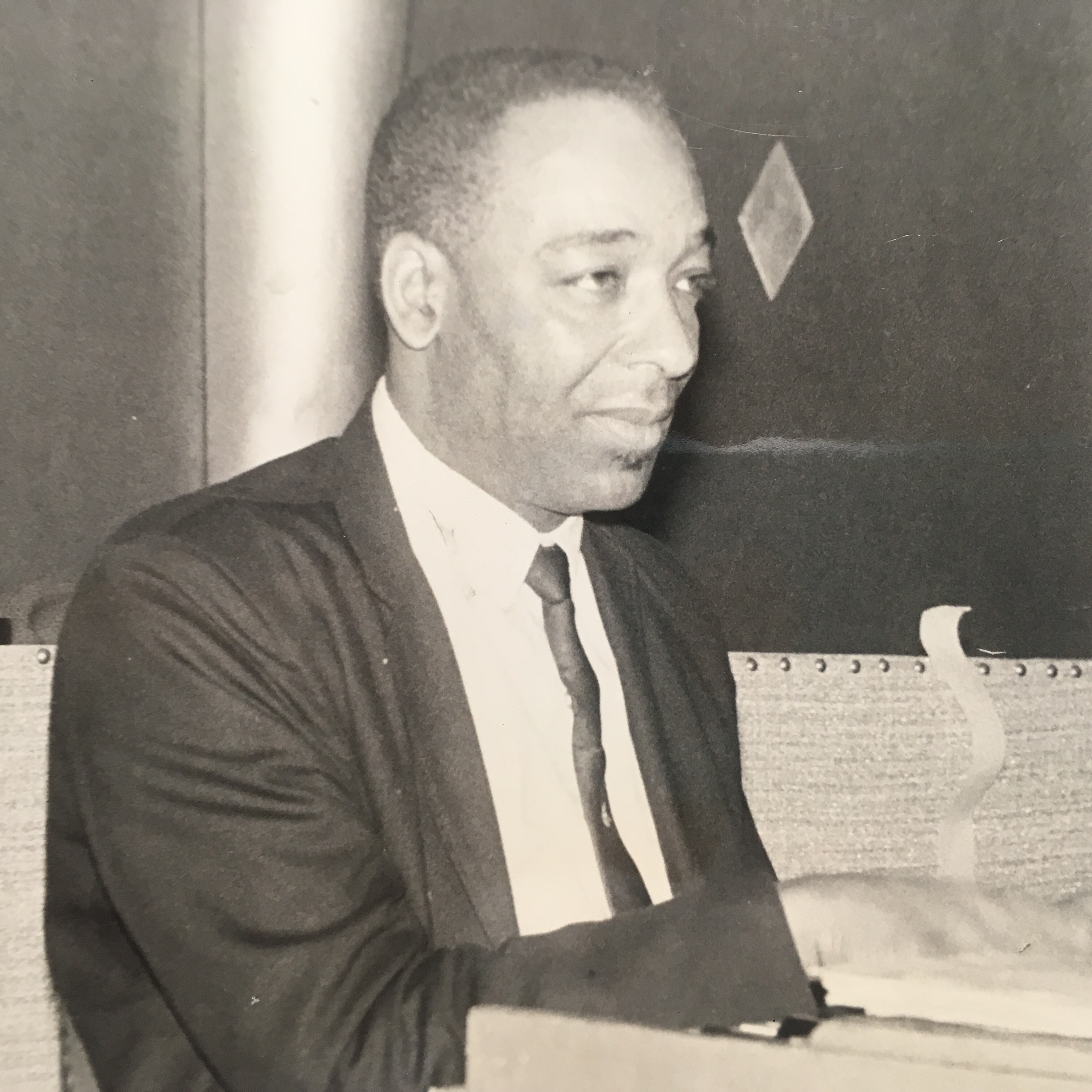
- Sadik Hakim circa 1965

Background information
- Born: Argonne Forrest Thornton; July 15, 1919; Duluth, Minnesota, U.S.
- Died: June 20, 1983 (aged 63) New York City, U.S.
- Genres: Jazz, bebop
- Occupation: Musician
- Instrument: Piano
- Years active: 1940s–1980s

Sadik Hakim (born Argonne Forrest Thornton; July 15, 1919 – June 20, 1983) was an American jazz pianist and composer.

== Early life ==
Argonne Forrest Thornton was born on July 15, 1919, in Duluth, Minnesota to Luther and Maceola Williams Thornton. The name Argonne came from the World War I battle. He was taught music by his grandfather and played locally before moving to Chicago.

== Later life and career ==
In Chicago in 1944, Hakim was heard by the tenor saxophonist Ben Webster, who took him to New York to be the pianist in his band. He appeared on some Charlie Parker recordings for Savoy Records in the following year. He toured with another saxophonist, Lester Young from 1946 to 1948, including for recordings. He changed his name to Sadik Hakim, a Muslim formulation, in 1947.

"In the 1950s Hakim played in Canada with Louis Metcalf, toured with James Moody (1951–4), and was a member of Buddy Tate's orchestra (1956–60)." Hakim's debut recording as a leader was in 1962, on an album for Charlie Parker Records that was shared with Duke Jordan. "Around 1966 he moved to Montreal, where he played in nightclubs. He toured Europe for a year, played in a trio at a festival in Duluth (1976), and then returned to New York; he toured Japan in 1979–80."

Hakim returned to recording as a leader in 1973, laying down material that was released by CBC, Progressive, SteepleChase, and Storyville Records. Hakim claimed that he wrote "Eronel", which is usually thought of as a Thelonious Monk composition.

Hakim died in New York City on June 20, 1983. He has a daughter, Louize Hakim, who is an apparel designer in Hawaii.

== Playing style ==
Scott Yanow wrote that Hakim "had a particularly unusual boppish style in the '40s, playing dissonant lines, using repetition to build suspense, and certainly standing out from the many Bud Powell impressionists. Later in his career his playing became more conventional." The Penguin Guide to Jazz compared him with Powell, and wrote that Hakim did not have a characteristic playing style.

== Discography ==
=== As leader ===
| Year recorded | Title | Label | Personnel/Notes |
|---|---|---|---|
| 1962? | East and West of Jazz | Charlie Parker | Album shared with Duke Jordan |
| 1973 | London Suite (aka Transcription, Canada, Sadik Hakim) | Radio Canada International | with Sayyd Abdul Al-Khabyyr (alto sax), Billy Robinson (tenor sax), Peter Leitch (guitar), Vic Angelillo (bass), Keith 'Spike' McKendry (drums) |
| 1974 | Sadik Hakim Plays Duke Ellington (aka The Canadian Concert of Sadik Hakim) | Radio Canada International | with Brian Lydall (trumpet), Dale Hillary (alto sax), Michael Stewart (tenor sax), Bob Boucher (bass), Clayton Johnson (drums) |
| 1977 | Witches, Goblins, Etc. | SteepleChase | Trio, with Erroll Walters (bass), Al Foster (drums) |
| 1978? | Sonny Stitt Meets Sadik Hakim | | Co-led with Sonny Stitt (tenor sax, alto sax); quartet, with Buster Williams (bass), J.R. Mitchell (drums) |
| 1978? | Memories | Progressive | Solo piano |
| 1980 | Lazy Bird | Storyville | Trio, with Erroll Walters (bass), Clifford Barbaro (drums) |

Main sources:

=== As sideman ===
With James Moody

- Moody (Prestige, 1954)

With Buddy Tate

- Tate's Date (Swingville, 1960)
