= Charlie Parker =

American jazz saxophonist (1920–1955)

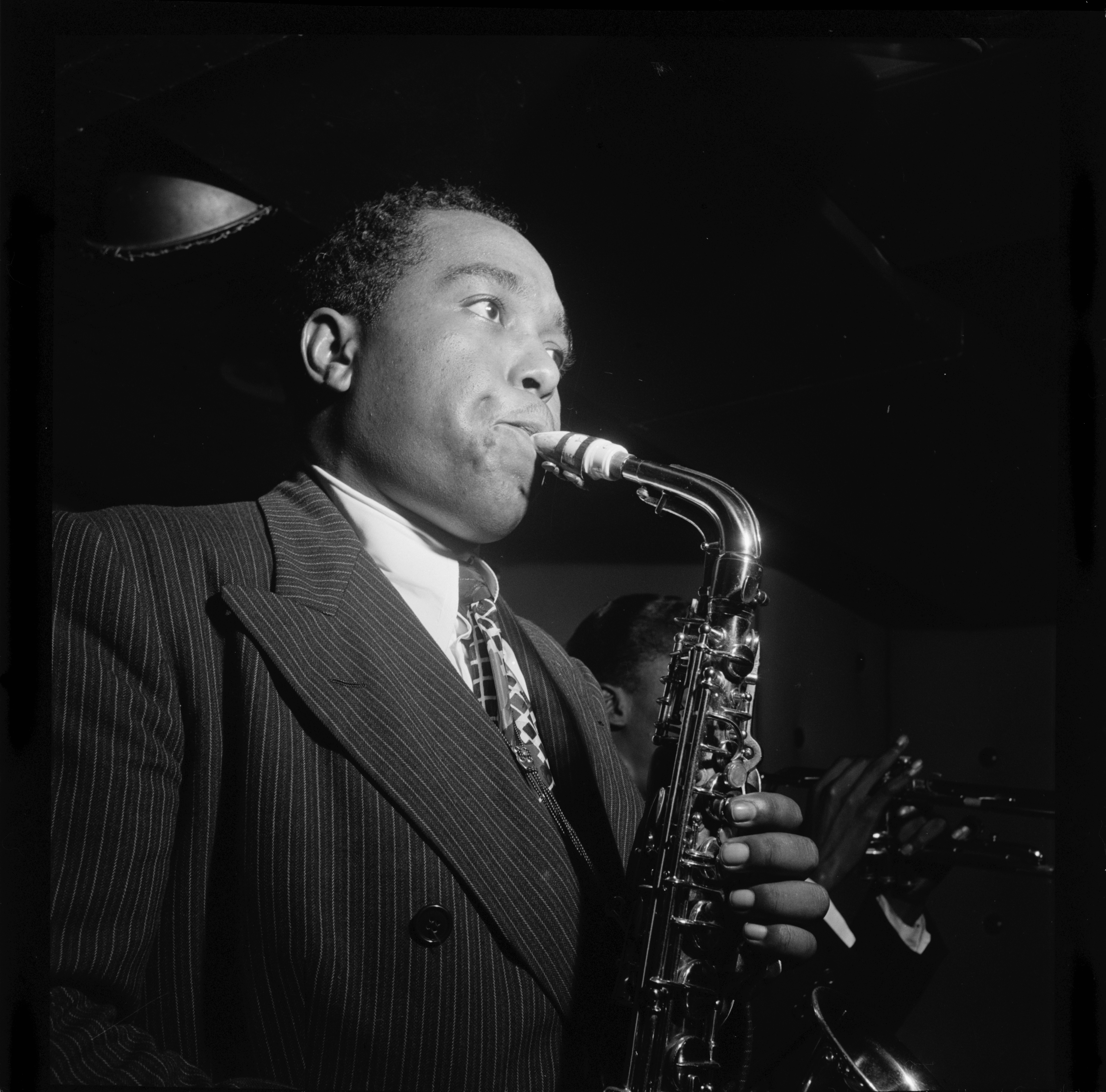
- Parker at the Three Deuces jazz club, New York City, 1947

Background information
- Also known as: Bird, Yardbird
- Born: Charles Parker Jr. August 29, 1920; Kansas City, Kansas, U.S.
- Died: March 12, 1955 (aged 34) New York City, U.S.
- Genres: Jazz; bebop
- Occupations: Musician; composer
- Instruments: Alto saxophone; tenor saxophone
- Works: Charlie Parker discography
- Years active: 1937–1955
- Labels: Savoy; Dial; Verve; Mercury; Esquire; Vogue; EMI Columbia
- Spouses: Rebecca Ruffin (m. 1936; div. 1939) Doris June Sydnor (m. 1948; div. 1955)
- Partner: Chan Berg (1950–1955)
- Website: charlieparkermusic.com

Charles Parker Jr. (August 29, 1920 – March 12, 1955), nicknamed "Yardbird," or "Bird" for short, was an American jazz saxophonist, bandleader, and composer. Parker was a highly influential soloist and leading figure in the development of bebop, a form of jazz characterized by fast tempos, virtuosic technique, and advanced harmonies. He was a virtuoso and introduced revolutionary rhythmic and harmonic ideas into jazz, including rapid passing chords, new variants of altered chords, and chord substitutions. Parker primarily played the alto saxophone.

Parker was an icon for the hipster subculture and later the Beat Generation, personifying the jazz musician as an uncompromising artist and intellectual rather than just an entertainer.

== Early life ==
Charles Parker Jr. was born on August 29, 1920, in Kansas City, Kansas, to Charles Parker Sr. and Adelaide "Addie" Bailey, who was of mixed Choctaw and African-American background. He was raised in Kansas City, Missouri, near Westport Road. His father, a Pullman waiter and chef on the railways, was often required to travel for work, but provided some musical influence because he was a pianist, dancer, and singer on the Theatre Owners Booking Association circuit. Parker's mother worked nights at the local Western Union office during the 1920s.

Parker first went to a Catholic school and sang in its choir, but his parents separated in 1930 because of his father's alcoholism and the effects of the Great Depression. By the time he was in high school, Parker, his older half-brother John, and his mother Addie were living near 15th Street and Olive Street and she was working as a cleaner in order to afford housing.

Parker began playing the saxophone at age 11, and at age 14, he joined the Lincoln High School band, where he studied under bandmaster Alonzo Lewis. His mother purchased him a new alto saxophone around the same time. Parker's biggest influence in his early teens was a young trombone player named Robert Simpson, who taught him the basics of improvisation.

Parker withdrew from high school in December 1935, joined the local musicians' union, and decided to pursue his musical career full-time.

== Career ==
=== 1936–1938: Jam sessions and woodshedding ===
Upon leaving high school, Parker began to play with local bands in jazz clubs around Kansas City and often ambitiously took part in jam sessions with more experienced musicians. In early 1936, at one such jam session with the Count Basie Orchestra, he lost track of the chord changes while improvising. This prompted Jo Jones to contemptuously remove a cymbal from his drum kit and throw it at his feet as a signal to leave the stage.

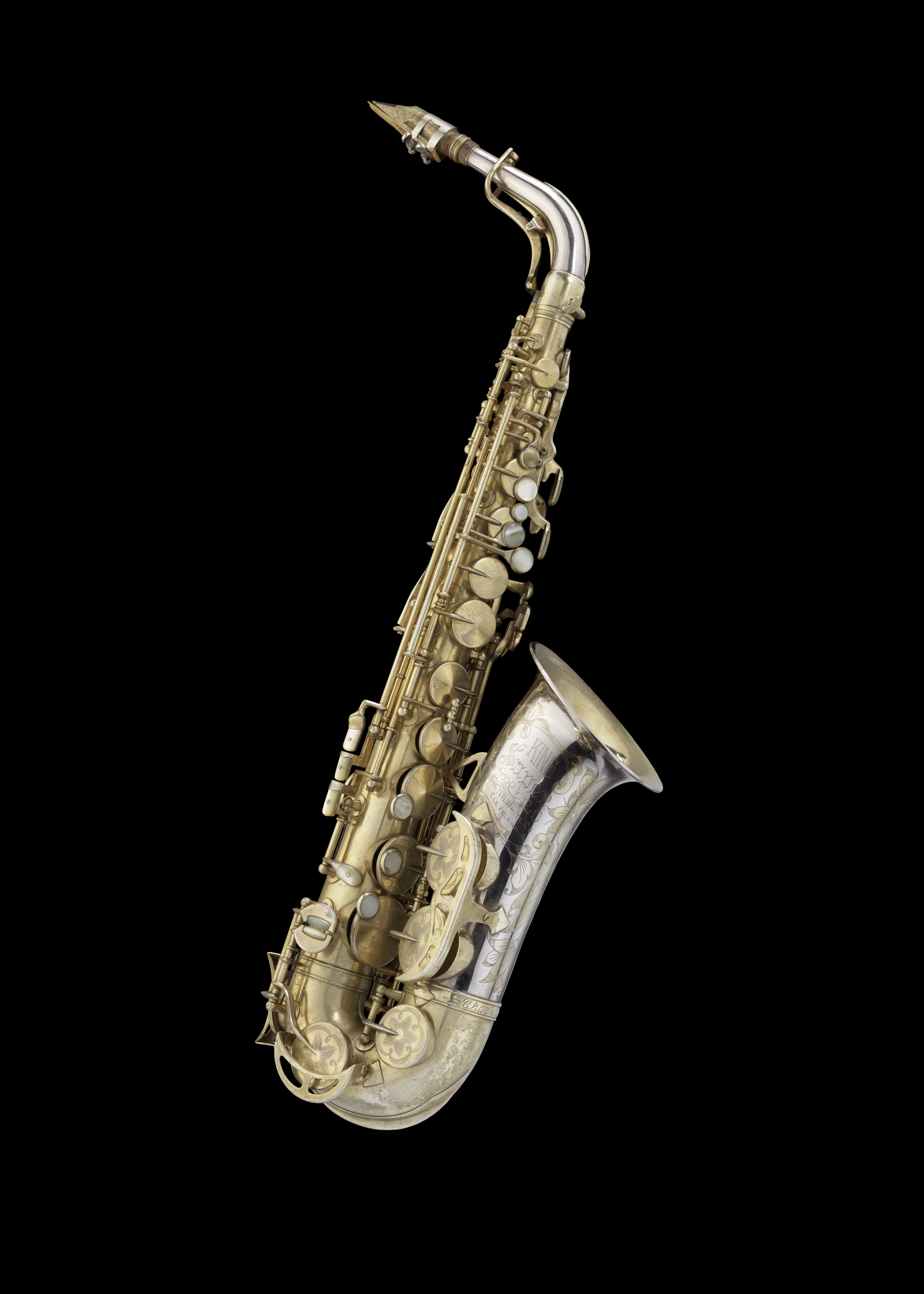
A King Super 20 alto saxophone, owned and played by Parker, now at the Smithsonian Institution

Rather than becoming discouraged, Parker vowed to practice harder. He mastered improvisation and, according to his comments in an interview with Paul Desmond, spent the next three to four years practicing up to 15 hours a day. Parker proposed to Rebecca Ruffin, his girlfriend four years older than him, and the two married on July 25, 1936. They had two children before divorcing in 1939, in large part in response to his growing drug addiction.

In late 1936, Parker and a Kansas City band traveled to the Ozarks for the opening of Musser's Resort south of Eldon, Missouri. Along the way, the caravan of musicians had a car accident and Parker broke three ribs and fractured his spine. Despite this near-death experience, in 1937, Parker returned to the area, where he spent a great deal of time woodshedding and developing his sound. Working with a pianist and guitarist, he practiced improvising over chord changes and began to develop the ability to solo fluently across chords and scales.

In 1938, Parker joined pianist Jay McShann's territory band. His first gig with the band was during the summer or early fall at the Continental Club in Kansas City, where Parker worked as a substitute alto saxophonist for Edward "Popeye" Hale. In December, he joined Harlan Leonard's Rockets; the band played at dances including a Christmas dance for which Parker was listed in a local newspaper as one of the Rockets' personnel.

=== 1939–1944: Development of bebop ===
In 1939, Parker moved to New York City to pursue his musical career but worked part-time jobs to make a living. Among the more musically significant of these was as a dishwasher, for nine dollars a week, at Jimmie's Chicken Shack, where pianist Art Tatum performed. Struggling with poverty, Parker went to the home of fellow alto saxophone player Buster Smith to ask for help. Smith allowed Parker to live in his apartment for six months and gave him gigs in his band. Parker's playing at the gigs impressed several New York musicians, including pianist and bandleader Earl Hines.

While living in New York, Parker achieved his musical breakthrough, developing a new improvisational vocabulary which later came to be known as "bebop". Playing "Cherokee" in a practice session with guitarist William "Biddy" Fleet, he realized that the 12 semitones of the chromatic scale can lead melodically to any key, breaking some of the confines of simpler jazz soloing. Parker recalled, "I'd been getting bored with the stereotyped changes that were being used all the time at the time, and I kept thinking there's bound to be something else. I could hear it sometimes but I couldn't play it ... Well, that night I was working over 'Cherokee' and, as I did, I found that by using the higher intervals of a chord as a melody line and backing them with appropriately related changes, I could play the thing I'd been hearing. I came alive."

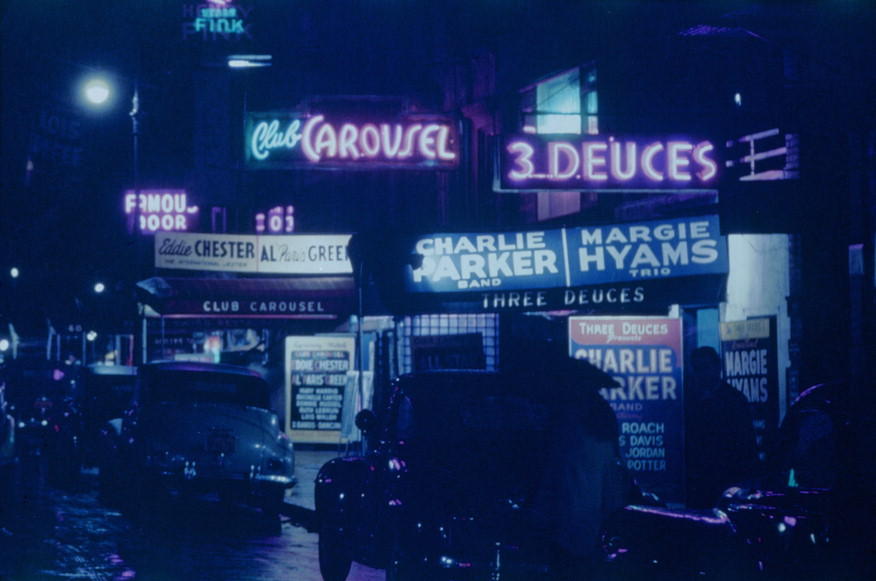
Marquee signage advertising the names of Parker and Margie Hyams at the Three Deuces, New York City, c. 1948

In 1940, he returned to Kansas City to perform with Jay McShann and to attend the funeral of his father, Charles Sr. The younger Parker then spent the summer in McShann's band playing at Fairyland Park for all-white audiences; trumpet player Bernard Anderson introduced him to Dizzy Gillespie. The band also toured nightclubs and other venues of the southwest, as well as Chicago and New York City, and Parker made his professional recording debut with McShann's band that year. When in New York, to experiment with his new musical ideas that went beyond the bounds of McShann's group, Parker joined a group of young musicians who played in after-hours clubs in Harlem venues, including Clark Monroe's Uptown House. Fellow musicians at the venues included developing beboppers Gillespie, pianist Thelonious Monk, guitarist Charlie Christian, and drummer Kenny Clarke. A pianist and one of the pioneers of bebop, Mary Lou Williams, said the after-hours sessions were an opportunity "to challenge the practice of downtown musicians coming uptown and 'stealing' the music".

Parker left McShann's band in 1942 and played for one year with Hines, whose band also included Gillespie. This band's performances, and therefore Parker's role in them, are virtually undocumented due to the strike of 1942–1944 by the American Federation of Musicians, during which time few professional recordings were made. In fact, much of bebop's critical early development was not captured for posterity due to the ban, and the new genre gained limited radio exposure as a result. The few recordings in which Parker participated in 1943 took place in Chicago and included a jam session recording with Gillespie and bassist Oscar Pettiford, another session with Billy Eckstine playing trumpet, some informally recorded practice sessions, and a duo with pianist Hazel Scott. Parker's time with Hines's band and his travel between New York and Chicago enabled him to model his style on, according to his own words, a "combination of the Midwestern beat and the fast New York tempos". Parker began writing compositions thanks to his growing friendship with Gillespie, who began notating Parker's solos as melodies. Among these early Parker compositions were "Ko-Ko", "Anthropology", and "Confirmation".

Parker left Hines's band and formed a small group with Gillespie, pianist Al Haig, bassist Curley Russell, and drummer Stan Levey. The group stood out from its contemporaries, as it was racially integrated and lacked a guitarist for rhythmic support. This new format freed soloists from harmonic and rhythmic restrictions, and in late 1944, the group secured a gig at the Three Deuces club in New York. The group's name recognition spread along 52nd Street, and its style was dubbed "bebop" for the first time. Musicians at other clubs came to hear bebop and reacted unfavorably to it because, according to Charles Mingus, they saw it as a threat to their style of jazz.

=== 1945–1953: Solo career ===
Only in 1945, after the AFM's recording ban was lifted, did Parker's collaborations with Dizzy Gillespie, Max Roach, and others have a substantial effect on the jazz world. One of their first small-group performances together, a concert in New York's Town Hall on June 22, 1945, was rediscovered in 2004 and released in 2005. Bebop soon gained wider appeal among musicians and fans.

On November 26, 1945, Parker led a record date for Savoy Records, marketed as the "greatest Jazz session ever". Recording as Charlie Parker's Reboppers, Parker enlisted sidemen Gillespie and Miles Davis on trumpet, Curley Russell on bass, and Max Roach on drums. The tracks recorded during this session include "Ko-Ko", "Billie's Bounce", and "Now's the Time".

In December 1945, the Parker band traveled to an unsuccessful engagement at the Billy Berg's club in Los Angeles. Most of the group returned to New York, but Parker remained in California, cashing in his return ticket to buy heroin. After he dedicated one of his compositions to local drug dealer "Moose the Mooche" at a studio session in the spring, the dealer was arrested, and without access to heroin, Parker turned to alcohol addiction. He suffered a physical and mental breakdown after a studio session in July 1946 for Dial Records, and was briefly jailed after setting the bedsheets of his Los Angeles hotel room on fire and then running naked through the lobby while intoxicated, after which he was committed to the Camarillo State Mental Hospital for six months.

When Parker was discharged from the hospital, he was healthy and free from his drug habit. Before leaving California, he recorded "Relaxin' at Camarillo", in reference to his stay in the mental hospital, at one of two successful recording sessions. The first took place with a septet while the other paired Parker with pianist Erroll Garner's trio and vocalist Earl Coleman. Upon returning to New York in 1947, Parker resumed his heroin usage. He recorded dozens of sides for the Savoy and Dial labels, which remain some of the high points of his recorded output. Many of these were with his new quintet, including Davis and Roach. Parker and Davis disagreed on who should be the quintet's pianist, with Parker originally hiring Bud Powell for a May 1947 recording session but later favoring Gillespie's arranger, John Lewis; Davis preferred Duke Jordan. Ultimately, the quintet used both, as Parker wanted to balance leadership of the group with mentoring younger musicians such as Davis.

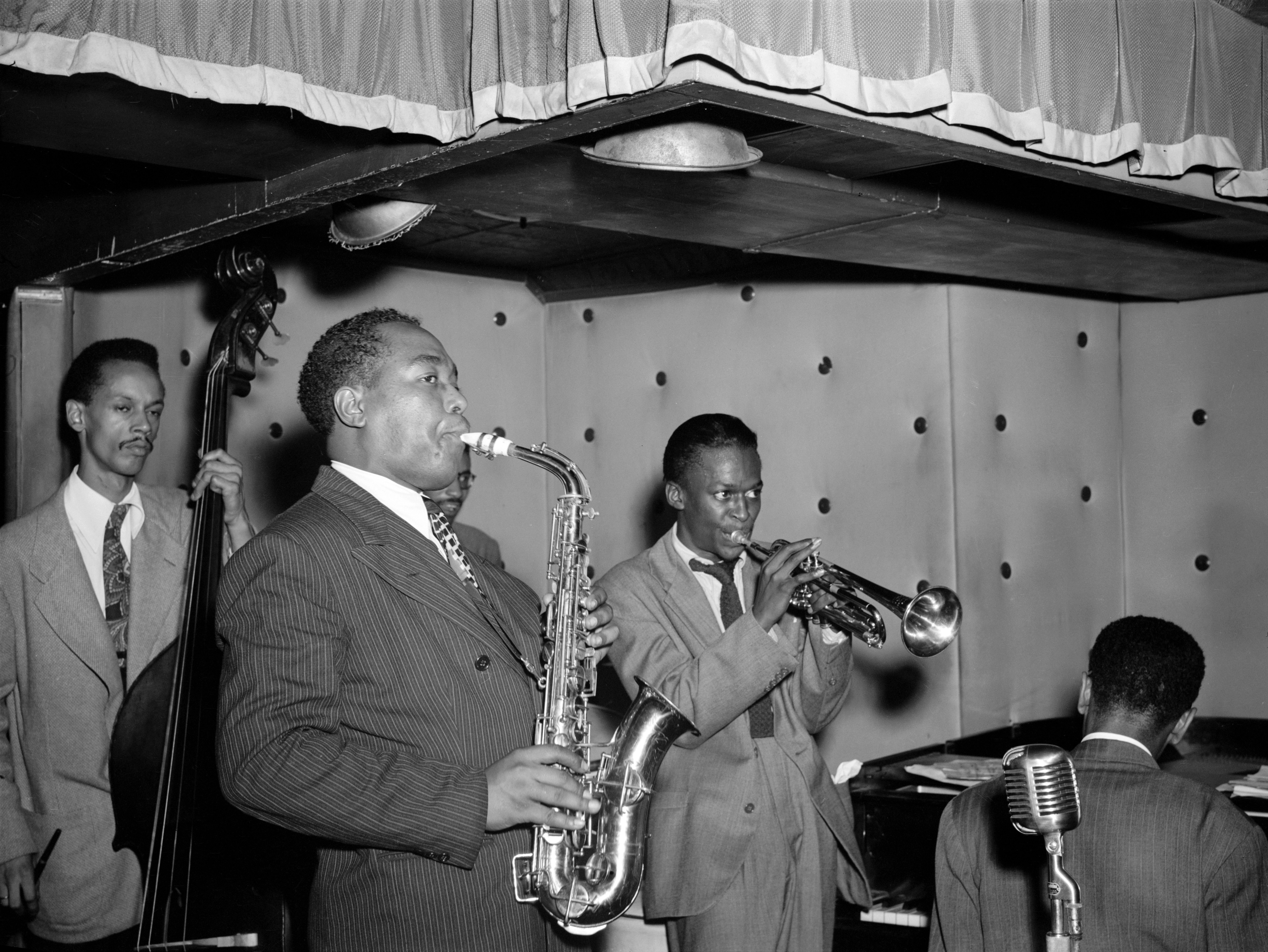
Parker with (from left to right) Tommy Potter, Max Roach, Miles Davis, and Duke Jordan, at the Three Deuces, New York City, August 1947

Following the establishment of a regular quintet, Parker signed for Mercury Records with Jazz at the Philharmonic promoter Norman Granz as his producer. The partnership enabled Parker to work with musicians from other genres, such as Latin jazz percussionist and bandleader Machito, and to appear in concerts at Carnegie Hall as part of the Jazz at the Philharmonic series. Further, Granz was able to fulfil a longstanding desire of Parker's to perform with a string section. He was a keen student of classical music, and contemporaries reported he was most interested in the music and formal innovations of Igor Stravinsky and longed to engage in a project akin to what later became known as third stream, a new kind of music, incorporating both jazz and classical elements as opposed to merely incorporating a string section into performance of jazz standards. On November 30, 1949, Granz arranged for Parker to record an album of ballads with a mixed group of jazz and chamber orchestra musicians. Six master takes from this session became the album Charlie Parker with Strings: "Just Friends", "Everything Happens to Me", "April in Paris", "Summertime", "I Didn't Know What Time It Was", and "If I Should Lose You".

In 1950, Parker and Gillespie recorded Bird and Diz, an album that proved to be among the few times Parker worked with bebop pianist Thelonious Monk; the music was released in 1952. Meanwhile, Parker's regular group maintained popular success with a European tour in 1950, and live gigs at New York nightclubs continued, leading to live albums One Night in Birdland (with Fats Navarro and Powell) and Summit Meeting at Birdland (with Gillespie and Powell). But Parker became frustrated and disillusioned that, due to racial discrimination, he was reaching the limits of what he could achieve in his career.

In 1953, Parker performed at Massey Hall in Toronto, joined by Gillespie, Mingus, Powell, and Roach. The concert happened at the same time as a televised heavyweight boxing match between Rocky Marciano and Jersey Joe Walcott, so it was poorly attended. Mingus recorded the concert, which resulted in the album Jazz at Massey Hall. At the concert, Parker played a plastic Grafton saxophone.

Other live, and often bootleg, recordings of Parker were made in the early 1950s, frequently with groups other than his usual quintet. Among the most notable of these, particularly according to critics, are Charlie Parker in Sweden (recorded during his 1950 Sweden tour), Bird at St. Nick's (with Red Rodney), Inglewood Jam (recorded in 1952 with Chet Baker), Live at Rockland Palace (recorded live with his quintet and string accompaniment), Charlie Parker at Storyville (with Herb Pomeroy and Red Garland), and The Washington Concerts (recorded unrehearsed in 1953 with a big band).

=== 1954–1955: Illness and death ===
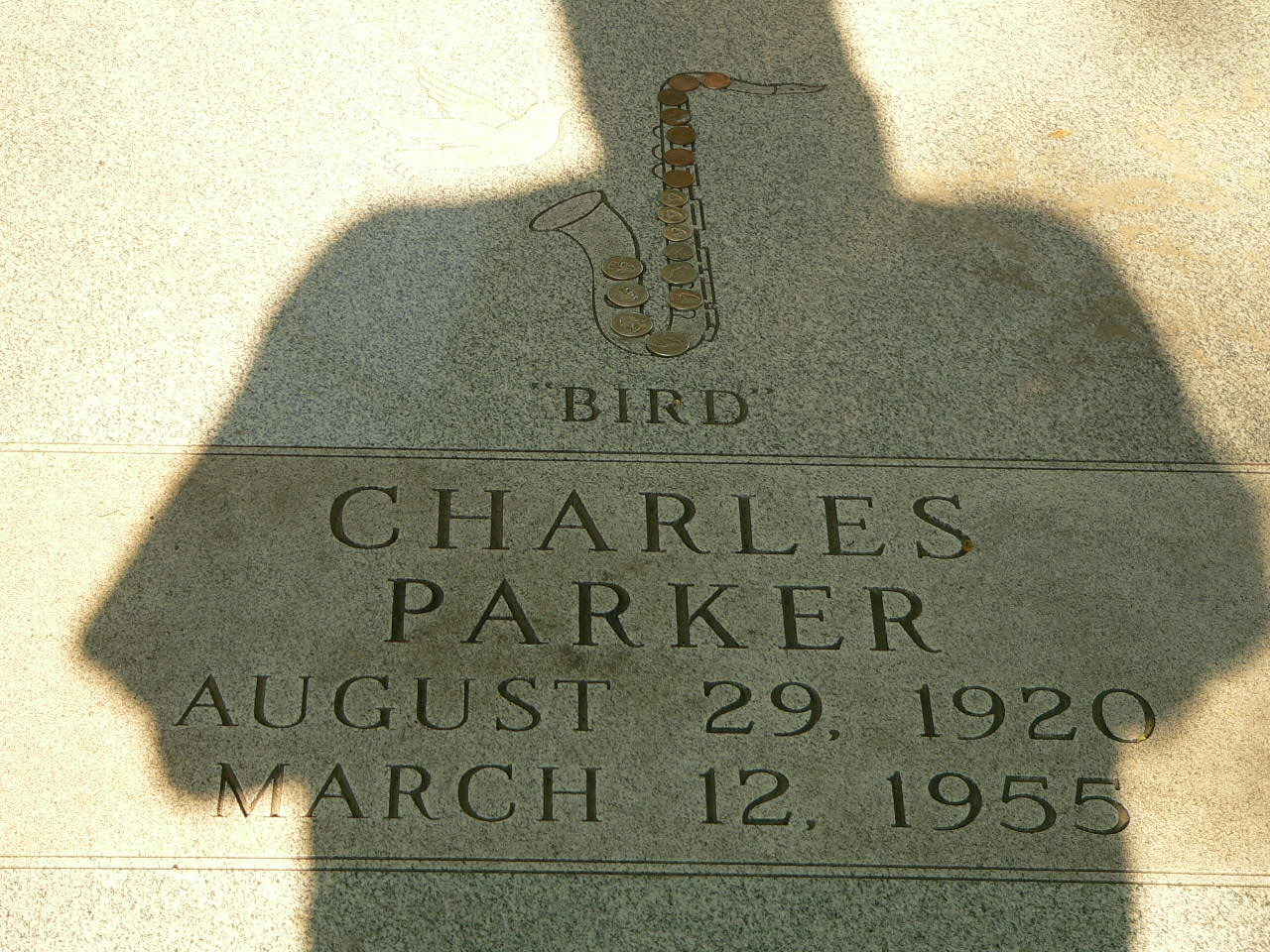
Parker's grave at Lincoln Cemetery, Kansas City, Missouri, in 2005

Since 1950, Parker had been living in New York City with his common-law wife, Chan Berg, the mother of his son, Baird (1952–2014), and his daughter, Pree (who died at age 2). He considered Chan his wife, although he never married her; nor did he divorce his previous wife, Doris, whom he had married in 1948.

The death of Parker's daughter Pree from pneumonia in 1954 devastated him and, after being fired from Birdland in September of that year, he attempted to commit suicide. He was hospitalized and made a partial recovery by early 1955 before his health declined again in March. Parker's last gig on March 4 at Birdland ended when Powell refused to play in his group, and the performance spiraled into an argument among the musicians. Parker became drunk and, a few days later, visited the suite of Baroness Pannonica at the Stanhope Hotel in New York City in ill health. He refused to go to the hospital and died on March 12, 1955, while watching the Dorsey Brothers' Stage Show on television. The official causes of death were lobar pneumonia and a bleeding ulcer, but Parker also had advanced cirrhosis and had suffered a heart attack and a seizure. The coroner who performed his autopsy mistakenly estimated Parker's 34-year-old body to be between 50 and 60 years of age.

The details surrounding Parker's death were controversial. Doris Parker claimed that she, Parker's mother, and Art Blakey were aware of Parker's death before March 14, when Pannonica claimed she first revealed the news on a phone call to Chan. Pannonica, however, visited a nightclub on March 13, the day after Parker died at her apartment but before she informed Chan of Parker's death. Further, newspapers incorrectly reported Parker's age as 53 when he died, and Parker's tombstone incorrectly claimed that he died on March 23.

Parker's marital status complicated the settling of Parker's estate and ultimately frustrated his wish to be interred in New York City. Dizzy Gillespie paid for the funeral arrangements, which included a Harlem procession officiated by Congressman and Reverend Adam Clayton Powell Jr. at the Abyssinian Baptist Church and a memorial concert. Parker's body was flown back to Missouri, in accordance with his mother's wishes. Chan criticized Doris and Parker's family for giving him a Christian funeral even though they knew he was an atheist. Parker was buried at Lincoln Cemetery in Missouri, in a hamlet known as Blue Summit, located close to I-435 and East Truman Road.

Some amount of controversy continued after Parker's burial in the Kansas City area. His tomb was engraved with the image of a tenor saxophone, though Parker is primarily associated with the alto saxophone. Later, some people wanted to move Parker's remains to reinforce redevelopment of the historic 18th and Vine area.

== Personal life ==
Parker acquired the nickname "Yardbird" early in his career while on the road with Jay McShann. This, and the shortened form "Bird", were used as nicknames for Parker for the rest of his life and inspired the titles of a number of Parker's compositions, such as "Yardbird Suite", "Ornithology", "Bird Gets the Worm", and "Bird of Paradise".

Parker's life was riddled with mental health problems and an addiction to heroin. Although it is unclear which came first, his addiction to opiates began at the age of 16, when he was injured in a car crash and a doctor prescribed morphine for the pain. The addiction that stemmed from this incident led him to miss performances, and he was considered to be unreliable. In the jazz scene, heroin use was prevalent and the substance could be acquired with little difficulty.

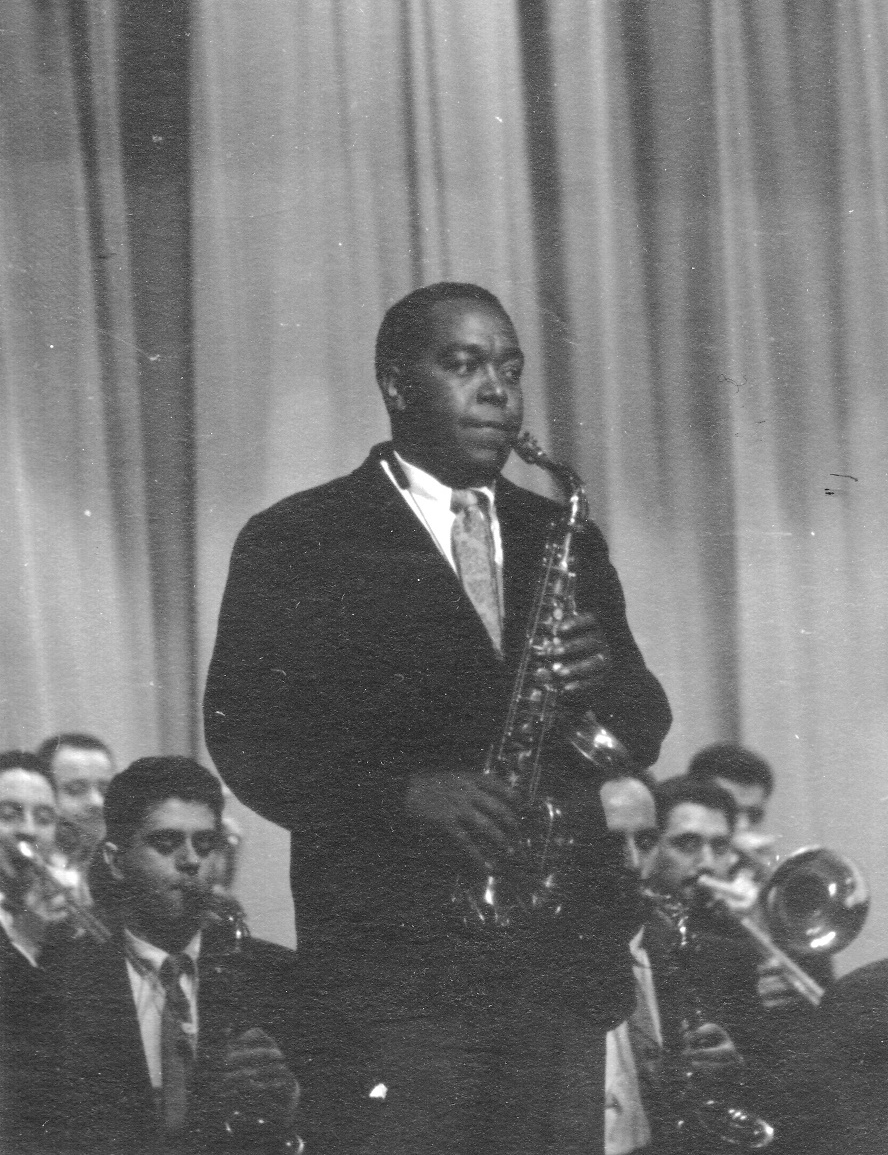
Parker performing in 1954

Although he produced many brilliant recordings during this period, Parker's behavior became increasingly erratic. Heroin was difficult to obtain once he moved to California, where the drug was less abundant, so he used alcohol as a substitute. A recording for the Dial label from July 29, 1946, provides evidence of his condition. Before this session, Parker drank a quart of whisky. According to the liner notes of Charlie Parker on Dial Volume 1, Parker missed most of the first two bars of his first chorus on the track "Max Making Wax". When he finally did come in, he swayed wildly and once spun all the way around, away from his microphone. On the next tune, "Lover Man", producer Ross Russell physically supported Parker. On "Bebop" (the final track Parker recorded that evening), he begins a solo with a solid first eight bars; on his second eight bars, however, he begins to struggle, and a desperate Howard McGhee, the trumpeter on this session, shouts, "Blow!" at him. Charles Mingus, however, considered this version of "Lover Man" to be among Parker's greatest recordings, despite its flaws. Nevertheless, Parker hated the recording and never forgave Ross Russell for releasing it. He re-recorded the tune in 1951 for Verve.

Parker's life took a turn for the worse in March 1954 when his two-year-old daughter Pree died of cystic fibrosis and pneumonia. He attempted suicide twice in 1954, which once again landed him in a mental hospital.

== Artistry ==
Parker's style of composition involved writing original melodies over existing jazz forms and standards, a practice known as writing a contrafact, which is still common in jazz today. Examples include "Ornithology" (which borrows the chord progression of jazz standard "How High the Moon" and is said to be co-written with trumpet player Little Benny Harris), and "Moose The Mooche" (one of many Parker compositions based on the chord progression of "I Got Rhythm"). The practice was not uncommon prior to bebop, but it became a signature of the movement as artists began to move away from arranging popular standards and toward composing their own material. Perhaps Parker's most well-known contrafact is "Ko-Ko", which is based on the chord changes of the popular bebop tune "Cherokee", written by Ray Noble.

While tunes such as "Now's the Time", "Billie's Bounce", "Au Privave", "Barbados", "Relaxin' at Camarillo", "Bloomdido", and "Cool Blues" were based on conventional 12-bar blues changes, Parker also created a unique version of the 12-bar blues for tunes such as "Blues for Alice", "Laird Baird", and "Si Si". These unique chords are known popularly as "Bird changes". Like his solos, some of his compositions are characterized by long, complex melodic lines and minimum repetition, although he did employ the use of repetition in some tunes, most notably in "Now's the Time".

Parker contributed greatly to the modern jazz solo, one in which triplets and pick-up notes were used in unorthodox ways to lead into chord tones, affording the soloist more freedom to use passing tones, which soloists previously avoided. His recordings were used for a book of solo transcriptions, the posthumously published Charlie Parker Omnibook.

Other well-known Parker compositions include "Ah-Leu-Cha", "Anthropology" (co-written with Gillespie), "Confirmation", "Constellation", "Moose the Mooche", "Scrapple from the Apple" and "Yardbird Suite", the vocal version of which is called "What Price Love", with lyrics by Parker.

Miles Davis once said, "You can tell the history of jazz in four words: Louis Armstrong. Charlie Parker".

== Recognition and legacy ==
"Bird Lives" sculpture by Robert Graham in Kansas City, Missouri, dedicated March 1999

=== Awards ===
Grammy Award

Grammy Award history
Year	Category	Title	Genre	Label	Result
1974	Best Performance by a Soloist	First Recordings!	Jazz	Onyx	Winner

Grammy Hall of Fame

Recordings of Charlie Parker were inducted into the Grammy Hall of Fame, which is a special Grammy Award established in 1973 to honor recordings that are at least twenty-five years old and that have "qualitative or historical significance".

Grammy Hall of Fame Awards
Year recorded	Title	Genre	Label	Year inducted
1945	"Billie's Bounce"	Jazz (single)	Savoy	2002
1953	Jazz at Massey Hall	Jazz (album)	Debut	1995
1946	"Ornithology"	Jazz (single)	Dial	1989
1950	Charlie Parker with Strings	Jazz (album)	Mercury	1988

Inductions

Year inducted	Title
2004	Jazz at Lincoln Center: Nesuhi Ertegun Jazz Hall of Fame
1984	Grammy Lifetime Achievement Award
1979	Big Band and Jazz Hall of Fame

=== Government honors ===
In 1995, the U.S. Postal Service issued a 32-cent commemorative postage stamp in Parker's honor.

In 2002, the Library of Congress honored his recording "Ko-Ko" (1945) by adding it to the National Recording Registry.

=== East Village residence ===
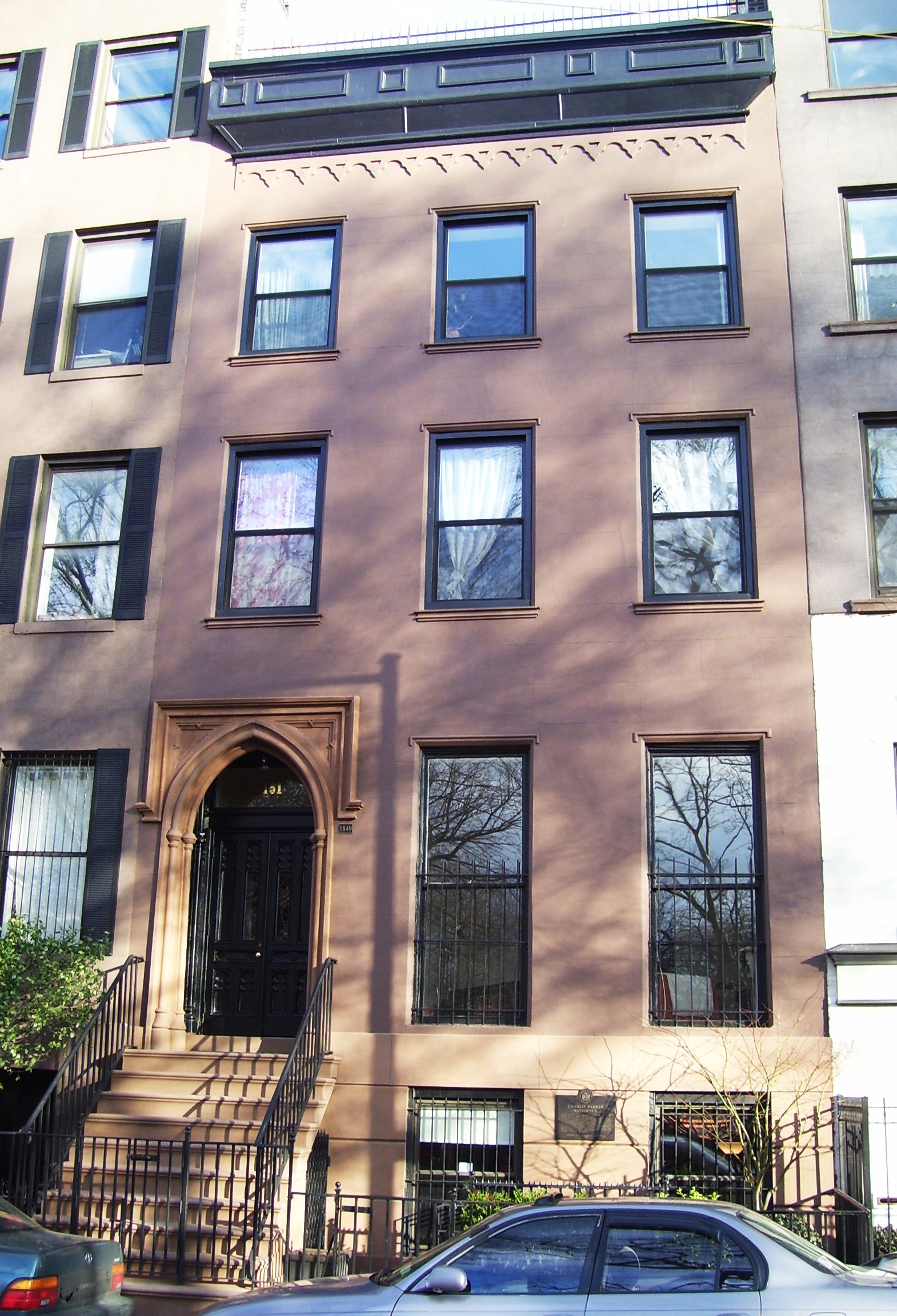
The Charlie Parker Residence, where Parker lived from 1950 to 1954

From 1950 to 1954, Parker lived with Chan Berg on the basement of the townhouse at 151 Avenue B, across from Tompkins Square Park in Manhattan's East Village. The Gothic Revival building, which was built around 1849, was added to the National Register of Historic Places in 1994 and was designated a New York City landmark in 1999. Avenue B between East 9th and East 10th Streets was given the honorary designation "Charlie Parker Place" in 1992.

=== Musical tributes ===
- Jack Kerouac's spoken poem "Charlie Parker" to backing piano by Steve Allen on Poetry for the Beat Generation (1959)
- In 2014, saxophonist and bandleader Aaron Johnson produced historically accurate recreations of the Charlie Parker with Strings albums.
- Lennie Tristano's overdubbed solo piano piece "Requiem" was recorded in tribute to Parker shortly after his death.
- American composer Moondog wrote his famous "Bird's Lament" in his memory; published on the 1969 album Moondog.
- Since 1972, the Californian ensemble Supersax harmonized many of Parker's improvisations for a five-piece saxophone ensemble.
- In 1979, guitarist Joe Pass released his album I Remember Charlie Parker in Parker's honor.
- Weather Report's jazz fusion track and highly acclaimed big band standard "Birdland", from the Heavy Weather album (1977), was a dedication by bandleader Joe Zawinul to both Charlie Parker and the New York 52nd Street club itself.
- The tribute song "Parker's Band" was recorded by Steely Dan for the 1974 album Pretzel Logic.
- Avant-garde jazz trombonist George E. Lewis recorded Homage to Charles Parker (1979).
- The opera Charlie Parker's Yardbird by Daniel Schnyder, libretto by Bridgette A. Wimberly, was premiered by Opera Philadelphia on June 5, 2015, with Lawrence Brownlee in the title role.
- The name of British 1960s blues-rock band The Yardbirds was at least partially inspired by Parker's nickname.
- Charles Mingus's song "Reincarnation of a Lovebird"
- In 1993, Anthony Braxton recorded a 2-CD album titled Charlie Parker Project, released in 1995. This material was re-released in 2018 as part of an 11-CD set titled Sextet (Parker) 1993.

=== Other tributes ===
- In 1949, the New York night club Birdland was named in his honor. Three years later, George Shearing wrote "Lullaby of Birdland", named for both Parker and the nightclub.
- The 1957 short story "Sonny's Blues" by James Baldwin features a jazz/blues playing virtuoso who names Bird as the "greatest" jazz musician, whose style he hopes to emulate.
- In 1959, Jack Kerouac completed his only full-length poetry work, Mexico City Blues, with two poems about Parker's importance, writing in those works that Parker's contribution to music was comparable to Ludwig van Beethoven's.
- The 1959 Beat comedy album How to Speak Hip, by comedians Del Close and John Brent, lists the three top most "uncool" actions (both in the audio and in the liner notes) as follows: "It is uncool to claim that you used to room with Bird. It is uncool to claim that you have Bird's axe. It is even less cool to ask 'Who is Bird?'"
- A memorial to Parker was dedicated in 1999 in Kansas City at 17th Terrace and The Paseo, near the American Jazz Museum located at 18th and Vine, featuring a 10-foot (3 m) tall bronze head sculpted by Robert Graham.
- The Charlie Parker Jazz Festival is a free two-day music festival that takes place every summer on the last weekend of August in Manhattan, New York City, at Marcus Garvey Park in Harlem and Tompkins Square Park on the Lower East Side, sponsored by the non-profit organization City Parks Foundation.
- The Annual Charlie Parker Celebration is an annual festival held in Kansas City, Kansas since 2014. It is held for 10 days and celebrates all aspects of Parker, from live jazz music and bootcamps, to tours of his haunts in the city, to exhibits at the American Jazz Museum.
- In the short-story collection Las armas secretas (The Secret Weapons), Julio Cortázar dedicated "El perseguidor" ('The Pursuer') to Charlie Parker. This story examines the last days of a drug-addicted saxophonist through the eyes of his biographer.
- In 1981, jazz historian Phil Schaap began to host Bird Flight, a radio show on WKCR New York dedicated entirely to Parker's music. The program continues to be broadcast on WKCR in 2022.
- In 1984, modern dance choreographer Alvin Ailey created the piece For Bird – With Love in honor of Parker. The piece chronicles his life from his early career to his failing health.
- A biographical film called Bird, starring Forest Whitaker as Parker and directed by Clint Eastwood, was released in 1988.
- In 1999, the Spanish metal band Saratoga wrote the song Charlie se Fue in honor of Charlie Parker, for the album Vientos de Guerra.
- In 2005, the Selmer Paris saxophone manufacturer commissioned a special "Tribute to Bird" alto saxophone, commemorating the 50th anniversary of Parker's death (1955–2005).
- Parker's performances of "I Remember You" (recorded for Clef Records in 1953, with the Charlie Parker Quartet, comprising Parker on alto saxophone, Al Haig on piano, Percy Heath on bass, and Max Roach on drums) and "Parker's Mood" (recorded for the Savoy label in 1948, with Parker on alto saxophone, John Lewis on piano, Curley Russell on bass, and Max Roach on drums) were selected by literary critic Harold Bloom for inclusion on his shortlist of the "twentieth-century American Sublime", the greatest works of American art produced in the 20th century. A vocalese version of "Parker's Mood" was a popular success for King Pleasure.
- Jean-Michel Basquiat created many paintings to honor Charlie Parker, including Charles the First, CPRKR, Bird on Money, Bird of Paradise, and Discography I.
- Charlie Watts, drummer for the Rolling Stones, wrote a children's book entitled Ode to a High Flying Bird as a tribute to Parker. Watts has cited Parker as a large influence on his life when he was a boy learning jazz.
- The 2014 film Whiplash repeatedly refers to the 1937 incident at the Reno Club, changing the aim point of the cymbals to his head and pointing to it as evidence that genius is not born but made by relentless practice and pitiless peers.
- Parker is referenced in the 2023 video game Marvel's Spider-Man 2. In the game, there is a side mission in which Parker's Saxophone is stolen and must be recovered by Miles Morales / Spider-Man. Once recovered, a character discusses Parker's music, making reference to his song, "Ornithology", and discussing his impact on jazz and hip-hop.
- Parker is mentioned in the comic strip The Far Side and author Gary Larson invites his audience to find amusement in what he perceives as Parker's disdain for introspective or slow-moving new-age music; implying that the legendary saxophonist would find it "hellishly" insipid.
- Parker is referenced in Haruki Murukami's short story collection, First Person Singular, in the short story titled Charlie Parker Plays Bossa Nova. In the story, the narrator writes a review for a fictional album by Charlie Parker titled Charlie Parker Plays Bossa Nova.

== See also ==
- List of atheists in music

== Citations ==
=== Bibliography ===
- Crouch, Stanley (2013). Kansas City Lighting: The Rise and Times of Charlie Parker. New York: Harper Perennial.
- Giddins, Gary (1998). Visions of Jazz: The First Century. Oxford University Press. ISBN 978-0-19-513241-0.
- Giddins, Gary (2013). Celebrating Bird: The Triumph of Charlie Parker (Revised ed.). University of Minnesota Press. ISBN 978-0-8166-9041-1.
- Gitler, Ira (1966). Jazz Masters of the Forties. MacMillian Co.
- Haddix, Chuck (2013). Bird: The Life and Music of Charlie Parker. University of Illinois Press. ISBN 978-0-252-09517-7.
- Priestley, Brian (1984). Charlie Parker. Tunbridge Wells: Spellmount.
- Reisner, George (1977). Bird: The Legend of Charlie Parker. New York: Da Capo Press. ISBN 9780306800696.
- Russell, Ross (1973). Bird Lives! The High Life & Hard Times of Charlie (Yardbird) Parker. New York: Charterhouse. ISBN 0-306-80679-7.
- Woideck, Carl (1998). Charlie Parker: His Music and Life. Ann Arbor: University of Michigan Press. ISBN 0-472-08555-7.
