= Curley Russell =

Trinidadian-American jazz bassist (1917–1986)

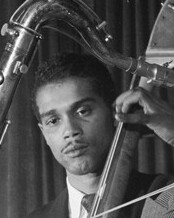
- Russell at Club 18, New York City, c. November 1947; by William P. Gottlieb

Background information
- Born: Dillon Russell; March 19, 1917; Trinidad, Trinidad and Tobago
- Died: July 3, 1986 (aged 69) Jamaica, Queens, New York, U.S.
- Genres: Jazz
- Occupation: Musician
- Instrument: Double bass
- Years active: 1940s–1950s

Dillon "Curley" Russell (March 19, 1917 – July 3, 1986) was an American jazz musician, who played bass on many bebop recordings.

== Biography ==
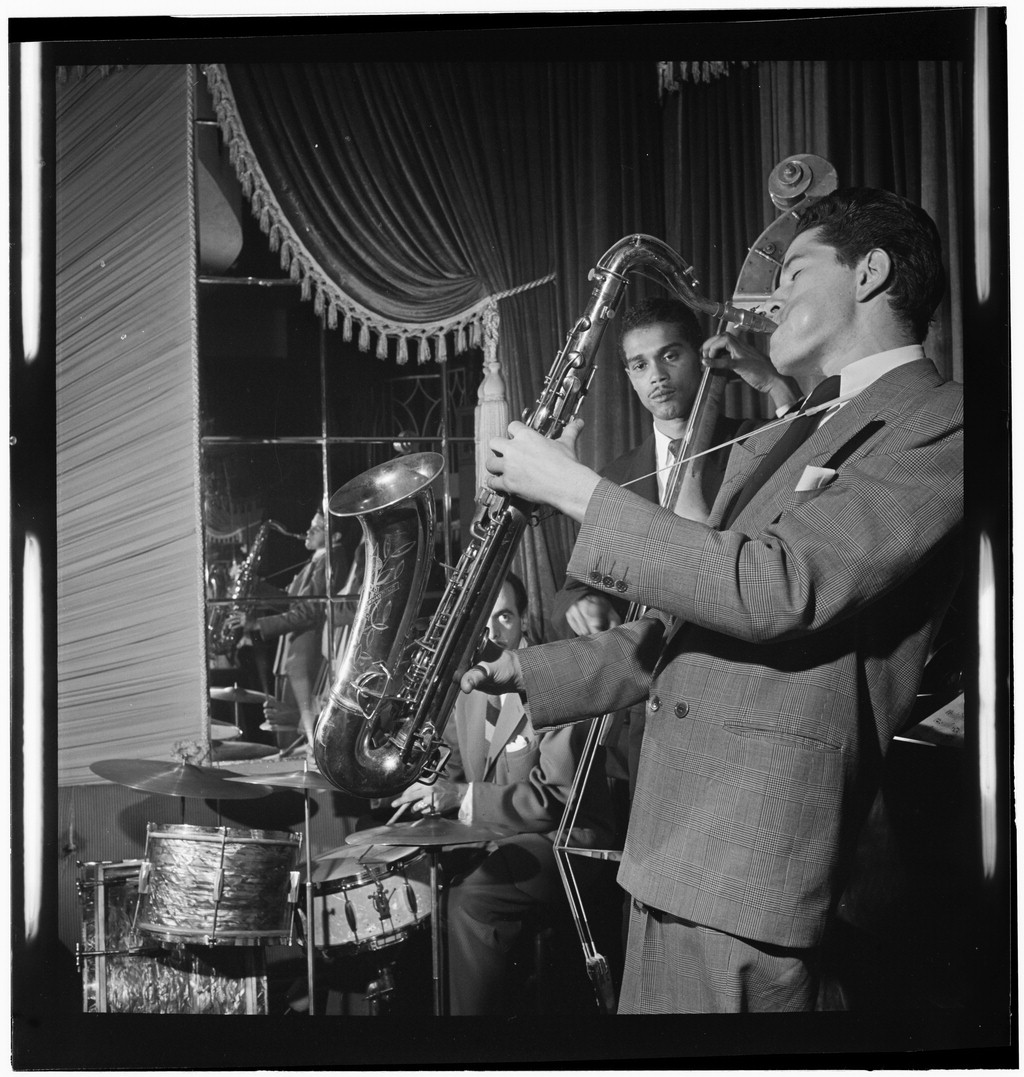
Russell (center) with saxophonist Allen Eager and drummer Art Mardigan at Club 18, New York City, c. November 1947

Russell was born in Trinidad. He was nicknamed "Curley" for his curly hair.

A member of the Tadd Dameron Sextet, he was in demand for his ability to play at the rapid tempos typical of bebop, and appears on several key recordings of the period. He left the music business in the late 1950s.

On May 1, 1951, Russell played in the recording session for "Un Poco Loco", composed by American jazz pianist Bud Powell, with Max Roach on drums. Literary critic Harold Bloom included this performance on his short list of the greatest works of twentieth-century American art. allen lowe

According to jazz historian Phil Schaap, the classic bebop tune "Donna Lee", a contrafact on "Back Home Again in Indiana", was named after Curley's daughter. (Note: Schaap learned this from saxophonist and music historian Allen Lowe, who was a friend of Russell.) In 2002, she donated her father's bass to the Institute of Jazz Studies at Rutgers University.

Russell died of emphysema at Queens General Hospital at the age of 69 in 1986.

== Discography ==
=== As sideman ===
- Charlie Parker, The Charlie Parker Story (Savoy Records, 1945 [1956])
- Charlie Parker, Memorial Vol. 1 (Savoy, 1947); Memorial Vol. 2 (Savoy 1947–48)
- Sonny Stitt, Sonny Stitt/Bud Powell/J. J. Johnson (Prestige, 1949–50 [1956]) – with Bud Powell
- Bud Powell, Jazz Giant (Verve, 1950)
- Fats Navarro, The Fabulous Fats Navarro, Vol. 1 and Vol. 2 (Blue Note, 1947–49)
- Miles Davis, The Real Birth of the Cool (Bandstand, 1948)
- Charlie Parker, One Night in Birdland (Columbia, 1950 [1977])
- Stan Getz, Early Stan (OJC, 1949–53)
- George Wallington, Trio (Savoy, 1949–51); Trios (OJC, 1952–53)
- Milt Jackson, Roll 'Em Bags (Savoy, 1949–56)
- Dexter Gordon, Dexter Rides Again (Savoy, 1950)
- Zoot Sims, Quartets (OJC, 1950)
- Bud Powell, The Amazing Bud Powell (Blue Note, 1951–53)
- Charlie Parker & Dizzy Gillespie, Bird and Diz (Verve, 1952)
- Coleman Hawkins, Disorder at the Border (Spotlite, 1952 [1973])
- Thelonious Monk, Thelonious Monk Trio/Blue Monk (Prestige, 1952–54); Monk (OJC, 1953–54)
- Al Cohn, Al Cohn's Tones (Savoy, 1950–53 [1956])
- Kenny Drew, New Faces – New Sounds (Blue Note, 1953)
- Horace Silver, Horace Silver Trio & Art Blakey–Sabu (Blue Note, 1953)
- Art Blakey, A Night at Birdland (Blue Note, 1954)
- Art Blakey, A Night at Birdland Vol. 1–3 (Blue Note, 1954)
- Art Blakey, A Night at Birdland Vol. 3 (Blue Note, 1954)
- J. J. Johnson, The Birdlanders (Fresh Sound, 1954)
- Johnny Griffin, Introducing Johnny Griffin (Blue Note, 1957)
- Clifford Jordan & John Gilmore, Blowing In from Chicago (Blue Note, 1957)
