= Bud Powell discography =

This is a discography of Bud Powell.

== Discography ==
=== Studio albums ===
==== Roost & Blue Note years ====
Year	Label	Catalogue number	Title	Date recorded	Notes
1951	Royal Roost	RLP-401	The Bud Powell Trio, Vol. 1	1947. 1953	10"; reissued as Bud Powell Trio
1952	Blue Note	BLP 5003	The Amazing Bud Powell	1949-08-08, 1951-05-01	10"
1954	Blue Note	BLP 5041	The Amazing Bud Powell, Vol. 2	1953-08-14	10"
1956	Blue Note	BLP 1503	The Amazing Bud Powell, Volume 1	1949-08-08, 1951-05-01, 1953-08-14	compiles BLP 5003 & BLP 5041
1956	Blue Note	BLP 1504	The Amazing Bud Powell, Volume 2	1949-08-08, 1951-05-01, 1953-08-14	compiles BLP 5003 & BLP 5041
1957	Roost	RLP 2224	Bud Powell Trio	1947, 1953	
1957	Blue Note	BLP 1571	Bud!	1957-08-03	AKA The Amazing Bud Powell, Vol. 3
1958	Blue Note	BLP 1598	Time Waits	1958-05-24	AKA The Amazing Bud Powell, Vol. 4
1959	Blue Note	BLP 4009	The Scene Changes	1958-12-29	AKA The Amazing Bud Powell, Vol. 5
1996	Roulette / Blue Note		Bud Plays Bird	1957-10-14, 1957-12-02, 1958-01-30	

==== Mercury & Verve years ====
Year	Label	Catalogue number	Title	Date recorded	Notes
1950	Mercury / Clef	MG C-102	Bud Powell Piano Solos	1949 – 1950	10"; originally released on three shellac discs
1952	Mercury / Clef	MG C-507	Bud Powell Piano Solos (No. 2)	1949 – 1950	10"; originally released on three shellac discs
1954	Mercury / Clef	MG C-610	Bud Powell's Moods	1950 – 1951	Reissued as The Genius of Bud Powell
1954	Norgran	MG N-23	The Artistry of Bud Powell	1954 – 1955	10"; reissued as Bud Powell's Moods
1955	Norgran	MGN 1017	Jazz Original	1954-12-16, 1955-01-11, -12	Reissued as Bud Powell '57
1956	Verve	MGV 8115	The Genius of Bud Powell	1950-07-01, 1951-02	Reissue of Bud Powell's Moods
1956	Norgran	MGN 1063	Jazz Giant	1949–50	reissued on Verve in 1957
1956	Verve	MGV 8153	Jazz Giant	1949–50	reissued on Verve in 1957
1956	Norgran	MGN 1064	Bud Powell's Moods	1954-06-02, -04, 1955-01-12	
1956	Verve	MGV 8154	Bud Powell's Moods	1954-06-02, -04, 1955-01-12	
1956	Norgran	MGN 1077	Piano Interpretations by Bud Powell	1955-04-25, -27	
1956	Verve	MGV 8167	Piano Interpretations by Bud Powell	1955-04-25, -27	
1957	Norgran	MGN 1098	Bud Powell '57	1954-12-16, 1955-01-11, -12	Reissue of Jazz Original
1957	Verve	MGV 8185	Bud Powell '57	1954-12-16, 1955-01-11, -12	Reissue of Jazz Original
1959	Verve	MGV 8301	The Lonely One...	1955-01-13, 1955-04-25, -27	
1958	Verve	MGV 8218	Blues in the Closet	1956-09-23	

==== Other labels ====
Year	Label	Title	Date recorded	Notes
1957	RCA Victor	Strictly Powell	1956-10-05	
1958	RCA Victor	Swingin' with Bud	1957-02-11	
1962	Sonet / Storyville	Bouncing with Bud	1962-04-26	AKA In Copenhagen
1964	Reprise	Bud Powell in Paris	1963–02	
1964	Fontana/Black Lion	The Invisible Cage	1964–07–31	AKA Blues for Bouffemont
1964	Roulette	The Return of Bud Powell	1964-09-18	
1965	Columbia	A Portrait of Thelonious	1961–12–17	
1973	Mainstream	Ups 'n Downs	1964 – 1966	
1979	Columbia	A Tribute to Cannonball	1961–12–15	

=== Live and home recordings ===
Year	Label	Title	Date recorded	Notes
1953	Debut	Jazz at Massey Hall	1953	10"; live; with The Quintet (Dizzy Gillespie, Charlie Parker, Charles Mingus, Max Roach)
1953	Debut	Jazz at Massey Hall, Vol. 2	1953	10"; live
1963	Impulse!	Americans in Europe, Vol. 1	1963	
1963	Impulse!	Americans in Europe, Vol. 2	1963	
	ESP-Disk	Winter Broadcasts 1953	1953	
	ESP-Disk	Spring Broadcasts 1953	1953	
	ESP-Disk	Summer Broadcasts 1953	1953	
	ESP-Disk	Autumn Broadcasts 1953	1953	
	Queen Disc [Italy]	Live at Birdland	1953	
1975	Xanadu	Bud in Paris	1959–12–12, 1960–02–14, 1960–03–12, 1960–06–15, 1960–10–14	
	Moon [Italy]	Pianology	1961	
	Stretch Archives	Bud Powell Live in Lausanne 1962	1962	
	Norma [Japan]	Bud Powell Live in Geneva	1962	
1978	SteepleChase	Bud Powell Trio at the Golden Circle, Vol. 1	1962	
1978	SteepleChase	Bud Powell Trio at the Golden Circle, Vol. 2	1962	
1978	SteepleChase	Bud Powell Trio at the Golden Circle, Vol. 3	1962	
1978	SteepleChase	Bud Powell Trio at the Golden Circle, Vol. 4	1962	
1978	SteepleChase	Bud Powell Trio at the Golden Circle, Vol. 5	1962	
	SteepleChase	Budism	1962	
	SteepleChase	1962 Copenhagen	1962	
	SteepleChase	1962 Stockholm-Oslo	1962	
1982	Elektra/Musician	Inner Fires	1953	E1-60030
	Fontana	Bud Powell at Home – Strictly Confidential	1962–1964	
	Fontana	Hot House	1964	
1988	Black Lion	The Essen Jazz Festival Concert	1960	
1989	Mythic Sound	Early Years of a Genius, 44–48	1944–1948	AKA Earl Bud Powell, Vol. 1
1989	Mythic Sound	Burnin' in U.S.A., 53–55	1953–1955	AKA Earl Bud Powell, Vol. 2
1989	Mythic Sound	Cookin' at Saint-Germain, 57–59	1957–1959	AKA Earl Bud Powell, Vol. 3
1989	Mythic Sound	Relaxin' at Home, 61–64	1961–1964	AKA Earl Bud Powell, Vol. 4
1989	Mythic Sound	Groovin' at the Blue Note, 59–61	1959–1961	AKA Earl Bud Powell, Vol. 5
1989	Mythic Sound	Writin' for Duke, 63	1963	AKA Earl Bud Powell, Vol. 6
1989	Mythic Sound	Tribute to Thelonious, 64	1964	AKA Earl Bud Powell, Vol. 7
1989	Mythic Sound	Holidays in Edenville, 64	1964	AKA Earl Bud Powell, Vol. 8
1989	Mythic Sound	Return to Birdland, 64	1964	AKA Earl Bud Powell, Vol. 9
1989	Mythic Sound	Award at Birdland, 64	1964	AKA Earl Bud Powell, Vol. 10
1989	Mythic Sound	Gift for the Friends, 60–64	1960–1964	AKA Earl Bud Powell, Vol. 11
1994	Dreyfus Jazz	'Round About Midnight at the Blue Note	1962	
2004	Piadrum	Eternity	1961–1964	

=== Notable compilations ===
- Tempus Fugue-It (Proper) – Four disc set, from 1944 recordings with Cootie Williams to the first sessions for Blue Note and Clef in 1949–50.
- The Complete Bud Powell on Verve – Five discs, sessions from 1949 to 1956.
- The Best of Bud Powell on Verve – Single disc compilation.
- The Best of Bud Powell (Blue Note) – Single disc compilation.
- The Complete Blue Note and Roost Recordings – Four disc set containing all of the Amazing Bud Powell... Blue Note sessions plus Roost sessions from 1947 and 1953. The Blue Note sessions have also been remastered and reissued as individual CDs (though the Roost material is not included).
- The Complete RCA Trio Sessions – Contains Swingin' with Bud and Strictly Powell.

=== As sideman ===
Dexter Gordon

- Dexter Rides Again (Savoy, 1958) – 1946 session only
- Our Man in Paris (Blue Note, 1963)

With others

- Art Blakey, Paris Jam Session (Fontana, 1959)
- J. J. Johnson, J. J. Johnson's Jazz Quintets (Savoy, 1950s) – 1946 session only
- Charles Mingus, Mingus at Antibes (Atlantic, 1976) – rec. 1960. plays on "I'll Remember April".
- Charlie Parker, One Night in Birdland (Columbia, 1977)
- Frank Socolow, New York Journeyman – Complete Recordings (Fresh Sound, 2005) – 1945 session only
- Sonny Stitt, Sonny Stitt/Bud Powell/J. J. Johnson (Prestige, 1957) – rec. 1949–1950
- Cootie Williams, Cootie Williams and His Orchestra 1941–1944 (Classics, 1995)
