= The Complete Bud Powell on Verve =

Compilation album by Bud Powell
- Released: September 27, 1994
- Recorded: 1949–1956
- Genre: Jazz
- Label: Verve
- Producer: Norman Granz

Bud Powell chronology
| The Best of Bud Powell on Verve (1994) | The Complete Bud Powell on Verve (1994) | The Complete Blue Note and Roost Recordings (1994) |

Professional ratings
Review scores
| Source | Rating |
|---|---|
| Allmusic | 4.5/5 stars |
| The Penguin Guide to Jazz Recordings | 4/4 stars |

The Complete Bud Powell on Verve is a five-disc box set, released on September 27, 1994, by Verve Records, containing all of jazz pianist Bud Powell's recordings as leader for producer Norman Granz.

== Track listing ==
All songs were written by Bud Powell, except where noted.

=== Disc one ===
1. "Tempus Fugue-it" (aka "Tempus Fugit") – 2:25
2. "Celia" – 2:57
3. "Cherokee" (Ray Noble) – 3:37
4. "I'll Keep Loving You" – 2:40
5. "Strictly Confidential" – 3:08
6. "All God's Chillun Got Rhythm" (Bronislaw Kaper, Gus Kahn, Walter Jurmann) – 2:59
7. "So Sorry, Please" – 3:14
8. "Get Happy" (Harold Arlen, Ted Koehler) – 2:51
9. "Sometimes I'm Happy" (Vincent Youmans, Irving Caesar) – 3:36
10. "Sweet Georgia Brown" (Maceo Pinkard, Kenneth Casey) – 2:48
11. "Yesterdays" (Jerome Kern, Otto Harbach) – 2:49
12. "April in Paris" (Vernon Duke, E.Y. "Yip" Harburg) – 3:08
13. "Body and Soul" (Johnny Green, Edward Heyman, Robert Sour, Frank Eyton) – 3:20
14. "Hallelujah!" (Youmans, Leo Robin, Clifford Grey) – 2:58
15. "Tea for Two" [compilation take (take 6)] (Youmans, Caesar) – 4:13
16. "Tea for Two" [common take (take 5)] (Youmans, Caesar) – 3:29
17. "Tea for Two" [78 take (take 10)] (Youmans, Caesar) – 3:46
18. "Parisian Thoroughfare" (aka "Parisienne Thorofare") – 2:28
19. "Oblivion" – 2:08
20. "Dusk in Sandi" (aka "Dusky 'n' Sandy") – 2:13
21. "Hallucinations" (aka "Budo") – 2:25
22. "The Fruit" – 3:16
23. "A Nightingale Sang in Berkeley Square" (Manning Sherwin, Jack Strachey, Eric Maschwitz) – 3:41
24. "Just One of Those Things" (Cole Porter) – 3:50
25. "The Last Time I Saw Paris" (Kern, Oscar Hammerstein II) – 3:18

=== Disc two ===
1. "Moonlight in Vermont" (Karl Suessdorf, John Blackburn) – 3:35
2. "Spring Is Here" (Richard Rodgers, Lorenz Hart) – 3:27
3. "Buttercup" – 2:59
4. "Fantasy in Blue" – 3:04
5. "It Never Entered My Mind" (Rodgers, Hart) – 2:56
6. "A Foggy Day" (George Gershwin, Ira Gershwin) – 3:45
7. "Time Was" (aka "Duerme" «Sleep») (Miguel Prado, Gabriel Luna, Bob Russell) – 4:17
8. "My Funny Valentine" (Rodgers, Hart) – 2:53
9. "Like Someone in Love" [incomplete] (Jimmy Van Heusen, Johnny Burke) – 1:39
10. "Like Someone in Love" (Van Heusen, Burke) – 2:00
11. "Deep Night" (Charles E. Henderson, Rudy Vallée) – 3:45
12. "That Old Black Magic" [incomplete] (Harold Arlen, Johnny Mercer) – 0:55
13. "That Old Black Magic [alternate take 1] (Arlen, Mercer) – 2:27
14. "That Old Black Magic (Arlen, Mercer) – 2:21
15. "That Old Black Magic [alternate take 2] (Arlen, Mercer) – 2:54
16. "'Round Midnight" (Thelonious Monk) – 5:08

=== Disc three ===
1. "Thou Swell" [alternate take] (Richard Rodgers, Lorenz Hart) – 4:06
2. "Thou Swell" (Rodgers, Hart) – 4:29
3. "Someone to Watch Over Me" (George Gershwin, Ira Gershwin) – 2:33
4. "Bean and the Boys" (contrafact of "Lover Come Back to Me") (Coleman Hawkins) – 3:36
5. "Tenderly" [incomplete] (Walter Gross, Jack Lawrence) – 0:23
6. "Tenderly" (Gross, Lawrence) – 3:20
7. "How High the Moon" (Morgan Lewis, Nancy Hamilton) – 4:23
8. "I Get a Kick out of You" [incomplete] (Cole Porter) – 0:35
9. "I Get a Kick out of You" (Porter) – 4:26
10. "I Get a Kick out of You" [alternate take] (Porter) – 3:58
11. "The Best Thing for You (Would Be Me)" [incomplete] (Irving Berlin) – 1:29
12. "You Go to My Head" (J. Fred Coots, Haven Gillespie) – 4:11
13. "The Best Thing for You (Would Be Me)" (aka "The Best") (Berlin) – 2:41
14. "Mediocre" – 2:55
15. "All the Things You Are" (Jerome Kern, Oscar Hammerstein II) – 3:30
16. "Epistrophy" (Thelonious Monk, Kenny Clarke) – 3:00
17. "Dance of the Infidels" – 2:16
18. "Salt Peanuts" (Dizzy Gillespie, Clarke) – 2:19
19. "Hey George" (aka "Sweet Georgia Brown") (Maceo Pinkard, Kenneth Casey) – 3:25

=== Disc four ===
1. "Conception" [incomplete] (George Shearing) – 0:09
2. "Conception" (Shearing) – 3:45
3. "Bean and the Boys" [incomplete] (Coleman Hawkins) – 0:28
4. "Bean and the Boys" (Hawkins) – 4:04
5. "Heart and Soul" (Hoagy Carmichael, Frank Loesser) – 2:52
6. "Heart and Soul" [alternate take 1] (Carmichael, Loesser) – 2:31
7. "Heart and Soul" [alternate take 2] (Carmichael, Loesser) – 3:22
8. "Willow Grove" (aka "Willow Groove") [alternate take] – 3:17
9. "Willow Grove" (aka "Willow Groove") – 4:27
10. "Crazy Rhythm" (Joseph Meyer, Roger Wolfe Kahn, Irving Caesar) – 3:32
11. "Willow Weep for Me" (Ann Ronnell) – 4:40
12. "Bean and the Boys" (Hawkins) – 5:24
13. "East of the Sun (and West of the Moon)" [alternate take] (Brooks Bowman) – 3:48
14. "East of the Sun (and West of the Moon)" [incomplete] (Bowman) – 0:30
15. "East of the Sun (and West of the Moon)" (Bowman) – 3:58
16. "Lady Bird" [alternate take 1] (Tadd Dameron) – 3:11
17. "Lady Bird" [incomplete] (Dameron) – 0:18
18. "Lady Bird" [alternate take 2] (Dameron) – 3:38
19. "Stairway to the Stars" [incomplete] (Matty Malneck, Frank Signorelli, Mitchell Parish) – 0:05
20. "Stairway to the Stars" (Malneck, Signorelli, Parish) – 5:01
21. "Lady Bird" (Dameron) – 4:44

=== Disc five ===
1. "Lullaby in Rhythm" [incomplete] (Clarence Profit, Edgar Sampson, Benny Goodman, Walter Hirsch) – 0:28
2. "Lullaby in Rhythm" (Profit, Sampson, Goodman, Hirsch) – 4:00
3. "Star Eyes" [alternate take 1] (Gene De Paul, Don Raye) – 3:18
4. "Star Eyes" [alternate take 2] (De Paul, Raye) – 3:14
5. "Star Eyes" [alternate take 3] (De Paul, Raye) – 3:52
6. "Star Eyes" [incomplete] (De Paul, Raye) – 0:29
7. "Star Eyes" [alternate take 4] (De Paul, Raye) – 3:54
8. "Star Eyes" (De Paul, Raye) – 3:31
9. "Confirmation" (Charlie Parker) – 4:21
10. "When I Fall in Love" (Victor Young, Edward Heyman) – 1:39
11. "My Heart Stood Still" (Richard Rodgers, Lorenz Hart) – 3:29
12. "Blues in the Closet" (aka "Collard Greens and Black Eyed Peas") (Harry Babasin, Oscar Pettiford) – 3:01
13. "Swingin' Till the Girls Come Home" (Pettiford) – 3:21
14. "I Know That You Know" (Vincent Youmans, Anne Caldwell) – 2:23
15. "Elegy" (aka "Elegie" and "Elogie") – 2:56
16. "Woody 'n' You" (Dizzy Gillespie) – 3:52
17. "I Should Care" (Sammy Cahn, Axel Stordahl, Paul Weston) – 3:38
18. "Now's the Time" (Charlie Parker) – 4:32
19. "I Didn't Know What Time It Was" (Rodgers, Hart) – 3:58
20. "Be-Bop" (Gillespie) – 2:23
21. "52nd Street Theme" (Thelonious Monk) – 2:23

== Personnel ==
=== Performance ===
Bud Powell plays piano on all tracks.

February 23, 1949, disc 1, tracks 1–6. See Jazz Giant.

- Ray Brown – bass (except track 4 – Powell solo)
- Max Roach – drums (except track 4 – Powell solo)

February 1950, disc 1, tracks 7–13. See Jazz Giant.

- Curly Russell – bass (except track 11 – Powell solo)
- Max Roach – drums (except track 11 – Powell solo)

July 1, 1950, disc 1, tracks 14–17. See The Genius of Bud Powell.

- Ray Brown – bass
- Buddy Rich – drums

February 1951, disc 1, tracks 18–25 – Powell solos. See The Genius of Bud Powell.

June 2, 1954, disc 2, tracks 1–4. See Bud Powell's Moods.

- George Duvivier – bass
- Art Taylor – drums

June 4, 1954, disc 2, tracks 5–8. See Bud Powell's Moods.

- Percy Heath – bass
- Art Taylor – drums

December 16, 1954, disc 2, tracks 9–16. See Jazz Original.

- Percy Heath – bass (except track 10 – Powell solo)
- Max Roach – drums (except tracks 9–10)

January 11, 1955, disc 3, tracks 1–6. January 12, 1955, disc 3, tracks 7–13. See Jazz Original and Bud Powell's Moods.

- Lloyd Trotman – bass
- Art Blakey – drums

January 13, 1955, disc 3, tracks 14–19. See The Lonely One....

- Percy Heath – bass
- Kenny Clarke – drums

April 25, 1955, disc 4, tracks 1–11. April 27, 1955, disc 4, tracks 12–21 and disc 5, tracks 1–9. See Piano Interpretations and The Lonely One....

- George Duvivier – bass
- Art Taylor – drums

September 13, 1956, disc 5, tracks 10–21. See Blues in the Closet.

- Ray Brown – bass
- Osie Johnson – drums

=== Production ===
- Norman Granz – producer
- Peter Pullman – liner notes
- David Lau, Lisa Po-Ying Huang – graphic design
