= Jazz Original =

Studio album by Bud Powell
- Released: 1955
- Recorded: December 16, 1954, January 11 & 12, 1955
- Genre: Jazz
- Length: 31:08
- Label: Norgran
- Producer: Norman Granz

Bud Powell chronology
| The Amazing Bud Powell, Vol. 2 (1954) | Jazz Original (1955) | The Genius of Bud Powell (1956) |

Professional ratings
Review scores
| Source | Rating |
|---|---|
| Allmusic | 4.5/5 stars |

Jazz Original, also known as Bud Powell '57, is a studio album by jazz pianist Bud Powell, released in 1955 by Norgran, featuring sessions that Powell recorded at Fine Sound Studios in New York in 1954 and 1955.

The album was re-issued by Norgran as Bud Powell '57 in 1957, re-issued again on LP by Verve and released on CD, also as Bud Powell '57, by Verve in 2005 with the same track listing as the original LP.

== History ==
If one excludes the three tribute albums Bud Plays Bird, A Tribute to Cannonball, and A Portrait of Thelonious, there are no compositions by Powell on the album, only jazz standards. As the liner notes on the Bud Powell '57 LP re-issue point out, standards from the 1920s in particular: "Someone to Watch Over Me" (1926), "Thou Swell" (1927), "Lover Come Back to Me" (1928), and "Deep Night" (1929). "How High the Moon" is the sole track from the January 12, 1955 session. Three other tracks from the session appear on Bud Powell's Moods.

== Track listing ==
1. "Deep Night" (Charles E. Henderson, Rudy Vallée) – 3:44
2. "That Old Black Magic" (Harold Arlen, Johnny Mercer) – 2:20
3. "'Round Midnight" (Thelonious Monk) – 5:08
4. "Thou Swell" (Richard Rodgers, Lorenz Hart) – 4:25
5. "Like Someone in Love" (Jimmy Van Heusen, Johnny Burke) – 1:59
6. "Someone to Watch Over Me" (George Gershwin, Ira Gershwin) – 2:28
7. "Bean and the Boys" (Coleman Hawkins) –3:28
8. "Tenderly" (Walter Gross, Jack Lawrence) – 3:20
9. "How High the Moon" (Morgan Lewis, Nancy Hamilton) – 4:16

== Personnel ==
=== Performance ===
- Bud Powell – piano

December 16, 1954, Fine Sound Studios, New York, tracks 1–3, 5

- Percy Heath – double bass (except 5)
- Max Roach – drums (except 5)

January 11, 1955, Fine Sound Studios, New York, tracks 4, 6–8

- Lloyd Trotman – bass
- Art Blakey – drums

January 12, 1955, Fine Sound Studios, New York, track 9

- Lloyd Trotman – bass
- Art Blakey – drums

=== Production ===
- Norman Granz – producer
- Herman Leonard – cover photo
