= The Complete Blue Note and Roost Recordings =

Box set by Bud Powell
- Released: October 4, 1994
- Recorded: 1947–1963
- Genre: Jazz
- Label: Blue Note
- Producer: Alfred Lion

Bud Powell chronology
The Best of Bud Powell on Verve (1994)	The Complete Blue Note and Roost Recordings (1994)	Bud Plays Bird (1997)

Professional ratings
Review scores
Source	Rating
AllMusic	5/5 stars
Encyclopedia of Popular Music	5/5 stars
The Penguin Guide to Jazz Recordings	4/4 stars

The Complete Blue Note and Roost Recordings is a four-disc box set by American jazz pianist Bud Powell compiling his recordings as leader for Blue Note, and two early sessions for Roost, released by Blue Note on October 4, 1994.

== Track listing ==
All tracks are written by Bud Powell, except as noted.

Disc one
No.	Title	Writer(s)	Date recorded	Length
1.	"I'll Remember April"	Gene de Paul; Patricia Johnston; Don Raye	January 10, 1947	2:54
2.	"(Back Home Again in) Indiana"	James F. Hanley; Ballard MacDonald	January 10, 1947	2:45
3.	"Somebody Loves Me"	George Gershwin; Ballard MacDonald; B. G. De Sylva	January 10, 1947	2:56
4.	"I Should Care"	Axel Stordahl; Paul Weston; Sammy Cahn	January 10, 1947	3:02
5.	"Bud's Bubble"		January 10, 1947	2:36
6.	"Off Minor"	Thelonious Monk	January 10, 1947	2:24
7.	"Nice Work If You Can Get It"	George Gershwin; Ira Gershwin	January 10, 1947	2:20
8.	"Everything Happens to Me"	Matt Dennis; Tom Adair	January 10, 1947	2:41
9.	"Bouncing with Bud" (alternate take #1)	Gil Fuller; Powell	August 9, 1949	3:03
10.	"Bouncing with Bud" (alternate take #2)	Fuller; Powell	August 9, 1949	3:12
11.	"Bouncing with Bud"	Fuller; Powell	August 9, 1949	3:01
12.	"Wail" (alternate take)		August 9, 1949	2:38
13.	"Wail"		August 9, 1949	3:02
14.	"Dance of the Infidels" (alternate take)		August 9, 1949	2:52
15.	"Dance of the Infidels"		August 9, 1949	2:50
16.	"52nd Street Theme"	Monk	August 9, 1949	2:45
17.	"You Go to My Head"	J. Fred Coots; Haven Gillespie	August 9, 1949	3:11
18.	"Ornithology"	Benny Harris; Charlie Parker	August 9, 1949	2:20
19.	"Ornithology" (alternate take)	Harris; Parker	August 9, 1949	3:07
20.	"Un Poco Loco" (alternate take #1)		May 1, 1951	3:46
21.	"Un Poco Loco"		May 1, 1951	4:28
22.	"Un Poco Loco"		May 1, 1951	4:42
23.	"Over the Rainbow"	Harold Arlen; E.Y. "Yip" Harburg	May 1, 1951	2:55

Disc two
No.	Title	Writer(s)	Date recorded	Length
1.	"A Night in Tunisia"	Dizzy Gillespie; Frank Paparelli	May 1, 1951	4:16
2.	"A Night in Tunisia" (alternate take)	Gillespie; Paparelli	May 1, 1951	3:52
3.	"It Could Happen to You" (alternate take)	Jimmy Van Heusen; Johnny Burke	May 1, 1951	2:22
4.	"It Could Happen to You"	Van Heusen; Burke	May 1, 1951	3:16
5.	"Parisian Thoroughfare"		May 1, 1951	3:25
6.	"Autumn in New York"	Vernon Duke	August 14, 1953	2:51
7.	"Reets and I"	Benny Harris	August 14, 1953	3:18
8.	"Reets and I" (alternate take)	Harris	August 14, 1953	2:30
9.	"Sure Thing"	Jerome Kern; Ira Gershwin	August 14, 1953	2:39
10.	"Collard Greens and Black-Eyed Peas" (alternate take)	Oscar Pettiford	August 14, 1953	2:11
11.	"Collard Greens and Black-Eyed Peas"	Pettiford	August 14, 1953	3:01
12.	"Polka Dots and Moonbeams"	Van Heusen; Burke	August 14, 1953	4:00
13.	"I Want to Be Happy"	Vincent Youmans; Irving Caesar	August 14, 1953	2:50
14.	"Audrey"		August 14, 1953	2:54
15.	"Glass Enclosure"		August 14, 1953	2:21
16.	"Embraceable You"	George Gershwin; Ira Gershwin	September 1953	2:51
17.	"Burt Covers Bud"		September 1953	3:07
18.	"My Heart Stood Still"	Richard Rodgers; Lorenz Hart	September 1953	3:20
19.	"You'd Be So Nice to Come Home To"	Cole Porter	September 1953	2:41
20.	"Bags' Groove"	Milt Jackson	September 1953	2:14
21.	"My Devotion"	Roc Hillman; Johnny Napton	September 1953	3:05
22.	"Stella by Starlight"	Victor Young	September 1953	2:10
23.	"Woody 'n' You"	Dizzy Gillespie	September 1953	3:00

Disc three
No.	Title	Writer(s)	Date recorded	Length
1.	"Blue Pearl"		August 3, 1957	3:46
2.	"Blue Pearl" (alternate take)		August 3, 1957	4:03
3.	"Keepin' in the Groove"		August 3, 1957	2:53
4.	"Some Soul"		August 3, 1957	6:56
5.	"Frantic Fancies"		August 3, 1957	4:50
6.	"Bud on Bach"		August 3, 1957	2:30
7.	"Idaho"	Jesse Stone	August 3, 1957	5:14
8.	"Don't Blame Me"	Jimmy McHugh • Dorothy Fields	August 3, 1957	7:31
9.	"Moose the Mooche"	Parker	August 3, 1957	5:45
10.	"John's Abbey"		May 24, 1958	5:36
11.	"Sub City" (alternate take)		May 24, 1958	2:36
12.	"Sub City"		May 24, 1958	4:32
13.	"John's Abbey" (alternate take)		May 24, 1958	2:25
14.	"Buster Rides Again"		May 24, 1958	5:30

Disc four
No.	Title	Writer(s)	Date recorded	Length
1.	"Dry Soul"		May 24, 1958	6:41
2.	"Marmalade"		May 24, 1958	4:28
3.	"Monopoly"		May 24, 1958	4:47
4.	"Time Waits"		May 24, 1958	5:06
5.	"The Scene Changes"		December 28, 1958	3:59
6.	"Down with It"		December 28, 1958	3:58
7.	"Comin' Up" (alternate take)		December 28, 1958	5:26
8.	"Comin' Up"		December 28, 1958	7:54
9.	"Duid Deed"		December 28, 1958	5:06
10.	"Cleopatra's Dream"		December 28, 1958	4:22
11.	"Gettin' There"		December 28, 1958	5:01
12.	"Crossin' the Channel"		December 28, 1958	3:28
13.	"Danceland"		December 28, 1958	3:41
14.	"Borderick"		December 28, 1958	1:58
15.	"Like Someone in Love"	Van Heusen; Burke	May 23, 1963	6:18

== Personnel ==
=== Musicians ===
==== January 10, 1947 ====
- Bud Powell – piano
- Curly Russell – bass
- Max Roach – drums
  - New York. Roost session – see Bud Powell Trio

==== August 9, 1949 ====
- Bud Powell – piano
- Fats Navarro – trumpet (except "You Go to My Head" and "Ornithology")
- Sonny Rollins – tenor sax (except "You Go to My Head" and "Ornithology")
- Tommy Potter – bass
- Roy Haynes – drums
  - WOR Studios, New York. See The Amazing Bud Powell, Vol. 1

==== May 1, 1951 ====
- Bud Powell – piano
- Curly Russell – bass (except "Over the Rainbow" and "A Night in Tunisia")
- Max Roach – drums (except "Over the Rainbow" and "A Night in Tunisia")
  - WOR Studios, New York. See The Amazing Bud Powell, Vol. 1 and The Amazing Bud Powell, Vol. 2

==== August 14, 1953 ====
- Bud Powell – piano
- George Duvivier – bass
- Art Taylor – drums
  - WOR Studios, New York. See The Amazing Bud Powell, Vol. 2

==== September 1953 ====
- Bud Powell – piano
- George Duvivier – bass
- Art Taylor – drums
  - New York. Roost session – see Bud Powell Trio

==== August 3, 1957 ====
- Bud Powell – piano
- Curtis Fuller – trombone (tracks 7–9)
- Paul Chambers – bass (except track 6 – Powell solo)
- Art Taylor – drums (except track 6 – Powell solo)
  - Rudy Van Gelder Studio, Hackensack, New Jersey. See Bud! The Amazing Bud Powell (Vol. 3)

==== May 24, 1958 ====
- Bud Powell – piano
- Sam Jones – bass
- Philly Joe Jones – drums
  - Rudy Van Gelder Studio, Hackensack, New Jersey. See Time Waits: The Amazing Bud Powell (Vol. 4)

==== December 28, 1958 ====
- Bud Powell – piano
- Paul Chambers – bass
- Art Taylor – drums
  - Rudy Van Gelder Studio, Hackensack, New Jersey. See The Scene Changes: The Amazing Bud Powell (Vol. 5)

==== May 23, 1963 ====
- Bud Powell – piano
- Pierre Michelot – bass
- Kenny Clarke – drums
  - CBS Studios, Paris. Disc 4, track 15. See Dexter Gordon's Our Man in Paris
