= At the Golden Circle =

- Vol. 1 of the album's 5 volumes

Live album by Bud Powell
- Released: 1978
- Recorded: April 19 & 23, 1962
- Venue: The Golden Circle, Stockholm
- Genre: Jazz, bebop
- Length: 194:32
- Label: SteepleChase

Bud Powell chronology
One Night in Birdland (1977)	At the Golden Circle (1978)	A Tribute to Cannonball (1979)

At the Golden Circle is a live album by jazz pianist Bud Powell, bassist Torbjorn Hultcrantz, and drummer Sune Spångberg. Recorded at the Golden Circle jazz club in Stockholm on two nights, it was released as a five-volume set by SteepleChase. SteepleChase condensed the album into two volumes in a later release as Swedish Pastry.

== Critical reception ==
Professional ratings
Review scores
Source	Rating
Allmusic	3/5 stars
The Penguin Guide to Jazz	2.5/4 stars

Scott Yanow addressed each of the volumes individually, but assigned them all three stars. He noted, "The entire series is worth picking up by listeners who enjoy bop-based piano" and praised the music while criticizing the length of the album. Richard Cook in The Penguin Guide to Jazz sharply criticized the number of volumes, claiming "Volume 5 is probably a disc too far."

== Track listing ==
All compositions by Bud Powell unless otherwise indicated

=== Vol. 1 ===
1. "Move" (Denzil Best) – 6:31
2. "Just a Gigolo" (Julius Brammer, Irving Caesar, Leonello Casucci) – 1:16
3. "Relaxin' at Camarillo" (Charlie Parker) – 9:08
4. "I Remember Clifford" (Benny Golson) – 8:44
5. "Reets and I" (Benny Harris) – 1:47
6. "Hackensack" (Thelonious Monk) – 5:46

=== Vol. 2 ===
1. "Like Someone in Love" (Johnny Burke, Jimmy Van Heusen) – 8:17
2. "I Hear Music" (Burton Lane, Frank Loesser) – 7:25
3. "Moose the Mooche" (Parker) – 5:52
4. "Blues in the Closet" (Oscar Pettiford) – 15:21
5. "Star Eyes" (Gene de Paul, Don Raye) – 3:25

=== Vol. 3 ===
1. "Swedish Pastry" (Barney Kessel) – 18:26
2. "I Remember Clifford" (Golson) – 9:09
3. "I Hear Music" (Lane, Loesser) – 7:08

=== Vol. 4 ===
1. "Moose the Mooche" (Parker) – 6:31
2. "Star Eyes" (DePaul, Raye) – 7:59
3. "Blues in the Closet" (Pettiford) – 7:45
4. "Reets and I" (Harris) – 8:52
5. "John's Abbey" – 7:45
6. "Old Devil Moon" (Yip Harburg, Lane) – 6:28

=== Vol. 5 ===
1. "Hot House" (Tadd Dameron) – 7:54
2. "This Is No Laughin' Matter" (Buddy Kaye) – 8:32
3. "52nd Street Theme" (Monk) – 4:07
4. "Straight, No Chaser" (Monk) – 20:00
5. Closing remarks – 0:35

== Personnel ==
- Bud Powell – piano, vocals (vol. 5, track 2)
- Torbjorn Hultcrantz – bass
- Sune Spångberg – drums
