= The Lonely One... =

Studio album by Bud Powell
- Released: September 3, 1959
- Recorded: January 13, April 25 & 27, 1955
- Genre: Jazz
- Length: 34:17
- Label: Verve
- Producer: Norman Granz

Bud Powell chronology
Time Waits (1958)	The Lonely One... (1959)	The Scene Changes (1959)

The Lonely One... is a studio album by jazz pianist Bud Powell, released in 1959 by Verve. It contains three sessions that Powell recorded at Fine Sound Studios in New York in 1955.

The album was released as a CD replica by Verve (Japan) in 2006 (POCJ-2742). The sessions (with alternate takes) are also available on The Complete Bud Powell on Verve (1994) CD box-set.

== History ==
The first three tracks here, with the four tracks that appeared on Piano Interpretations, complete the April 27 session as far as master takes go. "Willow Weep for Me" from the April 25 session had already appeared on Piano Interpretations.

== Reception ==
Professional ratings
Review scores
Source	Rating
AllMusic	4.5/5 stars
Billboard	3/4 stars
DownBeat	3/5 stars
The Virgin Encyclopedia of Jazz	3/5 stars

The January 13 session has excited comment:

the most striking cut is the session's first. On "Mediocre," Powell plays a repetitive melody over a descending series of chords for about three minutes, making increasingly outré variations on the melody rather than soloing over the chords. Slyly humorous, in the manner of Monk, for the first minute or so, the descending chords become increasingly disjointed and mechanical as the record progresses.

A DownBeat reviewer remarked, "One of Powell's marked characteristics is his penchant for the unexpected—whether it be chord, arpeggio, or twisted line. This is no less true here," noting in particular the composition "Mediocre" because "Powell strides like Fats Waller in the left hand while paving tribute to Thelonious Monk in the right."

A writer for Billboard stated: "the disk reveals some of Powell's remarkable piano work and some of his inconsistencies as well... A most interesting platter for the many Powell fans."

== Track listing 12" LP (MGV 8301) ==
All compositions by Bud Powell unless otherwise noted

Side A

1. "Confirmation" (Charlie Parker) – 4:24
2. "Star Eyes" (Gene De Paul, Don Raye) – 3:32
3. "Lullaby in Rhythm" (Clarence Profit, Edgar Sampson, Benny Goodman, Walter Hirsch) – 3:53
4. "Willow Weep for Me" (Ann Ronnell) – 4:43
5. "Mediocre" – 2:59

Side B

1. "All the Things You Are" (Jerome Kern, Oscar Hammerstein II) – 3:33
2. "Epistrophy" (Thelonious Monk, Kenny Clarke) – 3:03
3. "Dance of the Infidels" – 2:21
4. "Salt Peanuts" (Dizzy Gillespie, Clarke) – 2:22
5. "Hey George" (aka "Sweet Georgia Brown") (Maceo Pinkard, Kenneth Casey) – 3:27

== Personnel ==
=== Performance ===
- Bud Powell – piano

April 27, 1955, side A tracks 1–3. April 25, 1955, side A track 4. Fine Sound Studios, New York.

- George Duvivier – bass
- Art Taylor – drums

January 13, 1955, side A track 5 and side B tracks 1–5. Fine Sound Studios, New York.

- Percy Heath – bass
- Kenny Clarke – drums

=== Production ===
- Norman Granz – producer
- Sheldon Marks – art director
- Howard Morehead – cover photo
