= Remembering Bud Powell =

Studio album by Chick Corea and Friends
- Released: February 1997
- Recorded: 1996
- Studio: Mad Hatter Recording Studios, Los Angeles, CA
- Genre: Jazz
- Length: 73:16
- Label: Stretch; SLP2-9012-1 / SCD-9012-25
- Producer: Chick Corea

Chick Corea chronology
Solo Piano: From Nothing (1996)	Remembering Bud Powell (1997)	Native Sense - The New Duets (1997)

Remembering Bud Powell is an album by pianist Chick Corea and Friends performing tunes by Bud Powell. It was released on Corea's Stretch label in 1997.

== Reception ==
Professional ratings
Review scores
Source	Rating
AllMusic	4.5/5 stars
The Penguin Guide to Jazz Recordings	3.5/4 stars
Uncut	3/5 stars

The AllMusic review by Scott Yanow said "Rather than play revivalist bebop, Corea and his associates (after authentically stating the melody) perform modern post-bop improvisations in their own styles; so much of the music is way beyond bop ... All of the talented musicians have a fair amount of solo space and sound consistently inspired, making this a very successful and easily recommended project". The Penguin Guide to Jazz Recordings describes the album as “a small triumph, an understated and affectionate album that gives a clear impression of its subject - as understood by a follower - but without succumbing to sycophancy.

In the 40th Annual Grammy Awards, this album was nominated as Best Jazz Instrumental Performance, Individual or Group.

== Track listing ==
All compositions by Bud Powell except where noted

1. "Bouncing with Bud" (Bud Powell, Walter Fuller) – 7:58
2. "Mediocre" – 8:48
3. "Willow Grove" – 9:56
4. "Dusk in Sandi" – 8:06
5. "Oblivion" – 7:14
6. "Bud Powell" (Chick Corea) – 6:20
7. "I'll Keep Loving You" – 9:06
8. "Glass Enclosure" – 3:20
9. "Tempus Fugit" – 9:28
10. "Celia" – 3:00

== Personnel ==
- Chick Corea – piano
- Wallace Roney – trumpet (tracks 1–3, 5, 6, 8 & 9)
- Kenny Garrett –alto saxophone (tracks 3, 5 & 6)
- Joshua Redman – tenor saxophone (tracks 1–3 & 7–9)
- Christian McBride – bass (tracks 1–9)
- Roy Haynes – drums (tracks 1–6, 8 & 9)
