= The Best of Bud Powell on Verve =

Greatest hits album by Bud Powell
- Released: August 23, 1994
- Recorded: 1949–1955
- Genre: Jazz
- Length: 57:22
- Label: Verve
- Producer: Norman Granz, Leroy Lovett

Bud Powell chronology
'Round About Midnight at the Blue Note (1994)	The Best of Bud Powell on Verve (1994)	The Complete Bud Powell on Verve (1994)

Professional ratings
Review scores
Source	Rating
Allmusic	4.5/5 stars
The Penguin Guide to Jazz Recordings	3.5/4 stars

The Best of Bud Powell on Verve is a selection of jazz pianist Bud Powell's recordings for Verve Records, released on August 23, 1994.

The similarly titled The Best of Bud Powell was released by Blue Note Records in 1989, and features tracks recorded from 1949 to 1963 on that label, with little overlap in song selection.

== Track listing ==
All songs were written by Bud Powell, except where noted.

1. "Lady Bird" (Tadd Dameron) – 4:44
2. "Dance of the Infidels" – 2:16
3. "So Sorry, Please" – 3:14
4. "Sweet Georgia Brown" (Maceo Pinkard, Kenneth Casey) – 2:48
5. "Willow Grove" (aka "Willow Groove") – 4:27
6. "Tempus Fugue-it" (aka "Tempus Fugit") – 2:25
7. "It Never Entered My Mind" (Richard Rodgers, Lorenz Hart) – 2:56
8. "Bean and the Boys" (Contrafact of "Lover Come Back to Me") (Coleman Hawkins) – 3:38
9. "Celia" – 2:57
10. "Tea for Two" [78 take (take 10)] (Vincent Youmans, Irving Caesar) – 3:46
11. "Star Eyes" (Gene De Paul, Don Raye) – 3:28
12. "April in Paris" (Vernon Duke, E.Y. "Yip" Harburg) – 3:08
13. "Tenderly" (Walter Gross, Jack Lawrence) – 3:15
14. "All God's Chillun Got Rhythm" (Bronislaw Kaper, Gus Kahn, Walter Jurmann) – 2:59
15. "Stairway to the Stars" (Matty Malneck, Frank Signorelli, Mitchell Parish) – 4:58
16. "Just One of Those Things" (Cole Porter) – 3:50
17. "Parisian Thoroughfare" (aka "Parisienne Thorofare") – 2:28

== Personnel ==
=== Performance ===
Bud Powell plays piano on all tracks.

April 27, 1955, tracks 1, 11, 15. April 25, 1955, track 5.

- George Duvivier – bass
- Art Taylor – drums

January 13, 1955, track 2.

- Percy Heath – bass
- Kenny Clarke – drums

February 1950, tracks 3, 4, 12.

- Curly Russell – bass
- Max Roach – drums

February 23, 1949, tracks 6, 10, 14.

- Ray Brown – bass
- Max Roach – drums

June 4, 1954, track 7.

- Percy Heath – bass
- Art Taylor – drums

January 11, 1955, tracks 8, 13.

- Lloyd Trotman – bass
- Art Blakey – drums

July 1, 1950, track 9.

- Ray Brown – bass
- Buddy Rich – drums

February, 1951, tracks 16–17 – Powell solos.

=== Production ===
- Norman Granz – producer
- Max Harrison – liner notes
- Leroy Lovett – producer
