= My Long Yellow Road =

Studio album by Toshiko Akiyoshi
- Released: 6 December 2017
- Recorded: 6, 7 September 2017
- Venue: New York City
- Studio: Sear Sound Studio 'C', New York City
- Genre: Jazz
- Label: Studio Songs
- Producer: Toshiko Akiyoshi, Tetsuya Iwasaki

Toshiko Akiyoshi chronology
Toshiko Akiyoshi Plays Gershwin's Porgy And Bess (2016)	My Long Yellow Road (2017)	The Eternal Duo! (2019)

My Long Yellow Road is a (mostly) solo studio recording by jazz pianist Toshiko Akiyoshi.

== Track listing ==
Disc 1

1. "Long Yellow Road" (Akiyoshi)
2. "I Loves You Porgy" (Gershwin)
3. "No Moon at All" (Mann, Evans)
4. "Invention In 2 Voices in D Minor" (Bach)
5. "Count Your Blessings Instead Of Sheep" (Berlin)
6. "Repose" (Akiyoshi)
7. "That Old Devil Moon" (Harburg, Lane)
8. "Polka Dots and Moonbeams" (Burke, Van Heusen)
9. "Tempus Fugit" (Powell)

Disc 2

1. "I'm Old Fashioned" (Kern, Mercer)
2. "Desert Moon" (Sasaki)
3. "It Was a Very Good Year" (Drake)
4. "Memory" (Akiyoshi)
5. "Sophisticated Lady" (Ellington, Mills, Parish)
6. "The Village" (Akiyoshi)
7. "Feast In Milano" (Akiyoshi)
8. "Hope" (Akiyoshi)
9. "Ten Ten" (Akiyoshi)

== Personnel ==
- Toshiko Akiyoshi – piano
- Yasushi Nakamura - bass (on tracks 1-3, 1-8, 2-1, 2-2)
