= The Genius of Bud Powell =

Studio album by Bud Powell
- Released: 1956
- Recorded: July 1, 1950, February 1951
- Genre: Jazz
- Length: 38:07
- Label: Mercury / Clef
- Producer: Norman Granz

Bud Powell chronology
Jazz Original (1955)	The Genius of Bud Powell (1956)	The Amazing Bud Powell, Vols. 1 & 2 (1956)

Professional ratings
Review scores
Source	Rating
Allmusic	5/5 stars
The Rolling Stone Jazz Record Guide	5/5 stars

The Genius of Bud Powell, originally titled Bud Powell's Moods, is a studio album by jazz pianist Bud Powell, released in 1956 by Mercury / Clef, featuring two sessions that Powell recorded in 1950 and 1951.

The album was re-released on CD by Verve in 1992, with two additional takes of "Tea for Two". The sessions also appear on The Complete Bud Powell on Verve (1994) box set.

== History ==
The two sessions mark Powell's fourth recording date as leader, following on from the February 1950 session for Jazz Giant.

The three takes of "Tea for Two" at the start of the CD release recall the 1955 LP release of The Amazing Bud Powell, which opens with three takes of "Un Poco Loco".

Powell's composition "Parisian Thoroughfare", a "classic bop vehicle", has been recorded by several other artists, most notably the Clifford Brown and Max Roach quintet in 1954 (Clifford Brown & Max Roach), featuring Bud's brother Richie Powell on piano.

== Track listing ==
All songs were written by Bud Powell, except where noted.

1. "Tea for Two" [take 5] (Vincent Youmans, Irving Caesar) – 3:28 (not on original LP)
2. "Tea for Two" [take 6] (Youmans, Caesar) – 4:13
3. "Tea for Two" [take 10] (Youmans, Caesar) – 3:47 (not on original LP)
4. "Hallelujah!" (Youmans, Leo Robin, Clifford Grey) – 2:59
5. "Parisian Thoroughfare" (a.k.a. "Parisienne Thorofare") – 2:28
6. "Oblivion" – 2:28
7. "Dusk in Sandi" (a.k.a. "Dusky 'n' Sandy") – 2:13
8. "Hallucinations" (a.k.a. "Budo") – 2:25
9. "The Fruit" – 3:17
10. "A Nightingale Sang in Berkeley Square" (Manning Sherwin, Jack Strachey, Eric Maschwitz) – 3:41
11. "Just One of Those Things" (Cole Porter) – 3:50
12. "The Last Time I Saw Paris" (Jerome Kern, Oscar Hammerstein II) – 3:18

== Personnel ==
July 1, 1950, New York, tracks 1–4.

- Bud Powell – piano
- Ray Brown – bass
- Buddy Rich – drums

February 1951, New York, tracks 5–12.

- Bud Powell – piano (solo)

== Release history ==
The album was originally released as the 12" LP Bud Powell's Moods (Mercury / Clef MGC 610), and later re-released and re-titled The Genius of Bud Powell (Clef MGC 739, Verve MGV 8115). Confusingly, another album containing different sessions (from 1954 and 1955) was subsequently released as Bud Powell's Moods (Norgran MGN 1064). Confusingly again, in the late 1970s Verve released a double LP also called The Genius of Bud Powell, coupling the single-disc Genius with Jazz Giant, and also a follow-up double LP called The Genius of Bud Powell, Volume 2, containing sessions from 1954 to 1956.

On the CD release, the additional version of "Tea for Two" marked "take 5" (a.k.a. "compilation take") had previously been released in the 50s on a V.A. compilation called Piano Interpretations. The version marked "take 10" (a.k.a. "78 take") had appeared on 78/45 rpm singles and on the 10" LP Piano Solos #2.

=== Bud Powell's Moods 12" LP (MGC 610) ===
Bud Powell's Moods 12" LP (Mercury / Clef)

1. "Parisienne Thorofare" – 2:28
2. "Oblivion" – 2:28
3. "Dusk in Sandi" – 2:13
4. "Hallucinations" – 2:25
5. "The Fruit" – 3:17
1. "Tea for Two" [take 6] (Youmans, Caesar) – 4:13
2. "Hallelujah!" (Youmans, Robin, Grey) – 2:59
3. "The Last Time I Saw Paris" (Kern, Hammerstein II) – 3:18
4. "Just One of Those Things" (Porter) – 3:50
5. "A Nightingale Sang in Berkeley Square" (Sherwin, Strachey, Maschwitz) – 3:41
