= Piano Interpretations by Bud Powell =

Studio album by Bud Powell
- Released: 1956
- Recorded: April 25 & 27, 1955
- Genre: Jazz
- Length: 38:26
- Label: Norgran
- Producer: Norman Granz

Bud Powell chronology
Bud Powell's Moods (1956)	Piano Interpretations by Bud Powell (1956)	Bud Powell Trio (1957)

Professional ratings
Review scores
Source	Rating
AllMusic	4.5/5 stars
The Rolling Stone Jazz Record Guide	5/5 stars
DownBeat	4.5/5 stars

Piano Interpretations by Bud Powell is a studio album by jazz pianist Bud Powell, released in 1956 by Norgran, featuring two sessions that Powell recorded at Fine Sound Studios in New York in April 1955.

The album was re-issued on LP by Verve (MGV 8167), and released as a CD replica by Verve (Japan) in 2006 (POCJ-2743). The sessions (with alternate takes) are also available on The Complete Bud Powell on Verve (1994) CD box set.

== History ==
The album presents the April 25 master takes in full, apart from "Bean and the Boys" (the version here is from April 27). The April 27 session is split between this album and The Lonely One....

The version of "Willow Grove" on the Piano Interpretations album is a different tune than the original tune of the same title, composed by Powell and fellow bebop pianist Walter Davis Jr. during and shortly after his time at Creedmoor Hospital. Powell had forgotten the original following electroshock therapy and wrote the new version of the tune at the studio.

DownBeat's critics praised the album, praising Taylor and Duvivier and noting about Powell personally, "[T]his is one of Bud’s better sets in the last couple of years and indicates what is finally being realized by some of those who have control over him—that Bud is in increasing control over himself, and that it is no longer necessarily true that the best of Bud is behind him."

== Track listing 12" LP (MGN 1077, MGV 8167) ==
1. "Conception" (Powell, George Shearing) – 3:36
2. "East of the Sun (and West of the Moon)" (Brooks Bowman) – 3:55
3. "Heart and Soul" (Hoagy Carmichael, Frank Loesser) – 3:18
4. "Willow Groove" (a.k.a. "Willow Grove") (Powell, Walter Davis Jr.) – 4:25
5. "Crazy Rhythm" (Joseph Meyer, Roger Wolfe Kahn, Irving Caesar) – 3:36
1. "Willow Weep for Me" (Ann Ronell) – 4:43
2. "Bean and the Boys" (Coleman Hawkins) (contrafact of "Lover Come Back to Me") – 5:14
3. "Lady Bird" (Tadd Dameron) – 4:44
4. "Stairway to the Stars" (Matty Malneck, Frank Signorelli, Mitchell Parish) – 4:55

== Personnel ==
=== Performance ===
April 25, 1955, side A tracks 1, 3–5 and side B track 1. April 27, 1955, side A track 2 and side B tracks 2–4. Fine Sound Studios, New York.

- Bud Powell – piano
- George Duvivier – bass
- Art Taylor – drums

=== Production ===
- Norman Granz – producer
- David Stone Martin – cover design
