= List of 1940s jazz standards =

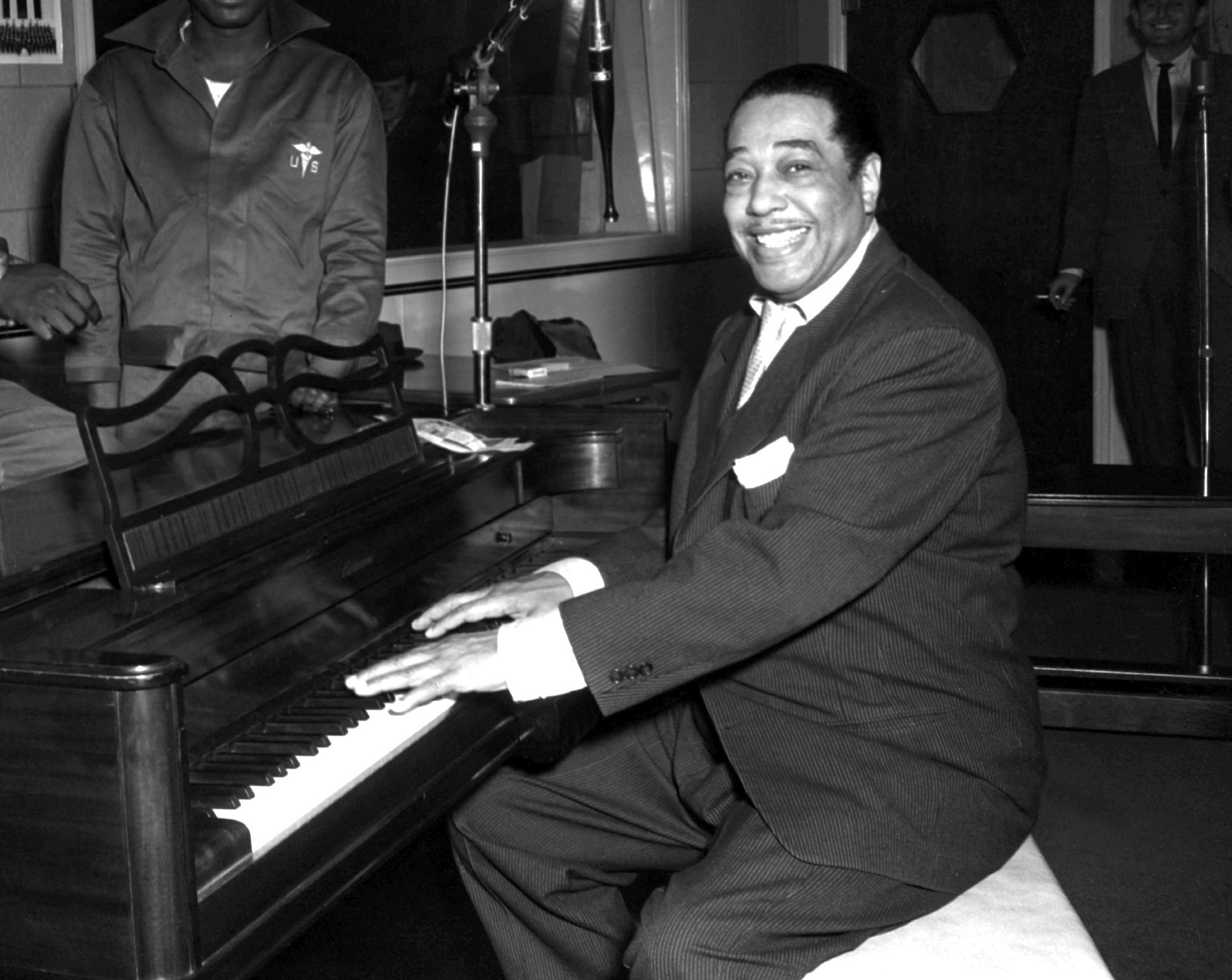
Duke Ellington was one of the most influential jazz composers. His numerous standards include "Sophisticated Lady" (1933), "In a Sentimental Mood" (1935), "Cotton Tail" (1940), and "Satin Doll" (1953).

Jazz standards are musical compositions that are widely known, performed, and recorded by jazz artists as part of the genre's musical repertoire. This list includes tunes written in the 1940s that are considered standards by at least one major fake book publication or reference work.

The swing era lasted until the mid-1940s, and produced popular tunes such as Duke Ellington's "Cotton Tail" (1940) and Billy Strayhorn's "Take the 'A' Train" (1941). When the big bands struggled to keep going during World War II, a shift was happening in jazz in favor of smaller groups. Some swing era musicians, like Louis Jordan, later found popularity in a new kind of music, called "rhythm and blues", that would evolve into rock and roll in the 1950s.

Bebop emerged in the early 1940s, led by Charlie Parker, Dizzy Gillespie, Thelonious Monk, and others. It appealed to a more specialized audience than earlier forms of jazz, with sophisticated harmonies, fast tempos, and often virtuoso musicianship. Bebop musicians often used 1930s standards, especially those from Broadway musicals, as part of their repertoire. Among standards written by bebop musicians are Gillespie's "Salt Peanuts" (1941) and "A Night in Tunisia" (1942), Parker's "Anthropology" (1946), "Yardbird Suite" (1946) and "Scrapple from the Apple" (1947), and Monk's "'Round Midnight" (1944), which is currently the most recorded jazz standard composed by a jazz musician.

== 1940 ==
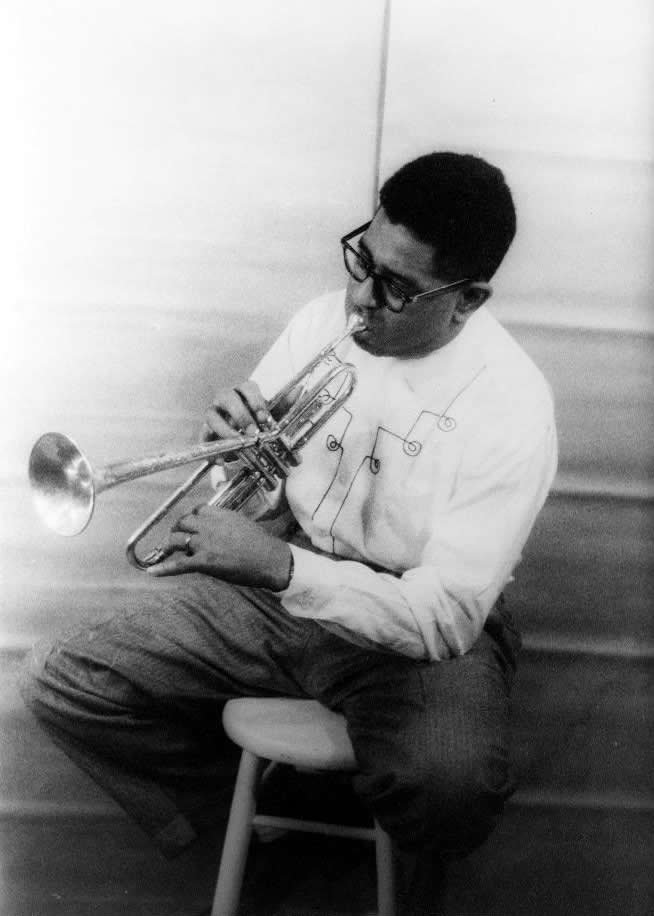
Trumpeter Dizzy Gillespie was one of the leading figures of bebop. Standards composed by him include "A Night in Tunisia" (1942), "Woody N' You" (1942), and "Groovin' High" (1944).

- "After Hours" is a song composed by Avery Parrish with lyrics by Robert Bruce and Buddy Feyne. Parrish's own hit instrumental version, featuring him on piano with the Erskine Hawkins Orchestra, was recorded on June 10, 1940. Lyrics were added later.
- "All Too Soon" is a jazz ballad composed by Duke Ellington with lyrics by Carl Sigman. Tenor saxophonist Ben Webster's performance on the tune was so highly regarded by audiences that his successors in the band were asked how they dare sit on Webster's seat. Webster later recorded the tune with young Sarah Vaughan in 1946.
- "Cotton Tail" is a swing jazz composition by Duke Ellington, with lyrics later added by Jon Hendricks. It was based on the Rhythm changes, a chord progression later used as a basis for many bebop tunes. Ben Webster was often asked by audiences to play his famous tenor saxophone solo note for note. The name of the tune is sometimes spelled as "Cottontail".
- "Do Nothing till You Hear from Me" (a.k.a. "Concerto for Cootie") is a song composed by Duke Ellington with lyrics by Bob Russell.
- "Don't Get Around Much Anymore" is a song composed by Duke Ellington with lyrics by Bob Russell.
- "How High the Moon" is a song composed by Morgan Lewis with lyrics by Nancy Hamilton. Among the many takes by jazz instrumentalists there are two vocal renditions which made their way, the classic Ella Fitzgerald live performance, and Sarah Vaughan's rendition.
- "In a Mellow Tone" (a.k.a. "In a Mellotone") is a song composed by Duke Ellington with lyrics by Milt Gabler.
- "Polka Dots and Moonbeams" is a song composed by Jimmy Van Heusen with lyrics by Johnny Burke.
- "You Stepped Out of a Dream" is a song composed by Nacio Herb Brown with lyrics by Gus Kahn.

== 1941 ==
- "Aquarela do Brasil" (a.k.a. "Brazil") is a song composed by Ary Barroso with lyrics by S. K. Russell. This is originally a samba from Brazil, which made its way in America and was sung by Carmen Miranda as well as by Frank Sinatra in his album Come Fly with Me, with arrangements by Billy May for Capitol Records.
- "Blues in the Night" is a song composed by Harold Arlen, with lyrics by Johnny Mercer. It was written for the 1941 film of the same name. Jazz-oriented artists who recorded the song include Woody Herman, Jimmie Lunceford, Artie Shaw, Louis Armstrong, Cab Calloway, Frank Sinatra, Jo Stafford (both solo and with lyricist Johnny Mercer and the Pied Pipers), Ella Fitzgerald, Benny Goodman, and Mel Torme, among many others.
- "Chelsea Bridge" is a song written by Billy Strayhorn.
- "Flamingo" is a song composed by Ted Grouya with lyrics by Edmund Anderson.
- "I Got It Bad (and That Ain't Good)" is a song composed by Duke Ellington with lyrics by Paul Francis Webster.
- "I Hear A Rhapsody" written by George Fragos, Jack Baker, and Dick Gasparre.
- "I'll Remember April" is a song composed by Gene de Paul with lyrics by Patricia Johnston and Don Raye.
- "Jim" is a song with music by James Caesar Petrillo and Milton Samuels (who also used the pseudonym Edward Ross), lyrics by Nelson Shawn. Jazz-oriented artists who recorded the song include Ella Fitzgerald, Sarah Vaughn, Dinah Shore, Billy Holiday, Etta James, and Aretha Franklin.
- "Just A-Sittin' and A-Rockin'" is a song composed by Duke Ellington and Billy Strayhorn, with lyrics by Lee Gaines.
- "Just Squeeze Me (But Please Don't Tease Me)" is a song composed by Duke Ellington with lyrics by Lee Gaines.
- "Salt Peanuts" is a jazz composition by Kenny Clarke and Dizzy Gillespie.
- "Take the 'A' Train" is a song written by Billy Strayhorn.
- "Why Don't You Do Right?" is a blues song by Kansas Joe McCoy. Originally titled "The Weed Smoker's Dream", McCoy rewrote the lyrics for Lil Green, who recorded it with Big Bill Broonzy in 1941. Peggy Lee recorded a hit version with Benny Goodman in 1945; this version was performed in Who Framed Roger Rabbit by Jessica Rabbit at the Ink and Paint Club.
- "You Don't Know What Love Is" is a song written by Gene De Paul and Don Raye.

== 1942 ==
- "C Jam Blues" (a.k.a. "Duke's Place") is a song written by Duke Ellington.
- "Epistrophy" is a song composed by Thelonious Monk and Kenny Clarke.
- "Lover Man (Oh, Where Can You Be?)" is a song written by Jimmy Davis, Ram Ramirez and Jimmy Sherman. It is associated with the definitive Billie Holiday's rendition.
- "A Night in Tunisia" is a song composed by Dizzy Gillespie and Frank Paparelli with lyrics by Jon Hendricks.
- "Perdido" is a song composed by Juan Tizol with lyrics by Ervin Drake and Hans Jan Lengsfelder.
- "Skylark" is a song composed by Hoagy Carmichael with lyrics by Johnny Mercer.
- "That Old Black Magic" is a song composed by Harold Arlen, with lyrics by Johnny Mercer. Jazz-oriented artists who recorded it include Glenn Miller, Judy Garland, Louis Prima and Keely Smith, and the Freddie Slack Orchestra featuring Margaret Whiting on vocals.
- "There Will Never Be Another You" is a song composed by Harry Warren with lyrics by Mack Gordon.
- "Things Ain't What They Used to Be" is a song composed by Mercer Ellington with lyrics by Ted Persons.
- "Que reste-t-il de nos amours" (a.k.a. "I Wish You Love") is a song composed by Léo Chauliac and Charles Trenet with original French lyrics by Charles Trenet and English version by Albert Askew Beach in 1957.
- "Woody 'n' You" (a.k.a. "Algo Bueno") is a jazz composition by Dizzy Gillespie.

== 1943 ==
- "Harlem Nocturne" is a song composed by Earle Hagen with lyrics by Dick Rogers.
- "Star Eyes" is a song from the film I Dood It, written by Gene de Paul and Don Raye. It was introduced by Helen O'Connell and Bob Eberly in the film and became popular among jazz artists after Charlie Parker's 1951 recording.
- "The Surrey with the Fringe on Top" is a song composed by Richard Rodgers with lyrics by Oscar Hammerstein II.

== 1944 ==
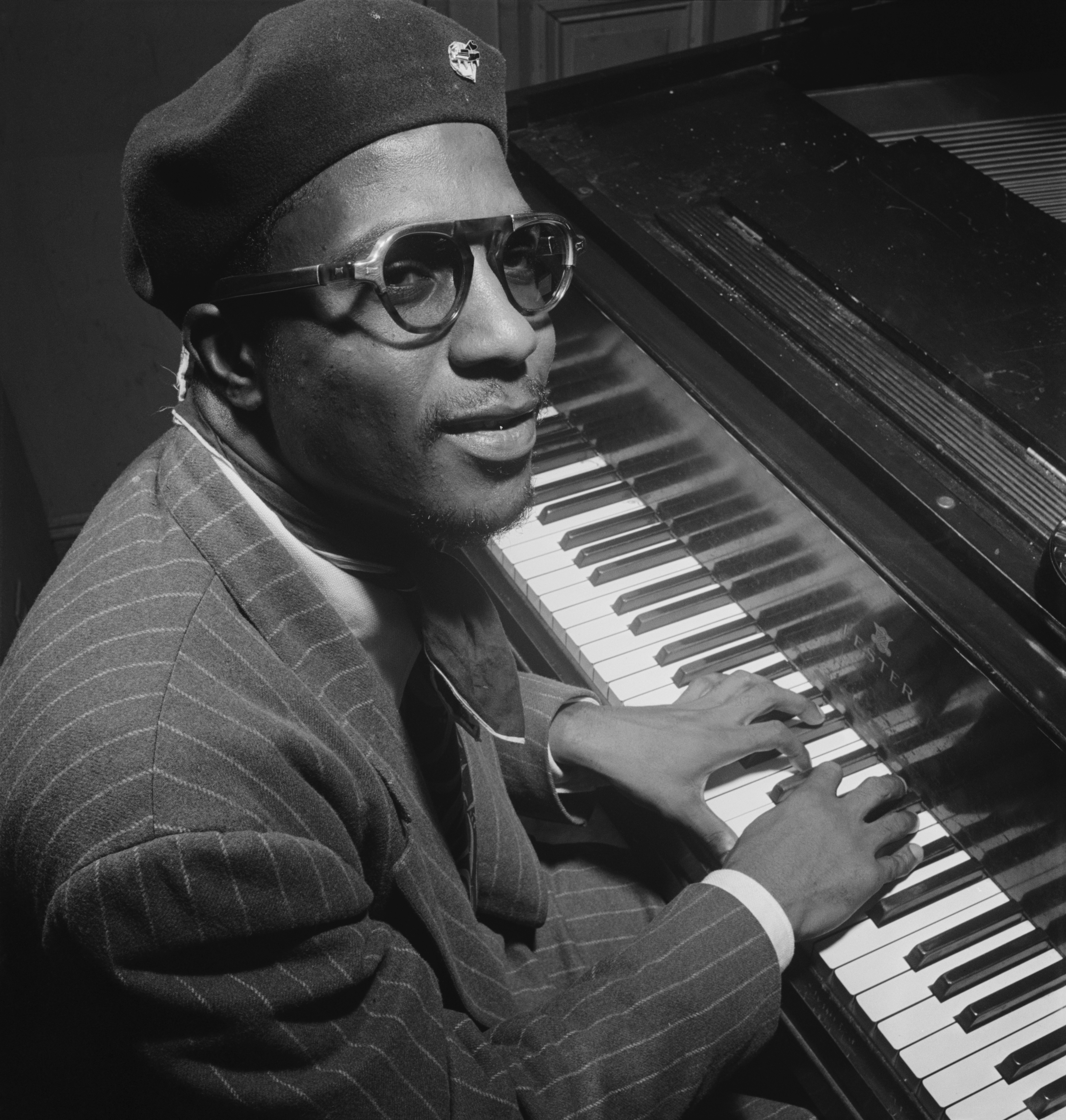
Thelonious Monk composed the most popular standard written by a jazz musician, "'Round Midnight" (1944). His other standards include "Well, You Needn't" (1944), "Straight, No Chaser" (1951) and "Blue Monk" (1954).

- "Ev'ry Time We Say Goodbye" is a song written by Cole Porter.
- "Groovin' High" is a jazz composition by Dizzy Gillespie.
- "I Fall in Love Too Easily" is a song composed by Jule Styne with lyrics by Sammy Cahn.
- "I Should Care" is a song written by Sammy Cahn, Axel Stordahl and Paul Weston.
- "It Could Happen to You" is a song composed by Jimmy Van Heusen with lyrics by Johnny Burke. This song's harmony was base to another composition titled 'Fried Bananas' written by saxophonist Dexter Gordon.
- "Long Ago (and Far Away)" is a song composed by Jerome Kern with lyrics by Ira Gershwin.
- "'Round Midnight" (a.k.a. "'Round About Midnight") is a song composed by Thelonious Monk and Cootie Williams with lyrics by Bernie Hanighen.
- "Stella by Starlight" is a song composed by Victor Young with lyrics by Ned Washington. The song was written for the 1944 Paramount film “The Uninvited.”
- "Well, You Needn't (It's Over Now)" is a song composed by Thelonious Monk with lyrics by Mike Ferro.

== 1945 ==
- "Billie's Bounce" (a.k.a. "Bill's Bounce") is a jazz composition by Charlie Parker.
- "Everything but You" is a song composed by Duke Ellington and Harry James with lyrics by Don George.
- "Hot House" is a jazz composition by Tadd Dameron.
- "I'm Just a Lucky So-and-So" is a song composed by Duke Ellington with lyrics by Mack David.
- "It Might as Well Be Spring" is a song composed by Richard Rodgers with lyrics by Oscar Hammerstein II.
- "Laura" is a song composed by David Raksin for the film of the same title. Lyrics were penned later by Johnny Mercer and the vocal renditions by Frank Sinatra and by Johnny Mathis, with arrangement by Don Costa, became classic along with several jazz instrumental renditions.
- "Now's the Time" is a jazz composition by Charlie Parker.
- "Since I Fell for You" is a song written by Buddy Johnson.
- "I'll Close My Eyes" is a song written by Billy Reid.

== 1946 ==
- "Angel Eyes" is a song composed by Matt Dennis with lyrics by Earl K. Brent, it is associated with Frank Sinatra "saloon" rendition.
- "Anthropology" is a jazz composition by Dizzy Gillespie and Charlie Parker.
- "Come Rain or Come Shine" is a song composed by Harold Arlen with lyrics by Johnny Mercer.
- "Confirmation" is a jazz composition by Charlie Parker.
- "Day Dream" is a song composed by Duke Ellington and Billy Strayhorn with lyrics by John La Touche.
- "Do You Know What It Means to Miss New Orleans" is a song composed by Louis Alter with lyrics by Eddie DeLange.
- "If You Could See Me Now" is a song composed by Tadd Dameron with lyrics by Carl Sigman.
- "Nobody Else But Me" is a song composed by Jerome Kern with lyrics by Oscar Hammerstein II.
- "Ornithology" is a jazz composition by Charlie Parker and Bennie Harris.
- "Tenderly" is a song composed by pianist Walter Gross with lyrics by Jack Lawrence.
- "The Things We Did Last Summer" is a song composed by Jule Styne with lyrics by Sammy Cahn.
- "Yardbird Suite" is a jazz composition by Charlie Parker.

== 1947 ==
- "Autumn Leaves" (originally "Les feuilles mortes") is a song composed by Joseph Kosma with original French lyrics by Jacques Prévert and English version by Johnny Mercer.
- "But Beautiful" is a song composed by Jimmy Van Heusen with lyrics by Johnny Burke.
- "C'est si bon" is a song composed by Henri Betti with original French lyrics by André Hornez and English version by Jerry Seelen in 1949.
- "Donna Lee" is a jazz composition by Charlie Parker.
- "In Walked Bud" is a song composed by Thelonious Monk. The song had lyrics written by Jon Hendricks who has recorded it with the composer in Monk's album titled Underground (Columbia Records).
- "Lady Bird" is a jazz composition by Tadd Dameron.
- "Nature Boy" is a song written by eden ahbez.
- "On Green Dolphin Street" is a song composed by Bronislaw Kaper with lyrics by Ned Washington. Main theme (instrumental) for the film 'Green Dolphin' which was retrieved by Miles Davis with great success.
- "Our Delight" is a jazz composition by Tadd Dameron.
- "Scrapple from the Apple" is a jazz composition by Charlie Parker. It was based on the chord progression of Fats Waller's "Honeysuckle Rose".

== 1948 ==
- "Detour Ahead" is a jazz composition with words and music credited to Herb Ellis, John Frigo, and Lou Carter. Probably most famously recorded by Billie Holiday in 1951 with Tiny Grimes.
- "Four Brothers" is a jazz composition by Jimmy Giuffre.
- "The Night Has a Thousand Eyes" is a song composed by Jerry Brainin, with lyrics by Buddy Bernier.

== 1949 ==
- "Lush Life" is a song written by Billy Strayhorn.
- "My Foolish Heart" is a song composed by Victor Young with lyrics by Ned Washington.

== Bibliography ==
=== Reference works ===
- Büchmann-Møller, Frank (2006). Someone to Watch over Me: The Life and Music of Ben Webster. University of Michigan Press. ISBN 0-472-11470-0.
- Crouch, Stanley (2007). Considering Genius: Writings on Jazz. Basic Books. ISBN 978-0-465-01512-2.
- Herzhaft, Gérard; Harris, Paul; Debord, Brigitte; Haussler, Jerry; Mikofsky, Anton J. (1997). Encyclopedia of the Blues. University of Arkansas Press. ISBN 978-1-55728-452-5.

=== Fake books ===
- The New Real Book, Volume I. Sher Music. 1988. ISBN 0-9614701-4-3.
- The New Real Book, Volume II. Sher Music. 1991. ISBN 0-9614701-7-8.
- The New Real Book, Volume III. Sher Music. 1995. ISBN 1-883217-30-X.
- The Real Book, Volume I (6th ed.). Hal Leonard. 2004. ISBN 0-634-06038-4.
- The Real Book, Volume II (2nd ed.). Hal Leonard. 2007. ISBN 978-1-4234-2452-9.
- The Real Book, Volume III (2nd ed.). Hal Leonard. 2006. ISBN 0-634-06136-4.
- The Real Jazz Book. Warner Bros. ISBN 978-91-85041-36-7.
- The Real Vocal Book, Volume I. Hal Leonard. 2006. ISBN 0-634-06080-5.
