= Bud in Paris =

Live album by Bud Powell
- Released: 1975
- Recorded: 12 December 1959, 14 February 1960, 12 March 1960, 15 June 1960, 14 October 1960
- Genre: Jazz
- Length: 49:04
- Label: Xanadu
- Producer: Don Schlitten

Bud Powell chronology
| Ups 'n Downs (1973) | Bud in Paris (1975) | One Night in Birdland (1977) |

Professional ratings
Review scores
| Source | Rating |
|---|---|
| Allmusic | 3/5 stars |
| DownBeat | 4/5 stars |

Bud in Paris is an album by jazz pianist Bud Powell, originally released on Xanadu Records in 1975, containing non-studio recordings made of Powell in Paris between December 1959 and October 1960. It is not to be confused with the 1964 Reprise recording, Bud Powell in Paris.

The first session on the disc (tracks 1–2), from 14 February 1960, is a duet between Powell and Johnny Griffin on tenor. The next session (tracks 3–6), from 12 December 1959, features Barney Wilen on tenor with Powell, Pierre Michelot (bass), and Kenny Clarke (drums). The exact locations in Paris for these dates are unknown.

The last seven tracks (7–13) with Powell, Michelot and Clarke, are from three separate dates in 1960: tracks 7–10 from 14 October, track 11 from 12 March, and tracks 12–13 from 15 June. The October date was recorded at the Théâtre des Champs-Élysées, and the two last dates were recorded at the Blue Note Café. The June tracks also appear on Earl Bud Powell, Vol. 5: Groovin' at the Blue Note, 59-61 (Mythic Sound).

== Reception ==
John McDonough of DownBeat wrote, "The tempos are quick, but Bud never falters. His darting invention and spiraling tangents are executed with grace, drive and precision. Few of Powell's fans are likely to be disappointed by the heights he attains here."

== Track listing ==
Except where otherwise noted, all songs composed by Bud Powell.

1. "Idaho" (Jesse Stone) – 6:58
2. "Perdido" (Juan Tizol, Ervin Drake, H. J. Lengsfelder) – 5:26
3. "Shaw 'Nuff" (Ray Brown, Gil Fuller, Dizzy Gillespie) – 2:46
4. "Oleo" (Sonny Rollins) – 2:11
5. "Autumn in New York" (Vernon Duke) – 4:10
6. "John's Abbey" – 2:39
7. "John's Abbey" – 4:08
8. "Buttercup" – 5:20
9. "Sweet and Lovely" (Gus Arnheim, Jules LeMare, Harry Tobias) – 3:23
10. "Crossin' the Channel" – 4:15
11. "Confirmation" (Charlie Parker) – 2:25
12. "Get Happy" (Harold Arlen, Ted Koehler) – 2:38
13. "John's Abbey" – 2:15

== Personnel ==
=== Performance ===
- Bud Powell – piano
- Johnny Griffin – tenor sax (tracks 1–2 only)
- Barney Wilen – tenor sax (tracks 3–6 only)
- Pierre Michelot – bass (except tracks 1–2)
- Kenny Clarke – drums (except tracks 1–2)

=== Production ===
- Don Schlitten – producer, photography
- Mark Gardner – liner notes
- Paul Goodman – remastering
