= Midnight at Minton's =

Live album by Don Byas
- Released: 1973
- Recorded: 1941
- Genre: Jazz
- Length: 38:51
- Label: High Note Records
- Producer: Don Schlitten

Don Byas chronology
Midnight at Minton's (1973)	A Tribute to Cannonball (1979)

Professional ratings
Review scores
Source	Rating
AllMusic	4.5/5 stars
The Penguin Guide to Jazz Recordings	3/4 stars

Midnight at Minton's is an album by jazz musician Don Byas, first released in 1973. It is a live recording of a 1941 jam session at Minton's Playhouse, the New York City nightclub at which the emerging style of bebop was being pioneered.

It features one of the earliest known recordings of Thelonious Monk, who was then playing piano in Minton's house band.

The album is taken from private recordings made by Columbia University student Jerry Newman on a portable acetate disc recorder. Newman made the recordings for "Delayed on Disc" broadcasts on college radio station WKCR — the discs were rushed back to the radio studio shortly after being cut and presented in the style of a live broadcast from the venue.

In a review for AllMusic, Michael G. Nastos concludes that, "the music itself is priceless, the document of a transitional period from swing to bop, and some of the people that made it happen, especially the underappreciated genius Byas."

== Track listing ==
1. "Stardust" (Hoagy Carmichael, Mitchell Parish) – 9:04
2. "Exactly Like You" (Dorothy Fields, Jimmy McHugh) – 9:03
3. "Uptown" (Don Byas) – 2:45
4. "Body and Soul" (Edward Heyman, Robert Sour, Frank Eyton, Johnny Green) – 7:29
5. "I Can't Give You Anything But Love" (Fields, McHugh) – 4:07
6. "(Back Home Again in) Indiana" (James F. Hanley, Ballard MacDonald) – 6:23

== Personnel ==
- Don Byas – tenor saxophone
- Joe Guy – trumpet
- Thelonious Monk – piano
- Milt Hinton – bass (uncredited in liner notes)
- Kenny Clarke – drums
- Helen Humes – vocals (1,2)

== Similar albums ==
- Live at Minton's – Musidisc 30 JA 5121 (France, LP)
- Midnight at Minton's – Onyx ORI 208 (LP)
- Midnight at Minton's – Polydor 2310341 (LP)
