= Ups 'n Downs (album) =

Studio album by Bud Powell
- Released: 1973
- Genre: Jazz
- Length: 36:52
- Label: Mainstream

Bud Powell chronology
A Portrait of Thelonious (1965)	Ups 'n Downs (1973)	Bud in Paris (1975)

Ups 'n Downs is an album by jazz pianist Bud Powell, and the last recorded album prior to his death. At the time of recording, believed to be 1964 and early 1965, Powell had returned to New York City after living in Paris for several years. The album has been noted for its mysterious recording circumstances and misleading liner notes.

== History ==
All the tracks for the album were recorded after Powell returned to New York in 1964 and before his death in 1966. The album's accompanying liner notes written by Nat Hentoff inaccurately claimed it was recorded during the mid-1950s.

Powell participated in multiple studio sessions from 1964 to 1966, but most were not issued due to his ill health and advancing tuberculosis. What is known is that drummer J. C. Moses participated in some of the sessions, and that bassist Scotty Holt and drummer Rashied Ali participated in at least one session in 1966. Some of the tapes from these sessions were destroyed.

Adding to the confusion, Horace Silver, who composed "No Smokin'," one of the tracks on the album, claimed that Powell "never got the chance to do it" on record or in public. Ira Gitler claimed the Silver composition was played at the same March 1965 Carnegie Hall concert where "'Round Midnight" was played, although it is unclear whether the live version was the one included on the album.

== Critical reception ==
Professional ratings
Review scores
Source	Rating
Allmusic	2/5 stars
The Rolling Stone Jazz Record Guide	2/5 stars
The Virgin Encyclopedia of Jazz	3/5 stars

Jazz critic Scott Yanow noted: Powell "plays better than one might expect. The bassist and drummer have never been identified. This set is important historically but obviously there are many more rewarding Bud Powell recordings to acquire first."

The Rolling Stone Jazz Record Guide described the album as "more depressing than rewarding," and described the recording session as "desultory."

== Track listing ==
All compositions by Bud Powell unless otherwise indicated

1. "Caravan Riffs" / "Ups 'n Downs" – 4:00
2. "Like Someone in Love" (Jimmy Van Heusen, Johnny Burke) – 2:38
3. "Earl's Impro" – 2:57
4. "Thelonious" (Thelonious Monk) – 3:01
5. "Moment's Notice" (John Coltrane) – 3:47
6. "Caravan Riffs" – 3:12
7. "'Round Midnight" (Monk) – 5:31*
8. "Jazz Black/White" – 3:07
9. "Buttercup" – 2:10
10. "March to Paris" – 2:26
11. "No Smokin'" (Horace Silver) – 5:09
12. "I'm Always Chasing Rainbows" (Harry Carroll, Joseph McCarthy) – 2:37

*Recorded live at the Charlie Parker 10th Memorial Concert in 1965

== Personnel ==
- Bud Powell – piano
- Unknown; possibly Scotty Holt – bass (1, 3–6, 8, 10–12)
- Unknown; possibly J. C. Moses or Rashied Ali – drums (1, 3–6, 8, 10–12)
