= Mediocre (composition) =

Song by Bud Powell

from the album The Lonely One...
- Released: 1959
- Recorded: January 13, 1955
- Genre: Jazz
- Length: 2:56
- Label: Verve
- Composer: Bud Powell
- Producer: Norman Granz

"Mediocre" is a composition written by Bud Powell c. 1955 for his album The Lonely One... which has been noted for its unconventional structure and its combination of stride piano with jarring right-hand interpretation.

== History ==
Powell recorded the composition only once in his entire career: on January 13, 1955, at Fine Sound Studios in NYC for Verve Records. He was joined by Percy Heath on bass and Kenny Clarke on drums, and the album was released by Verve as The Lonely One... in 1959.

== Reception ==
The unconventional composition has divided critics. Patrick Burnette of All About Jazz described the first half of the track as "slyly humorous," but criticized the recording quality and summarized it as "a frightening record which seems a direct expression of—rather than an aesthetic response to (a la 'Glass Enclosure')—his unstable mental condition." Barry Harris and Michael Weiss showed similar concern regarding the composition. DownBeat praised the composition as "oddly fetching," and, regarding the place of the composition within the album, remarked that its "idiosyncrasy reaches some lofty plateau."

Weiss noted that the bassline occasionally clashes with the piano during the tune, and suggested that Heath played through the recording by ear.

== Notable recordings ==
- The Lonely One... with Heath and Clarke
- Remembering Bud Powell by Chick Corea
