= Eternity (Bud Powell album) =

Studio album by Bud Powell
- Released: 2004
- Recorded: 1961–1964
- Studio: Francis Paudras' home
- Genre: Jazz
- Label: Piadrum Records
- Producer: Celia Powell

Bud Powell chronology
Bud Plays Bird (1997)	Eternity (2004)	The Complete RCA Trio Sessions (2009)

Professional ratings
Review scores
Source	Rating
All About Jazz	1/5 stars
AllMusic	4/5 stars

Eternity is an album by jazz pianist Bud Powell, recorded informally at Francis Paudras' home between 1961 and 1964 and released in 2004.

== Reception ==
The album received mixed but generally positive reviews upon release. According to jazz critic Scott Yanow, the album's "previously unreleased solo piano performances were recorded by photographer Francis Paudras in France and are from an extensive tape collection owned by Celia Powell, Bud's daughter." He praised the recording quality given the circumstances and described Bud Powell's form as "generally excellent." Yanow awarded the album 4 stars out of 5. Robert Calder described Eternity as "a selection of consistent performances deficient mainly in the sound quality of the last couple tracks, as well as some occasional slight thinning of the recorded piano tone. It’s of definite individual musical interest." However, Jack Bowers of All About Jazz was less complimentary, claiming that "Powell [was] essentially alone at the piano, in Francis Paudras' apartment in rue de Boursault, noodling away on an Erard baby grand, playing for his own amusement and presumably never dreaming that his cursory exercises, taped on what is said to be an English Ferrograph recorder, might one day reach a wider audience."

== Track list ==
1. "Spring Is Here" (Lorenz Hart, Richard Rodgers) – 2:30
2. "Shaw 'Nuff" (Ray Brown, Gil Fuller, Dizzy Gillespie) – 2:51
3. "A Night in Tunisia" (Gillespie, Frank Paparelli) – 2:52
4. "Joshua's Blues" (Powell) – 3:35
5. "'Round Midnight" (Bernie Hanighen, Thelonious Monk, Cootie Williams) – 5:46
6. "I Hear Music" (Burton Lane, Frank Loesser) – 4:26
7. "Someone to Watch Over Me" (George Gershwin, Ira Gershwin) – 4:53
8. "I'll Keep Loving You" (Powell) – 2:26
9. "Idaho" (Jesse Stone) – 1:43
10. "Blues for Bouffémont" (Powell) – 4:22
11. "Deep Night" (Charles Henderson, Rudy Vallée) – 3:32
12. "But Beautiful" (Jimmy Van Heusen, Johnny Burke) – 2:45
13. "Tenderly" (Walter Gross, Jack Lawrence) – 2:26

== Personnel ==
- Bud Powell – piano
- Francis Paudras – percussion
