= A Portrait of Thelonious =

Studio album by Bud Powell
- Released: 1965
- Recorded: December 17, 1961
- Genre: Jazz
- Length: 47:04
- Label: Columbia
- Producer: Cannonball Adderley

Bud Powell chronology
The Return of Bud Powell (1964)	A Portrait of Thelonious (1965)	Ups 'n Downs (1973)

Professional ratings
Review scores
Source	Rating
Allmusic	4/5 stars
DownBeat	3/5 stars
The Penguin Guide to Jazz Recordings	3.5/4 stars

A Portrait of Thelonious is a studio album by jazz pianist Bud Powell, released on Columbia in 1965, featuring a session recorded at Studio Charlot in Paris on December 17, 1961, with Pierre Michelot on bass and Kenny Clarke on drums. The session was the second of two produced by Cannonball Adderley with Powell, following the A Tribute to Cannonball session recorded two days earlier.

The album was digitally remastered and re-released on CD in 1997 with one additional take and without the fake applause added to the original LP.

== History ==
The album features four Monk compositions, only one of which had previously been recorded by Powell. That composition is the first track on the album, "Off Minor", a song that Powell recorded during his first session as leader (see Bud Powell Trio) in January 1947. The 1947 recording had been the song's debut recording, since Monk himself only recorded it in October the same year (see Genius of Modern Music).

== Reception ==
Don Nelson of DownBeat sharply criticized "Ruby, My Dear," which had previously been released on a compilation album; he described it as "unrepresentative of a giant." He noted that a previous DownBeat review of the compilation had come to a similar conclusion and had discouraged release of the full album. However, Nelson praised the album's other tracks, particularly those with a faster tempo, such as "Foolin'," "Thelonious," and "There Will Never Be Another You."

== Track listing ==
All songs were written by Thelonious Monk, except where noted.

1. "Off Minor" – 5:20
2. "There Will Never Be Another You" (Harry Warren, Mack Gordon) – 4:17
3. "Ruby, My Dear" – 5:46
4. "No Name Blues" (Earl Bostic) – 6:38
1. "Thelonious" – 3:46
2. "Monk's Mood" – 7:06
3. "I Ain't Fooling" (Charles Albertine) – 3:19
4. "Squatty" (Brian Fahey) – 5:48
5. "Squatty" [unissued alternate] (Fahey) – 5:04 (not on original LP)

== Personnel ==
=== Performance ===
- Bud Powell – piano
- Pierre Michelot – bass
- Kenny Clarke – drums

=== Production ===
- Cannonball Adderley – producer
- Orrin Keepnews – liner notes, reissue producer
- Nica de Koenigswarter – cover art
- Dan Morgenstern – liner notes (original LP)
- Mark Wilder – remastering
