= Bud Plays Bird =

Studio album by Bud Powell
- Released: 1996
- Recorded: October 14, 1957; December 2, 1957; January 30, 1958 (New York City)
- Genre: Jazz
- Length: 61:38
- Label: Roulette / Blue Note
- Producer: Rudy Traylor, Michael Cuscuna

Bud Powell chronology
| The Complete Blue Note and Roost Recordings (1994) | Bud Plays Bird (1996) | Eternity (2004) |

Professional ratings
Review scores
| Source | Rating |
|---|---|
| AllMusic | 4/5 stars |
| The Penguin Guide to Jazz Recordings | 4/4 stars |

Bud Plays Bird is a studio album by the jazz pianist Bud Powell, recorded late 1957/early 1958 for Roulette, but unreleased until 1996, when it was rediscovered by Michael Cuscuna and released by Blue Note (under the Roulette label) as part of The Blue Note Collection.

== Track listing ==
All songs were written by Charlie Parker, except where noted.

1. "Big Foot" [long version] (aka "Drifting on a Reed") – 6:24
2. "Shaw 'Nuff" (Charlie Parker, Dizzy Gillespie) – 4:10
3. "Buzzy" – 4:02
4. "Yardbird Suite" – 4:04
5. "Relaxin' at Camarillo" – 4:27
6. "Confirmation" – 5:50
7. "Billie's Bounce" – 4:02
8. "Ko Ko" – 5:40
9. "Barbados"—4:09
10. "Dewey Square" – 4:14
11. "Moose the Mooche" – 3:37
12. "Ornithology" (Benny Harris, Charlie Parker) – 5:06
13. "Scrapple from the Apple" – 3:51
14. "Salt Peanuts" (Dizzy Gillespie, Kenny Clarke) – 2:41
15. "Big Foot" [short version] (aka "Drifting on a Reed") – 3:30

== Personnel ==
=== Performance ===
October 14, 1957, tracks 2–4, 6, 8, 11, 14. December 2, 1957, tracks 7, 12. January 30, 1958, tracks 1, 5, 9–10, 13, 15. New York.

- Bud Powell – piano
- George Duvivier – bass
- Art Taylor – drums

=== Production ===
- Rudy Traylor – producer
- Michael Cuscuna – producer (1997 release)
- Malcolm Addey – mastering
- Ira Gitler – liner notes
- Francis Wolff – cover photo
