= Bouncing with Bud (album) =

Studio album by Bud Powell
- Released: 1962
- Recorded: April 26, 1962
- Genre: Bebop
- Length: 42:37
- Label: Sonet

Bud Powell chronology
The Scene Changes (1959)	Bouncing with Bud (1962)	Our Man in Paris (1963)

Bouncing with Bud, also known as In Copenhagen in later releases, is a 1962 album by jazz pianist Bud Powell, recorded in Copenhagen for Sonet Records, Delmark, and Storyville with Niels-Henning Ørsted Pedersen on bass and William Schiopffe on drums. It was re-released by Mobile Fidelity with improved audio quality on CD.

== History ==
Ørsted Pedersen was only 16 years old at the time of the recording session. The album is unusual for its preference for up-tempo tunes, as Powell did not want to play a slow blues on the session as was typical on his later albums.

== Reception ==
Professional ratings
Review scores
Source	Rating
All About Jazz	4/5 stars
AllMusic	3.5/5 stars
DownBeat	4.5/5 stars
The Penguin Guide to Jazz	3/4 stars
The Rolling Stone Jazz & Blues Album Guide	3/5 stars

In a review for AllMusic, Scott Yanow called the album "an excellent set," with eight tracks that "showcase Bud Powell during his European renaissance period, giving pianists a definitive lesson in playing bop."

Author Len Lyons wrote: "Bud's improvisations... are singable, nearly begging for lyrics. Bud's technique may have been blunted but not his imagination."

Pianist and composer Ethan Iverson described the recording as "a powerful album that should be much better known," and commented: "The repertoire choices are terrific... He's slowed down a bit since 1948 but Bud's still got it."

Marc Myers of JazzWax noted that, on the Monk tunes, Powell can be heard "giving each just the right amount of jagged edge and keyboard pounce that were Monk hallmarks." He concluded: "Despite suffering from mental illness and self-medicating with alcohol, Powell remained a singular talent up until his death."

The authors of The Penguin Guide to Jazz Recordings called the music "quite predictable fare, played with discipline but not much passion."

Harvey Pekar praised the album in DownBeat, giving it 4.5 stars out of five and noted "it may be the finest record he's cut since 1953... He constructs very well, resolving his ideas intelligently. His slow, stern, majestic '[I Remember] Clifford' theme statements stand out; on them he mixes chords and single-note lines effectively."

== Track listing ==
Compositions by Bud Powell unless otherwise indicated

1. "Rifftide" (Coleman Hawkins) – 4:17
2. "Bouncing With Bud" – 6:02
3. "Move" (Denzil Best) – 5:00
4. "The Best Thing For You" (Irving Berlin) – 6:02
5. "Straight, No Chaser" (Thelonious Monk) – 6:46
6. "I Remember Clifford" (Benny Golson) – 6:16
7. "Hot House" (Tadd Dameron) – 5:51
8. "52nd Street Theme" (Monk) – 2:23

== Personnel ==
- Bud Powell – piano
- Niels-Henning Ørsted Pedersen – bass
- William Schiopffe – drums
- Erik Wiedemann – liner notes
