= Jazz Giant =

Studio album by Bud Powell
- Released: 1950
- Recorded: February 23, 1949, February 1950
- Genre: Jazz
- Length: 40:14
- Label: Norgran / Verve
- Producer: Norman Granz

Bud Powell chronology
Jazz Giant (1950)	The Amazing Bud Powell (1952)

Professional ratings
Review scores
Source	Rating
Allmusic	4.5/5 stars
All About Jazz	(favorable)

Jazz Giant is a studio album by jazz pianist Bud Powell, released on Norgran in 1950, featuring two sessions that Powell recorded for Norman Granz in 1949 and 1950.

The album was remastered and re-released on CD in 2001 by Verve as a Verve Master Edition. The sessions also appear on The Complete Bud Powell on Verve (1994) box set.

== History ==
The first session, with Ray Brown and Max Roach, took place on February 23, 1949, after Powell obtained a temporary release from Creedmoor State Hospital where he was receiving psychiatric treatment, and represents his second recording date as leader (the first being his Roost session in 1947 – see Bud Powell Trio). The second, with Curley Russell and Roach, is from February 1950, post-dating his first Blue Note session for The Amazing Bud Powell.

== Track listing ==
All songs were written by Bud Powell, except where noted.

1. "Tempus Fugue-it" (aka "Tempus Fugit") – 2:29
2. "Celia" – 3:01
3. "Cherokee" (Ray Noble) – 3:39
4. "I'll Keep Loving You" – 2:43
5. "Strictly Confidential" – 3:10
6. "All God's Chillun Got Rhythm" (Bronislaw Kaper, Gus Kahn, Walter Jurmann) – 3:02
7. "So Sorry Please" – 3:18
8. "Get Happy" (Harold Arlen, Ted Koehler) – 2:55
9. "Sometimes I'm Happy" (Vincent Youmans, Irving Caesar) – 3:40
10. "Sweet Georgia Brown" (Maceo Pinkard, Kenneth Casey) – 2:51
11. "Yesterdays" (Jerome Kern, Otto Harbach) – 2:53
12. "April in Paris" (Vernon Duke, E.Y. "Yip" Harburg) – 3:12
13. "Body and Soul" (Johnny Green, Edward Heyman, Robert Sour, Frank Eyton) – 3:21

== Personnel ==
=== Performance ===
- Bud Powell – piano

February 23, 1949, tracks 1–6.

- Ray Brown – bass (except track 4 – Powell solo)
- Max Roach – drums (except track 4 – Powell solo)

February 1950, tracks 7–13.

- Curley Russell – bass (except track 11 – Powell solo)
- Max Roach – drums (except track 11 – Powell solo)

=== Production ===
- Norman Granz – producer
- David Stone Martin – cover design

== Release history ==
All of the tracks on Jazz Giant apart from "Cherokee" were first released in album form on two 10" LPs in 1950: Piano Solos and Piano Solos #2, the latter LP also having two tracks ("Tea for Two" and "Hallelujah!") from a separate session not on Jazz Giant. "Cherokee" had only previously appeared as a single and on The Jazz Scene, a compilation album featuring various artists.

=== Piano Solos 10" LP (MG 35012, MGC 102, MGC 502) ===
Piano Solos 10" LP

1. "Tempus Fugue-It" – 2:29
2. "I'll Keep Loving You" – 2:43
3. "Celia" – 3:01
1. "All God's Chillun Got Rhythm" (Kaper, Kahn, Jurmann) – 3:02
2. "Yesterdays" (Kern, Harbach) – 2:53
3. "Strictly Confidential" – 3:10

February 23, 1949, side A tracks 1–3, side B tracks 1, 3.

- Ray Brown – bass
- Max Roach – drums

February 1950, side B track 2 – Powell solo.

=== Piano Solos #2 10" LP (MGC 507) ===
Piano Solos #2 10" LP

1. "So Sorry Please" – 3:18
2. "April in Paris" (Duke, Harburg) – 3:13
3. "Get Happy" (Arlen, Koehler) – 2:55
4. "Tea For Two" – 3:49
1. "Sweet Georgia Brown" (Pinkard, Casey) – 2:51
2. "Body and Soul" (Green, Heyman, Sour, Eyton) – 3:24
3. "Sometimes I'm Happy" (Youmans, Caesar) – 3:40
4. "Hallelujah!" – 2:59

February 1950, side A tracks 1–3, side B tracks 1–3.

- Curley Russell – bass
- Max Roach – drums

July 1, 1950, side A track 4, side B track 4

- Ray Brown – bass
- Buddy Rich – drums
