= Bouncing with Bud =

1946 jazz standard by Bud Powell

Song by Bud Powell
- Recorded: August 23, 1946
- Genre: Bebop
- Label: Savoy
- Composer: Bud Powell

Official audio
- "Bouncing With Bud" (Bud Powell Trio, 1962) on YouTube

Bouncing with Bud (also known as Bebop in Pastel) is a 1946 jazz standard by American pianist Bud Powell and Gil Fuller, which features the saxophone of Sonny Stitt and the trumpet of Kenny Dorham. It was originally recorded on 23 August 1946 as "Bebop in Pastel".

== Composition ==
In the key of B-flat major, the tune is a "nonblues theme whose form is A-A'-B-A' with an eight-bar interlude that is not played during the solos." The introduction consists of an ascending line that modulates between two chords, Bbmaj7#11 and B7b5 before resolving to Bb through the use of a tritone substitution.

== Notable performances ==
Powell played the theme under the debut title "Bouncing with Bud" on August 9, 1949 for Blue Note Records with Sonny Rollins, Fats Navarro, Tommy Potter and Roy Haynes, for a recording which is often wrongly thought to be the original. The same recording session included two alternate takes of the tune that were later released as well. He recorded a trio version as the title tune of his 1962 Delmark album Bouncing with Bud.

Numerous other artists have covered it, including Hank Mobley with Donald Byrd for Prestige Records, Art Blakey and the Jazz Messengers on Paris Jam Session with Bud on piano, Charles McPherson for his Live in Tokyo (1976) and pianist Keith Jarrett as the opening track for his 1999 live album Whisper Not.
