= David Stone Martin =

American artist (1913–1992)

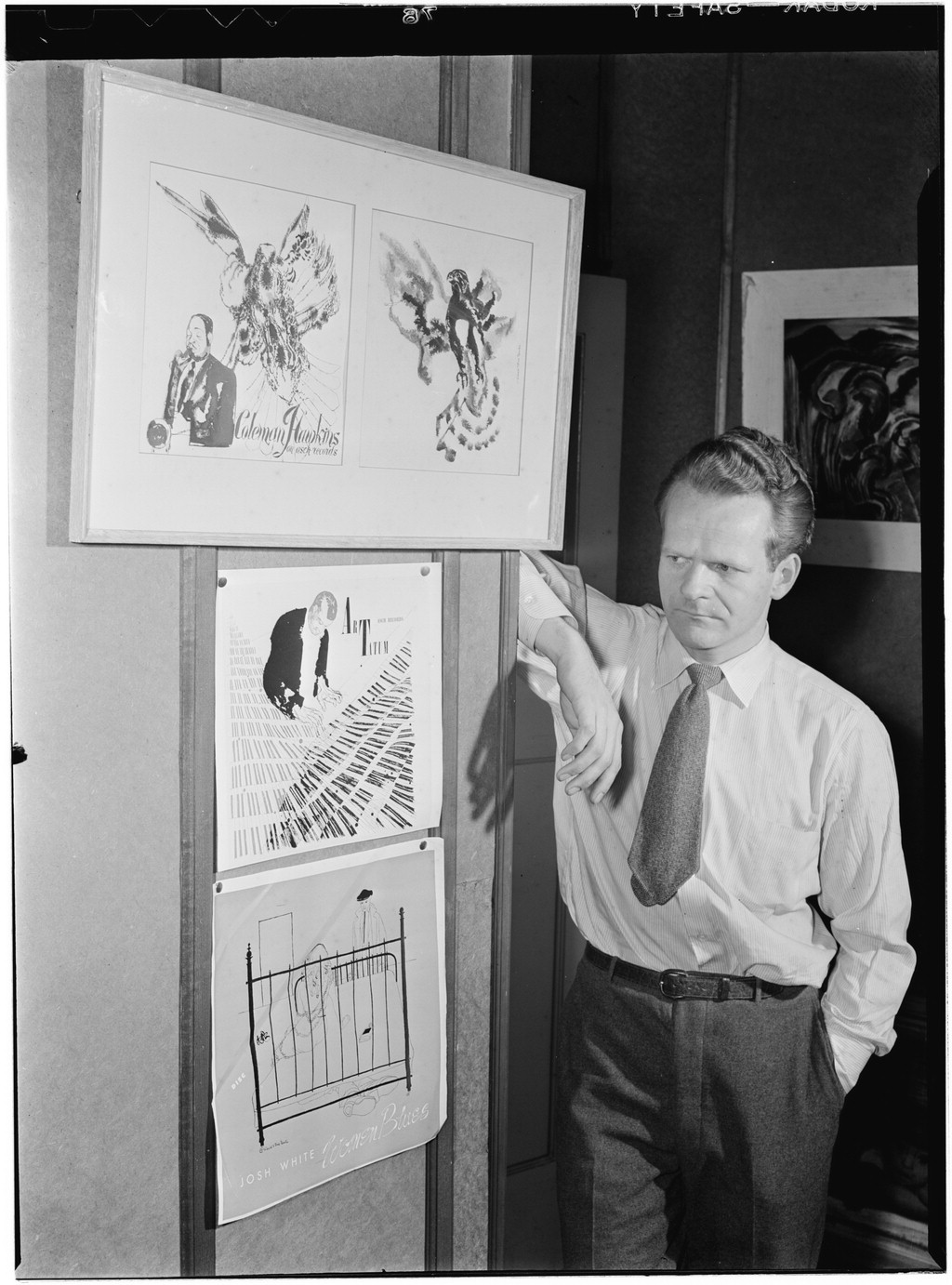
David Stone Martin, c. April 1947, photo by William P. Gottlieb.

David Stone Martin, born David Livingstone Martin (June 13, 1913 – March 6, 1992 in New London, Connecticut) was an American artist best known for his illustrations on jazz record albums.

== Biography ==
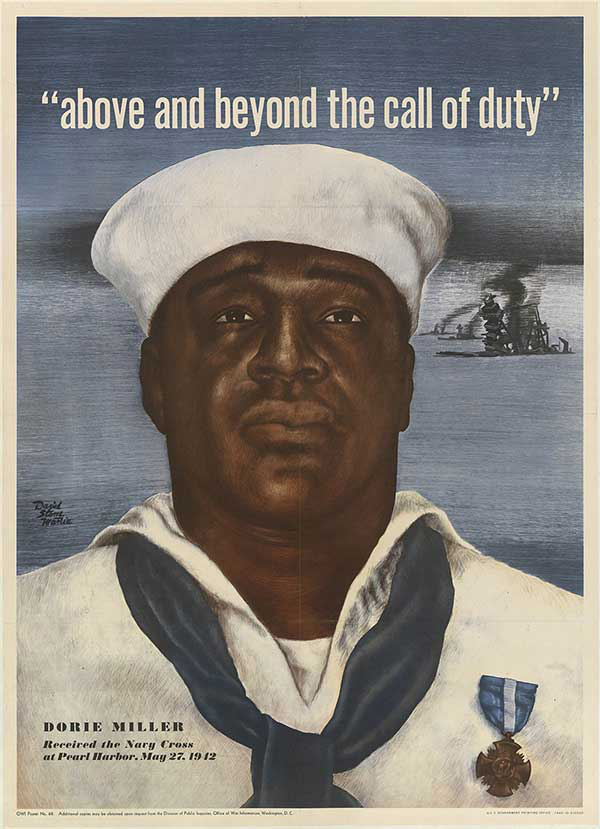
Poster featuring Navy Cross recipient Dorie Miller, created by David Stone Martin for the Office of War Information (1943)

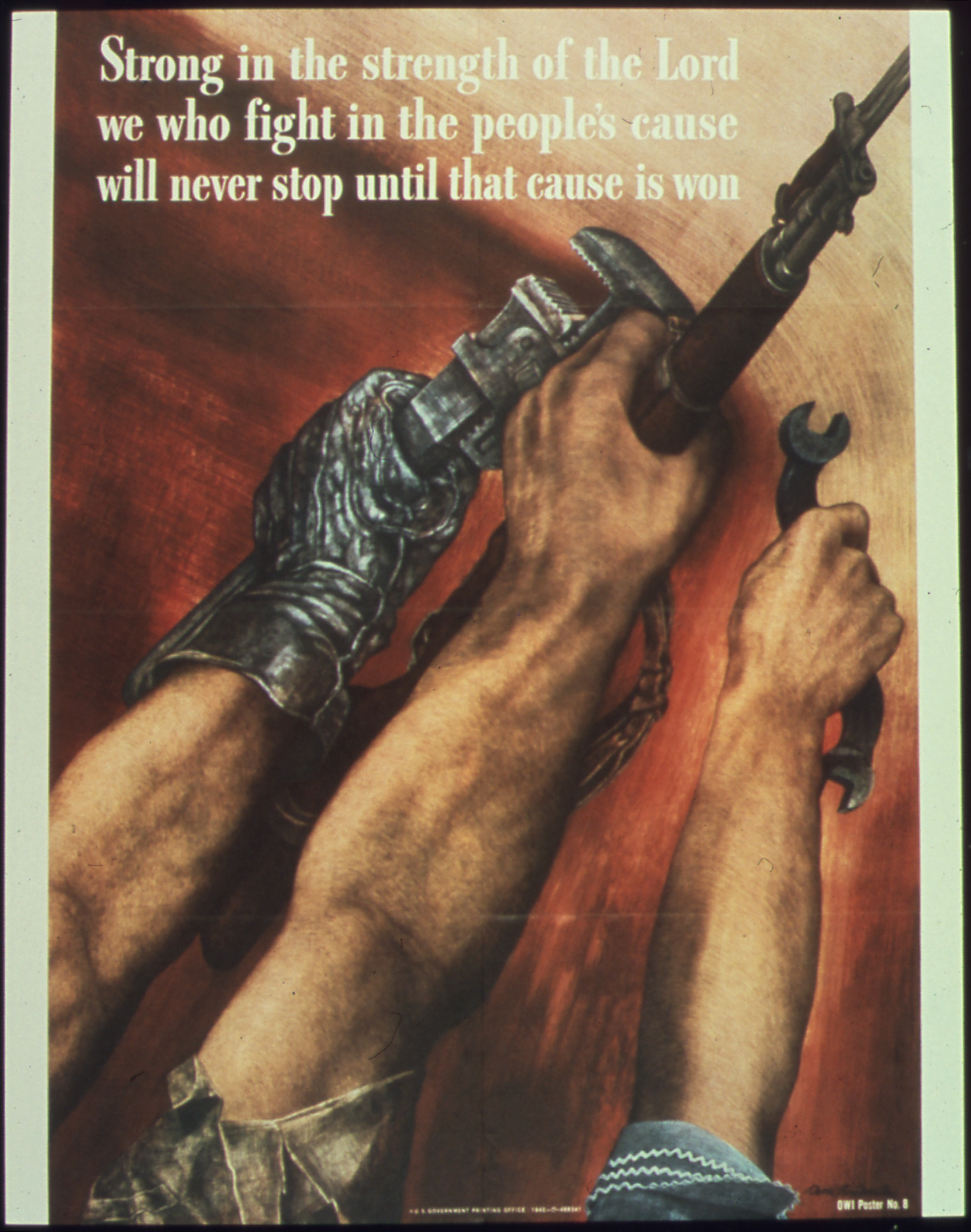
Poster by Martin for the OWI (1942)

David Stone Martin was born June 13, 1913, in Chicago and attended evening classes at the School of the Art Institute of Chicago. He was greatly influenced by the line art of Ben Shahn. During World War II, Martin was an art director for the United States Office of War Information. By 1950, Martin had produced more than 100 covers for Mercury, Asch, Disc and Dial record albums. Many assignments came from his longtime friend, record producer Norman Granz.

For various companies, Martin eventually created illustrations for more than 400 record albums. Many of these were simply line art combined with a single color. Martin's favorite tool was a crowquill pen, which enabled him to do delicate line work. CBS-TV art director William Golden gave Martin many print ad assignments during the 1950s, and Martin soon expanded into illustration for Seventeen, The Saturday Evening Post and other slick magazines of the 1950s and 1960s. His studio was located in Roosevelt, New Jersey, near his home there.

Martin is represented in the Museum of Modern Art, the Metropolitan Museum of Art, the Art Institute of Chicago and the Smithsonian Institution.

Martin was the husband of muralist Thelma Martin, who painted the post office mural for the facility in Sweetwater, Tennessee. He was the father of graphic artist Stefan Martin (born 1936) and painter Tony Martin. He died March 6, 1992, in New London, Connecticut, where he had lived in his old age.

== Notable album covers ==
- All or Nothing at All, Billie Holiday, Verve
- The Astaire Story, Fred Astaire, Clef
- Billie Holiday Sings, Clef
- Bird & Diz, Charlie Parker and Dizzy Gillespie, Clef
- Buddy and Sweets, Harry "Sweets" Edison and Buddy Rich, Norgran
- An Evening with Billie Holiday, Clef
- Jazz Giant, Bud Powell, Norgran
- Lester Young Trio, Mercury
- Lester Young with the Oscar Peterson Trio, Norgran
- Love Is a Gentle Thing, Harry Belafonte, RCA
- Oscar Peterson Plays Duke Ellington, Clef
- Oscar Peterson Plays Porgy & Bess, Verve
- Piano Interpretations by Bud Powell, Norgran
- Piano Solos, Bud Powell, Clef
- Piano Solos #2, Bud Powell, Clef
- Sing and Swing with Buddy Rich, Norgran
- Struggle, Woody Guthrie, Smithsonian Folkways
- Swinging Brass with the Oscar Peterson Trio, Verve
- The Tal Farlow Album, Tal Farlow, Norgran
- These Are the Blues, Ella Fitzgerald, Verve
- Toshiko's Piano, Toshiko Akiyoshi, Norgran
- Urbanity, Hank Jones, Clef

== Time magazine covers ==
- David Merrick, 25 March 1966
- Robert F. Kennedy, 16 September 1966
- Inside the Viet Cong, 25 August 1967
- Mayor Carl Stokes, 17 November 1967
- Gen. Vo Nguyen Giap, 9 February 1968
- Sen. Eugene McCarthy, 22 March 1968
- Nguyen Van Thieu, 28 March 1969
- Gov. George Wallace, 27 March 1972
