= Bud Powell's Moods =

Studio album by Bud Powell
- Released: 1956
- Recorded: June 2 & 4, 1954, January 12, 1955
- Genre: Jazz
- Length: 38:14
- Label: Norgran
- Producer: Norman Granz

Bud Powell chronology
The Amazing Bud Powell, Vols. 1 & 2 (1956)	Bud Powell's Moods (1956)	Piano Interpretations by Bud Powell (1956)

Professional ratings
Review scores
Source	Rating
AllMusic	4.5/5 stars

Bud Powell's Moods is a studio album by jazz pianist Bud Powell, released in 1956 by Norgran, featuring sessions that Powell recorded in 1954 and 1955.

== Background ==
The sessions on this album mark the beginning of a two-year period (from June 1954 to September 1956) when Powell recorded exclusively for Norman Granz at Fine Sound Studios in New York.

== Style, writing, composition ==
The two Powell compositions, "Buttercup" and "Fantasy in Blue", are both up-tempo, in contrast to the ballads comprising the rest of the album.

According to pianist Barry Harris, Powell did not select many of the tunes for the session, and he was unfamiliar with some of them, particularly "I Get a Kick Out of You," at the time of recording.

== Release history ==
The album was re-issued by Verve, and released as a CD replica by Verve (Japan) in 2006 (POCJ-2740). The sessions (with alternate takes) are also available on CD on The Complete Bud Powell on Verve (1994) box set.

== Track listing ==
=== 12" LP (MGN 1064, MGV 8154) ===
All songs were written by Bud Powell, except where noted.

=== Side A ===
1. "Moonlight in Vermont" (Karl Suessdorf, John Blackburn) – 3:35
2. "Spring Is Here" (Richard Rodgers, Lorenz Hart) – 3:27
3. "Buttercup" – 2:59
4. "Fantasy in Blue" – 3:04
5. "It Never Entered My Mind" (Rodgers, Hart) – 2:56
6. "A Foggy Day" (George Gershwin, Ira Gershwin) – 3:45

=== Side B ===
1. "Time Was" (AKA "Duerme" «Sleep») (Miguel Prado, Gabriel Luna, Bob Russell) – 4:17
2. "My Funny Valentine" (Rodgers, Hart) – 2:53
3. "I Get a Kick Out of You" (Cole Porter) – 4:26
4. "You Go to My Head" (J. Fred Coots, Haven Gillespie) – 4:11
5. "The Best Thing for You (Would Be Me)" (Irving Berlin) – 2:41

== Personnel ==
=== Musicians ===
==== June 2, 1954 ====
- Bud Powell – piano
- George Duvivier – bass
- Art Taylor – drums
  - Fine Sound Studios, New York, side A tracks 1–4

==== June 4, 1954 ====
- Bud Powell – piano
- Percy Heath – bass
- Art Taylor – drums
  - Fine Sound Studios, New York, side A tracks 5–6 and side B tracks 1–2

==== January 12, 1955 ====
- Bud Powell – piano
- Lloyd Trotman – bass
- Art Blakey – drums
  - Fine Sound Studios, New York, side B tracks 3–5

=== Production ===
- Norman Granz – producer
- David Stone Martin – cover design

== Release history ==
The Artistry of Bud Powell

The two June 1954 sessions were originally released on a 10" LP called The Artistry of Bud Powell on Norgran in 1954.

=== The Artistry of Bud Powell 10" LP (MGN 23) ===
1. "Moonlight in Vermont" (Suessdorf, Blackburn)
2. "Spring Is Here" (Rodgers, Hart)
3. "Buttercup"
4. "Fantasy in Blue"
1. "It Never Entered My Mind" (Rodgers, Hart)
2. "A Foggy Day" (Gershwin, Gershwin)
3. "Time Was" (Prado, Luna, Russell)
4. "My Funny Valentine" (Rodgers, Hart)
