= A Tribute to Cannonball =

Studio album by Bud Powell and Don Byas
- Released: March 1979
- Recorded: December 15, 1961
- Genre: Jazz
- Length: 60:59
- Label: Columbia
- Producer: Cannonball Adderley

Bud Powell chronology
At the Golden Circle (1978)	A Tribute to Cannonball (1979)	Inner Fires (1982)

Don Byas chronology
Midnight at Minton's (1973)	A Tribute to Cannonball (1979)

Professional ratings
Review scores
Source	Rating
Allmusic	4/5 stars
DownBeat	5/5 stars
The Penguin Guide to Jazz Recordings	3/4 stars

A Tribute to Cannonball is a studio album by jazz pianist Bud Powell and tenor saxophonist Don Byas, released on Columbia in March 1979, featuring a session recorded at the Studio Charlot in Paris on 15 December 1961, with Pierre Michelot on bass and Kenny Clarke on drums, and trumpeter Idrees Sulieman guesting on four tracks. The session was produced by Cannonball Adderley, who would also produce Powell's follow-up A Portrait of Thelonious recorded two days later.

The album was digitally remastered and re-released on CD in 1997, and included a newly discovered session take of "Cherokee" with Cannonball Adderley on alto.

== Reception ==
Terry Martin of DownBeat praised the album, writing, "The contribution of the other musicians is largely that of providing the stimulating framework for one of the tenor saxophonist’s most successful recordings, though Powell’s work also repays close attention and Idrees Sulieman’s playing supplies a brassy contrast of Navarroish melodicism to four tunes."

== Track listing ==
1. "Just One of Those Things" (Cole Porter) – 5:08
2. "Jackie My Little Cat" (Pierre Michelot) – 4:48
3. "Cherokee" (Ray Noble) – 6:18
4. "I Remember Clifford" (Benny Golson) – 6:15
5. "Good Bait" (Tadd Dameron, Count Basie) – 6:30
6. "Jeannine" (Duke Pearson) – 5:59
7. "All the Things You Are" (Jerome Kern, Oscar Hammerstein II) – 7:24
8. "Myth" (Michelot) – 5:32
9. "Jackie My Little Cat" (Michelot) – 5:14
10. "Cherokee" [unissued alternate] [incomplete] (Noble) – 7:51 (not on original LP)

== Personnel ==
=== Performance ===
- Idrees Sulieman – trumpet (tracks 5–8 only)
- Cannonball Adderley – alto sax (track 10 only)
- Don Byas – tenor sax
- Bud Powell – piano
- Pierre Michelot – bass
- Kenny Clarke – drums

=== Production ===
- Cannonball Adderley – producer
- Howard Fritzson – art direction
- Gary Giddins – liner notes (original LP)
- Teo Macero – Executive producer (original LP)
- Orrin Keepnews – CD liner notes, reissue producer
- Jean-Pierre Leloir – photography
- Fred Scaboda – cover art
- Mark Wilder – remastering
