= Clarence Profit =

American jazz musician

Clarence Profit (June 26, 1912 – October 22, 1944) was a jazz pianist and composer associated with swing.

Profit was born in New York, United States. He came from a musical family and began studying piano at the age of three, and he led a ten-piece band in New York City in his teens. A visit to his grandparents in Antigua resulted in his staying in the Caribbean for five years. He also led a group in Bermuda. He returned to the US and led his own trio, which was noted as "a format which best suited his powerful stride piano style". He co-composed "Lullaby In Rhythm" with Edgar Sampson. He was respected in his era, but after his early death fell into obscurity.

He died in New York in October 1944, at the age of 32.
