= Time Waits =

- The Amazing Bud Powell, Vol. 4

Studio album by the Amazing Bud Powell
- Released: 1958
- Recorded: May 24, 1958
- Studio: Van Gelder Studio; Hackensack, NJ
- Genre: Bebop
- Label: Blue Note; BLP 1598
- Producer: Alfred Lion

The Amazing Bud Powell chronology
Swingin' with Bud (1958)	Time Waits (1958)	The Lonely One... (1959)

Time Waits, also known as The Amazing Bud Powell, Vol. 4, is a studio album by American jazz pianist Bud Powell recorded at Van Gelder Studio on May 24, 1958, with rhythm section Sam Jones and Philly Joe Jones and released on Blue Note later that year.

== Background ==
Professional ratings
Review scores
Source	Rating
AllMusic	4.5/5 stars
Billboard	3/4 stars
The Penguin Guide to Jazz Recordings	3/4 stars
The Rolling Stone Jazz Record Guide	2/5 stars

The title track, a version of the Mexican popular song "Duerme", was recorded by Powell in 1954 for Verve, and in 1956 for RCA, under its original English-language title "Time Was".

The album was remastered in 1999 by Rudy Van Gelder and re-issued as part of Blue Note's RVG Edition series.

== Reception ==
Billboard praised the album, noting, "Bud Powell is still one of the best of the hard-playing pianists."

== Track listing ==
All tracks are written by Bud Powell.

Side 1
No.	Title	Length
1.	"Buster Rides Again"	5:30
2.	"Sub City"	4:32
3.	"Time Waits"	5:06
4.	"Marmalade"	4:28

Side 2
No.	Title	Length
1.	"Monopoly"	4:47
2.	"John's Abbey"	5:36
3.	"Dry Soul"	6:41
4.	"Sub City" (alternate take)	2:36

CD reissue bonus track
No.	Title	Length
9.	"John's Abbey" (alternate take)	2:25

== Personnel ==
=== Musicians ===
- Bud Powell – piano
- Sam Jones – bass
- Philly Joe Jones – drums

=== Technical personnel ===
==== Original ====
- Alfred Lion – producer
- Rudy Van Gelder – recording engineer
- Reid Miles – design
- Francis Wolff – photography
- Leonard Feather – liner notes

==== Reissue ====
- Michael Cuscuna – producer
- Rudy Van Gelder – remastering
- Bob Blumenthal – liner notes
