= Bud Powell Trio =

Studio album by Bud Powell
- Released: 1957
- Recorded: January 10, 1947; September 1953
- Genre: Jazz, bebop
- Length: 43:04
- Label: Roost / Roulette
- Producer: Teddy Reig

Bud Powell chronology
Piano Interpretations by Bud Powell (1956)	Bud Powell Trio (1957)	Strictly Powell (1957)

Professional ratings
Review scores
Source	Rating
Allmusic	4.5/5 stars
The Rolling Stone Jazz Record Guide	4/5 stars

Bud Powell Trio is a studio album by jazz pianist Bud Powell, released on Roost in 1957, featuring two sessions that Powell recorded in 1947 and 1953. The 1947 session was Powell's first studio recording as leader, and was originally released as a 10" LP called The Bud Powell Trio.

The album was released on CD in 1990 by Roulette, which acquired Roost in 1958. The material is also available on The Complete Blue Note and Roost Recordings box set from Blue Note.

== Track listing ==
All songs were written by Bud Powell, except where noted.

1. "I'll Remember April" (Gene de Paul, Patricia Johnston, Don Raye) – 2:52
2. "Indiana" (James Hanley, Ballard MacDonald) – 2:44
3. "Somebody Loves Me" (George Gershwin, Ballard MacDonald, B. G. De Sylva) – 2:56
4. "I Should Care" (Axel Stordahl, Paul Weston, Sammy Cahn) – 3:00
5. "Bud's Bubble" (based on "Little Benny" (Benny Harris)) – 2:34
6. "Off Minor" (Thelonious Monk) – 2:21
7. "Nice Work If You Can Get It" (George Gershwin, Ira Gershwin) – 2:17
8. "Everything Happens to Me" (Matt Dennis, Tom Adair) – 2:39
9. "Embraceable You" (George Gershwin, Ira Gershwin) – 2:48
10. "Burt Covers Bud" (based on "Bean and the Boys" (Coleman Hawkins)) – 3:05
11. "My Heart Stood Still" (Richard Rodgers, Lorenz Hart) – 3:15
12. "You'd Be So Nice to Come Home To" (Cole Porter) – 2:38
13. "Bags' Groove" (Milt Jackson) – 2:12
14. "My Devotion" (Roc Hillman, Johnny Napton) – 3:05
15. "Stella by Starlight" (Victor Young) – 2:08
16. "Woody'n You" (Dizzy Gillespie) – 3:00

== Personnel ==
=== Performance ===
- Bud Powell plays piano on all tracks.

January 10, 1947, New York. Tracks 1–8.

- Curly Russell – bass
- Max Roach – drums

September 1953, New York. Tracks 9–16.

- George Duvivier – bass
- Art Taylor – drums

=== Production ===
- Teddy Reig – producer
- Burt Goldblatt – cover design
- Brian Priestley – CD liner notes

== Release history ==
Bud Powell Trio 10" LP

Bud Powell Trio, Vol. 2 10" LP

The 1947 session was originally recorded for De Luxe Records but not released. Two years later Roost released the session in a series of four 78s: "Somebody Loves Me c/w Bud's Bubble" (Roost 509), "I'll Remember April c/w Off Minor" (Roost 513), "Indiana c/w Everything Happens to Me" (Roost 518), and "I Should Care c/w Nice Work If You Can Get It" (Roost 521), and released all 8 tracks as a 10" LP in 1951. The 1953 session was released directly as a 10" LP.

=== Bud Powell Trio 10" LP (RLP 401) ===
1. "Somebody Loves Me" (Gershwin, MacDonald, De Sylva) – 2:56
2. "Bud's Bubble" – 2:34
3. "Everything Happens to Me" (Dennis, Adair) – 2:49
4. "Indiana" (Hanley, MacDonald) – 2:44
1. "I'll Remember April" (de Paul, Johnston, Raye) – 2:52
2. "I Should Care" (Stordahl, Weston, Cahn) – 3:00
3. "Nice Work If You Can Get It" (Gershwin, Gershwin) – 2:17
4. "Off Minor" (Monk) – 2:21

=== Bud Powell Trio, Volume 2 10" LP (RLP 412) ===
1. "My Heart Stood Still" (Rodgers, Hart) – 3:15
2. "Embraceable You" (Gershwin, Gershwin) – 2:48
3. "Woody'n You" (Gillespie) – 3:00
4. "You'd Be So Nice to Come Home To" (Porter) – 2:38
1. "Bags' Groove" (Jackson) – 2:12
2. "Stella by Starlight" (Young) – 2:08
3. "Burt Covers Bud" – 3:05
4. "My Devotion" (Hillman, Napton) – 3:05
