= Charles E. Henderson =

American songwriter, arranger, vocal coach and lyricist

Charles Edward Henderson (19 January 1907 – 7 March 1970) was a songwriter, arranger, vocal coach and lyricist. He and Alfred Newman were nominated for the Academy Award for Best Music (Scoring of a Musical Picture) in 1945 for State Fair.

Henderson was born in Boston, Massachusetts and died in Laguna Beach, California.

== Notable works ==
- Fantasia (1940) (choral arrangements for the Ave Maria sequence)
- Dumbo (1941) (vocal arrangements for "Song of the Roustabouts")
- Bambi (1942) (choral arrangements)
- The Bishop's Wife (1947) (vocal director)
- The Enemy Below (1957) (vocal supervisor)
- The Music Man (1962) (vocal arranger)
- "Deep Night" (composer)
- "The Right Kind" (composer)

Broadway theatre

- Blackouts of 1949 (1949); music also by Royal Foster

Film music

- The Rage of Paris (1938)

== Books ==
- Henderson, Charles, with Charles Palmer (1939). How to Sing for Money: The Art and Business of Singing Popular Songs Professionally. Hollywood, Calif.: G Palmer Putnam. OCLC 896876.
