= The Scene Changes (Bud Powell album) =

- The Amazing Bud Powell, Vol. 5

Studio album by the Amazing Bud Powell
- Released: 1959
- Recorded: December 29, 1958
- Genre: Bebop, hard bop
- Length: 44:53
- Label: Blue Note; BLP 4009
- Producer: Alfred Lion

Bud Powell chronology
The Lonely One... (1959)	The Scene Changes (1959)	Bouncing with Bud (1962)

Professional ratings
Review scores
Source	Rating
AllMusic	4/5 stars
DownBeat	4/5 stars
The Penguin Guide to Jazz Recordings	4/4 stars
The Rolling Stone Jazz Record Guide	3/5 stars
All About Jazz	4/5 stars

The Scene Changes, also known as The Amazing Bud Powell, Vol. 5, is a studio album by American jazz pianist Bud Powell recorded at the Van Gelder Studio in Hackensack, New Jersey on December 29, 1958 and released on Blue Note the following year. Powell is backed by rhythm section Paul Chambers and Art Taylor.

== Release history ==
The album was digitally remastered in 2003 by Rudy Van Gelder and re-issued as part of Blue Note's The RVG Edition series.

== Reception ==
DownBeat noted, "Powell on these tracks is original, and he sounds secure in what he is playing. It is good to hear." Marc Davis of All About Jazz described "Crossin' the Channel" as the album's "standout," calling it "a breathless barn burner that harkens back to the early hyper-speedy days of bebop." Davis praised the album as a whole, calling it "awfully good" but highlighting Vol.'s 1 and 2 of The Amazing Bud Powell as his favorite albums of the series.

== Track listing ==
All compositions by Bud Powell.

=== Side 1 ===
1. "Cleopatra's Dream" – 4:22
2. "Duid Deed" – 5:06
3. "Down with It" – 3:58
4. "Danceland" – 3:41
5. "Borderick" – 1:58

=== Side 2 ===
1. "Crossin' the Channel" – 3:28
2. "Comin' Up" – 7:54
3. "Gettin' There" – 5:01
4. "The Scene Changes" – 3:59

=== CD reissue bonus track ===
10. "Comin' Up" (alternate take) – 5:26

== Personnel ==
=== Musicians ===
- Bud Powell – piano
- Paul Chambers – bass
- Art Taylor – drums

=== Technical personnel ===
==== Original ====
- Alfred Lion – producer
- Rudy Van Gelder – recording engineer, mastering
- Reid Miles – design
- Francis Wolff – photography
- Leonard Feather – liner notes

==== Reissue ====
- Michael Cuscuna – producer
- Gordan H. Jee – creative direction
- Michael Boland – art direction and design
- Bob Blumenthal – liner notes
