= Confirmation (composition) =

1945 bebop standard by Charlie Parker

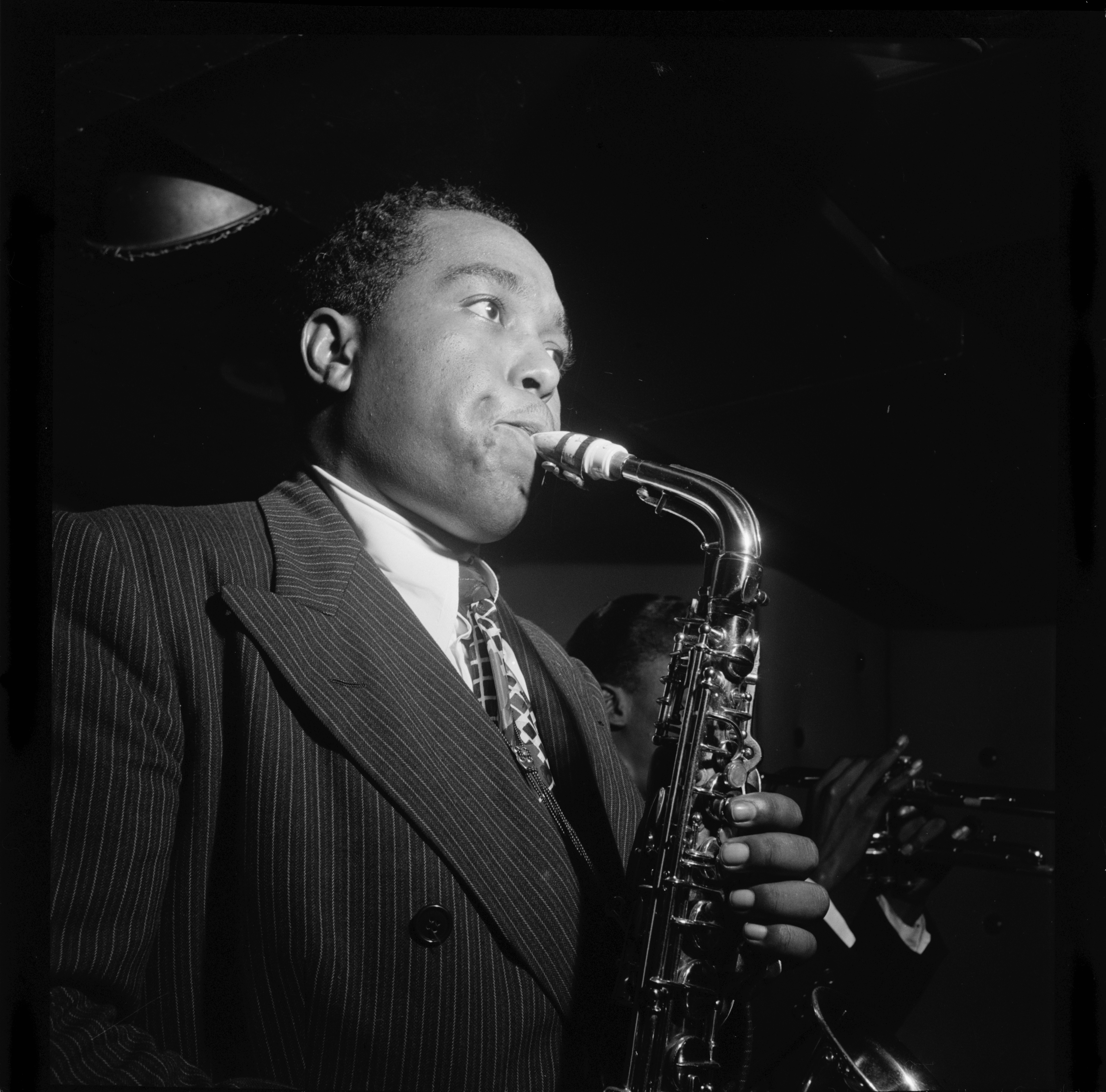
Parker at the Three Deuces jazz club, New York, 1947

"Confirmation" is a bebop standard composed by saxophonist Charlie Parker in 1945. It is known as a challenging number due to its long, complex head and rapid chord changes, which feature an extended cycle of fifths (see Bird changes). Jazz educator Dariusz Terefenko has pointed out the speed and intricacy of its harmonic rhythm (the rate and manner in which chords change underneath the melody), which he notes is typical of the bebop era.

The first recording of "Confirmation" was made by Dizzy Gillespie at a small group session for Dial Records by producer Ross Russell in February 1946 at which Parker was not present. Parker did not record a studio version of "Confirmation" until July 1953. However, Parker did play the piece frequently during live performances, and at least five live recordings of Parker performing "Confirmation" are known to exist. The earliest of these is a 1947 performance with Gillespie at Carnegie Hall.

The musicologist Henry Martin extensively analyses the piece in his 2020 book Charlie Parker, Composer. Martin wrote that the piece "may be Parker's finest display of compositional skill" and describes it as "combining wit, intricacy, and an originality of construction that Parker was unable to equal again". Gary Giddins describes it as an irresistibly bright and songful piece.

Martin Williams, writing in Down Beat in 1965, described "Confirmation" as a "continuous and linear invention"—in contrast to the construction of typical pop or jazz compositions, it skips along beautifully with no repeats. The last eight bars however form a type of repeat to finish the melodic line. Williams praised its ingenious and delightful melody. Brian Priestley in his biography of Parker, Chasin' the Bird: The Life and Legacy of Charlie Parker, writes that the first eight, the middle eight and the last eight bars are extremely closely related and finds that "it is instructive how one small difference necessitates another small difference which necessitates yet another small difference" in order to "maintain a perfect balance".

Ted Gioia included "Confirmation" in his 2012 analysis of jazz standards, The Jazz Standards: A Guide to the Repertoire. Gioia wrote that he marvels at "a piece that can sound so highly structured and spontaneous at the same time". Gioia wrote that "Confirmation" and Parker's "Donna Lee" could "almost serve a primer in modern jazz phrase construction".

The jazz singer Sheila Jordan sang a vocal version of "Confirmation", with lyrics by Skeeter Spight and Leroy Mitchell. Thelonious Monk would give his prospective piano students "Confirmation" and tell them to learn it in different keys.

== Relation to song 'Twilight Time' ==
"Confirmation" is a partial contrafact of the 1944 song "Twilight Time" by Al Nevins and Buck Ram. Both pieces use an "AABA" thirty-two bar form, and the "A" sections of "Confirmation" closely match the chord progression of "Twilight Time." For the "B" section, Parker wrote his own chord changes that depart significantly from those of the "B" section of "Twilight Time."

== Partial list of recordings ==
- Art Blakey with Clifford Brown and Lou Donaldson – A Night at Birdland Vol. 2 (Blue Note, 1954)
- Dexter Gordon – Daddy Plays the Horn (Bethlehem, 1955)
- Gene Ammons – Boss Tenor (Prestige, 1960)
- Oscar Peterson – The London House Sessions (Polygram, 1961)
- George Russell – George Russell Sextet at Beethoven Hall (MPS, 1965)
- Jackie McLean – 4, 5 and 6 (Prestige, 1956), Live at Montmartre (SteepleChase, 1972)
- Warne Marsh – The Unissued Copenhagen Studio Recordings (Storyville, 1975, issued 1997)
- John Lewis – Statements and Sketches for Development (Sony, 1976)
- The Modern Jazz Quartet – Last Concert (Atlantic, 1974)
- Tommy Flanagan – Confirmation (Enja, 1976)
- Joe Albany – Bird Lives (Interplay, 1979)
- Ron Carter – Carnaval (Galaxy, 1983)
- George Shearing and Hank Jones – The Spirit of 176 (Concord, 1988)
- Charlie Parker & Dizzy Gillespie – Diz 'N Bird At Carnegie Hall (Roost, 1997)
- Bud Powell – Bud Plays Bird (Blue Note, 1997)
- Al Haig – Un Poco Loco (Spotlite, 1999)

== See also ==
- List of 1940s jazz standards
