= Moose the Mooche =

1946 jazz composition by Charlie Parker

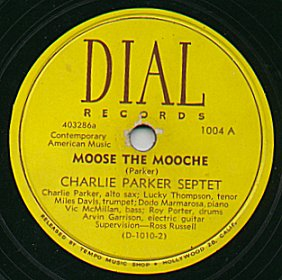
"Moose the Mooche". Dial Records label of a 78 rpm gramophone record by the Charlie Parker Septet.

"Moose the Mooche" is a bebop composition written by Charlie Parker in 1946. It was written shortly after his friend and longtime musical companion Dizzy Gillespie left him in Los Angeles to return to New York City. Parker had been a long time heroin addict. Some historians suggest that the song was named after the drug dealer, Emry "Moose the Mooche" Byrd, who sold him drugs for several years before being arrested.

Parker recorded it in Los Angeles for Dial on March 28, 1946, as the Charlie Parker Septet, accompanied by Miles Davis, Lucky Thompson and Dodo Marmarosa, who were performing with Parker at the Finale Club, Vic McMillan (who was brought in at the last minute when the original bassist, Red Callender, quit), Arvin Garrison and Roy Porter.

== Analysis ==
This composition is in the key of B-flat and has a 32-bar AABA structure. The chord progression is based on the "I Got Rhythm" changes and makes extensive use of the ii-V-I turnaround. Typical of many bebop compositions, "Moose the Mooche" is played at a fast tempo (Quarter Note = 224).

== Covers ==
Over the years the song has gained considerable fame and has become a bebop standard. Among the artists that have covered it are Dizzy Gillespie, Bud Powell, Hank Jones, Joshua Redman, Jay Thomas, Phish, Sadao Watanabe, and Stevie Wonder.

== See also ==
- List of jazz contrafacts
