= Deep Night =

Jazz standard

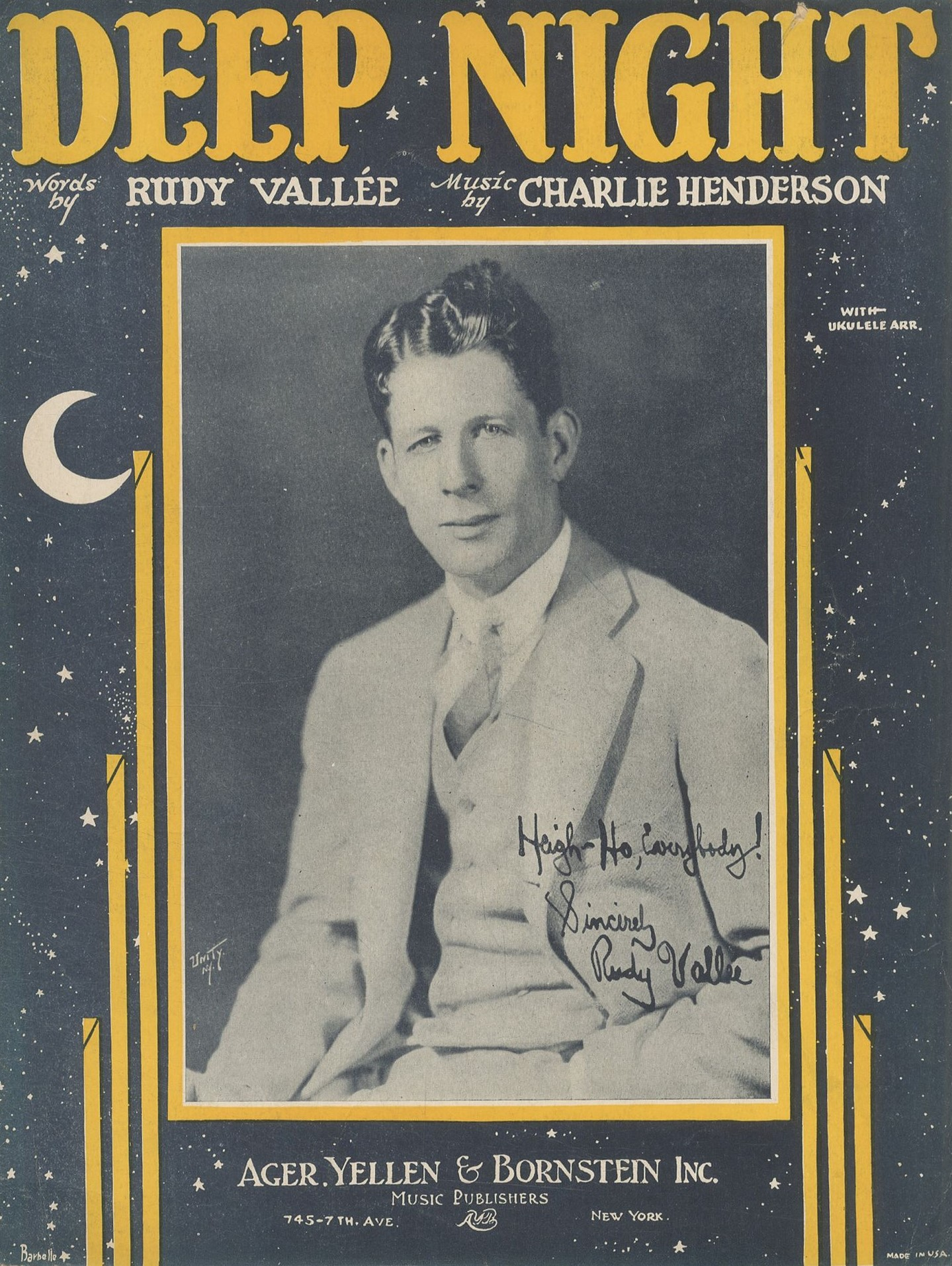
- Sheet music cover, 1929

Song by Rudy Vallee
- Published: 1929 by Ager, Yellen, and Bornstein
- Released: 1929
- Label: RCA Victor
- Songwriters: Charles E. Henderson and Rudy Vallee

"Deep Night"
Performed by Rudy Vallée and his Connecticut Yankees in 1929

"Deep Night" is a song and jazz standard with a melody composed in 1929 by Charles E. Henderson and lyrics written by Rudy Vallee. The tune is written in a minor key.

== History ==
The song was first recorded in 1929 by Vallee with The Connecticut Yankees, as the B side of his song "Weary River". These were the first recordings Vallee made for RCA Victor. Popular recordings in 1929 were those by Vallee and by Ruth Etting.

== Recorded versions ==
It has been covered by many jazz musicians notably:

- Sonny Clark in his album Cool Struttin'
- Bud Powell
- Art Tatum
- Buddy DeFranco.

It has also been recorded by vocalists, including:

- Frank Sinatra with Harry James in 1951 on Columbia 39527,
- Tony Martin on his 1949 album You, and the Night, and the Music ...
- Vic Damone for his 1962 album Linger Awhile with Vic Damone
- Ann Richards on her 1958 album I'm Shooting High
- Barbara Rosene on her album of the same name.

Additionally, inventor Leon Theremin recorded an instrumental performance of the song on his own instrument, the Theremin, in 1930.

== Popular culture ==
Deep Night was also part of the sound track of the films My Own Private Idaho, "Tomorrow Is Another Day" and Bonnie and Clyde. and features in the Score of Matthew Bourne's 2021 dance theatre work 'The Midnight Bell'.
