= Star Eyes (song) =

1943 song by Gene de Paul & Don Raye

Single by Jimmy Dorsey and His Orchestra
- A-side: "They're Either Too Young Or Too Old"
- Released: 1943
- Recorded: October 7, 1943
- Genre: Traditional pop
- Length: 3:08
- Label: Decca
- Composer: Gene de Paul
- Lyricist: Don Raye

"Star Eyes" is a song from the 1943 film I Dood It, written by Gene de Paul and Don Raye. It was performed in the film by Helen O'Connell and Bob Eberly accompanied by Jimmy Dorsey's orchestra. Jimmy Dorsey was the first to release the song.

== Other recordings ==
Charlie Parker recorded "Star Eyes" in 1951 for Verve Records. Owing to Parker's influence, the song has become a popular vehicle for jazz musicians and is considered a jazz standard. It has been recorded by Johnny Mathis, Carmen McRae, Sarah Vaughan, Art Pepper, Lee Konitz, Lennie Niehaus, Donald Byrd, Bud Powell, Tina Brooks, Milt Jackson, Bill Evans, McCoy Tyner, Chet Baker, Sonny Stitt, Dexter Gordon, Freddie Hubbard, Cannonball Adderley, Joni James, Dick Hyman & Mary Mayo, Anita O'Day, and Chris Potter, among others.

== Film appearances ==
The song first appeared in the 1943 MGM film I Dood It performed by Jimmy Dorsey and His Orchestra. His recording was released as a s78 single on Decca Records.

== See also ==
- List of 1940s jazz standards
