= Tempus Fugue-it =

Jazz composition by Bud Powell

"Tempus Fugit"

Song by Bud Powell

from the album Jazz Giant
- Released: 1956
- Recorded: 1949
- Genre: Bebop
- Label: Verve
- Composer(s): Bud Powell
- Producer(s): Norman Granz

"Tempus Fugue-it" (also known as "Tempus Fugit") is a 1949 jazz composition by jazz pianist Bud Powell (1924–1966). It has been recorded by Powell, Miles Davis and many others.

The song is not actually a fugue in compositional form; its title is a pun on the Latin phrase tempus fugit, meaning "time flies". The name is also a reflection of the speed at which the piece is played.

Financial Times critic Mike Hobart described the composition as a "modernist masterpiece".

== History ==
The original was recorded in 1949 with bassist Ray Brown and drummer Max Roach for the album Jazz Giant. Powell's composition "Celia" was probably recorded at the same session. Powell played the tune on record once more, in 1963 during his home recordings with Francis Paudras.
