= Bean and the Boys =

"Bean and the Boys" is a bebop composition written in 1948 by the American jazz tenor saxophonist Coleman Hawkins. It is a contrafact of "Lover Come Back to Me".

The composition has been covered by numerous artists including notable recordings by Barry Harris, Bill Mays, Art Blakey, Jackie McLean, Bud Powell, and Tommy Flanagan.

== Covered ==
- Barry Harris Magnificent (1969)
- Bill Mays, Bick's Bag (2004)

== See also ==
- List of jazz contrafacts
