= Like Someone in Love =

Song by Jimmy Van Heusen and Johnny Burke

Composition by Dinah Shore
- Composer: Jimmy Van Heusen
- Lyricist: Johnny Burke

"Like Someone in Love" is a popular song composed in 1944 by Jimmy Van Heusen, with lyrics by Johnny Burke. It was written (along with "Sleigh Ride in July") for the 1944 film, Belle of the Yukon, where it was sung by Dinah Shore. It was a hit for Bing Crosby in March 1945, reaching number 15 in the charts, and has since become a jazz standard.

== Björk version ==
For Björk's debut album, Debut (1993), she recorded a rendition of the track "Like Someone in Love". Björk's interpretation is sparse, only featuring her lead vocals, harp, and street noise.

=== Personnel ===
Adapted from liner notes

- Björk – lead vocals
- Corky Hale – harp
