= Return to Birdland, 64 =

- Earl Bud Powell, Vol. 9

Live album by Earl Bud Powell
- Released: 1989
- Recorded: September 30, 1964
- Venue: Birdland, NYC
- Genre: Bebop
- Length: 61:03
- Label: Mythic Sound

Bud Powell chronology
Holidays in Edenville, 64 (1989)	Return to Birdland, 64 (1989)	Award at Birdland, 64 (1989)

Return to Birdland, 64, also known as Earl Bud Powell, Vol. 9, is a live album by American jazz pianist Bud Powell, recorded at Birdland on September 30, 1964 and was released by Mythic Sound in 1989. Powell's trio features rhythm section John Ore and J. C. Moses.

== Recording and production ==
Francis Paudras wrote in his book Dance of the Infidels that he recorded Powell's Birdland sessions using a bootleg microphone he attached to the club's piano microphone. This enabled Powell to cue the song titles directly to Paudras to record. At one point Powell had to ask over the microphone what tune he was playing in the middle of his solo, as he suffered from severe amnesia at the time.

== Reception ==
The Penguin Guide to Jazz wrote positively of the album, rating it 4 out of 4 stars and praising its "quiet joy."

Professional ratings
Review scores
Source	Rating
The Penguin Guide to Jazz	4/4 stars

== Track listing ==
1. "The Best Thing for You" (Irving Berlin)
2. "'Round Midnight" (Thelonious Monk)
3. "I Want to Be Happy" (Vincent Youmans, Irving Caesar)
4. "Polka Dots and Moonbeams" (Jimmy Van Heusen, Johnny Burke)
5. "Wee" (Denzil Best)
6. "Body and Soul" (Johnny Green, Edward Heyman, Robert Sour, Frank Eyton)
7. "That Old Black Magic" (Harold Arlen, Johnny Mercer)
8. "Hallucinations"
9. "It Could Happen to You" (Van Heusen, Burke)
10. "Lullaby of Birdland" (George Shearing)
11. "Buttercup"
12. "Conception" (Shearing, Powell)

== Personnel ==
- Bud Powell – piano
- John Ore – bass
- J. C. Moses – drums
