= Dizzy Digs Paris =

Album by Dizzy Gillespie

Compilation album by Dizzy Gillespie
- Released: 2006
- Recorded: February 9, 1953 at the Salle Pleyel, February 22, 1953 at the Studio Pathe Magellan and February 27, 1953 in Paris, France
- Genre: Jazz
- Label: Giant Steps

Dizzy Gillespie chronology
The Great Blue Star Sessions 1952-1953 (1952–53)	Dizzy Digs Paris (2006)	Jazz at Massey Hall (1953)

Dizzy Digs Paris is a compilation album by trumpeter Dizzy Gillespie and his band featuring concert and studio performances recorded in Paris in 1953 and originally released on the French Disques Vogue and Blue Star labels. Many of the tracks were first released as 78 rpm records but were later released on albums including Dizzy Over Paris (Roost) and Dizzy Gillespie and His Operatic Strings Orchestra (Fontana). The album also includes eight tracks recorded by Dizzy's rhythm section led by Wade Legge but without Gillespie that were originally released on a 10" album.

== Reception ==
The Allmusic review stated "As a whole, the two-CD set might not be a major entry in the Gillespie discography, but it's a good one. And it's certainly hard to imagine a more complete package of this 1953 Salle Pleyel concert, complemented as it is by studio material recorded by the same musicians at the same time and place".

Professional ratings
Review scores
Source	Rating
Allmusic	4.5/5 stars

== Track listing ==
All compositions by Dizzy Gillespie except as indicated

Disc One:

1. "Intro (Rehearsal Blues)" – 1:31
2. "The Champ" – 9:22
3. "Good Bait" (Tadd Dameron, Count Basie) – 9.50
4. "Swing Low, Sweet Cadillac" – 4:10
5. "Ghost of a Chance" (Bing Crosby, Ned Washington, Victor Young) –
6. "Lady Be Good" (George Gershwin, Ira Gershwin) – 3:50
7. "Mon Homme" (Jacques Charles, Channing Pollock, Albert Willemetz, Maurice Yvain) – 2:53
8. "(I've Got) The Bluest Blues" (Gary McFarland, Sir Charles Thompson) – 3:51
9. "Birks' Works" – 9:36
10. "Ooh-Shoo-Be-Doo-Be" (Gillespie, Joe Carroll, Bill Graham) – 3:28
11. "They Can't Take That Away From Me" (Gershwin, Gershwin) –
12. "Embraceable You" (Gershwin, Gershwin) – 3:06
13. "Play Fiddle Play" (Arthur Altman, Jack Lawrence, Emery Deutsch) – 3:16
14. "I Can't Get Started" (Ira Gershwin, Vernon Duke) – 4:29
15. "Tin Tin Deo" (Gillespie, Chano Pozo) – 4:11
16. "On The Sunny Side of the Street" (Dorothy Fields, Jimmy McHugh) –

Disc Two:

1. "School Days" (Will D. Cobb, Gus Edwards) – 7:04
2. "Undecided" (Sid Robin, Charlie Shavers) – 2:34
3. "The Way You Look Tonight" (Dorothy Fields, Jerome Kern) – 4:16
4. "Always" (Irving Berlin) – 2:58
5. "Mon Homme" (Charles, Pollock, Willemetz, Yvain) – 2:41
6. "Clappin' Rhythm" – 2:15
7. "Fais Gaffe (Watch Out) – 3:58
8. "Moon Nocture" – 2:27
9. "This Is the Way" – 2:35
10. "'S Wonderful" (Gershwin, Gershwin) – 3:16
11. "Oo-Bla-Dee" (Milt Orent, Mary Lou Williams) – 3:03
12. "Stormy Weather" (Harold Arlen, Ted Koehler) – 3:51
13. "Jalousie" (Vera Bloom, Jacob Gade) – 2:36
14. "The Very Thought of You" (Ray Noble) – 2:37
15. "Fine and Dandy" (Paul James, Kay Swift) – 3:44
16. "I've Got You Under My Skin" (Porter) – 2:24
17. "Pennies from Heaven" (Johnny Burke, Arthur Johnston) – 2:25
18. "Perdido" (Juan Tizol) – 3:08
19. "Dream a Little Dream of Me" (Fabian Andre, Wilbur Schwandt, Gus Kahn) – 3:16
20. "Wade Legge's Blues" (Wade Legge) – 3:44
21. "A Swedish Folk Song" (Traditional) – 3:11
22. "Dance Of The Infidels" (Bud Powell) – 3:14
23. "Aren't You Glad You're You" (Jimmy Van Heusen, Johnny Burke) – 3:15
24. "These Foolish Things" (Harry Link, Holt Marvell, Jack Strachey) – 2:52
25. "Why Don't You Believe Me?" (Lew Douglas, King Laney, Roy Rodde) – 2:52

Recorded on February 9, 1953, at the Salle Pleyel (Disc One and Disc Two, track 1) and on February 22, 1953, at the Studio Pathe Magellan (Disc Two, tracks 2–17) and February 27, 1953 (Disc Two, tracks 18–25), in Paris, France

== Personnel ==
- Dizzy Gillespie – trumpet, piano, vocals, congas (Disc One and Disc Two, tracks 1–17)
- Nat Peck – trombone (Disc Two, tracks 4–11)
- Bill Graham – alto saxophone, baritone saxophone (Disc One and Disc Two, track 1)
- Wade Legge – piano
- Lou Hackney – bass
- Al Jones – drums
- Joe Carroll, Sarah Vaughan – vocals (Disc One, track 12, Disc Two, track 1)
- The Paris Operatic String Orchestra arranged by Michel Legrand (Disc Two, tracks 2, 3 & 12–16)
