= Relaxin' at Home, 61–64 =

- Earl Bud Powell, Vol. 4

Studio album by Bud Powell, Michel Gaudry, and Francis Paudras
- Released: 1989
- Recorded: 1961–1964
- Studio: Francis Paudras' home
- Genre: Jazz
- Label: Mythic Sound
- Producer: Francis Paudras

Bud Powell chronology
Early Years of a Genius, 44–48 (1989)	Relaxin' at Home, 61–64 (1989)	Holidays in Edenville, 64 (1989)

Relaxin' at Home, 61–64, also known as Earl Bud Powell, Vol. 4, is an album by jazz pianist Bud Powell, released in 1989 from material recorded by Powell, bassist Michel Gaudry, and Francis Paudras at Paudras' home in Paris between 1961 and 1964.

== Reception ==
Jazz critic Scott Yanow noted, "Powell is heard playing solo piano quite loosely at Francis Paudras's home, the recording quality is erratic and (despite some creative outburtsts) some of the selections are throwaways."

The Penguin Guide to Jazz awarded the album three of four stars and noted, "Paudras scuffs out a brush rhythm over Powell's unselfconscious improvisations."

Professional ratings
Review scores
Source	Rating
AllMusic	1.5/5 stars
The Penguin Guide to Jazz	3/4 stars

== Track listing ==
All compositions by Bud Powell unless otherwise noted

1. "The Christmas Song" (Robert Wells, Mel Tormé) – 5:02
2. "Groovin' High" (Dizzy Gillespie) – 2:58
3. "Yeheadeadeadee" – 4:07
4. "La Marseillaise" (traditional) – 0:38
5. "In The Stage Door Canteen" – 2:28
6. "Monopoly" – 2:25
7. "Darn That Dream" (Jimmy Van Heusen) – 2:36
8. "Crossin' The Channel" – 1:32
9. "Lady Bird" (Tadd Dameron) – 3:40
10. "Conception" (George Shearing, Powell) – 2:57
11. "Relaxin' At Camarillo" (Charlie Parker) – 1:14
12. "Celia" – 2:34
13. "Gone With The Wind" (Allie Wrubel, Herb Magidson) – 3:50
14. "I Know That You Know" – 2:08
15. "How High The Moon" (Nancy Hamilton, Morgan Lewis) / "Ornithology" (Parker, Benny Harris) – 3:00
16. "Una Noche con Francis" – 3:51
17. "In The Mood For A Classic" – 3:15
18. "I Wanna Blow Now" – 1:57
19. "Lady Bird" (Dameron) (alternate take 1) – 2:07
20. "Lady Bird" (Dameron) (alternate take 2) – 2:17
21. "Be-Bop" (Gillespie) – 2:34

== Personnel ==
- Bud Powell – piano, vocals
- Michael Gaudry – bass (16–18)
- Francis Paudras – brushes (2, 5–6, 8–13, 16–18)
