= Una Noche con Francis =

Calypso jazz composition

"Una Noche con Francis", originally titled "Un Noche con Francis", is a calypso jazz composition written by Bud Powell in 1964 and dedicated to jazz fan and amateur musician Francis Paudras.

== History ==
Like his earlier composition "Un Poco Loco," Powell's "Una Noche con Francis" is written to an Afro-Cuban rhythm, hence its Spanish-language title. The pianist was in the process of being released from Bouffemont Sanitorium at the time of its writing. First recorded by Powell's trio for the 1964 album Blues for Bouffemont/The Invisible Cage shortly before his return to the United States, the tune was used for the soundtrack of Bertrand Tavernier's film 'Round Midnight.

On the original recording for the album Relaxin' at Home, 61–64, which preserved conversations that took place between the tunes, Powell titled the composition "Un Noche con Francis", but subsequent releases gave the piece its current, grammatically correct title.

On the soundtrack album, arranged by pianist Herbie Hancock and released in its own right, tenor saxophonists Wayne Shorter and Dexter Gordon traded solos over the theme.

== Notable recordings ==
- Relaxin' at Home with Bud Powell, bassist Michel Gaudry, and Francis Paudras
- The Invisible Cage with Powell, Gaudry, and drummer Art Taylor
- Round Midnight (soundtrack) with Dexter Gordon, Wayne Shorter, Herbie Hancock, Pierre Michelot, and Billy Higgins
