= Strictly Powell =

Studio album by Bud Powell
- Released: 1957
- Recorded: October 5, 1956
- Genre: Jazz
- Length: 39:59
- Label: RCA Victor

Bud Powell chronology
Bud Powell Trio (1957)	Strictly Powell (1957)	Bud! (1957)

Professional ratings
Review scores
Source	Rating
Allmusic	4/5 stars

Strictly Powell is a studio album by jazz pianist Bud Powell, released in 1957 by RCA Victor, featuring a session Powell recorded in 1956.

The album was remastered and released on CD by BMG Japan in 1994, and re-issued by RCA in 1995. The session is also available on The Complete RCA Trio Sessions.

== History ==
This is the first of Powell's two sessions for RCA Victor. There are four new Powell compositions (not counting "Elegy" which two weeks previously had been recorded as "Elogie" for his final Verve session, released on Blues in the Closet), and in the original LP liner notes Leonard Feather marks out "Blues for Bessie" as "the most remarkable ... a completely spontaneous improvisation from start to finish". Concerning "Elegy", Feather notes that it "scales up and down little ladders of fourths".

Marc Myers criticized the negative stance of some critics toward the album and its successor Blues in the Closet, writing that "[m]any people who write about these RCA trio sessions go out of their way to note that Powell was no longer at the height of his playing powers. Hogwash, I say. While Powell here may lack the ferocious snap of his late-'40s recordings for Prestige or the grandiose breadth on his Verve sessions, the RCA material is plenty taut, engaging and creative."

== Track listing ==
All songs were written by Bud Powell, except where noted.

1. "There Will Never Be Another You" (Harry Warren, Mack Gordon) – 3:39
2. "Coscrane" – 3:44
3. "Over the Rainbow" (Harold Arlen, E.Y. "Yip" Harburg) – 3:20
4. "Blues for Bessie" – 5:40
5. "Time Was" (aka "Duerme" «Sleep») (Miguel Prado, Gabriel Luna, Bob Russell) – 3:07
1. "Topsy Turvy" – 4:36
2. "Lush Life" (Billy Strayhorn) – 2:53
3. "Elegy" (aka "Elogie" and "Elegie") – 3:49
4. "They Didn't Believe Me" (Jerome Kern) – 3:18
5. "I Cover the Waterfront" (Johnny Green, Edward Heyman) – 2:32
6. "Jump City" – 3:21

== Personnel ==
=== Performance ===
October 5, 1956, New York. The Bud Powell Trio.

- Bud Powell – piano
- George Duvivier – bass
- Art Taylor – drums

=== Production ===
- Burt Goldblatt – cover design & photo
- Ikuyoshi Hirakawa – producer (1994 CD release)
- Leonard Feather – liner notes
- Cliff Preiss – liner notes (1995 CD release)
- Tohru Kotetsu – remastering (1994 CD release)
