= Dee Gee Days: The Savoy Sessions =

Compilation album by Dizzy Gillespie
- Released: 1976
- Recorded: March 1, April 16, August 16 and October 25, 1951 in New York City July 18, 1952 in Chicago
- Genre: Jazz
- Length: 72:20
- Label: Savoy; SJL 2209

Dizzy Gillespie chronology
Bird and Diz (1952)	Dee Gee Days: The Savoy Sessions (1976)	The Great Blue Star Sessions 1952-1953 (2004)

Dee Gee Days: The Savoy Sessions is a compilation album by trumpeter Dizzy Gillespie featuring performances recorded in 1951 and 1952 and originally released on Gillespie's own Dee Gee Records label. Many of the tracks were first released as 78 rpm records but were later released on albums including School Days (Regent) and The Champ (Savoy).

== Reception ==
Professional ratings
Review scores
Source	Rating
Allmusic	4/5 stars
The Rolling Stone Jazz Record Guide	4/5 stars

The Allmusic review stated "Instrumentally concise, always with a harmonic depth and technical brilliance that punctuates bebop, and a recording technology enhanced from the '40s, Dee Gee Days will stand forever as one of the most important albums in jazz history, and belongs in every serious – or whimsical – jazz lover's collection – period!"

== Track listing ==
All compositions by Dizzy Gillespie except as indicated

1. "Tin Tin Deo" (Gillespie, Gil Fuller, Chano Pozo) – 2:43
2. "Birks' Works" – 3:07
3. "We Love to Boogie" – 2:53
4. "Oh, Lady Be Good!" (George Gershwin, Ira Gershwin) – 2:42
5. "Love Me Pretty Baby" (Kenny Clarke) – 3:03
6. "The Champ" – 5:39
7. "I'm In a Mess" (A. White, P. White) – 2:13
8. "School Days" (Will D. Cobb, Gus Edwards) – 3:09
9. "Swing Low Sweet Cadillac" – 3:10
10. "Bopsie's Blues" [alternate take] – 3:16
11. "Bopsie's Blues" – 2:34
12. "I Couldn't Beat the Rap" – 2:56
13. "Caravan" [alternate take] (Juan Tizol) – 2:56
14. "Caravan" (Tizol) – 2:54
15. "Nobody Knows" (Clarke) – 2:40
16. "The Bluest Blues" (Gary McFarland, Sir Charles Thompson) – 2:55
17. "On the Sunny Side of the Street" (Dorothy Fields, Jimmy McHugh) – 3:08
18. "Stardust" (Hoagy Carmichael) – 3:03
19. "Time on My Hands" (Vincent Youmans, Harold Adamson, Mack Gordon) – 2:24
20. "Blue Skies" (Irving Berlin) – 2:19
21. "Umbrella Man" (James Cavanaugh, Vincent Rose, Larry Stock) – 2:26
22. "Confessin' (Pop's)" (Doc Daugherty, Ellis Reynolds) – 3:33
23. "Ooh-Shoo-Be-Doo-Bee" (Gillespie, Joe Carroll, Bill Graham) – 3:21
24. "They Can't Take That Away from Me" (Gershwin, Gershwin) – 3:45

Recorded in New York City on March 1 (tracks 1–3), April 16 (tracks 4–6), August 16 (tracks 7–12), October 25 (tracks 13–19), 1951 and in Chicago on July 18 (tracks 20–24), 1952

== Personnel ==
- Dizzy Gillespie – trumpet, vocals
- John Coltrane – alto saxophone, tenor saxophone (tracks 1–3)
- Budd Johnson – tenor saxophone (tracks 4–6)
- Bill Graham – baritone saxophone (tracks 7–24)
- J. J. Johnson – trombone (tracks 4–6)
- Stuff Smith – violin (tracks 13, 14 & 17–19)
- Kenny Burrell – guitar (tracks 1–3)
- Wynton Kelly – piano (tracks 20–24)
- Milt Jackson – piano, vibes (tracks 1–19)
- Bernie Griggs (tracks 20–24), Percy Heath (tracks 1–19) – bass
- Art Blakey (tracks 4–6), Kansas Fields (tracks 1–3), Al Jones (tracks: 7–24) – drums
- Joe Carroll (tracks 4, 7, 8, 15–17 & 20–23), Melvin Moore (tracks 5 & 10–12), Freddy Strong (track 3) – vocals
