= The Invisible Cage =

Studio album by Bud Powell
- Released: 1964
- Recorded: July 31, 1964
- Genre: Jazz
- Length: 38:05
- Label: Fontana, Black Lion

Bud Powell chronology
Dizzy Gillespie and the Double Six of Paris (1964)	The Invisible Cage (1964)	The Return of Bud Powell (1964)

The Invisible Cage, also known as Blues for Bouffemont in some releases, is a studio album by jazz pianist Bud Powell with Michael Gaudry on bass and Art Taylor on drums. It was recorded in France shortly before Powell's return to the United States.

== Reception ==
Professional ratings
Review scores
Source	Rating
AllMusic (Ron Wynn)	3/5 stars
AllMusic (Scott Yanow)	2.5/5 stars
DownBeat	3.5/5 stars
The Penguin Guide to Jazz	3.5/4 stars
The Rolling Stone Jazz Record Guide	2/5 stars
The Virgin Encyclopedia of Jazz	3/5 stars

In reviews for AllMusic, Ron Wynn described the music as "teeming, sometimes ragged but always blistering," while Scott Yanow noted that the album is "better than expected and probably [Powell's] last worthwhile recording."

A reviewer for Billboard stated that Powell "sounds alive and well" on the album, and commented: "His two-handed explorations are much of what bebop was all about."

Trevor Tolley of Coda remarked: "The fingering is bad: even when he hits the right notes, there is a lack of control of tone and emphasis."

Jon Balleras of DownBeat gave a mixed review, recommending "Like Someone in Love" and "Blues for Bouffemont" but criticizing the fingering of the uptempo tunes.

== Track listing ==
All compositions by Bud Powell unless otherwise indicated

1. "Blues for Bouffemont" – 5:44
2. "In the Mood for a Classic" – 5:42
3. "Like Someone in Love" (Johnny Burke, James Van Heusen) – 7:04
4. "Little Willie Leaps" (Miles Davis) – 4:08
5. "My Old Flame" (Sam Coslow, Arthur Johnston) – 4:15
6. "Moose the Mooche" (Charlie Parker) – 3:42
7. "Una Noche con Francis" – 4:04
8. "Relaxin' at Camarillo" (Parker) – 4:23

== Personnel ==
- Bud Powell – piano
- Michael Gaudry – bass
- Art Taylor – drums
