= Bud on Bach =

Song by Bud Powell

from the album Bud!
- Released: 1957
- Recorded: August 3, 1957
- Studio: Van Gelder Studio
- Genre: Jazz
- Length: 2:30
- Label: Blue Note
- Composer(s): Bud Powell
- Producer(s): Alfred Lion

"Bud on Bach" is a composition written by jazz pianist Bud Powell for his 1957 album Bud!, also known as The Amazing Bud Powell, Vol. 3. It is unusual among jazz compositions for being based upon Solfeggietto, a composition by Carl Philipp Emanuel Bach.

== History ==
Powell first recorded the composition in August 1957 for Blue Note Records, opening the track with the original Solfegietto as an introduction to his own composition based on the chords. He played the composition solo, doing without his customary trio in order to contrast the Solfegietto's speed with his own "sparse" improvisation. Of the composition, Guthrie Ramsey, author of The Amazing Bud Powell: Black Genius, Jazz History, and the Challenge of Bebop wrote: "Compressed into two minutes and thirty-one seconds, the recording traverses a couple of sound worlds and, for many, is evidence of Powell’s dual pedigree in classical music and black popular music."

== Reception ==
Dom Cerulli of DownBeat praised the album Bud!, awarding it 4 1/2 stars. He wrote most highly of "Bud on Bach", noting, "it’s Bud on Bach that is bound to be THE track in the set. On this, Bud displays such artistry and such genuine genius, that it may well stand among the classic examples of his work in the years to come."
