= 'Round About Midnight at the Blue Note =

Live album by Bud Powell
- Released: 1994
- Recorded: 1961 or 1962
- Venue: Le Blue Note, Paris
- Genre: Jazz
- Length: 35:18
- Label: Dreyfus

Bud Powell chronology
| Award at Birdland (1989) | 'Round About Midnight at the Blue Note (1994) | The Best of Bud Powell on Verve (1994) |

Professional ratings
Review scores
| Source | Rating |
|---|---|
| AllMusic | 3/5 stars |
| The Penguin Guide to Jazz | 3.5/4 stars |

'Round About Midnight at the Blue Note is a 1962 live album by Bud Powell and his Three Bosses Trio, with Pierre Michelot on bass and Kenny Clarke on drums, that was released in 1994 by Dreyfus Records. According to Allmusic, the album was recorded in 1962, but ESP-Disk and The Penguin Guide to Jazz dated the recording as 1961.

== Track listing ==
1. "Shaw 'Nuff" (Ray Brown, Dizzy Gillespie) – 4:14
2. "Lover Man" (Jimmy Davis, Roger Ramirez, Jimmy Sherman) – 2:58
3. "There Will Never Be Another You" (Mack Gordon, Harry Warren) – 6:27
4. "Monk's Mood" (Thelonious Monk) – 3:53
5. "A Night in Tunisia" (Gillespie) – 7:04
6. "'Round Midnight" (Monk, Cootie Williams) – 6:00
7. "Thelonious" (Monk) – 3:44
8. "52nd Street Theme" (Monk) – 0:58

== Personnel ==
=== Performance ===
- Bud Powell – piano
- Pierre Michelot – bass
- Kenny Clarke – drums

=== Production ===
- Francis Paudras – liner notes
- Yves Chamberland – producer
- Bernard Beaugendre – design
