= Bud! =

Studio album by the Amazing Bud Powell
- Released: 1957
- Recorded: August 3, 1957
- Genre: Jazz
- Length: 43:28
- Label: Blue Note; BLP 1571
- Producer: Alfred Lion

The Amazing Bud Powell chronology
Strictly Powell (1957)	Bud! (1957)	Blues in the Closet (1958)

Professional ratings
Review scores
Source	Rating
AllMusic	4.5/5 stars
DownBeat	4.5/5 stars
The Penguin Guide to Jazz Recordings	3/4 stars

Bud!, also known as The Amazing Bud Powell, Vol. 3, is a studio album by American jazz pianist Bud Powell recorded at the Rudy Van Gelder Studio in Hackensack, New Jersey on August 3, 1957, and released on Blue Note later that year. Powell is backed by rhythm section Paul Chambers and Art Taylor, with guest appearances from trombonist Curtis Fuller on three tracks. Most of the tracks on the album were recorded in one or two takes, according to Chambers.

== Release history ==
The album was first released in 1957 as a 12" LP.

In 1989, the album was digitally remastered and released on CD featuring an extra alternate take of "Blue Pearl", and with the tracks listed in session chronological order. The version of the album included on the third disc of The Complete Blue Note and Roost Recordings, a 4 disc box set, is the same as the first CD release in 1989.

The album was digitally remastered in 2001 by Rudy Van Gelder and re-issued in January, 2002 as part of Blue Note's The RVG Edition series. The track listing was changed back to the original LP order, with the alternate take of "Blue Pearl" following.

== Reception ==
Dom Cerulli of DownBeat recommended the album, noting, "Bud displays such artistry and such genuine genius, that it may well stand among the classic examples of his work in the years to come." He described "Bud on Bach" as "THE track in the set."

== Track listing ==
=== Original release ===
All tracks are written by Bud Powell, except as noted.

Side 1
No.	Title	Length
1.	"Some Soul"	6:56
2.	"Blue Pearl"	3:46
3.	"Frantic Fancies"	4:50
4.	"Solfeggietto" / "Bud on Bach"	2:30
5.	"Keepin' in the Groove"	2:53

Side 2
No.	Title	Writer(s)	Length
1.	"Idaho"	Jesse Stone	5:14
2.	"Don't Blame Me"	Jimmy McHugh; Dorothy Fields	7:31
3.	"Moose the Mooche"	Charlie Parker	5:45

=== 1989 CD reissue ===
No.	Title	Writer(s)	Length
1.	"Blue Pearl"		3:46
2.	"Blue Pearl" (alternate take)		4:03
3.	"Keepin' in the Groove"		2:53
4.	"Some Soul"		6:56
5.	"Frantic Fancies"		4:50
6.	"Bud on Bach"		2:30
7.	"Idaho"	Stone	5:14
8.	"Don't Blame Me"	McHugh; Fields	7:31
9.	"Moose the Mooche"	Parker	5:45

- The 2001 RVG edition preserves the original track listing, placing the "Blue Pearl" alternate take at the end.

== Personnel ==
=== Musicians ===
- Bud Powell – piano
- Curtis Fuller – trombone ("Idaho", "Don't Blame Me", "Moose the Mooche")
- Paul Chambers – bass (except "Bud on Bach")
- Art Taylor – drums (except "Bud on Bach")

=== Technical personnel ===
==== Original ====
- Alfred Lion – producer, original session producer
- Rudy Van Gelder – recording engineer, mastering
- Reid Miles – design
- Francis Wolff – photography
- Leonard Feather – liner notes

==== Reissue ====
- Michael Cuscuna – producer
- Michael Boland – art direction and design
- Gordan H. Jee – creative direction
- Bob Blumenthal – liner notes
