= Holidays in Edenville, 64 =

- Earl Bud Powell, Vol. 8

Live album by Bud Powell and Johnny Griffin
- Released: 1989
- Recorded: August 8–14, 1964
- Venue: Hotel-Restaurant la Belle Escale, Edenville, France
- Genre: Jazz
- Label: Mythic Sound
- Producer: Francis Paudras

Bud Powell chronology
Relaxin' at Home, 61–64 (1989)	Holidays in Edenville, 64 (1989)	Return to Birdland, 64 (1989)

Holidays in Edenville, 64, also known as Earl Bud Powell, Vol. 8, is a live album by jazz pianist Bud Powell and saxophone player Johnny Griffin recorded in Jullouville, France and released on Francis Paudras' Mythic Sound label. Recordings from the hotel gig, which ran for several nights in August, were also used on the albums Hot House, Salt Peanuts, and on one release of Blues for Bouffemont.

== Critical reception ==
Professional ratings
Review scores
Source	Rating
AllMusic	2.5/5 stars
The Penguin Guide to Jazz	4/4 stars

Critic Scott Yanow praised the album, noting Powell's "strong form" but taking points off the album's rating due to its poor audio quality.

The authors of The Penguin Guide to Jazz Recordings wrote: "the music has a strangely evocative quality, more redolent of a time long gone and a man no longer living than many a professional recording."

== Track listing ==
1. Prelude, Op. 28, No. 20 (Frédéric Chopin) – 1:25
2. "Nice Work if You Can Get It" (George Gershwin, Ira Gershwin) – 2:40
3. "Salt Peanuts" (Kenny Clarke, Dizzy Gillespie) – 3:21
4. "If I Loved You" (Richard Rodgers, Oscar Hammerstein II) – 6:46
5. "Lady Bird" (Tadd Dameron) – 5:23
6. "I Remember Clifford" (Benny Golson) – 7:16
7. "Hot House" (Dameron) – 17:45
8. "Body and Soul" (Johnny Green, Edward Heyman, Robert Sour, Frank Eyton) – 7:36
9. "Well, You Needn't" (Thelonious Monk) – 5:49
10. "Crazy Rhythm" (Irving Caesar, Joseph Meyer, Roger Wolfe Kahn) – 5:39

== Personnel ==
- Johnny Griffin – tenor saxophone (7-8)
- Bud Powell – piano
- Guy Hayat – bass
- Jacques Gervais – drums
