= Bud Powell in Paris =

Studio album by Bud Powell
- Released: January 25, 1964
- Recorded: February 1963
- Genre: Jazz
- Length: 49:21
- Label: Reprise
- Producer: Duke Ellington, Frank Sinatra

Bud Powell chronology
Our Man in Paris (1963)	Bud Powell in Paris (1964)	Dizzy Gillespie and the Double Six of Paris (1964)

Bud Powell in Paris is a studio album by jazz pianist Bud Powell, recorded in Paris for Reprise in February 1963 and released in 1964.

== History ==
The album was produced by Duke Ellington with financial support from Frank Sinatra. Powell played the tune "Satin Doll" by ear after Ellington sang it to him during the session.

Alternates and outtakes from the session were released by Mythic Sound on Earl Bud Powell, Vol. 6: Writin' for Duke, 63.

== Reception ==
Professional ratings
Review scores
Source	Rating
AllMusic	3/5 stars
The Penguin Guide to Jazz	3/4 stars
The Rolling Stone Jazz & Blues Album Guide	3/5 stars
The Virgin Encyclopedia of Jazz	3/5 stars
Scott Yanow	7/10 stars

In a review for AllMusic, Ron Wynn noted Powell's "uneven but often astonishing piano work," and wrote: "the vast majority of selections are performed with flair and conviction."

Writer Ira Gitler commented: "this album stands far above the painful Victors and Verves of the 1954–1956 period and is more like early Powell than the Blue Notes of the late fifties."

A writer for Billboard stated that Powell plays "smoothly and most brightly," and is "capable of conveying the subtlest of jazz moods."

Trevor Tolley of Coda remarked: "On 'How High the Moon' there is plenty of dash, but the fingering is not good... The record pointed to a decided decline."

== Track listing ==
1. "How High the Moon" (Morgan Lewis, Nancy Hamilton) – 3:54
2. "Dear Old Stockholm" (traditional) – 3:53
3. "Body and Soul" (Johnny Green, Edward Heyman, Robert Sour, Frank Eyton) – 6:05
4. "Jor-Du" (Duke Jordan) – 4:18
1. "Reets and I" (Benny Harris) – 3:43
2. "Satin Doll" (Duke Ellington, Billy Strayhorn, Johnny Mercer) – 4:45
3. "Parisian Thoroughfare" (Bud Powell) – 1:56
4. "I Can't Get Started" (Vernon Duke, Ira Gershwin) – 5:40
5. "Little Benny" (aka "Bud's Bubble") (Harris) – 3:31
6. "Indiana" (James Hanley, Ballard MacDonald) – 4:37 (not on original LP)
7. "Blues in B Flat" (aka "B Flat Blues" and "Bud's Blue Bossa") (Powell) – 6:59 (not on original LP)

== Personnel ==
=== Performance ===
- Bud Powell – piano
- Gilbert Rovere – bass
- Kansas Fields – drums

=== Production ===
- Duke Ellington – producer
- Leonard Feather – liner notes
- Donald Leake – cover painting
- Lee Herschberg – digital mastering
