= The Complete RCA Trio Sessions =

Compilation album by Bud Powell
- Released: January 9, 2009
- Recorded: October 5, 1956, February 11, 1957
- Genre: Jazz
- Length: 79:20
- Label: Essential Jazz

Bud Powell chronology
Eternity (2004)	The Complete RCA Trio Sessions (2009)

Professional ratings
Review scores
Source	Rating
Allmusic	(Strictly Powell) (Swingin' with Bud)

The Complete RCA Trio Sessions is a compilation album of the two sessions that jazz pianist Bud Powell recorded for RCA Victor in 1956–57, released in 2009 by Essential Jazz.

The sessions are available individually on the original RCA Victor releases Strictly Powell (1957) and Swingin' with Bud (1958).

== Track listing ==
All songs were written by Bud Powell, except where noted.

1. "There Will Never Be Another You" (Harry Warren, Mack Gordon) – 3:39
2. "Coscrane" – 3:44
3. "Over the Rainbow" (Harold Arlen, E.Y. "Yip" Harburg) – 3:20
4. "Blues for Bessie" – 5:40
5. "Time Was" (a.k.a. "Duerme" «Sleep») (Miguel Prado, Gabriel Luna, Bob Russell) – 3:07
6. "Topsy Turvy" – 4:36
7. "Lush Life" (Billy Strayhorn) – 2:53
8. "Elegy" (a.k.a. "Elogie" and "Elegie") – 3:49
9. "They Didn't Believe Me" (Jerome Kern) – 3:18
10. "I Cover the Waterfront" (Johnny Green, Edward Heyman) – 2:32
11. "Jump City" – 3:21
12. "Another Dozen" (George Duvivier) – 3:30
13. "Like Someone in Love" (Jimmy Van Heusen, Johnny Burke) – 4:59
14. "Salt Peanuts" (Dizzy Gillespie, Kenny Clarke) – 2:24
15. "She" (George Shearing) – 5:11
16. "Swedish Pastry" (Barney Kessel) – 3:19
17. "Shaw 'Nuff" (Gillespie) – 3:18
18. "Oblivion" – 2:34
19. "In the Blue of the Evening" (Tom Adair, Alfonso d'Artega) – 3:27
20. "Get It" – 3:08
21. "Birdland Blues" – 4:22
22. "Midway" – 3:09

== Personnel ==
=== Performance ===
October 5, 1956 tracks 1–11. February 11, 1957 tracks 12–22. The Bud Powell Trio.

- Bud Powell – piano
- George Duvivier – bass
- Art Taylor – drums

=== Production ===
- Charles Boldt – liner notes
