= Early Years of a Genius, 44–48 =

- Earl Bud Powell, Vol. 1

Compilation album by Earl Bud Powell
- Released: 1989
- Recorded: 1944–1948
- Genre: Jazz
- Label: Mythic Sound

Bud Powell chronology
The Essen Jazz Festival Concert (1988)	Early Years of a Genius, 44–48 (1989)	Relaxin' at Home, 61–64 (1989)

Professional ratings
Review scores
Source	Rating
AllMusic	4.5/5 stars

Early Years of a Genius, 44–48, also known as Earl Bud Powell, Vol. 1, is the first of eleven volumes of Bud Powell material released by Francis Paudras on his Mythic Sound label. It features a selection of Powell's early work from 1944 to 1948.

== Track listing ==
1. Introduction by Canada Lee
2. "West End Blues" (King Oliver)
3. "Perdido" [incomplete] (Juan Tizol)
4. "When My Baby Left Me" [incomplete] (Eddie Vinson, Cootie Williams)
5. "Royal Garden Blues" (Spencer Williams, Clarence Williams) – 3:17
6. "Roll 'Em" (Cootie Williams) – 2:54
7. "A-Tisket, A-Tasket" (Ella Fitzgerald, Van Alexander) – 2:49
8. "Do Nothin' Till You Hear From Me" (Duke Ellington, Bob Russell) – 2:34
9. "Smack Me" (a.k.a. "You Talk a Little Trash" and "The Boppers") (Cootie Williams) – 3:07
10. "Air Mail Special" (a.k.a. "Good Enough to Keep") (Charlie Christian, Benny Goodman, Jimmy Mundy)
11. "One O'Clock Jump" [incomplete] (Count Basie)
12. Introduction by Leonard Feather
13. "Perdido" (Tizol)
14. "Indiana" (James Hanley, Ballard MacDonald)
15. "Jumpin' With Symphony Sid" (Lester Young)
16. "I'll Be Seeing You" (Sammy Fain, Irving Kahn)
17. "52nd Street Theme" (Thelonious Monk)
18. "Ornithology" (Charlie Parker, Benny Harris)

== Personnel ==
- Bud Powell – piano (all tracks)

Tracks 1–2. The Canada Lee Show, New York, July 4, 1944

- Cootie Williams – trumpet
- unknown – bass
- Canada Lee – announcer

Tracks 3–5. Radio broadcast from the Apollo Theater or the Savoy Ballroom, New York, ca. January–May, 1944
Tracks 6–11. AFRS "Jubilee" Broadcast, NBC Studios, Hollywood, May 1, 1944

- Ermit V. Perry – trumpet
- Tommy Stevenson – trumpet
- George Treadwell – trumpet
- Cootie Williams – trumpet
- Lammar Wright – trumpet
- Ed Burke – trombone
- Ed Glover – trombone
- Robert Horton – trombone
- Frank Powell – alto sax
- Eddie "Cleanhead" Vinson – alto sax
- Lee Pope – tenor sax
- Sam "The Man" Taylor – tenor sax
- Eddie de Verteuil – baritone sax
- Leroy Kirkland – guitar
- Carl Pruitt – bass
- Sylvester "Vess" Payne – drums
- Ella Fitzgerald – vocals (tracks 7–8 only)
- unknown – announcer (New York only)
- Ernie "Bubbles" Whitman – announcer (Hollywood only)

Tracks 12–14. Radio broadcast from the Royal Roost, New York, December 19, 1948

- Benny Harris – trumpet
- J.J. Johnson – trombone
- Buddy DeFranco – clarinet
- Lee Konitz – alto sax
- Budd Johnson – tenor sax
- Cecil Payne – baritone sax
- Chuck Wayne – guitar
- Nelson Boyd – bass
- Max Roach – drums
- Leonard Feather – announcer

Tracks 15–18. Radio broadcast, Royal Roost, NYC, December 19, 1948

- Tadd Dameron Big Ten & Royal Roost Jam
- Benny Harris, trumpet;
- J.J. Johnson, trombone;
- Buddy DeFranco, clarinet;
- Lee Konitz, alto sax;
- Budd Johnson, tenor sax;
- Cecil Payne, baritone sax;
- Chuck Wayne, guitar;
- Nelson Boyd, bass;
- Max Roach, drums;
- Leonard Feather, announcer.
