= Swingin' with Bud =

Studio album by Bud Powell
- Released: 1958
- Recorded: February 11, 1957
- Genre: Jazz
- Length: 39:21
- Label: RCA Victor

Bud Powell chronology
Blues in the Closet (1958)	Swingin' with Bud (1958)	Time Waits (1958)

Professional ratings
Review scores
Source	Rating
Allmusic	4/5 stars
DownBeat	2.5/5 stars

Swingin' with Bud is a studio album by jazz pianist Bud Powell, released in 1958 by RCA Victor, featuring a session Powell recorded in 1957.

The album was released on CD by RCA in 1995. The session is also available on The Complete RCA Trio Sessions.

== Reception ==
Don Gold of DownBeat remarked, "Powell deserves better representation" and awarded the album 2.5 stars out of five.

== Track listing ==
All songs were written by Bud Powell, except where noted.

1. "Another Dozen" (George Duvivier) – 3:30
2. "'Like someone In Love" – 4:59
3. "Salt Peanuts" (Dizzy Gillespie, Kenny Clarke) – 2:24
4. "She" (George Shearing) – 5:11
5. "Swedish Pastry" (Barney Kessel) – 3:19
1. "Shaw 'Nuff" (Gillespie) – 3:18
2. "Oblivion" – 2:34
3. "In the Blue of the Evening" (Alfonso D'Artega, Tom Adair) – 3:27
4. "Get It" – 3:08
5. "Birdland Blues" – 4:22
6. "Midway" – 3:09

== Personnel ==
February 11, 1957, New York. The Bud Powell Trio.

=== Performance ===
- Bud Powell – piano
- George Duvivier – bass
- Art Taylor – drums

=== Production ===
- Burt Goldblatt – cover design & photo
