= The Return of Bud Powell =

Studio album by Bud Powell
- Released: 1964
- Recorded: September 18, 1964
- Genre: Jazz
- Length: 49:57
- Label: Roulette

Bud Powell chronology
The Invisible Cage (1964)	The Return of Bud Powell (1964)	A Portrait of Thelonious (1965)

The Return of Bud Powell is a studio album by jazz pianist Bud Powell recorded in 1964 and released the same year by Roulette Records. Also on the album were bassist John Ore and drummer J. C. Moses.

Author and pianist Francis Paudras highlighted disagreements between Powell and Moses prior to the session, with the pianist only agreeing to play with Moses on the condition that the volume of the drums be reduced during mixing.

== Reception ==
Professional ratings
Review scores
Source	Rating
AllMusic	3/5 stars
DownBeat	3/5 stars
The Virgin Encyclopedia of Jazz	3/5 stars

A writer for Billboard stated that, on the album, Powell is "just as strong, polished and vibrantly exciting as before," and noted that Ore and Moses "romp along with him."

Trevor Tolley of Coda wrote: "while the fingering is clean and the tone well sustained, the performances are rhythmically limp, and one has the sense at times that the bass and drums are doing their best to fit in, so as to hide the rhythmic uncertainty."

Harvey Pekar, writing for DownBeat, gave a mixed evaluation of the album, noting on two of the tracks that during pauses between phrases, "it's almost as if he's trying to catch his breath before playing the next lick. His sense of time is also none too sharp." However, he praised "If I Loved You" and "Someone to Watch Over Me," noting, "he seems to be on another planet, demonstrating a harmonic sense as advanced in its way as that of any 'new thing' musician, and conveying a feeling of great poignancy."

== Track listing ==
1. "I Know That You Know" (Anne Caldwell, Vincent Youmans) – 5:59
2. "Someone to Watch Over Me" (George Gershwin, Ira Gershwin) – 3:52
3. "The Best Thing for You" (Irving Berlin) – 4:56
4. "On Green Dolphin Street" (Bronislaw Kaper, Ned Washington) – 5:46
5. "Just One of Those Things" (Cole Porter) – 5:44
6. "I Remember Clifford" (Benny Golson) – 4:29
7. "Hallucinations" (Powell) – 4:54
8. "If I Loved You" (Lorenz Hart, Richard Rodgers) – 4:36
9. "I Hear Music" (Burton Lane, Frank Loesser) – 5:38
10. "Autumn in New York" (Vernon Duke) – 4:03

Note the tracks "I Hear Music" and "Autumn in New York" only appear on Japanese CD reissues from 2001 onward.

== Personnel ==
- Bud Powell – piano
- John Ore – bass
- J. C. Moses – drums
