= Inner Fires =

Live album by Bud Powell
- Released: 1982
- Recorded: April 5, 1953
- Venue: Club Kavakos, Washington D.C.
- Genre: Bebop
- Length: 46:06
- Label: Elektra

Bud Powell chronology
A Tribute to Cannonball (1979)	Inner Fires (1982)	The Essen Jazz Festival Concert (1988)

Professional ratings
Review scores
Source	Rating
Allmusic	4/5 stars
The Rolling Stone Jazz Record Guide	5/5 stars
The Penguin Guide to Jazz	4/4 stars

Inner Fires is a live album by jazz pianist Bud Powell recorded at Club Kavakos in 1953. Also appearing on the record were bassist Charles Mingus and drummer Roy Haynes. Some releases of the album include recordings of interviews with Powell from 1963, during his stay at the Bouffémount Sanatorium in France.

== Reception ==
Jazz critic Scott Yanow praised the album, noting Powell's "consistently exciting form" and the "inspired and creative" musicianship throughout the album. John Swenson of The Rolling Stone Jazz Record Guide gave it five stars, describing the music as "tumultuous".

The Penguin Guide to Jazz described the album as "compelling" and noted that Powell "plays out of his skin for most of the hour."

== Track listing ==
1. "I Want to Be Happy" (Irving Caesar, Vincent Youmans) – 3:41
2. "Somebody Loves Me" (Buddy DeSylva, George Gershwin, Ballard MacDonald) – 3:47
3. "Nice Work if You Can Get It" (Gershwin, Ira Gershwin) – 3:18
4. "Salt Peanuts" (Kenny Clarke, Dizzy Gillespie) – 9:06
5. "Conception" (George Shearing) – 3:20
6. "Lullaby of Birdland" (Shearing, George David Weiss) – 1:49
7. "Little Willie Leaps" (Miles Davis) – 7:06
8. "Hallelujah!" (Clifford Grey, Leo Robin, Youmans) – 4:22
9. "Lullaby of Birdland" (Shearing) – 2:44
10. "Sure Thing" (Gershwin, Jerome Kern) – 1:53
11. "Woody 'n' You" (Gillespie) – 7:57
12. Interviews – 4:50

== Personnel ==
- Bud Powell – piano
- Charles Mingus – bass
- Roy Haynes – drums
