= Something Old, Something New (album) =

Studio album by Dizzy Gillespie
- Released: 1963
- Recorded: April 23–25, 1963, A&R Studios, New York City (New York)
- Genre: Jazz
- Length: 40:50; 44:12 (CD reissue)
- Label: Philips
- Producer: Hal Mooney

Dizzy Gillespie chronology
The New Continent (1962)	Something Old, Something New (1963)	Dizzy Gillespie and the Double Six of Paris (1963)

Something Old, Something New is a studio album by Dizzy Gillespie, recorded and released in 1963.

== Reception ==
The AllMusic review states "this was one of Dizzy Gillespie's finest sessions of the 1960s".

Professional ratings
Review scores
Source	Rating
AllMusic	4.5/5 stars
Down Beat; Original Lp Issue	4/5 stars
New Record Mirror	4/5 stars
The Rolling Stone Jazz Record Guide	4/5 stars
The Penguin Guide to Jazz Recordings	3/4 stars

== Track listing ==
1. "Bebop" (Dizzy Gillespie) – 6:17
2. "Good Bait" (Count Basie, Tadd Dameron) – 3:03
3. Medley: "I Can't Get Started"/"'Round Midnight" (Vernon Duke, Ira Gershwin)/(Thelonious Monk, Bernie Hanighen, Cootie Williams) – 6:23
4. "Dizzy Atmosphere" (Gillespie) – 6:12
5. "November Afternoon" (Tom McIntosh) – 4:19
6. "This Lovely Feeling" (Margo Guryan, Arif Mardin) – 4:19
7. "The Day After" (McIntosh) – 4:33
8. "Cup Bearers" (McIntosh) – 6:11
9. "Early Mornin' Blues" (Gillespie) – 2:55 Bonus track on CD reissue

== Personnel ==
- Dizzy Gillespie – trumpet
- James Moody – flute, alto saxophone, tenor saxophone
- Kenny Barron – piano
- Chris White – double bass
- Rudy Collins – drums
