= Award at Birdland, 64 =

- Earl Bud Powell, Vol. 10

Live album by Bud Powell
- Released: 1989
- Recorded: October 1, 1964
- Venue: Birdland, NYC
- Genre: Bebop
- Length: 61:53
- Label: Mythic Sound

Bud Powell chronology
Return to Birdland, 64 (1989)	Award at Birdland, 64 (1989)	'Round About Midnight at the Blue Note (1994)

Award at Birdland, 64, also known as Earl Bud Powell, Vol. 10, is a live album by jazz pianist Bud Powell, recorded at Birdland on October 1, 1964, with bassist John Ore and drummer J. C. Moses. It was released by the Mythic Sound label in 1989.

== Critical reception ==
Scott Yanow noted that "the recording quality is quite erratic" and described it as "not the strongest Bud Powell set available," but also commented that "this interesting release hints at what might have been and shows that Powell could still play well this late in his troubled life."

The Penguin Guide to Jazz gave a higher rating and described Powell's performances at Birdland as "the last great sessions of his life."

Professional ratings
Review scores
Source	Rating
Allmusic	2.5/5 stars
The Penguin Guide to Jazz	3.5/4 stars

== Track listing ==
1. Presentation of Shaeffer Award
2. "The Best Thing for You" (Irving Berlin)
3. "Like Someone in Love" (Jimmy Van Heusen, Johnny Burke)
4. "Off Minor" (Thelonious Monk)
5. "Star Eyes" (Gene de Paul, Don Raye)
6. "Back Home Again in Indiana" (James F. Hanley, Ballard MacDonald)
7. "I Should Care" (Axel Stordahl, Paul Weston)
8. "Nice Work If You Can Get It" (George Gershwin, Ira Gershwin)
9. "Monopoly" (Powell)
10. "All God's Chillun Got Rhythm" (Walter Jurmann, Gus Kahn, Bronisław Kaper)
11. "Lullaby of Birdland" (George Shearing)

== Personnel ==
- Bud Powell – piano
- John Ore – bass
- J. C. Moses – drums
