= Dizzy Gillespie and the Double Six of Paris =

Studio album by Dizzy Gillespie, Les Double Six, and Bud Powell
- Released: February 15, 1964
- Recorded: July 8, 1963; Europasonor Studios, Paris, France September 20, 1963; Chicago
- Genre: Jazz
- Length: 38:45
- Label: Philips

Dizzy Gillespie chronology
Something Old, Something New (1963)	Dizzy Gillespie and the Double Six of Paris (1964)	Dizzy Goes Hollywood (1963)

Bud Powell chronology
Bud Powell in Paris (1964)	Dizzy Gillespie and the Double Six of Paris (1964)	The Invisible Cage (1964)

Professional ratings
Review scores
Source	Rating
Allmusic	3/5 stars
DownBeat	5/5 stars
The Penguin Guide to Jazz	3.5/4 stars
The Rolling Stone Jazz Record Guide	4/5 stars

Dizzy Gillespie and the Double Six of Paris is a 1963 studio album collaboration between Dizzy Gillespie and Les Double Six, also known as the Double Six of Paris, a French vocal group who sings in vocalese to songs associated with Dizzy Gillespie. Gillespie, pianist Bud Powell, and a rhythm section accompany; two of the songs feature his quintet, with James Moody. It was reissued on CD in 1989.

The vocal parts by the Double Six were overdubbed on top of recordings by Gillespie, Powell, Pierre Michelot, and Kenny Clarke that had been made in July 1963. Two tracks were recorded with James Moody, Kenny Barron, Chris White, and Rudy Collins in Chicago in September 1963.

== Reception ==
Leonard Feather described the album as "unique and unprecedented" and described the music as "sensational." Commenting on the vocalists, he wrote, "The results impress partly as a technical tour de force, and the Double Six must be respected for its accuracy and peerless intonation, but these values are a means to an artistically complete end."

The Penguin Guide to Jazz gave the album 3.5 of 4 stars, applauding Gillespie's "superb solos" and the Double Six's "supremely athletic vocals."

== Track listing ==
1. "Emanon" (Gillespie, Shaw) – 3:44
2. "Anthropology" (Gillespie, Parker) – 2:45
3. "Tin Tin Deo" (Fuller, Pozo) – 4:15
4. "One Bass Hit" (Brown, Fuller, Gillespie) – 3:26
5. "Two Bass Hit" (Gillespie, Lewis) – 3:31
6. "Groovin' High" (Gillespie, Paparelli) – 2:27
7. "Ooh-Shoo-Be-Doo-Bee" (Carroll, Gillespie, Graham) – 3:04
8. "Hot House" (Dameron) – 3:01
9. "Con Alma" (Gillespie) – 3:35
10. "Blue 'n' Boogie" (Gillespie, Paparelli) – 3:08
11. "The Champ" (Gillespie) – 3:06
12. "Ow!" (Gillespie) – 2:43

== Personnel ==
=== Vocalists ===
- Jean-Claude Briodin – vocals
- Christiane Legrand – vocals
- Eddy Louiss – vocals
- Mimi Perrin – vocals
- Bob Smart – vocals
- Ward Swingle – vocals

=== Instrumentalists ===
- Dizzy Gillespie – trumpet, vocal (7)
- James Moody – alto saxophone (7, 9)
- Kenny Barron – piano (7, 9)
- Bud Powell – piano (1–3, 6, 8, 10–12)
- Pierre Michelot – bass (1–3, 6, 8, 10–12)
- Chris White – bass (7, 9)
- Kenny Clarke – drums (1–3, 6, 8, 10–12)
- Rudy Collins – drums (7, 9)

=== Arrangers ===
- Lalo Schifrin – arranger
