= The Essen Jazz Festival Concert =

Live album by Bud Powell and Coleman Hawkins
- Released: 1988
- Recorded: April 2, 1960
- Venue: Essen, Germany
- Genre: Jazz
- Length: 51:14
- Label: Black Lion
- Producer: Alan Bates

Bud Powell chronology
| Inner Fires (1982) | The Essen Jazz Festival Concert (1988) | Early Years of a Genius, 44–48 (1989) |

Professional ratings
Review scores
| Source | Rating |
|---|---|
| AllMusic | 4.5/5 stars |

The Essen Jazz Festival Concert is a live album by jazz pianist Bud Powell and saxophone player Coleman Hawkins compiled from a live concert by the two artists, joined by Oscar Pettiford on bass and Kenny Clarke on drums.

== Reception ==
The album was well received by critics, with Joseph Neff writing, "a safe bet that modern jazz fans will welcome this addition to their shelves" and giving the album an A−. Jazz critic Scott Yanow described Powell's performance as "top form" and described his trio as "all-star."

== Track listing ==
1. "Shaw 'Nuff" (Ray Brown, Dizzy Gillespie, Charlie Parker) – 4:46
2. "Blues in the Closet" (Harry Babasin, Oscar Pettiford) – 5:53
3. "Willow Weep for Me" (Ann Ronnell) – 4:27
4. "John's Abbey" (Powell) – 3:49
5. "Salt Peanuts" (Kenny Clarke, Gillespie) – 5:00
6. "All the Things You Are" (Jerome Kern, Oscar Hammerstein II) – 6:51
7. "Just You, Just Me" (Jesse Greer, Raymond Klages) – 6:16
8. "Yesterdays" (Kern, Otto Harbach) – 6:37
9. "Stuffy" (Hawkins) – 7:35

== Personnel ==
=== Performance ===
- Coleman Hawkins – tenor saxophone (6–9)
- Bud Powell – piano
- Oscar Pettiford – bass
- Kenny Clarke – drums

=== Production ===
- Erik Wiedemann – liner notes
- Alan Bates – producer
- Rick Simenson – design
- Chuck Stewart – photography, cover photo
