= The Great Blue Star Sessions 1952–1953 =

Compilation album by Dizzy Gillespie
- Released: 2004
- Recorded: March 25 and April 5 and 6, 1952, at the Théâtre des Champs-Élysées and February 22, 1953, at the Studio Pathe Magellan in Paris, France
- Genre: Jazz
- Length: 123:01
- Label: EmArcy; 980 986-3

Dizzy Gillespie chronology
Dee Gee Days: The Savoy Sessions (1951–52)	The Great Blue Star Sessions 1952–1953 (2004)	Dizzy Digs Paris (1953)

The Great Blue Star Sessions 1952–1953 is a compilation album by trumpeter Dizzy Gillespie featuring performances recorded in 1952 and 1953 and originally released on the French Blue Star label. Many of the tracks were first released as 78 rpm records and re-released in the US as albums on the Atlantic and Fontana labels such as Dizzy at Home and Abroad and Dizzy Gillespie and His Operatic Strings Orchestra.

== Reception ==
The Allmusic review stated "it's not for the casual fan, but anyone who knows of these recordings on any level understands what a key place they hold on Dizzy's shelf as he transitioned from the bebop of the 1940s into the hard bopping, big-group wailing of the 1950s. Highly recommended".

== Track listing ==
All compositions by Dizzy Gillespie except as indicated

Disc One:

1. "Cocktails for Two" (Sam Coslow, Arthur Johnston) – 2:44
2. "Cognac Blues" – 2:42
3. "Moon Nocturne" (Nathaniel Shilkret) – 3:05
4. "Sabla y Blu" – 3:07
5. "Blue and Sentimental" (Count Basie, Mack David, Jerry Livingston) – 2:44
6. "Just One More Chance" (Coslow, Johnston) – 3:14
7. "The Man I Love" (George Gershwin, Ira Gershwin) – 3:14
8. "Night and Day" (Cole Porter) – 3:04
9. "Night and Day" alternate take (Porter) – 3:06
10. "Sweet and Lovely" (Gus Arnheim, Harry Tobias, Jules LeMare) – 3:27
11. "Sweet and Lovely" [alternate take 1] (Arnheim, Lemare, Tobias) – 3:51
12. "Sweet and Lovely" [alternate take 2] (Arnheim, Lemare, Tobias) – 3:28
13. "My Old Flame" (Coslow, Johnston) – 3:22
14. "My Old Flame" [alternate take] (Coslow, Johnston) – 3:41
15. "I Waited for You" (Gil Fuller, Gillespie) – 3:18
16. "Ghost of a Chance" (Bing Crosby, Ned Washington, Victor Young) – 3:05
17. "They Can't Take That Away from Me" (Gershwin, Gershwin) – 3:16
18. ""They Can't Take That Away from Me" [alternate take] (Gershwin, Gershwin) – 4:01
19. "Taking a Chance on Love" (Vernon Duke, Ted Fetter, John Latouche) – 2:44
20. "Taking a Chance on Love" [alternate take 1] (Duke, Fetter, Latouche) – 3:29
21. "Taking a Chance on Love" [alternate take 2] (Duke, Fetter, Latouche) – 3:36

Disc Two:

1. "When It's Sleepy Time Down South" (Clarence Muse, Leon René, Otis René) – 2:57
2. "Lullaby in Rhythm" (Benny Goodman, Clarence Profit, Edgar Sampson) – 4:24
3. "Lullaby in Rhythm" [alternate take] (Goodman, Profit, Sampson) – 4:07
4. "Just Blues (One More Blues)" – 3:01
5. "Ain't Misbehavin'" (Harry Brooks, Andy Razaf, Fats Waller) – 2:58
6. "Summertime" (George Gershwin, DuBose Heyward) – 4:18
7. "Blue Moon" (Lorenz Hart, Richard Rodgers) – 4:27
8. "Mama's Blues (Mrs. Dizzy's Blues)" – 4:04
9. "Undecided" (Sid Robin, Charlie Shavers) – 2:34
10. "The Way You Look Tonight" (Dorothy Fields, Jerome Kern) – 4:16
11. "Stormy Weather" (Harold Arlen, Ted Koehler) – 3:51
12. "Jalousie" (Vera Bloom, Jacob Gade) – 2:36
13. "The Very Thought of You" (Ray Noble) – 2:37
14. "Fine and Dandy" (Paul James, Kay Swift) – 3:44
15. "I've Got You Under My Skin" (Porter) – 2:24
16. "Pennies from Heaven" (Johnny Burke, Arthur Johnston) – 2:25

Recorded on March 25 (Disc One, tracks 1–6), April 5 (Disc One, tracks 7–21) and April 6 (Disc Two, tracks 1–8), 1952 at the Théâtre des Champs-Élysées and on February 22 (Disc Two, tracks 9–16), 1953 at the Studio Pathe Magellan in Paris, France

== Personnel ==
- Dizzy Gillespie – trumpet, vocals
- René Bigerille – flute (Disc One, tracks 7–16)
- André Gosset, Guy Destanges, René Vasseur – trombone (Disc One, tracks 7–16)
- Albert Gillot – clarinet (Disc One, tracks 7–16)
- Don Byas – tenor saxophone (Disc One, tracks 1–6, Disc Two, tracks 19, 21, 22 & 25)
- Jean-Jacques Tilché – guitar (Disc One, tracks: 7–21)
- Wade Legge (Disc Two, tracks 9–16), Arnold Ross (Disc One, tracks 7–21, Disc Two, tracks 1–8), Art Simmons (Disc One, tracks 1–6) – piano
- Joe Benjamin (Disc One and Disc Two, tracks 1–8), Lou Hackney (Disc Two tracks 9–16) – bass
- Bill Clark (Disc One and Disc Two, tracks 1–8), Al Jones (Disc Two tracks 9–16) – drums
- Humberto Morales – congas (Disc One, tracks 1–6)
- Robert Jeannoutot – oboe (Disc One, tracks 7–16)
- Jean Louchez – bassoon (Disc One, tracks 7–16)
- Yvan Allouche, Maurice Elhan, Lionel Gali, Leon Locatelli, Octave Marchesini, Georges Mignot, Albert Mousseux, Roger Sanard, Jean Sauvage – violin (Disc One, tracks 7–16)
- Gabriel Beauvais, Andre Saulnier – viola (Disc One, tracks 7–16)
- Pierre Coddee, Georges Schwartz – cello (Disc One, tracks 7–16)
- Bernard Galais – harp (Disc One, tracks 7–16)
- Jo Boyer, Daniel White – arranger (Disc One, tracks 7–16)
- The Paris Operatic String Orchestra arranged by Michel Legrand (Disc Two, tracks 11–16)
