= Blues in the Closet (Bud Powell album) =

Studio album by Bud Powell
- Released: 1958
- Recorded: September 23, 1956
- Genre: Jazz
- Length: 38:15
- Label: Verve
- Producer: Norman Granz

Bud Powell chronology
| Bud! (1957) | Blues in the Closet (1958) | Swingin' with Bud (1958) |

Professional ratings
Review scores
| Source | Rating |
|---|---|
| AllMusic | 3/5 stars |

Blues in the Closet is a studio album by the jazz pianist Bud Powell. Released in 1958 by Verve, it contains a session that Powell recorded at Fine Sound Studios in New York in September 1956.

The album was released as a CD replica by Verve (Japan) in 2006 (POCJ-2744). The sessions (with alternate takes) are also available on The Complete Bud Powell on Verve (1994) CD box set.

== History ==
This session is the last that Powell recorded for Verve, and re-unites him with Ray Brown for the first time (in the studio at least) since the first Verve sessions back in 1949-50. Fittingly, it ends with "52nd Street Theme", the traditional closing number in the heyday of bebop in the nineteen-forties.

== Track listing 12" LP (MGV 8218) ==
1. "When I Fall in Love" (Victor Young, Edward Heyman) – 1:42
2. "My Heart Stood Still" (Richard Rodgers, Lorenz Hart) – 3:33
3. "Blues in the Closet" (aka "Collard Greens and Black Eyed Peas") (Harry Babasin, Oscar Pettiford) – 3:04
4. "Swingin' Till the Girls Come Home" (Pettiford) – 3:24
5. "I Know That You Know" (Vincent Youmans, Anne Caldwell) – 2:26
6. "Elegy" (aka "Elogie") – 3:00
7. "Woody 'n You" (Dizzy Gillespie) – 3:55
8. "I Should Care" (Sammy Cahn, Axel Stordahl, Paul Weston) – 3:42
9. "Now's the Time" (Charlie Parker) – 4:36
10. "I Didn't Know What Time It Was" (Rodgers, Hart) – 4:02
11. "Be-Bop" (Gillespie) – 2:27
12. "52nd Street Theme" (Thelonious Monk) – 2:24

== Personnel ==
=== Performance ===
September 23, 1956. Fine Sound Studios, New York.

- Bud Powell – piano
- Ray Brown – double bass
- Osie Johnson – drums

=== Production ===
- Norman Granz – producer
