= Joe Carroll (singer) =

American jazz musician

Joe "Bebop" Carroll (November 25, 1919 – February 1, 1981) was an American jazz vocalist who worked with Dizzy Gillespie between 1949 and 1953. His collaborations with Gillespie include the humorous songs "Swing Low, Sweet Cadillac" and "Oo Bla Dee."

== Career ==
A native of Philadelphia, Pennsylvania, United States, he was born Joseph Paul Taylor. In 1949, he became a member of the Dizzy Gillespie big band. The band broke up a year later, but Carroll continued in a small group formed by Gillespie. In 1953, he left Gillespie and pursued a solo career, recording albums for Epic in the 1950s.

== Discography ==
=== As leader ===
- Joe Carroll with the Ray Bryant Quintet (Epic, 1956)
- School Days with Dizzy Gillespie, Milt Jackson (Regent, 1957)
- Man with a Happy Sound (Charlie Parker, 1962)
- The Bebop Singers (Prestige, 1970)
- Jumpin' at Jazzmania (Jazzmania, 1978)
- The Epic and Prestige Sessions and More (Fresh Sound, 2017)

=== As sideman ===
With Dizzy Gillespie

- Pleyel Concert 1953 (Vogue, 1953)
- Carnegie Hall Concert (Verve, 1961)
- Dee Gee Days: The Savoy Sessions (Savoy, 1976)
- The Complete RCA Victor Recordings (Bluebird, 1995)
- Dizzy Digs Paris (Giant Steps, 2006)
