= Jambo Caribe =

Studio album by Dizzy Gillespie
- Released: 1964
- Recorded: November 4, 5 & 6, 1964; Universal Studios, Chicago
- Genre: Jazz
- Length: 32:57
- Label: Limelight; LS 86007
- Producer: Hal Mooney

Dizzy Gillespie chronology
The Cool World (1964)	Jambo Caribe (1964)	Gil Fuller & the Monterey Jazz Festival Orchestra featuring Dizzy Gillespie (1965)

Jambo Caribe is an album by trumpeter Dizzy Gillespie recorded in 1964 and released on the Limelight label.

== Reception ==
The Allmusic review states "The populist Dizzy Gillespie gets full rein in this lively, happy collection of tunes exploring rhythms and idioms from the Caribbean. Gillespie is in an ebullient mood, even offering some sly lead calypso vocals on three numbers".

Professional ratings
Review scores
Source	Rating
Allmusic	3/5 stars
The Rolling Stone Jazz Record Guide	3/5 stars
The Penguin Guide to Jazz Recordings	3/4 stars

== Track listing ==
All compositions by Dizzy Gillespie except as indicated

1. "Fiesta Mo-Jo" – 3:50
2. "Barbados Carnival" (Chris White) – 2:55
3. "Jambo" – 4:57
4. "Trinidad, Hello" (Kenny Barron) – 4:20
5. "Poor Joe" (Joe Willoughby) – 2:38
6. "And Then She Stopped" – 3:15
7. "Don't Try to Keep up with the Joneses" (Willoughby) – 2:36
8. "Trinidad, Goodbye" (Barron) – 8:26
- Recorded at Universal Studios in Chicago, Illinois on November 4 (tracks 2 & 6), November 5 (tracks 3–5) and November 6 (tracks 1, 7 & 8), 1964

== Personnel ==
- Dizzy Gillespie – trumpet, vocals
- James Moody – tenor saxophone, flute
- Kenny Barron – piano
- Chris White – bass, vocals
- Rudy Collins – drums
- Kansas Fields – percussion
