= The Cool World (soundtrack) =

Soundtrack album by Dizzy Gillespie
- Released: 1964
- Recorded: April 23–24, 1964
- Genre: Jazz; hard bop; post-bop
- Label: Philips (Verve reissue)
- Producer: Hal Mooney

Dizzy Gillespie chronology
Dizzy Goes Hollywood (1963)	The Cool World (1964)	Jambo Caribe (1964)

The Cool World is a 1964 soundtrack album to the film The Cool World by Dizzy Gillespie and his quintet, composed and arranged by Mal Waldron, a jazz pianist and composer.

== Reception ==
Professional ratings
Review scores
Source	Rating
Allmusic	4/5 stars

The Allmusic review by Thom Jurek awarded the album four stars and said that "This set is one of Diz's best records of the 1960s (which is saying something), and one of the best jazz film scores period...Waldron's sense of economy in picking both impressionistic and expressionist avenues for blues to speak through jazz in an inspired quintet like this is remarkable -- the temptation would be to excess at every turn, especially given Waldron's gift for sophisticated harmonies and spacy lyrical concerns...Ultimately, the soundtrack to Cool World is an enormous success artistically, standing head and shoulders over virtually every other such effort of the period, and a welcome addition to the Gillespie catalog, offering a very keen and muscular view of his 1964 band". An AllAboutJazz reviewer commented that the score, "alternately dark and moody and exhilaratingly brisk, is full of short, resonant tracks [...] one of the great jazz film scores."

== Track listing ==
1. "Theme from The Cool World" – 5:17
2. "The Pushers" – 2:34
3. "Enter, Priest" – 4:11
4. "Duke's Awakening" – 2:43
5. "Duke on the Run" – 5:16
6. "Street Music" – 2:34
7. "Bonnie's Blues" – 4:00
8. "Coney Island" – 3:43
9. "Duke's Fantasy" – 2:16
10. "Coolie" – 3:39
11. "Duke's Last Soliloquy" – 3:04

All music composed by Mal Waldron.

== Personnel ==
=== Performance ===
- Dizzy Gillespie – trumpet
- James Moody – flute, tenor saxophone
- Kenny Barron – piano
- Chris White – double bass
- Rudy Collins – drums
- Mal Waldron – composer, arranger
- Nat Hentoff – liner notes
