= Mythic Sound =

- Founded: 1989; 36 years ago
- Founder: Francis Paudras; Cecelia Powell
- Genre: Bebop
- Country of origin: United States

Mythic Sound is an American record label that released a series of recordings of Bud Powell titled Earl Bud Powell, grouped in eleven albums. The albums were released in 1989.

== History ==
The recordings for the record label were made privately by French jazz aficionado Francis Paudras and willed to Bud Powell's daughter Cecilia Powell in 1979. Among the albums released by the record label were Early Years of a Genius, 44–48, Relaxin' at Home, Holidays in Edenville, Return to Birdland, and Award at Birdland. According to jazz critic Scott Yanow, "All of the releases will be wanted by the artist's greatest fans, but some are better than others. Vol. 1 is the most historic, for ten selections feature the innovative pianist at age 20 in 1944 as a sideman with trumpeter Cootie Williams's Orchestra."

Among the sidemen on the albums were Johnny Griffin, J. J. Johnson, Lee Konitz, Art Blakey, Dizzy Gillespie, and Kenny Clarke.

== Discography ==
- 1944–48: Earl Bud Powell, Vol. 1: Early Years of a Genius, 44–48 (Mythic Sound)
- 1953–55: Earl Bud Powell, Vol. 2: Burnin' in U.S.A., 53–55 (Mythic Sound)
- 1957–59: Earl Bud Powell, Vol. 3: Cookin' at Saint-Germain, 57–59 (Mythic Sound)
- 1961–64: Earl Bud Powell, Vol. 4: Relaxin' at Home, 61-64 (Mythic Sound)
- 1959–61: Earl Bud Powell, Vol. 5: Groovin' at the Blue Note, 59–61 (Mythic Sound)
- 1963: Earl Bud Powell, Vol. 6: Writin' for Duke, 63 (Mythic Sound)
- 1964: Earl Bud Powell, Vol. 7: Tribute to Thelonious, 64 (Mythic Sound)
- 1964: Earl Bud Powell, Vol. 8: Holidays in Edenville, 64 (Mythic Sound)
- 1964: Earl Bud Powell, Vol. 9: Return to Birdland, 64 (Mythic Sound)
- 1964: Earl Bud Powell, Vol. 10: Award at Birdland, 64 (Mythic Sound)
- 1960–64: Earl Bud Powell, Vol. 11: Gift for the Friends, 60–64 (Mythic Sound)
