= Dizzy Goes Hollywood =

Studio album by Dizzy Gillespie
- Released: 1964
- Recorded: September 11–14, 1963
- Genre: Jazz
- Length: 51:59
- Label: Philips (Verve reissue)
- Producer: Hal Mooney

Dizzy Gillespie chronology
Dizzy Gillespie and the Double Six of Paris (1963)	Dizzy Goes Hollywood (1964)	The Cool World (1964)

Dizzy Goes Hollywood is a 1964 studio album by Dizzy Gillespie and his quintet, featuring the saxophonist James Moody.

== Reception ==
Professional ratings
Review scores
Source	Rating
AllMusic	3/5 stars

The AllMusic review by Scott Yanow awarded the album three stars and said that "On first glance this LP looks like a dud...However, because the trumpeter was near the peak of his powers and his band does play such songs as "Moon River," "Days of Wine and Roses," and "Carioca" with spirit, the results are quite worthwhile, if not essential". The Los Angeles Times described the contents as "a strikingly atypical program of tunes from movies".

== Track listing ==
1. "Main Theme from Exodus" (Ernest Gold) – 2:46
2. "Moon River" (from Breakfast at Tiffany's) (Henry Mancini, Johnny Mercer) – 2:54
3. "Caesar and Cleopatra Theme" (from Cleopatra) (Alex North) – 3:13
4. "Days of Wine and Roses" (from Days of Wine and Roses) (Mancini, Mercer) – 2:20
5. "Walk on the Wild Side" (from Walk on the Wild Side) (Mack David, Elmer Bernstein) – 7:19
6. "More" (from Mondo cane) (Nino Oliviero, Riz Ortolani) – 2:47
7. "Love Theme from Lolita" (Bob Harris) – 2:50
8. "Picnic Theme" (from Picnic) (George Duning) – 2:26
9. "Never on Sunday" (from Never on Sunday) (Manos Hatzidakis) – 3:09
10. "Theme from Lawrence of Arabia" (Maurice Jarre) – 3:10
11. ""Carioca" (from Flying Down to Rio) (Edward Eliscu, Gus Kahn, Vincent Youmans) – 3:02

== Personnel ==
- Dizzy Gillespie – trumpet
- James Moody - saxophone
- Kenny Barron – piano
- Billy Byers – arranger
