= Kansas Fields =

American jazz musician

Carl Donnell "Kansas" Fields (December 5, 1915, Chapman, Kansas – March 7, 1995, Chicago, Illinois) was an American jazz drummer.

Fields played in Chicago from the late 1920s, and worked with King Kolax and Jimmie Noone in the 1930s. In 1940, he joined Roy Eldridge's group for a year; he returned to play with Eldridge again later in the 1940s. He briefly led his own ensemble and played with Ella Fitzgerald and Benny Carter before joining the Marines during World War II. After the war, he played with Cab Calloway, Claude Hopkins, Sidney Bechet, Dizzy Gillespie (recording with Gillespie in 1951), and Eldridge again before the close of the decade.

He led another group of his own early in the 1950s, then played with Mezz Mezzrow in Europe in 1953. Fields stayed in Europe for more than a decade; he relocated to France and worked as a sideman. In 1965, he returned to Chicago, working once more with Gillespie and doing studio work.

== Discography ==
With Dizzy Gillespie

- Dee Gee Days: The Savoy Sessions (Savoy, 1951-52 [1976])
- Jambo Caribe (Limelight, 1964)

With various artists

- Mel Powell, Swingin' Clarinets (London, Commodore Series, 1942)
- Eddie Condon, The Town Call Concert (JZCL, 1944)
- Jonah Jones, Swing De Paris (Fremeaux & Associes, 1946)
- Jonah Jones, The Engine Room - A History Of Jazz Drumming From Storyville to 52nd Street (Proper, 1946)
- Cab Calloway, Hep Cats And Cool Jive (Fuel, 1946)
- Soul Sister Vol. 3 Sister Rosetta Tharpe (MCA, 1949)
- Lionel Hampton w/Milton Mezzaow Vol. 2 (Blue Star, 1950's)
- Teddy Wilson, Piano Moods (Philips, 1950)
- Budd Johnson, The Chronogical (Classics, 1951)
- Joe Williams, Sings (Savoy Jazz, 1951)
- Buck Clayton Quintet/Gene Sedric and his Group (Vogue, 1953)
- Buck Clayton and Wild Bill Davidson, Singing Trumpets (Jazztone, 1953)
- Mary-Lou Williams, et ses formations (Club Francais du Disque, 1954)
- Albert Nicholas, New Orleans Parade Vol. 1 & Vol. 2 (Vogue, 1955)
- Mezz Mezzrow, Recorded In Paris (Disques Swing, 1955)
- William "Big Bill" Broonzy (Columbia, 1956)
- Sidney Bechet, Recorded in Concert at Brussels Fair (Columbia, 1958)
- Sidney Bechet & Teddy Buckner, "Bravo!" (Vogue, 1958)
- Sarah Vaughan w/Quincy Jones, Misty (Mercury, 1958)
- Coleman Hawkins, Disorder At The Border (Milian, 1962)
- Americans in Europe Vol. 2 (Impulse!, 1963)
- Errol Parker (Brunswick, 1963)
- Memphis Slim, The Memphis Slim Story (Vogue, 1963)
- Bud Powell In Paris (Discovery, 1963)
- Floyd McDaniel, Let Your Hair Down! (Delmark, 1994)
- Little Brother Montgomery and the Jazz All Stars (FM Records, 2001)
