= Francis Paudras =

- Paudras in 1989

Background information
- Born: January 21, 1935; Chilly-Mazarin, Ile-de-France, France
- Died: November 26, 1997 (aged 62) Antigny, Vienne, France
- Occupations: Musician; author
- Instruments: Piano; brushes

Francis Paudras (January 21, 1935 – November 26, 1997) was a French musician and author best known for La Danse des Infidels, his memoir of jazz pianist Bud Powell.

== Biography ==
Paudras was born in Chilly-Mazarin, France on January 21, 1935.

He was "a keen follower of jazz in Paris" who befriended a number of jazz pianists including Powell, Bill Evans, and Jacky Terrasson. He was Powell's carer and manager from 1963 to 1964, when he brought the bebop pianist back to New York after his stay in France. DownBeat noted that Paudras was "largely responsible for Powell’s recovery [from tuberculosis]. Paudras took the pianist in hand, nursed him back to health, and protected him from the various social vultures that were always nearby."

Paudras captured hours of footage of Powell, in addition to interviews and recordings of other prominent jazz musicians of the era, which he added to his collection; the videos ultimately became part of Rutgers University's Library. Among the musicians interviewed in the collection were Kenny Clarke, Max Roach, Pierre Michelot, and Dizzy Gillespie. The Council on Library and Information Resources financed a digitalization of the collection in 2021; in 2022 Diane Biunno of the Journal of Jazz Studies announced that it would be posted on Rutgers' online database by spring 2023.

Paudras was among the personnel of the album Relaxin' at Home, recorded on makeshift brushes at his home along with pianist Powell and bassist Michel Gaudry. The album included one of the first appearances of Powell's composition dedicated to Paudras, "Una Noche con Francis."

Paudras wrote two books: La Danse des Infidels about the life of Powell, and a book to which he was the co-author, To Bird with Love. The former included a detailed account of Powell's later life and described the friendship between Powell and Paudras from a more personal perspective than that of a typical biography. La Danse des Infidels was used as source material for Bertrand Tavernier's 1986 film Round Midnight starring saxophone player Dexter Gordon, who had himself recorded with Powell while the pianist was living in France.

His home, a castle previously occupied by the Knights Templar, in rural France was a popular destination for jazz expatriates living in Europe including Johnny Griffin, Thelonious Monk, and Bill Evans. Paudras was himself an accomplished jazz and classical pianist, and a few of his performances during the 1980s were captured on tape.

Paudras gave his record collection, which included studio, live and home recordings of Bud Powell, to the deceased pianist's daughter Celia in 1979. These recordings were released under the Mythic Sound label in 1989 in a ten-CD collection under the title Earl Bud Powell; among the albums included in the collection were Early Years of a Genius, Relaxin’ at Home, Holidays in Edenville, Return to Birdland, and Award at Birdland.

Paudras died by suicide on November 26, 1997, at his home in France following attempts by the French government to confiscate his collection due to a tax dispute.
