= School Days (Will D. Cobb and Gus Edwards song) =

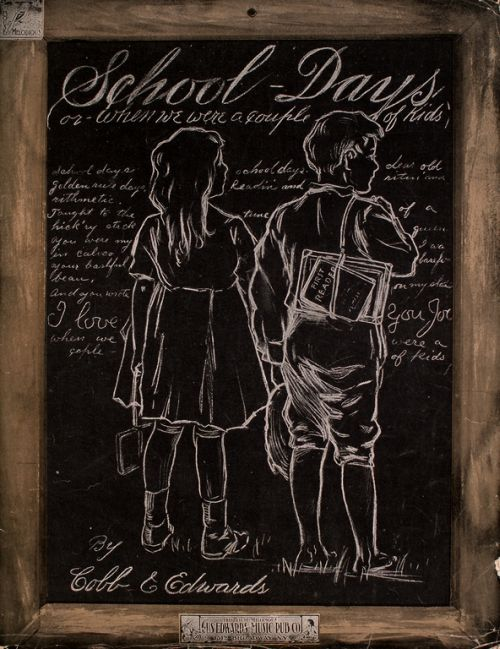
- Sheet music cover

Song
- Published: 1907
- Songwriters: Gus Edwards, Will D. Cobb

Audio sample
- Recording of School Days, performed by Albert Campbell (1908): file; help

"School Days" is an American popular song written in 1907 by Will D. Cobb and Gus Edwards. Its subject is of a mature couple looking back sentimentally on their childhood together in primary school. The song was featured in a Broadway show of the same name, the first in a series of Edwards' school acts. It was the inspiration for many subsequent school acts, including the Marx Brothers' Fun in Hi Skule, their first major Vaudeville success.

The best known part of the song is its chorus:

School days, school days
Dear old Golden Rule days
'Reading and 'riting and 'rithmetic
Taught to the tune of the hick'ry stick
You were my queen in calico
I was your bashful, barefoot beau
And you wrote on my slate, "I Love You, Joe"
When we were a couple o' kids

== Recordings ==
"School Days" has been recorded many times over the years. Byron G. Harlan was an early recording star who made it a hit. Billy Murray and Ada Jones also sang it as memorable duet, referenced decades later by Tiny Tim on one of his albums, in which he sang both parts, using his famous falsetto voice.

Louis Jordan recorded a jump blues version of "School Days" in 1949 under the title "School Days (When We Were Kids)". Although it credited the original songwriters, Jordan's record had little in common with earlier versions of the song other than the words of the chorus. The original melody was replaced with a twelve bar blues and the lyrics of most of the verses were replaced with nursery rhymes.
