= Birks' Works (composition) =

1951 jazz standard by Dizzy Gillespie

"Birks' Works" is a 1951 jazz standard written by Dizzy Gillespie. The title refers to Gillespie's middle name, "Birks". It was the title track of Gillespie's 1957 album Birks' Works.

== See also ==
- List of jazz standards
