= Solfeggietto =

1766 keyboard piece by Carl Philipp Emanuel Bach

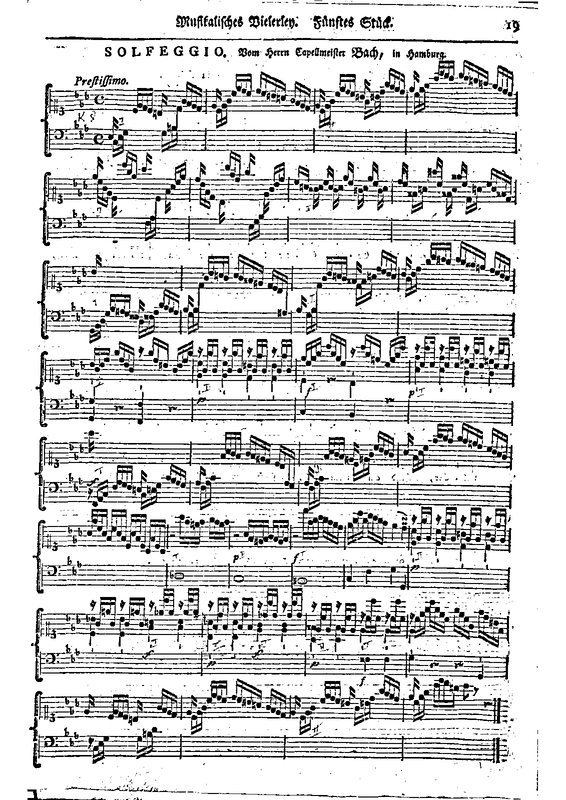
1770 score, published by C.P.E. and Michael Christian Bock. The German title material may be read, "A musical assortment. Fifth piece. / SOLFEGGIO by Herr Kapellmeister Bach, in Hamburg".

Solfeggietto (H 220, Wq. 117: 2) is a short solo keyboard piece in C minor composed in 1766 by Carl Philipp Emanuel Bach. Although the Solfeggietto title is widely used today, the work is correctly called Solfeggio. Thomas Owens refers to the work as a toccata.

== Title ==
The title is puzzling. Emil Sauer offered a speculation: "The word 'Solfeggio' means to apply the syllable names (Note: e.g. "do, re, mi"; see Solfège) to the tones of the scale. This composition, employing, as it does, the broken form of chords in connection with some scale passages, may have suggested to the composer the name "Solfeggietto" on account of a fancied resemblance to a singer rendering these florid passages." The resemblance Sauer notes is indeed "fanciful" in that many passages in the piece involve rapid leaps over several notes, which are easy to play on a keyboard instrument but almost impossible to sing at tempo.

The Italian word solfeggietto is simply the diminutive form of solfeggio; i.e. "little solfeggio'". It is not known how this substituted form (solfeggio appears on the 1770 title page) came into widespread use.

== Qualities ==
Solfeggietto
Played on piano (1:04)

The work is unusual for a keyboard piece in that the main theme and some other passages are fully monophonic, i.e. only one note is played at a time. The piece is commonly assigned to piano students and appears in many anthologies; pedagogically it fosters the playing of an even sixteenth note rhythm by alternating hands.

The tempo mark given in the 1770 published edition is prestissimo. This is the standard marking presto—which already designates a very fast tempo—augmented with the Italian superlative suffix -issimo, hence even faster than presto.

This piece is easily Bach's best-known, to the point that Paul Corneilson's introduction to The Essential C.P.E. Bach is subtitled "Beyond the Solfeggio in C Minor". Owens also describes it as C. P. E. Bach's most famous work.

== Notes ==
=== Sources ===
- Powers, Doris Bosworth (2002). Carl Philipp Emanuel Bach: A Guide to Research. Psychology Press.
- Negri, Paul (2004). Baroque Keyboard Masterpieces: 39 Works by Bach, Handel, Scarlatti, Couperin and Others. Courier Dover Publications.
- Owens, Thomas (1995). Bebop: The Music and Its Players. Oxford: Oxford University Press.
- Corneilson, Paul, ed. (2014). "The Essential C.P.E. Bach". Carl Philipp Emanuel Bach: The Complete Works. Packard Humanities Institute. Archived from the original on 2014-08-25.
- Sauer, Emil, ed. (n.d.). "Solfeggietto and Allegro di Molto" (PDF). St. Louis and London: Art Publication Society.
