= Michel Gaudry =

French jazz musician (1928–2019)

Michel Gaudry (23 September 1928 – 29 May 2019) was a French jazz double-bassist and World War II historian.

== Biography ==
Michel Gaudry was born in Eu, France on 23 September 1928. He learned clarinet and piano as a child before switching to bass. Following studies at the Geneva Conservatory, he played with Michel Hausser, beginning his professional career in 1955. In the latter half of the 1950s he worked with Billie Holiday, Quentin Jackson, Carmen McRae, and Art Simmons. He was very active in the early 1960s, playing with Elek Bacsik, Kenny Clarke, Sonny Criss, Stephane Grappelli, Bud Powell, Stuff Smith, and Billy Strayhorn, as well as continuing a longtime slot as a member of Jack Diéval's group. In the 1970s, he played with Gérard Badini's group, Swing Machine, and was a regular performer at the Grande Parade du Jazz in Nice. In the 1980s he played with Jimmy Owens and Irvin Stokes.

In his later life, he dedicated himself to the history of World War II occupation of Normandy. He died in Saint-Lô on 29 May 2019, at the age of 90.

== Sources ==
- Michel Laplace, "Michel Gaudry". The New Grove Dictionary of Jazz. 2nd edition, ed. Barry Kernfeld.
