= Conception (song) =

1950 jazz standard by George Shearing

"Conception" is a 1949 jazz standard written by George Shearing in the bebop style. The composition is in the key of Db and is noticeable for its chromatic descending chord sequences. The original score was adapted by Miles Davis in 1950, who created an arrangement that kept Shearing's chord changes and main theme, but replaced the composition's bridge and ending with new melodic material. This arrangement is documented on a February 1950 broadcast recording in New York City featuring Stan Getz, J.J. Johnson, and Art Blakey. Davis recorded this same arrangement in October 1951 for his first LP, The New Sounds (Prestige Records, 1951). Davis also did a complete rewrite of "Conception" in 1950 (creating an entire new main theme) for his Birth of the Cool nonet, giving the composition the title "Deception". Recorded in March 1950, "Deception" retained the rewritten bridge melody from Davis's 1950 "Conception" arrangement, as well as Shearing's original chord progression. Davis's 1954 Blue Note recording "Take Off" also uses the "Conception" chord progression, including Davis's own additions to the form (the pedal point introduction, which reappears as an added six measures to the end of the form), but "Take Off" does not include any of Shearing's original melody, and is credited to Davis.

Shearing's original composition was later recorded by artists such as Bud Powell and Kurt Rosenwinkel. Miles Davis's "Conception" arrangement was frequently played and recorded by Chet Baker.

== Authorship ==
Bud Powell biographer Peter Pullman has written that bassist Al McKibbon, clarinetist Buddy DeFranco, composer and saxophonist Gil Melle, and pianist Claude Williamson, all of whom were professional modern jazz musicians in New York City in the early 1950s, have stated in interviews that pianist Bud Powell composed some or all of "Conception", and that Shearing heard and adapted Powell's work. John Coltrane biographer and jazz pianist Lewis Porter disagrees, and has argued that "Conception" is likely the work of Shearing. Porter notes that Shearing's later commercial success and turn from bebop to "middle of the road" instrumental music could have influenced the memories and opinions of the musicians that Pullman cites for evidence. Porter also notes that Shearing moved to New York City in 1947 and immediately immersed himself in the bebop community, writing a handful of bebop pieces prior to "Conception" that are stylistically similar. These pieces include "Delayed Action", "Bop's Your Uncle", and "Trixie", and their authorship has not been challenged.

While Miles Davis immediately adopted "Conception" into his repertoire upon its initial publication, no record exists of Powell playing the composition, or any of its motifs, until 1953. Unlike Davis, Powell played the original published bridge melody of the composition on his live 1953 live recording and his 1955 studio recording for Norgran Records, though this neither proves nor disproves Shearing's authorship.

== See also ==
- List of jazz standards
