= Charlie Parker on Dial =

1993 compilation album by Charlie Parker

Charlie Parker on Dial: The Complete Sessions

Box set by Charlie Parker
- Released: May 26, 1993
- Recorded: Feb 5, 1946 – Dec 17, 1947
- Genres: Jazz, bebop
- Label: Spotlite Jazz

Charlie Parker chronology
Bird: The Complete Charlie Parker on Verve (1990)	Charlie Parker on Dial: The Complete Sessions (1993)	Charlie Parker with Strings (1995)

Charlie Parker on Dial: The Complete Sessions is a 1993 four-disc box set collecting jazz saxophonist and composer Charlie Parker's 1940s recordings for Dial Records. The box set, released by the English label Spotlite Records, assembled into a single package the multi-volume compilation albums the label had released by Spotlite on vinyl in the 1970s under the series title Charlie Parker on Dial. The box set has been critically well received. In 1996, a different box set collecting Parker's work with Dial was assembled by Jazz Classics and released as Complete Charlie Parker on Dial.

Recorded during Parker's tenure with Dial Records between March 28, 1946, and December 17, 1947, these 89 songs have been released multiple times.

== Release history ==
Complete Charlie Parker on Dial cover

In addition to British Spotlite's release in Britain and the United States on vinyl, in the mid-1970s, separately, the collection was published by label Jazz Classics in 1996 as Complete Charlie Parker on Dial and by Stash Records in 2004 as Complete Dial Sessions. The box set, released by Jazz Classics, features 89 songs, including alternate takes and notes composed by jazz historian and Parker biographer Ira Gitler.

John Genarri, author of the book Blowin' Hot and Cool: Jazz and Its Critics, singles out the recording of "Lover Man" on this album, noting that "[t]his wrenching, anguished version...has been called Parker's most poetic statement on record", though, says Gennari, Parker himself viewed it as substandard and threatened physical violence against Ross Russell, a Dial records producer, for including it. Gennari also indicates that other tracks included on this CD—"Relaxin' at Camarillo", "Cheers", "Stupendous" and "Carvin' the Bird"—"have struck many listeners as his most joyous and optimistic."

The collection was also released as a limited-edition LP box set on Warner Brother Records in 1977, and as a general-release two-disc set in 1977.

== Recording history ==
Recording during Parker's tenure with Dial Records between March 28, 1946, and December 17, 1947, these 89 songs have been released multiple times. Spotlite Records in Britain released them in a series of vinyl volumes entitled Charlie Parker on Dial in the 1970s and re-released them on CD in a box set in 1993. They were released in a box set in 2004 by Stash Records. This 1996 box set groups takes and sessions together to allow listeners to closely compare the progression of the material as Parker and his fellow musicians developed it, with jazz improvisation morphing covered material as well as Parker's own compositions into different songs.

== Critical reception ==
Professional ratings
Review scores
Source	Rating
Allmusic	4.5/5 stars

The producers have, according to jazz historian Scott Yanow, collected "every locatable alternate take and rejected excerpt, as well as eight sides privately recorded at a house party" and compiled them with more readily available material. The Blackwell Guide to Recorded Jazz describes the Spotlite box set as "an essential aid in appreciating the scope of Parker's invention from take to take", concluding that "[t]his brilliant body of work is indispensable." The Guardian also describes the recordings as "essential". The UK publication selected the Spotlite box set to represent Parker in its 2007 series on "1000 albums to hear before you die", noting that "timeless themes..., inspired improvising and radical vision make these epochal episodes in modern music". In his review, Yanow notes several problems with the collection, including a "glaring" inaccuracy regarding Parker's medical history in the liner notes and "scratchy surface noise" on some of the tracks, but praises the collection for its informativeness and comprehensiveness, indicating that "those who truly love Charlie Parker will cherish these artifacts, warts and all."

== Track listing ==
Except where otherwise noted, all songs composed by Charlie Parker.

=== Disc 1 ===
1. "Diggin' Diz" (Dizzy Gillespie) – 2:55
2. "Moose the Mooche" – 3:00
3. "Moose the Mooche" – 3:05
4. "Moose the Mooche" – 2:58
5. "Yardbird Suite" – 2:41
6. "Yardbird Suite" – 2:57
7. "Ornithology" – 3:04
8. "Ornithology" ("Bird Lore") – 3:19
9. "Ornithology" – 3:01
10. "A Night in Tunisia" (Excerpt) (Dizzy Gillespie, Frank Paparelli) – :50
11. "A Night in Tunisia" (Gillespie, Paparelli) – 3:07
12. "A Night in Tunisia" (Gillespie, Paparelli) – 3:04
13. "Max Making Wax" (Howard McGhee) – 2:33
14. "Lover Man" (Jimmy David, Roger "Ram" Ramirez, Jimmy Sherman) – 3:22
15. "The Gypsy" (Take) (Billy Reid) – 3:05
16. "Rebop" (Gillespie) – 2:55
17. "Yardbird Suite" – 2:14
18. "Blues on the Sofa" – :47
19. "Kopely Plaza Blues" – 1:06
20. "Lullaby in Rhythm, Pt. 1" (Benny Goodman, Edgar Sampson) – 1:32
21. "Lullaby in Rhythm, Pt. 2" (Goodman, Sampson) – 1:34
22. "Home Cooking (Opus)" (Hal McKusick) – 2:24
23. "Home Cooking (Cherokee)" (Ray Noble) – 2:09
24. "Home Cooking (I Got Rhythm)" (George Gershwin, Ira Gershwin) – 2:27

=== Disc 2 ===
1. "This is Always" (Mack Gordon, Harry Warren) – 3:18
2. "This is Always" (Gordon, Warren) – 3:13
3. "Dark Shadows" (Coleman, Shifty Henry) – 4:06
4. "Dark Shadows" (Coleman, Henry) – 3:13
5. "Dark Shadows" (Coleman, Henry) – 3:09
6. "Dark Shadows" (Coleman, Henry) – 3:01
7. "Bird's Nest" – 2:55
8. "Bird's Nest" – 2:53
9. "Bird's Nest" – 2:46
10. "Cool Blues" (aka "Hot Blues") – 2:01
11. "Cool Blues" (aka "Blowtop Blues") – 2:26
12. "Cool Blues" – 3:11
13. "Cool Blues" – 2:54
14. "Relaxin' at Camarillo" – 3:10
15. "Relaxin' at Camarillo" – 3:09
16. "Relaxin' at Camarillo" – 3:04
17. "Relaxin' at Camarillo" – 3:02
18. "Cheers" (McGhee) – 3:12
19. "Cheers" (McGhee) – 3:07
20. "Cheers" (McGhee) – 3:07
21. "Cheers" (McGhee) – 3:07
22. "Carvin' the Bird" (McGhee) – 2:47
23. "Carvin' the Bird" (McGhee) – 2:47
24. "Stupendous" (Melvin Broiles, McGhee) – 2:57
25. "Stupendous" (Broiles, McGhee) – 2:54

=== Disc 3 ===
1. "Dexterity" – 3:01
2. "Dexterity" – 3:01
3. "Bongo Bop" – 2:48
4. "Bongo Bop" – 2:47
5. "Dewey Square" (aka "Prezology") – 3:32
6. "Dewey Square" – 3:05
7. "Dewey Square" – 3:11
8. "The Hymn" – 2:34
9. "The Hymn" – 2:31
10. "All the Things You Are" (Jerome Kern) – 3:11
11. "Bird of Paradise" – 3:13
12. "Bird of Paradise" – 3:13
13. "Embraceable You" (Gershwin, Gershwin) – 3:49
14. "Embraceable You" (Gershwin, Gershwin) – 3:26
15. "Bird Feathers" – 2:54
16. "Klact-Oveeseds-Tene" – 3:08
17. "Klact-Oveeseds-Tene" – 3:09
18. "Scrapple from the Apple" – 2:42
19. "Little Be Bop" – 2:58

=== Disc 4 ===
1. "My Old Flame" (Sam Coslow, Arthur Johnston) – 3:17
2. "Out of Nowhere" (Johnny Green, Edward Heyman) – 4:06
3. "Out of Nowhere" (Green, Heyman) – 3:53
4. "Out of Nowhere" (Green, Heyman) – 3:08
5. "Don't Blame Me" (Jimmy McHugh) – 2:51
6. "Drifting on a Reed" (aka "Giant Swing") – 2:59
7. "Drifting on a Reed" – 2:56
8. "Drifting on a Reed" (aka "Air Conditioning") – 2:55
9. "Quasimado" – 2:57
10. "Quasimado" – 2:55
11. "Charlie's Wig" – 2:49
12. "Charlie's Wig" – 2:49
13. "Charlie's Wig" – 2:45
14. "Bongo Beep" (aka "Dexterity") – 3:00
15. "Bongo Beep" (aka "Bird Feathers") – 3:00
16. "Crazeology" (Excerpt) (Little Benny Harris) – 1:03
17. "Crazeology" (Excerpt) (Harris) – :35
18. "Crazeology" (Harris) – 3:00
19. "Crazeology" (Harris) – 3:00
20. "How Deep is the Ocean?" (Irving Berlin) – 3:26
21. "How Deep is the Ocean?" (Berlin) – 3:07

== Eight-volume vinyl set ==
Initially, Spotlite Records released the Dial recordings in a six-volume vinyl LP set in 1970. The subsequent release of two additional albums incorporated material from 1948, including a session with Tadd Dameron's Orchestra, featuring performances by tenor saxophonists Allen Eager and Wardell Gray.

Charlie Parker on Dial, Vols. 1 – 8

Compilation album by Charlie Parker
- Recorded: June 6, 1945 – September, 1948
- Genres: Jazz, bebop
- Label: Spotlite Records

Professional ratings
Review scores
Source	Rating
Volume 1: Allmusic	link
Volume 2: Allmusic	link
Volume 3: Allmusic	link
Volume 4: Allmusic	link
Volume 5: Allmusic	link
Volume 6: Allmusic	link
Volume 7: Allmusic	link
Volume 8: Allmusic	link

=== Volume 1 ===
- Recorded: Feb 5, 1946 – Jul 29, 1946

The first volume features several sessions. In one, Parker and Dizzy Gillespie perform "Diggin' Diz". In another, described by Yanow as "superior", Parker and Miles Davis on trumpet lead a West Coast septet through several Parker standards, with variant takes. The final session on the album features Parker in performance with a Howard McGhee-led quintet where, according to Yanow, Parker's performance is seriously hampered by his poor physical condition.

=== Volume 2 ===
- Recorded: Feb 19, 1947

This volume features the first session, including alternate takes, that Parker recorded following his hospitalization at Camarillo State Hospital in 1947. He is accompanied by the Erroll Garner trio, with vocalist Earl Coleman.

=== Volume 3 ===
- Recorded: Feb 1, 1947 – Feb 26, 1947

The majority of the third volume features Parker in session with Red Callender on double bass, Gray on tenor saxophone, Barney Kessel on guitar, Don Lamond on drum, McGhee on trumpet, and Dodo Marmarosa on piano. Although the rest of the album has more historical significance than sound quality, Yanow describes the volume as "excellent" and recommends it.

=== Volume 4 ===
- Recorded: Oct 28, 1947

The fourth volume presents Parker in performance with his 1947 quintet, featuring musicians Davis on trumpet, Duke Jordan on piano and Max Roach on drums. The album features six classics and 10 alternative takes. In his review, Yanow indicates that "this influential bop music...is full of brilliant moments".

=== Volume 5 ===
- Recorded: Jun 6, 1945 – Nov 4, 1947

Primarily from a session on November 4, 1947, the 5th volume again features Parker with his 1947 quintet. Additionally, it includes tracks featuring vocals by Earl Coleman and a 1945 performance of "Hallelujah" with Parker and Gillespie in support of vibraphonist Red Norvo.

=== Volume 6 ===
- Recorded: Dec 17, 1947

Concluding the original six-volume run, Parker's quintet became a sextet with the addition of J.J. Johnson on trombone.

=== Volume 7 ===
- Recorded: Feb 1, 1947 – Sep 20, 1947

Spotlite LP107, officially titled Lullaby in Rhythm Featuring Charlie Parker, presents several Parker solos along with two radio sessions featuring Parker with Gillespie, Billy Bauer on guitar, Ray Brown on double bass, John LaPorta on clarinet, Roach on drums and Lennie Tristano on piano.

=== Volume 8 ===
- Recorded: Nov 8, 1947 – Sep 1948

Spotlite 108—Anthropology—the final volume of the series, featured tracks taken primarily from a radio broadcast on November 8, 1947, where Parker played with Barry Ulanov and His All-Star Metronome Jazzmen. The group featured Bauer on guitar, Allen Eager on tenor saxophone, LaPorta on clarinet, Fats Navarro on trumpet, Tommy Potter on double bass, Buddy Rich on drums, Tristano on piano, and, singing on "Everything I Have Is Yours", Sarah Vaughan. Additional material was taken from a set with Tadd Dameron's Orchestra, featuring performances by Eager and Gray.

== Personnel ==
=== Performance ===
- Melvin Broiles – trumpet
- Jimmy Bunn – piano
- Red Callender – bass
- Earl Coleman – vocals
- Miles Davis – trumpet
- Arnold Fishkind – bass
- Russ Freeman – piano
- Erroll Garner – piano
- Arv Garrison – guitar
- Dizzy Gillespie – trumpet
- Wardell Gray – sax (tenor)
- George Handy – piano
- J.J. Johnson – trombone
- Duke Jordan – piano
- Barney Kessel – guitar
- Bob "Dingbod" Kesterson – bass
- Don Lamond – drums
- Stan Levey – drums
- Dodo Marmarosa – piano
- Howard McGhee – trumpet
- Vic McMillan – bass
- Charlie Parker – sax (alto)
- Roy Porter – drums
- Tommy Potter – bass
- Jimmy Pratt – drums
- Max Roach – drums
- Shorty Rogers – trumpet
- Lucky Thompson – sax (tenor)
- Harold "Doc" West – drums

=== Production ===
- Ross Russell – liner notes
- Malcolm Walker – graphic design
- Tony Williams – liner notes
