= Charlie Parker's Savoy and Dial sessions =

American jazz music sessions (1945–48)

This article lists Charlie Parker's Savoy and Dial sessions as leader, which were recorded between 1945 and 1948.

Also included is Miles Davis's first session as leader in 1947, with Parker on tenor saxophone (Session 7).

== Session 1 ==
Charlie Parker's Reboppers. Recorded November 26, 1945, in New York City for Savoy Records.

1. "Billie's Bounce"
2. "Warming Up a Riff"
3. "Now's the Time"
4. "Thriving from a Riff" (a.k.a. "Anthropology")
5. "Meandering" (based on "Embraceable You")
6. "Ko-Ko" (based on "Cherokee")

Charlie Parker (alto sax), Miles Davis (trumpet, 1,3,4), Dizzy Gillespie (trumpet, 6; piano, 1,3,5,6), Sadik Hakim (piano, 2,4), Curley Russell (bass), Max Roach (drums)

== Session 2 ==
Charlie Parker Septet. Recorded March 28, 1946, in Hollywood for Dial Records.

1. "Moose the Mooche"
2. "Yardbird Suite"
3. "Ornithology" (based on "How High the Moon")
4. "A Night in Tunisia"

Charlie Parker (alto sax), Miles Davis (trumpet), Lucky Thompson (tenor sax), Dodo Marmarosa (piano), Arv Garrison (guitar), Vic McMillan (bass), Roy Porter (drums)

== Session 3 ==
Charlie Parker Quintet. Recorded July 29, 1946, in Hollywood for Dial Records.

1. "Max Is Making Wax"
2. "Lover Man"
3. "The Gypsy"
4. "Bebop"

Charlie Parker (alto sax), Howard McGhee (trumpet), Jimmy Bunn (piano), Bob Kesterson (bass), Roy Porter (drums)

== Session 4 ==
Charlie Parker Quartet. Recorded February 19, 1947, in Hollywood for Dial Records.

1. "This Is Always"
2. "Dark Shadows"
3. "Bird's Nest"
4. "Cool Blues"

Charlie Parker (alto sax), Erroll Garner (piano), Red Callender (bass), Doc West (drums), Earl Coleman (vocals on 1 and 2)

== Session 5 ==
Charlie Parker's New Stars. Recorded February 26, 1947, in Hollywood for Dial Records.

1. "Relaxin' at Camarillo"
2. "Cheers"
3. "Carvin' the Bird"
4. "Stupendous"

Charlie Parker (alto sax), Howard McGhee (trumpet), Wardell Gray (tenor sax), Dodo Marmarosa (piano), Barney Kessel (guitar), Red Callender (bass), Don Lamond (drums)

== Session 6 ==
Charlie Parker Quintet. Recorded May 8, 1947, in New York City for Savoy Records.

1. "Donna Lee" (based on "Back Home Again in Indiana")
2. "Chasin' the Bird"
3. "Cheryl"
4. "Buzzy"

Charlie Parker (alto sax), Miles Davis (trumpet), Bud Powell (piano), Tommy Potter (bass), Max Roach (drums)

== Session 7 ==
Miles Davis All Stars, Recorded August 14, 1947, in New York City for Savoy Records.

1. "Milestones"
2. "Little Willie Leaps" (based on "All God's Chillun Got Rhythm")
3. "Half Nelson"
4. "Sippin' at Bells"

Miles Davis (trumpet), Charlie Parker (tenor sax), John Lewis (piano), Nelson Boyd (bass), Max Roach (drums)

== Session 8 ==
Charlie Parker Quintet. Recorded October 28, 1947, in New York City for Dial Records.

1. "Dexterity"
2. "Bongo Bop"
3. "Dewey Square"
4. "The Hymn"
5. "Bird of Paradise" (based on "All The Things You Are")
6. "Embraceable You"

Charlie Parker (alto sax), Miles Davis (trumpet), Duke Jordan (piano), Tommy Potter (bass), Max Roach (drums)

== Session 9 ==
Charlie Parker Quintet. Recorded November 4, 1947, in New York City for Dial Records.

1. "Bird Feathers"
2. "Klact-Oveereds-Tene"
3. "Scrapple from the Apple"
4. "My Old Flame"
5. "Out of Nowhere"
6. "Don't Blame Me"

Charlie Parker (alto sax), Miles Davis (trumpet), Duke Jordan (piano), Tommy Potter (bass), Max Roach (drums)

== Session 10 ==
Charlie Parker Sextet. Recorded December 17, 1947, in New York City for Dial Records.

1. "Drifting on a Reed"
2. "Quasimodo" (based on "Embraceable You")
3. "Charlie's Wig"
4. "Bongo Beep"
5. "Crazeology"
6. "How Deep Is the Ocean"

Charlie Parker (alto sax), Miles Davis (trumpet), J.J. Johnson (trombone), Duke Jordan (piano), Tommy Potter (bass), Max Roach (drums)

== Session 11 ==
Charlie Parker Quintet. Recorded December 21, 1947, In Detroit, Michigan, for Savoy Records.

1. "Another Hair-Do"
2. "Bluebird"
3. "Klauntsance"
4. "Bird Gets the Worm"

Charlie Parker (alto sax), Miles Davis (trumpet), Duke Jordan (piano), Tommy Potter (bass), Max Roach (drums)

== Session 12 ==
Charlie Parker All Stars. Recorded September 18, 1948, in New York City for Savoy Records.

1. "Barbados"
2. "Ah-Leu-Cha"
3. "Constellation"
4. "Parker's Mood"

Charlie Parker (alto sax), Miles Davis (trumpet) except track 4, John Lewis (piano), Curley Russell (bass), Max Roach (drums)

== Session 13 ==
Charlie Parker All Stars. Recorded September 24, 1948, in New York City for Savoy Records.

1. "Perhaps"
2. "Marmaduke"
3. "Steeplechase"
4. "Merry-Go-Round"

Charlie Parker (alto sax), Miles Davis (trumpet), John Lewis (piano), Curley Russell (bass), Max Roach (drums)
