= Jacques-Louis Monod =

French composer, pianist and conductor

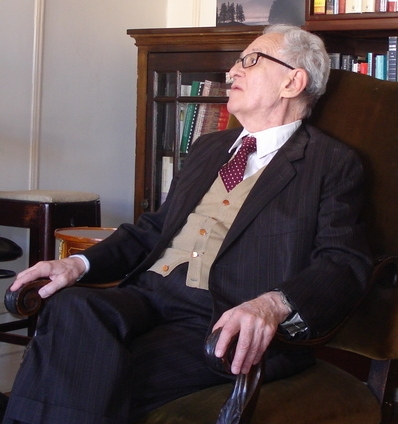
Jacques-Louis Monod in 2009

Jacques-Louis Monod (25 February 1927 – 21 September 2020) was a French composer, pianist and conductor of 20th century and contemporary music, particularly in the advancement of the music of Charles Ives, Edgard Varèse, Arnold Schoenberg, Anton Webern and uptown music; and was active primarily in New York City and London during the second half of the twentieth century.

== Biography ==
=== Paris 1940s: early years ===
Monod was born in Asnières (now Asnières-sur-Seine), a northwestern suburb of Paris, to an affluent family of privilege and of French Protestant affiliation with ancestral roots in French-speaking Switzerland His musical prowess was detected early when he enrolled in 1933 at the Paris Conservatoire National Supérieur de Musique as a child prodigy at the age of six, below the official minimum age of nine. Monod attended the Paris Conservatoire intermittently but remained registered for nearly 20 years, obtaining his Doctorat in 1952. Monod's teachers at the Conservatoire were Yves Nat and Olivier Messiaen; including master classes under the visiting conductor, Herbert von Karajan; he also studied with his godfather, Paul-Silva Hérard, the organist at Paris's St. Ambroise Church.

A decisive turning point for Monod occurred in 1944 at the age of 17, when he took private lessons in composition and theory for five years, subsequently remaining a lifelong supporter and president of an association promoting the music of the French composer and conductor René Leibowitz, a Webern disciple and émigré from Warsaw, Poland (rumor has it that during the German occupation of France, which lasted until December 1944, the young Monod surreptitiously brought food to Leibowitz, a member of the French Resistance). Leibowitz, who was an outsider among the French musical establishment, and a major catalyst in the promotion of Schoenberg's music and in the subsequent development of serial music in Paris after WW II, became Monod's principal teacher and mentor within a circle of devoted pupils, including Jean Prodromidès, Antoine Duhamel, Pierre Chan, Michel Philippot, Serge Nigg, André Casanova, Claude Helffer, and for a brief period, Pierre Boulez.

Monod's debut (1949) as a pianist took place in Paris at a concert organized by Leibowitz for Schoenberg's 75th birthday. His performance in the European premiere of Schoenberg's Phantasy for Violin and Piano Accompaniment, Op. 47, missed being the world premiere by only a few hours (the world premiere took place in Los Angeles on 13 September 1949, with Leonard Stein on piano and Adolph Koldofsky on violin).

=== New York City 1950s ===
==== Pianist and the Dial recordings ====
Soon after Leibowitz's earliest travels to the United States (first in 1947 to visit Schoenberg in Los Angeles), Monod followed, accompanying Leibowitz to New York City in 1950. Whereas, the noted pianist Charles Rosen claims to have heard Monod perform Milton Babbitt's The Widow's Lament in Springtime as early as 1945 or 1946 at Princeton – and yet the work was not composed until 1951.

At a time when the musics of Schoenberg, Berg, and Webern were least performed in America, Monod was among their earliest champions. He spent much of the 1950s as a pianist, performing works of the Second Viennese School for piano and voice, similar to the careers of pianists E. Steuermann; P. Stadlen; C. Helffer; Paul Jacobs; the Viennese pianist, Karl Steiner; and the American pianist, L. Stein. Under the direction of Leibowitz, Monod performed and recorded the piano part of Berg's Chamber Concerto and Schoenberg's Ode to Napoleon Bonaparte, Op. 41; and more importantly, Monod also performed on historic recordings of chamber music by Webern for the Dial Records label in the early 1950s (a label founded by Ross Russell, who also produced historic jazz recordings of Charlie Parker, Max Roach and Miles Davis), including the earliest recordings of Webern's Symphony, Op. 21, conducted by Leibowitz with the Paris Chamber Orchestra; the Concerto for nine instruments, Op. 24; the Variations for Piano, Op. 27, performed by Monod; the Four Songs, Op. 12, performed by the American virtuosic soprano Bethany Beardslee with Monod on piano; and the Quartet for tenor saxophone, clarinet, violin, and piano, Op. 22.

On 18 December 1950, Monod performed in a special concert of Alban Berg's chamber music at Juilliard, featuring the American premiere of Berg's Two Songs with Beardslee. The duo also performed Berg's Seven Early Songs (1905–08) and Four Songs, Op. 2 (1908–10).

Monod also promoted other musics in addition to the music of the Second Viennese School on 24 January 1954, the Three Japanese Lyrics, composed by Igor Stravinsky in 1912–13, received their Carnegie Hall premiere in Carnegie Recital Hall (now Weill Recital Hall) with Beardslee, soprano; the pianist Russell Sherman; and a chamber ensemble conducted by Monod. Also evident during Monod's residency in the USA was his extraordinary analytical ability: while attending a Columbia graduate 20th-century-music seminar taught by the Varèse disciple Chou Wen-chung, Monod's cogent analysis of Varèse's Ionisation led to his teaching the remainder of the course. Monod's studies at Columbia University during the 1950s would eventually lead by the early 1970s to an Associate Professorship position at Columbia's music department, wherein Monod with the former Schoenberg pupil and specialist in medieval music theory, Patricia Carpenter, were instrumental in establishing the department's undergraduate and graduate core curricula.

==== Conductor of Webern and influence on New York serialism ====
Beginning in the early 1950s and concurrently at the International Summer Course for New Music in Darmstadt, Germany wherein the music of Anton Webern was performed and promoted among the "new" avant-garde, Monod instead focused not on the emerging European avant-garde movement with the music of Webern as their model, but on the significance of Webern's music following the death of Schoenberg (1951) with growing interest among the northeast American academia. Monod directed American premieres of many works of Webern, assisting Richard Franko Goldman (of Goldman Band notoriety) in directing the first all-Webern concert in the USA (and the first all-Webern concert in Paris during 1951, according to liner notes from a 1976 CRI LP), which took place in New York City on 8 May 1951, and included the world premiere of Webern's Five Canons on Latin Texts. On 16 March 1952, Monod gave the world premieres of Webern's Three Traditional Rhymes, Op. 17, and the Three Songs on Poems of Hildegard Jone, Op. 25, all with his then wife, Bethany Beardslee, with whom for years, they gave critically acclaimed concerts of new music with the Camera Concerts under Monod's directorship. Further, Beardslee wrote in her autobiography of another all-Webern concert given on 28 December 1952 at Kaufmann Concert Hall, located at New York City's 92nd Street Y on Lexington Avenue with Igor Stravinsky and Robert Craft present.

Hermann Scherchen (with an introduction by Pierre Boulez) premiered Edgard Varèse's Déserts in Paris on 20 January 1954; while Monod gave its American premiere at Town Hall in December 1955, with Varèse controlling the Ampex tape recorder. In 1956, Monod received an Award from the American Academy of Arts and Letters for his creative work in music.

=== London 1960s ===
Many of Schoenberg's and Webern's disciples had relocated to Great Britain during the 1930s as a result of the rise of National Socialism (e.g., E. Wellesz, E. Stein. W. Goehr, R. Gerhard, T. W. Adorno, K. Rankl, L. Spinner, E. Cross, P. Stadlen, E. Spira, etc.). In 1960–67, "during his seven years as the conductor for the BBC Third Program, he [i.e. Monod] presented a live concert broadcast of new music every Tuesday throughout the concert season. Each program was different and was broadcast internationally to a wide listening audience ... [Monod] has conducted major orchestras and chamber ensembles in Europe, Scandinavia, and North and Central America" (Equinox Music CD 0101 Liner Notes). A notable performance took place on Tuesday evening, 21 December 1965 with Monod conducting the British premiere of Kurt Weill's school opera composed in 1930, Der Jasager, based on a libretto by Bertolt Brecht and after a Japanese Noh-play, as reported by David Drew.

=== New York City 1970s–1990s ===
In 1975 he founded, and for 20 years served as president of the Guild of Composers, a New York-based group that produced concerts of "uptown" contemporary music. At the Guild of Composers concerts, which often took place at Columbia University's Miller Theater, performances included the music of Elliott Carter, Arthur Berger, Claudio Spies, Mario Davidovsky, Seymour Shifrin, Earl Kim, Donald Martino, George Edwards, Robert Helps, David Lewin, Fred Lerdahl; and Milton Babbitt, who composed an earlier work, Du, dedicated to Monod and Ms. Beardslee. From 1995 until 2000, concerts of the Guild of Composers were directed by the Monod protégé, the Princeton- and Columbia-educated American composer and conductor, Daniel Plante.

Monod was a major proponent in New York City of "non-experimental" serialism, promoting the music of American composers primarily from the Northeast academic elite, Columbia-Princeton "axis" (and to a lesser degree from Harvard) at the Guild of Composers concerts. The music performed for 25 years at the Guild of Composers concerts exemplified an ideological view that contemporary American music remains very much a part of the Western polyphonic tradition.

Throughout much of the 1970s and 1980s, Monod also continued to perform the music of Schoenberg in New York City, leading the music critic Allan Kozinn to write an article published in the New York Times acknowledging Monod as the "Guardian of the Schoenberg Flame", wherein Monod is quoted to have stated the following concerning his conducting demands:

Roughly speaking, my experience has proved that you need at least one hour of rehearsal for every minute of music. Less than that, and you cannot do justice to the piece. You also need good players—ideally, I prefer musicians who have worked together, and who have worked with me before. I have a very short fuse when I have to waste time on elementary things. And if possible, I like to use my own marked scores and parts. I'm talking about an ethical approach to performing, and the conditions that justify the performance of a work. If someone asks me to conduct, but cannot give me the conditions I need, well, it's very easy for me to live without conducting.

His promotion of Schoenberg include a notable performance in the early 1980s of Schoenberg's Pierrot lunaire, Op. 21, with commentary by George Perle.

=== Death ===
Monod died on 21 September 2020 in Toulouse, France at the age of 93.

== Music ==
=== List of compositions ===
Monod's music is published by the Jerona Music Corporation and Schott Music Publishing.

A partial list of Monod's compositions include works from the series, Cantus Contra Cantum:

- Organ Piece (undated)
- Chamber Aria (1952) (or the Passacaglia)
- Cantus Contra Cantum I (1968/1980) for Soprano and Chamber Orchestra
- Cantus Contra Cantum II (1973) for Violin and Cello
- Cantus Contra Cantum III (1976) for Chorus (a Piano reduction exists)
- Cantus Contra Cantum IV (Tränen des Vaterlandes—Anno 1636) (1978) for Mixed Chorus and Sackbuts or Trombones
- Cantus Contra Cantum V for Orchestra
- Cantus Contra Cantum VI for Mixed Choir and Chamber Orchestra
- 2 Elegies (1978) (incl. Canonic Vocalise, 1978)

=== Style and ideology ===
There are three phases of development in Monod's oeuvre: first, his initial education in Paris during the 1930s and 1940s, bearing distinctively French influences and characteristics as to his role in the origins of serialism in France (e.g., extensive training at the Paris Conservatoire, including studies under Messiaen and later, private studies under Leibowitz); followed by his relocation abroad during the 1950s and 1960s to NYC and London as a pianist and conductor of the New Music, with the advancement of music by composers of non-French origins, particularly American music (e.g., C. Ives, E. Carter, M. Babbitt and S. Shifrin) and the music of Schoenberg, Webern and the serial movement (e.g., A. Berg, A. Webern, R. Gerhard, E. I. Kahn, L. Spinner, E. Krenek, L. Nono, et al.), including the music of a fellow émigré, Varèse; and thirdly, his own musical legacy as a composer and pedagogue at music schools in the Northeast during the 1970s and 1980s, primarily at Columbia University and at the Guild of Composers concerts with the advancement of a post-Schoenbergian generation of "non-experimental" polyphonic music by American composers—many who were directly associated with Monod.

=== Cantus Contra Cantum and advanced polyphony ===
Monod's music is based upon historical precedents of Webern's music and represents the French school of post-WWII serialism, combined with subtle lyricism. Among his early works, only the Chamber Aria (or the Passacaglia) from 1952 has been published. His doctoral dissertation – a second doctorate – was completed with distinction at Columbia in 1975 and assisted by the Princeton- and Columbia educated pianist-composer and a Babbitt-Monod disciple, Thomas S. James, consisting of a detailed exposition on the compositional premise of his seminal work, Cantus Contra Cantum II for Violin and Cello: music which represents a tour de force in rhythmic and serial complexity. It is dedicated to the violinist Rose Mary Harbison, wife of the composer John Harbison.

Monod's music has been performed sparingly and has yet to be fully recognized. As in the music of Webern, there are no extraneous musical elements nor is there any degree of fortuitousness in Monod's rigorously composed music, which gives the discerning listener a means to distinguish musical relationships with aesthetically compelling results. The strict formal characteristics of his non-experimental and non-improvisational, highly controlled music requires superior technical abilities on the part of performers. Moreover, the overly-mechanical and superficial aspects exhibited in some earlier works of integral or total serialism are entirely absent and circumvented in Monod's music; which as a result, provides listeners with lyrical attributes. Monod has set many of his works to texts by French poets, such as Éluard, Valéry, Renard and René Char.

The title for his extensive cycle of serial compositions composed during the course of the past forty years, namely "Cantus Contra Cantum", refers to the late-medieval concept of "line against line" as a progression beyond "punctus contra punctum", i.e., creating advanced music that is correlated to the development of modern Western polyphony: "music-synergy", wherein the interaction of two or more parts or voices in each work creates a combined effect that is greater than the sum of their individual effects. Monod's music is the subject of a doctoral study by New York-based composer Manuel Sosa's 2002 DMA dissertation for Juilliard, entitled, "Jacques-Louis Monod's Cantus Contra Cantum III : a preliminary inquiry".

In 1979, the ISCM in New York City performed his Cantus Contra Cantum I for soprano and chamber orchestra, the first of a series of works that realizes Monod's advancement of a polyphonic "langue". Other than his editorial work, Monod has written sparingly on his own works and music of other composers. The few available writings by Monod are liner notes from a 2010 New World Records reissue (NWCRL358) of a 1972 recording of his Cantus Contra Cantum I:

My Cantus Contra Cantum I, (1972) is a song cycle in one movement for woman's voice and chamber ensemble. It is made up of seven sections: The first and the last are hummed vocalises, and the middle five are settings of French texts by Paul Éluard and Jean Senn (chosen for their complementary treatment of the imagery germinating from the word visage).

The work is part of a group of three compositions written between 1968 and 1976 including a duo for violin and cello (Cantus Contra Cantum II) and a set of three vocalises for double chorus (SATB) a cappella (Cantus Contra Cantum III).

There is unfortunately very little a composer can do to assist the non-professional listener toward an understanding of his work, for a transliteration of his creative statement will be in the best of circumstances a tautology. Further, it may obscure the interaction between the author's and the listener's aesthetic proclivities by dissociating the work from that perceptual level, where the listener experiences the discipline's long standing association with the cultural context. Thus, I will agree with Naum Gabo 'that a work of art restricted to what the artist has put in it is only part of itself', and that 'it only attains full stature with what people and time make of it'.

— Horizon 10, no. 53, July 1944

For both the non-professional and professional listener, understanding will begin with and depend upon the intensity of intuitive perception and the desire for a significant aesthetic experience that transcends the measurable assets of a given discipline. "Together with the apprehension of concepts and the acquisition of information, professional understanding will achieve cultural significance through the eventual enrichment of a compositional technique that will serve a broader aesthetic responsibility than that of an ideology which relegates aesthetic consideration to that of a surface event. (NWLCRL358)

More recent performances took place in New York City during February 1987 and in March 1989 of his provocative, "Tränen des Vaterlandes—Anno 1636" (Cantus Contra Cantum IV), a four-minute choral work accompanied by "sackbuts", based upon "a gruesome poetic depiction of carnage and devastation by Andreas Gryphius ... [the music is] stark but appropriate for the horrors described"; and his two a capella works, Elergies, evoking "the ghost of Anton Webern ... music as exquisitely beautiful as any this listener has heard in some time". And nearly thirty years later on 3 March 2017, the Association for the Promotion of New Music devoted an evening of music to Monod with a choral concert in New York City that included compositions written over the last 40 years.

== Editor of Schoenberg, Webern and Ives ==
Monod also edited numerous works for publication at Mobart Music Publications/Boelke-Bomart, Inc. (now part of Jerona Music Corp.), founded by Walter Boelke and initially edited by a Webern pupil, Kurt List; and Schott Music Publishing. These scores include Charles Ives' Central Park in the Dark, Hallowe'en and The Pond; and Schoenberg's Kol nidre, Op. 39 and the Three Songs, Op. 48; and two works that are arguably among Schoenberg's greatest works from his late period, namely the String Trio, Op. 45, and A Survivor from Warsaw, Op. 46; and Webern's Quintet for Strings and Piano.

Monod's editions of Schoenberg's music have been described as the standard by which other [editions] are to be judged. In 1983, Monod edited and published at Mobart, "René Leibowitz 1913–1972. A Register of His Works and Writings".

== Monod papers at Stanford ==
In 2013, Monod deposited a collection of his letters, music manuscripts and analyses, theoretical writings, etc. dating from 1952 until 1982 to the Green Library at Stanford University in the Department of Special Collections and University Archives, Stanford University Libraries, Stanford, California. Included are letters with the Schoenberg family, René Leibowitz, Elliot Carter, Milton Babbitt, Michel Philippot, et al.

More recently, Monod deposited an additional voluminous collection of musical scores, letters, etc. to Stanford, as reported in an 13 October 2017, online blog by the head Librarian of their Music Division, Jerry L. McBride, the former archivist at the Schoenberg Institute at USC. McBride writes: "In 2016 and 2017, many manuscript scores of Monod's own compositions were added to the collection dating from 1967 to the present, as he continues to compose new works."

== Teacher at Columbia and Juilliard ==
Over the years, Monod had given private lessons to talented musicians, including those influenced by mathematics and the computer sciences: many occupy various professional positions in the US and abroad in the areas of conducting, composition, and theory. Although a compilation of Monod's students haven't yet been written, details on his many students can be found throughout the Internet. He taught primarily in New York City at Columbia and at the Juilliard School with guest lectureships at Princeton, Harvard and Brandeis.

Monod also taught conducting to many who have specialized in this profession, including Peter Schubert, Michael Alexander Willens, Gilbert Levine, Markand Thakar, Joel Eric Suben, Peter Frewen, Rachael Worby, David Leibowitz, Richard Fletcher, et al.

== Association for the Promotion of New Music ==
In 1975, in addition to the Guild of Composers concerts, Monod established a new music publishing firm, the Association for the Promotion of New Music (APNM), consisting of many works representative of the New York "uptown" movement and beyond. Monod, Mario Davidovsky, and Fred Lerdahl are Honorary Members of the Board with many former pupils of Monod's serving on the Board of Directors. Notable works include music performed at the Guild of Composers concerts and music of Eduard Steuermann, Roger Sessions, Edward T. Cone, Arthur Berger, Godfrey Winham, Will Ogdon, Ursula Mamlok, Rolv Yttrehus, George Edwards, Philip Batstone, Robert Ceely, Mark Hagerty, et al. Monod has also edited music for APNM, including Godfrey Winham's Composition for Orchestra and Stephen Peles' Intermezzo for solo piano.

== Personal life and close associates ==
Monod was previously married to the soprano Bethany Beardslee; and later, to a translator of German descent, Margrit Auhagen.

His closest associates in America include the composers Earl Kim, Seymour Shifrin, Arthur Berger, Mario Davidovsky, Claudio Spies, and Malcolm Peyton; and in France, Michel Philippot.

Monod resided in Toulouse in the south of France.

=== Notable relatives ===
Monod was descended from one of the oldest families of the French (but of Swiss origin) Protestant bourgeoisie with a history since the Napoleonic era of wide-ranging influences in French government, theology, the sciences and medicine with two Nobel laureates, banking and the arts. His great-great-grandfather Adolphe Monod was a noted pastor and theologian. His father Pierre Monod was a noted surgeon. His cousins include the naturalist Théodore Monod; the industrialist-politician Jérôme Monod; Jacques Lucien Monod, the Nobel Prize-winning biologist; the pharmacologist Daniel Bovet, who won the Nobel Prize in Medicine; and the French New Wave film director Jean-Luc Godard.
