= Yardbird Suite =

1946 jazz composition by Charlie Parker

"Yardbird Suite" is a bebop standard composed by jazz saxophonist Charlie Parker in 1946. The title combines Parker's nickname "Yardbird" (often shortened to "Bird") and a colloquial use of the classical music term "suite" (in a manner similar to such jazz titles as Lester Young's "Midnight Symphony" and Duke Ellington's "Ebony Rhapsody"). The composition uses an 32-bar AABA form. The "graceful, hip melody, became something of an anthem for beboppers."

== Three Charlie Parker recordings ==
Although fans used to follow Parker everywhere he played and often taped his performances, there are only three known commercial recordings of Parker himself playing the tune. The first two were recorded with a septet at Radio Recorders in Hollywood on March 28, 1946. The session was supervised and produced by Ross Russell for his Dial Records label. Besides Parker on alto saxophone was Miles Davis on trumpet, Lucky Thompson on tenor saxophone, pianist Dodo Marmarosa, Arvin Garrison on electric guitar, bassist Vic McMillan, and Roy Porter on drums. The last of four takes became the master (takes two and three are lost), released as 78 shellac single (D 1003).

Never copyrighted, the track was frequently reissued on single 10" EP and, since the mid-1950s, on LP on various labels, in most part together with Parker's other Dial recordings although often also on albums assigned to Miles Davis.

The third known recording of "Yardbird Suite" was a session at the home of Chuck Copely in Hollywood, on February 1, 1947, also recorded by Ross Russell of Dial Records. The track itself is incomplete and, like the two versions of "Lullaby in Rhythm" recorded that day, of poor quality, but nevertheless released on Spotlite, initially in 1972 on Lullaby in Rhythm Featuring Charlie Parker.

There are two other recordings of Parker playing the song live, one at the Three Deuces, the other at the Onyx club, recorded by Dean Benedetti.

The Charlie Parker Septet's 1946 master recording of the song was inducted into the Grammy Hall of Fame in 2014.

== Recordings by others ==
In 1947, a year after the original recording, Gil Evans had already written an arrangement for Claude Thornhill and His Orchestra in 1947, recorded with Lee Konitz on alto saxophone. Fellow bebop musicians like Al Haig, Bud Powell, Max Roach and Gene Ammons played and recorded the song as well as Gene Krupa with a big band arrangement by Gerry Mulligan in 1958.

Many of the recordings featuring the song are explicit tribute albums to Charlie Parker or a homage to the bebop revolution of the 1940s (cf. album titles in list below). Most interpretations follow the bebop or hard bop idiom. Exceptions may be e.g. the Modern Jazz Quartet that rewrote the song in their chamber music style (At Music Inn, Vol 2, 1958). Junior Cook played the tune quiet fast and ends his version citing John Coltrane, whereas Joe Lovano begins his twelve-minute-long interpretation as free floating ballad, then taking up speed in 6/8. Even former free jazz musicians like Archie Shepp and Anthony Braxton remember the avantgarde prior to them, but "pay tribute to the spirit and chance-taking of Charlie Parker rather than to merely recreate the past."

== Other versions ==
- Sadao Watanabe – Birds of Paradise (1977)
- Karrin Allyson – Azure-Té (1995)
- Bob Dorough – Devil May Care (1956)
- Hampton Hawes – Four (1958)
- Eddie Jefferson – Come Along with Me (1969)
- Joe Lovano – Bird Songs (2010)
- Jimmy McGriff – Fly Dude (1972)
- Jay McShann – The Man from Muskogee (1972)
- Frank Morgan – Yardbird Suite (1988)
- Claude Thornhill with Lee Konitz – 1947

== See also ==
- Charlie Parker's Savoy and Dial sessions
- List of jazz contrafacts
