= Roy Porter (drummer) =

American jazz musician

- Born: July 30, 1923; Walsenburg, Colorado, U.S.
- Died: January 24, 1998 (aged 75) Los Angeles, California, U.S.
- Genre: Jazz
- Instrument: Drums

Roy Lee Porter (July 30, 1923 – January 24, 1998) was an American jazz drummer.

== Early life ==
Born in Walsenburg, Colorado, Porter moved to Colorado Springs when he was eight and began playing drums in rhythm and blues bands while a teenager. He attended Wiley College in Texas briefly, where trumpeter Kenny Dorham was a fellow student. He joined Milt Larkin's band in 1943, replacing Joe Marshall.

== Career ==
After military service, Porter settled in Los Angeles, and his services were soon in demand by some of the pioneers of bebop. He worked with Teddy Bunn and Howard McGhee, making his first recordings with the latter. In 1946, he backed Charlie Parker on such Dial classics as "A Night In Tunisia", "Yardbird Suite", "Ornithology" and the unfortunate recording of "Lover Man".

Porter played on Los Angeles' Central Avenue with such bebop players as Dexter Gordon, Wardell Gray and Teddy Edwards, and in San Francisco with Hampton Hawes and Sonny Criss. He organized and went on the road with a big band in 1949 that included Art Farmer, Jimmy Knepper and Eric Dolphy.

During the 1950s, Porter was inactive as a jazz musician due to drug problems which landed him in prison. When he was released in the 1970s, he started playing funk and made several recordings under the name “The Roy Porter Sound Machine”. In the 1990s, they were re-issued and producers started sampling his tracks, which made him a fair amount of money a few years before he died.
