= Jacques Monod (disambiguation) =

Jacques Monod (1910–1976) is a French biochemist and Nobel Prize laureate.

Jacques Monod may also refer to:

- Jacques Monod (actor) (1918–1985), French actor
- Jacques-Louis Monod, American composer
