= Spotlite Records =

British jazz record company and label

Spotlite Records is a British jazz record company and label. It was founded in 1968 by British producer Tony Williams, originally as an outlet for Charlie Parker's Dial recordings. It has reissued other Dial masters, and undertaken new recordings featuring artists such as, Don Rendell, Al Haig, John C. Williams, and Peter King.

The origins of Spotlite Records grew out of a discography of Charlie Parker that Tony Williams produced in the early 1960s. This led to correspondence with Ross Russell, the proprietor of Dial Records, who subsequently gave Williams the rights to reproduce the Dial sessions under the Spotlite label. Friendship with Ross Russell, with encouragement from Williams resulted in Russell completing the writing and publication of his biography of Charlie Parker, Bird Lives.
