= Joel Eric Suben =

American conductor

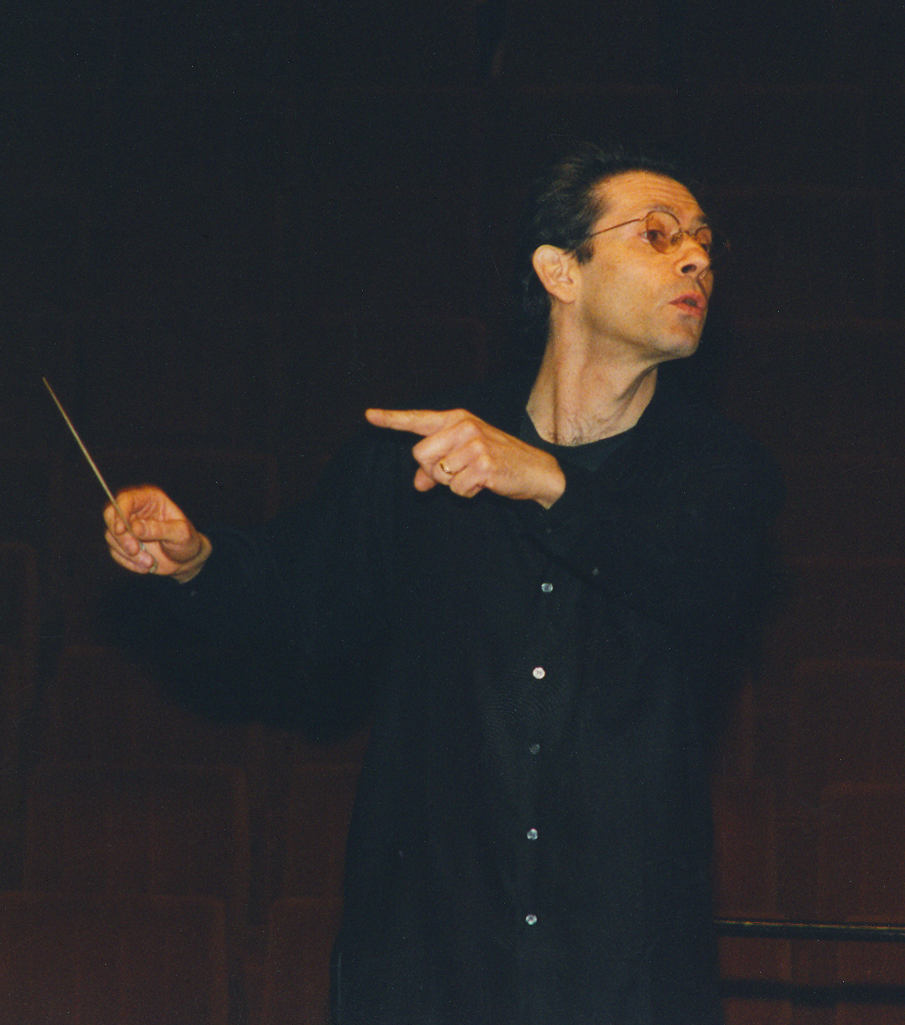
Joel Eric Suben in 1998.

Joel Eric Suben (May 16, 1946 – August 15, 2023) was an American composer and conductor known primarily for his recordings of music by contemporary American and European composers.

== Biography ==
=== Early years ===
Born in the Bronx, Suben was the second of three sons in a middle-class Jewish family of Russian origin. He grew up in the small city of Cortland in Central New York. After showing signs of early musical talent, Suben began studying the trumpet and violin at age 8. He played in school bands and orchestras and sang in choirs throughout his childhood.

At age 10, Suben began transcribing music from phonograph records. By age 13 he was creating arrangements for local dance bands. His music teachers encouraged him to study a number of instruments in the expectation that he would become a music teacher. During summers he undertook formal lessons in percussion (snare drum technique), clarinet, and string bass. Although he'd led dance bands as a teenager, his interests gravitated to classical music. At age 14 he auditioned for Syracuse Symphony Orchestra conductor Karl Kritz and was invited to play violin in the symphony's newly formed youth orchestra.

=== Advanced studies ===
During Suben's final year of high school he auditioned for Louis Krasner at Syracuse University but declined a scholarship offer from the university in favor of a scholarship to study trumpet at the Eastman School of Music. In deference to his father's wishes, Suben enrolled in a liberal arts degree program at the nearby University of Rochester and traveled to the Eastman campus for trumpet lessons and theory classes. In his second year, Suben transferred his enrollment entirely to Eastman and concentrated largely on composition and violin studies. He was allowed to declare a major in composition only after he won first prize in 1967 in a nationwide competition for composers. The winning composition, a setting of Psalm 100 for tenor voice and organ, was published by Bellwin-Mills (who bought out H.W. Gray, the co-sponsors, along with the American Guild of Organists, of the competition). Suben left Eastman in 1969 with a B.Mus. degree cum laude.

As a full fellowship doctoral student (1969–1972) at Brandeis University near Boston, Suben studied composition and theory under Seymour Shifrin, Arthur Berger, Harold Shapero, and Martin Boykan, and studied musical paleontology with Leo Treitler. Increasingly in demand as a conductor of other composers’ works, Suben took a one-year position as orchestra conductor at Northeastern University and held simultaneous music directorships at a local church and synagogue. In March 1973 he led what is believed to be the Boston premiere of Darius Milhaud’s Service Sacré with an enlarged chorus and members of the orchestra of the Opera Company of Boston.

In spring 1973 Suben resigned from all of his directorships, moved to New York City, and began four years of intensive private conducting study with Jacques-Louis Monod. During this time Suben ceased all composing activity and made an intensive study of the standard orchestral and opera repertoire. In 1975 he was admitted to Otmar Suitner’s conductors’ class at the Mozarteum Sommerakademie in Salzburg; at the end of his second summer in Salzburg (1976) he was a finalist in the Hans Haring International Competition for Conductors, administered annually by the music division of the Austrian Radio. During the run-up to the final round, the jury summoned Suben back to the podium three times to rehearse the orchestra in Anton Webern’s Six Pieces for Orchestra, op. 6.

In August 1976 Witold Rowicki, visiting professor at the Vienna Music Academy (now called die Universität für Musik und darstellende Kunst Wien), admitted Suben into his conductors’ master class and subsequently invited him to come to Warsaw, where Rowicki was artistic director of the National Philharmonic (Filharmonia Narodowa). Suben won a Fulbright Fellowship and, following a month-long composition residency at the MacDowell Colony, arrived in Warsaw only to discover that Rowicki had retired from the directorship of FN. Suben lived from September 1977 until December 1978 in Katowice, where he was officially a composition student (in fact, the first American student) of Henryk Mikołaj Górecki in that city's music academy (now called Akademia Muzyczna im. Karola Szymanowskiego). During his tenure in Katowice, Suben organized a series of orchestral performances of contemporary American music; he also conducted the Rybnik Philharmonic Orchestra and the Ogniwo Choir. Suben's final activity as a student came in 1984 when he was admitted to the master class for conductors given by Sergiu Celibidache at the Curtis Institute of Music.

=== Academic career ===
Returning to New York in 1979, Suben resumed teaching part-time at Fordham University and Baruch College (he had taught courses at both institutions from 1974 to 1977). He also completed his doctoral dissertation during this time, one part being the full score to a large composition (his Concerto for Piano and Orchestra [1978]), the other a theoretical paper ("Debussy and Octatonic Pitch Structure"). Armed with a Ph.D. from Brandeis, he took a professorship at the University of Richmond (VA), where in the fall of 1980 he organized an orchestral concert honoring American hostages in Iran. This concert attracted considerable media attention.

In 1983 he joined the music faculty of the College of William & Mary, where he remained until 1992 as Director of Orchestras. During this time Suben taught a number of private conducting and composition students. While at W&M, Suben formed a chamber orchestra and created an annual series of the six Brandenburg Concerti of J.S. Bach in the historic Bruton Parish Chapel. He also inaugurated a contemporary music ensemble and an opera workshop at W&M and in November 1989 gave the world premiere of American composer Philip James’s cantata To Cecilia with the William & Mary Orchestra and Chorus.

In 1992 Suben resigned from his position at William & Mary, returned to live permanently in New York, and formed Save The Music, inc. as a tax-exempt nonprofit corporation. Apart from a three-year tenure as conductor of the Wellesley Philharmonic (the student orchestra at Wellesley College) during the mid-1990s, Suben held no further permanent academic positions.

== Compositions ==
=== Stylistic evolution ===
Suben's earliest serious compositions (e.g. Sonata da Camera [1966] for four violins), written while he was still in his teens, reflected a conservative aesthetic and an adherence to the trappings of tonality, prevalent characteristics of new works being composed then at the Eastman School. In his early and mid twenties, Suben's work acquired a chromatic overlay that reflected the preoccupations of many of his peers and teachers with 12-tone procedures (e.g. Birthday Fragment [1972] for chorus and piano). His works from 1977 onward (following the three-year composing hiatus) are fully dodecaphonic (e.g. Concert Piece for Clarinet and Wind-Band [1977]). After 1978 his work began to show some influences of Witold Lutosławski and Witold Szalonek, the leading Polish composers of highly coloristic, voluptuous chromatic music of the time (e.g. Träume auf Dichterhöhe [1978] for horn and string orchestra), but notably no trace of any influence by his teacher Górecki. By the late 1980s Suben had begun to write functionally tonal music (e.g. Symphony in Old Style [1987], Winter Love [1988], Song Book [1989] for treble voices a cappella, Concerto Classico [1991] for flute and orchestra) while he continued to turn out highly detailed 12-tone works (e.g. Suite of Dances [1987] for 2 guitars, Seven Days [1992] for mezzo-soprano and piano).

=== Recent works ===
After 1993, Suben's compositional output diminished in direct proportion to his growing activity in making recordings. Between 1994 and 2010 his compositional output consisted entirely of: television commercial music (1994) for Granta Magazine (aired on PBS networks), Breve Sogno (1994) for large orchestra (his last completed 12-tone work), Fantasy-Variations on a Theme of Maria Theresia von Paradis (1999) for violin and orchestra, Seven (2004) for chorus a cappella, Ciacconetta (2008) for viola and orchestra, and Three Images (2010) for cello and orchestra.

==== Awards, prizes, commissions ====
- First Prize (1967) in Composition Competition of American Guild of Organists/H.W. Gray Publishers [Make a Joyful Noise for tenor voice and organ, publ. Bellwin Mills 1971]
- First Prize (1967) in Sacred Song Composition contest of Eastman School of Music [Behold, How Good and Pleasant for tenor and organ, publ. ACE 1980]
- Virginia Music Teachers Association First Prize and Commission (1981) [Sonatina for Piano, ACA]
- First Prize (1982) in Music Teachers National Association National Composers Competition [Sonatina for Piano]
- Commission (1981) from Congregation Beth Ahaba [Ha-Azinu] for tenor solo, speaking chorus, and string quartet]
- Commission (1982) from the Roxbury (NY) Chamber Players [The Birth of Euphrosyne for flute, clarinet, violin, cello]
- First Prize (1986) in Washington Square Contemporary Music Series nationwide competition for composers [Idyls for 2 pianos]
- First Prize (1987) in Bucks County (PA) Symphony Composition Competition [Academic Overture]
- Commission (1989) from guitarist William Anderson [Where All the Waters Meet]
- Commission (1999) from Verna Fine to orchestrate Irving Fine’s Second Alice Suite, originally written for chorus and piano, for chorus and orchestra; publ. Boosey & Hawkes.
- AEVentures Foundation grant (2008) to record his own orchestral works.

==== Publishers ====
Suben's compositions are published by American Composers Alliance, Boosey & Hawkes (arrangement of work by Irving Fine), Bourne Company Music Publishing, E.F. Kalmus Co., Schott Music International/European American Music, and Warner/Belwin.

== Conducting activity ==
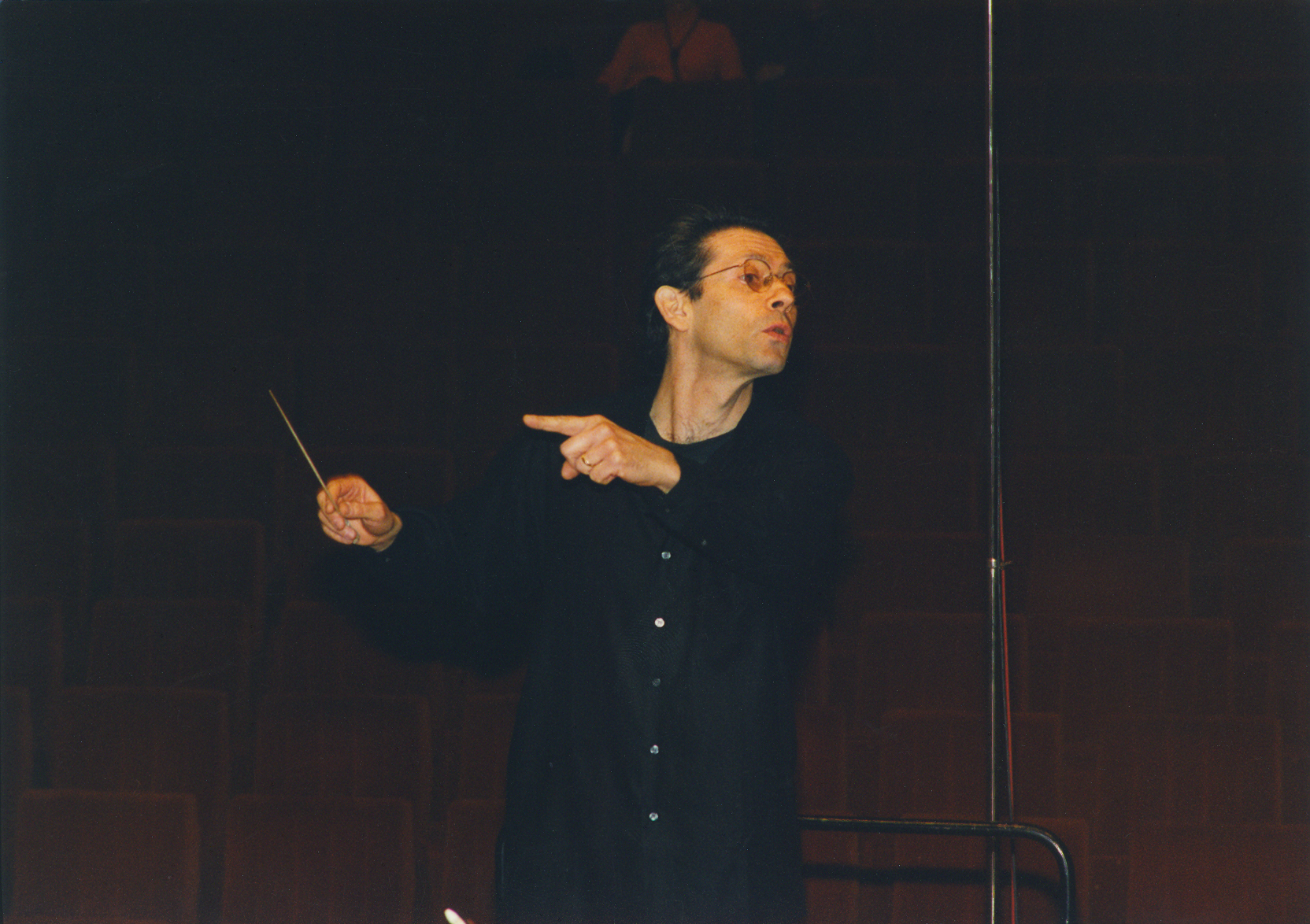
Suben conducting a rehearsal with the Slovak Radio Symphony Orchestra in Bratislava on March 12, 1998.

=== Professional orchestral positions ===
- Music director and permanent conductor, Peninsula Symphony of Virginia (Newport News) 1982–1987 (orchestra declared bankruptcy April 1987).
- Music director and conductor, Center Orchestra (Jewish Community Center, Margate NJ) 1986–1988 (orchestra disbanded April 1988).

=== Important guest conducting activity ===
- American Symphony Orchestra (New York) 1977
- Silesian State Philharmonic (Filharmonia Śląska)(Katowice, Poland) 1986, 1994
- Filharmonia Częstochowska (Częstochowa, Poland) 1992, 1994
- Filharmonia Białostocka (Białystok, Poland) 1992
- Polish Radio National Symphony Orchestra (NOSPR) more than 10 times since 1993
- Janáček Philharmonic Orchestra (Janáčková Filharmonie) (Ostrava, Czech) 1994, 1996
- Slovak Radio Symphony Orchestra (SOSR)(Bratislava) more than 10 times from 1995 to 2002
- North Czech Philharmonic Orchestra (Severočeská Filharmonie Teplice) 1996
- Warsaw Philharmonic Orchestra (Filharmonia Narodowa) 1998 at Warsaw Autumn Festival
- Filharmonia Koszalińska (Koszalin, Poland) 2002
- Moravian Philharmonic Orchestra (Moravská Filharmonie Olomouc)(Czech) more than 10 times since 2002
- Rzeszów Philharmonic Orchestra (Orkiestra Filharmonia Rzeszowska)(Poland) 2005 (Mahler Symph. no. 4)

=== Recording activity ===
As of 2010 Suben appeared as conductor on more than 50 commercially released recordings, all but one of which he made after founding Save The Music, Inc. in 1992. Among the composers whose works Suben recorded are Pulitzer Prize winners Leslie Bassett and Roger Sessions; Beth Anderson; F. diArta Angeli; Mary Jeanne Van Appledorn; Elizabeth Austin; Ross Bauer; Jon Bauman; Joseph Bertolozzi; Larry Thomas Bell; Charles R. Berry; Hayes Biggs; Allan Blank; Peter Blauvelt; Harold Blumenfeld; Allen Brings; Eleanor Cory; Richard Brooks; Michael Dellaira; Emma Lou Diemer; Brian Fennelly; Jerzy Fitelberg; Vittorio Furgeri; Steve Heitzeg; Katherine Hoover; Stefania de Kenessey; David Kowalski; Leo Kraft; Philip Lasser; John Melby; Karol Rathaus; Frank Retzel; Marga Richter; Judith Shatin; Max Schubel; Edward Sielicki; William Grant Still; Kile Smith; Walter Ross; A. L. Scarmolin; Marilyn Shrude; John Sichel; Elias Tanenbaum; Roberto Toscano; Joelle Wallach; Raymond Wojcik; Rolf Yttrehus; Mark Zuckerman.

==== Notable performances and recordings ====
- April 1975: first appearance in Weill Hall (then called Carnegie Recital Hall), leading the premiere of Mar-ri-ia-a, a chamber opera by Joseph Olive.
- May 1977: first in-school performances with the American Symphony Orchestra (ASO) in New York.
- March 1984: world premiere performances with Peninsula Symphony of Virginia of Landscapes with Figure by Edgar Warren Williams Jr.
- April 1986: subscription concerts and in-school programs for school children with Filharmonia Śląska; Suben was the first American citizen to lead that orchestra since Fritz Mahler did so in the 1950s; Suben included the world premiere of Refraction by Stephen Dembski, who composed the work for that occasion.
- December 1995: recording of Roger Sessions Piano Concerto with Barry Salwen and the Polish Radio National Symphony (NOSPR) for the Roger Sessions Society of America; recording never released commercially.
- March 1998: archival recordings for Polish Radio with NOSPR, works by Karol Rathaus and Edward Sielicki.
- September 1998: live performance at Warsaw Autumn Festival and commercial recordings with Warsaw Philharmonic Orchestra (FN), including world premiere of Columbus by Elias Tanenbaum.
- April 2001: live performance and commercial recording of Italian operas La Serenata Interrotta and Battaglie Perdute of A. L. Scarmolin with international soloists, the Slovak Radio Symphony Orchestra and Bratislava Conservatory Chorus; sponsored by the A.L. Scarmolin Trust and the American Embassy in Bratislava.
- June 2002: more archival recordings with NOSPR for Polish Radio, works by K. Rathaus and Jerzy Fitelberg (frequently broadcast in radio transmissions in Poland, UK, Netherlands, France).
- August 2009: studio recording of the Haydn Cello Concerti with Robert deMaine and the Moravian Philharmonic Orchestra (MFO); pending commercial release in 2011.

==== Symphony for Kids® ====
In March 2009 Suben inaugurated an in-school live performance experience for school-age audiences featuring performances of major works of orchestral repertoire with a handpicked orchestra of New York City freelance musicians.

==== Discography ====
Of Suben's more than 50 commercially released recordings, the following are among the most significant:

- New Music for Orchestra—Leslie Bassett and other American composers. Opus One CD #156 (1995)
- Larry Thomas Bell: The Sentimental Music and other orchestral works. North/South CD # NS1031 (2004).
- Harold Blumenfeld: Vers Sataniques. Albany Records Troy CD 1034 (nominated for ASCAP Rudolf Nissim Recording Prize 2008)
- Michael Dellaira: Five. Albany Records Troy CD 487
- The Orchestra According to the Seven (works of Stefania de Kenessey, M. Dellaira, John Sichel and others. Opus One CD #170 (1996)
- In Wildness is the Preservation of the World (works of Brian Fennelly). New World Records CD 80448-2 (1994)
- Chrysalis (works of B. Fennelly). Albany Records Troy CD 491 (2002)
- Music of Brian Fennelly. CRI CD 759 (1997)
- Orchestral Excursions (works of Howard Harris and Marga Richter). Leonarda CD LE351 (2000)
- Night Skies—Orchestral Music of Katherine Hoover. Parnassus CD PACD 96019 (1998)
- Leo Kraft: Music for Symphony Orchestra. Centaur CD CRC 2620 (2005)
- John Melby: "Concerti". Albany Records Troy CD 1124 (2009)
- Karol Rathaus: Orchestral Works. Centaur CD CRC 2402 (1998)
- Anthony Louis Scarmolin: Orchestral Works. Naxos 8.559012 / Marco Polo 8.225031 (1998)
- Piping the Earth—Orchestral Music of Judith Shatin. Capstone CPS 8727 (2003)
- Modern Classics, Vol. VI (works of David Kowalski, Elias Tanenbaum, Rolv Yttrehus). MMC #2104 (2001)
- Akin to Fire—The Orchestral Music of Raymond Wojcik. Albany Troy 898 (2006)
- Joelle Wallach—Shadow: Sighs, and Songs of Longing. Capstone CPS 8689 (2001)
- The Music of Rolv Yttrehus. CRI CD #843 (2000)
- Mark Zuckerman: New Music for Strings. MSR Classics, MS 1223 (2002)

==== Public persona ====
In the role of a public music personality during much of his career, Suben displayed a tendency to engage in polemics. After reading a review of a performance of one of his earliest acknowledged (and therefore arguably listener-friendly) compositions, Suben wrote a letter to the editor protesting the critic's fixation on the fact that the piece under review was the work of a student. In a newspaper interview about the inauguration of a new chamber music series that he co-founded, Suben evidently used a term (“…take-no-prisoners programming”) that the arts page editor exploited in boldface large type.
