= Wardell Gray Memorial =

- Wardell Gray Memorial, Volume One

Compilation album by Wardell Gray
- Released: 1955
- Genre: Bebop
- Labels: Prestige; PRLP 7008 (Volume One); PRLP 7009 (Volume Two)

PRLP 7009
- Wardell Gray Memorial, Volume Two

Wardell Gray Memorial, Volume One and Wardell Gray Memorial, Volume Two are a pair of separate but related compilation albums by jazz saxophonist Wardell Gray released by Prestige Records in 1955.

== Background ==
Wardell was born in Oklahoma City, February 13, 1921. In 1935 he transferred to Cass Technical High School, where he began "playing with the local bands of Jimmy Rachel and Benny Carew". From 1943 to 1945, he doubled on tenor saxophone and clarinet for Earl Hines. After a "short spell" with Billy Eckstine, he joined Benny Carter's band in 1946, with whom he "went out to the West Coast and decided to remain for a while."

In 1948, Wardell moved to New York and started playing with Benny Goodman's Sextet and his big band. During that time, he worked with Tadd Dameron, Count Basie, and Sonny Stitt, which, according to Art Farmer, lead to a significant change in style he kept from Hines' days.

In 1950, "he returned to Detroit and spent several months there with his own quartet", after which he returned to playing with Count Basie, with whom he stayed before settling in California at the end of 1951.

== Critical reception ==
Professional ratings
Review scores
Source	Rating
DownBeat	(Volume One)
The Penguin Guide to Jazz Recordings	(Volume One)
The Penguin Guide to Jazz Recordings	(Volume Two)
AllMusic	(Volume One)
AllMusic	(Volume Two)

In a contemporaneous review for DownBeat, Nat Hentoff awarded the album four-out-five stars, saying:

This is the first volume of a well-prepared and well-annotated Wardell Gray Memorial. Included are four 1949 dates with Al Haig, Tommy Potter, Roy Haynes; four 1950 Detroit tracks with Phil Hill, Johnny Richardson, Art Mardigan; four 1953 sides made by Teddy Charles on the west coast with Frank Morgan, Sonny Clark, Dick Nivison, and Lawrence Marable. The firstrate notes are by Ira Gitler. There are full personnel and recording dates. Rudy Van Gelder has remastered the originals. Gray, at the very beginning greatly influenced by Lester Young, was later further molded by Bird. He had a hard, full tone, swung with ease, and his conception was intelligent and always musical. He had freshening feeling for ballads, and had unflagging strength on up-tempos. He was not one of the handful of great, influencing jazzmen but he was one of the big leaguers beyond any doubt, and these are sides worth remembering.

Burt Korall, writing in November, 1955 for Metronome, said:

In Memoriam

Drive is an essential characteristic of vital jazz creation, a life force that enables music to rise out of mediocrity into a startling new light … ‘that thing’ which gives pulsation, meaning and desire to amorphous musical material.

As with every other phenomena, drive is a two-sided coin. It can, in appropriate measure, compel a musician to come out of himself and produce ideas that have laid dormant, producing improvisation of great interest. Taken in its more advanced stages, drive engenders a compulsion for creation and individuality that even the most talented cannot attain with any degree of consistency. In any case, frustration is the portion allotted to the artist reaching beyond his sphere for the constant aura of early morning newness which is a rarity even with genius.

Bix and Bird were lost because of their demanding urge to climb a mountain with no foreseeable summit. These were men of genius. These were the leaders. If frustration assumed grand proportions for them, it is certainly of a more vigorous sort for men of lesser resource, who, though formidable and individual in their own right, never get out from under the shadows created by those they idolize. This could very easily have been the case in one recent, unfortunate death in jazz… that of tenorist Wardell Gray.

For Wardell, as for most other modern soloists, Lester Young and Charlie Parker (in that order) have been sources of inspiration and emulation. Early in Gray’s career, his admiration for Lester’s approach showed up in his own playing. As tenor soloist with the Earl Hines band (1943-5) he made his position clear for all who would listen. In 1945, upon joining Billy Eckstine’s band, contact was made with a select group of Bird followers. This band was monumental as a breeding ground for some of our most prominent modernists, and thus the second impact upon this promising musician.

It was on the West Coast, however, that Gray assumed nation-wide prominence on tenor. Through a series of momentous Gene Norman concerts (with Dexter Gordon), that caused much talk among musicians and fans alike, and a set of recordings with his second idol, Charlie Parker (Cheers, Stupendous, Relaxin’ At Camarillo, Carving The Bird, all on Dial Records), he was established as a tenor sound deserving of careful attention. During this period, Gray was still playing in the Prezian texture. (Vintage 1947)

Although his progression up the ladder reputation-wise allowed him to come to New York to play with the best (BG, Basie, Tadd Dameron, Fats Navarro, Allen Eager, etc.), his style had by now assumed a feeling of conflict, and his playing oscillated between Prez and Bird. (Vintage 1948)

Though Wardell continued to play with the ever-present flexibility and fire to the end of his life, he never quite fulfilled the possibilities that could have been less confining, if his approach to stylization had been more definitive and direct and not split down the middle. This, which the omnipresence of Bird’s shadow did so much to prevent.

Wardell Gray’s last stop was in Las Vegas, and as with many people, that is where his luck ran out. For Wardell, the musician, the frustration and pressures were alleviated.

Prestige Records is putting together two albums of some of this musician’s finest work as a living memorial. It should be vital if just for one reason: Here was a man who always tried to be himself, and with more time might have made it.

The April 28, 1956 edition of Billboard called Volume Two, "A convenient collection of some of the better sides by the late tenor man, available up until now only on scattered LP’s and EP’s. The material in this album was originally recorded in 1950 and 1951. The latter recording date was memorable for the early appearance of trumpet man Art Farmer. His blowing in Farmer’s Market proved to be a springboard to fame. In the same session, Gray cut Jackie, Sweet and Lovely and Lover Man, all available here. The earlier sessions had Sonny Criss and Clark Terry, among others, in attendance, with Dexter Gordon sitting in on Move."

== Track listing ==
=== Wardell Gray Memorial, Volume One ===
==== Original release ====
Side A
No.	Title	Date recorded	Length
1.	"Twisted"	November 11, 1949
2.	"Easy Living"	November 11, 1949
3.	"Southside"	November 11, 1949
4.	"Sweet Lorraine"	November 11, 1949
5.	"Blue Gray"	April 25, 1950
6.	"Grayhound"	April 25, 1950

Side B
No.	Title	Date recorded	Length
1.	"So Long Broadway"	February 20, 1953
2.	"Paul's Cause"	February 20, 1953
3.	"The Man I Love"	February 20, 1953
4.	"Lavonne"	February 20, 1953
5.	"A Sinner Kissed an Angel"	April 25, 1950
6.	"Treadin'"	April 25, 1950

==== 1992 Original Jazz Classics CD reissue ====
No.	Title	Date recorded	Length
1.	"Twisted" (Master Number JRC46)	November 11, 1949	3:02
2.	"Twisted" (JRC46C)	November 11, 1949	2:42
3.	"Twisted" (alternate; JRC46A)	November 11, 1949	3:26
4.	"Twisted" (alternate; JRC46D)	November 11, 1949	3:12
5.	"Easy Living" (JRC48B)	November 11, 1949	4:21
6.	"Easy Living" (alternate; JRC48)	November 11, 1949	4:35
7.	"Southside" (JRC47E)	November 11, 1949	3:18
8.	"Southside" (alternate; JRC47D)	November 11, 1949	2:50
9.	"Southside" (JRC47A)	November 11, 1949	2:39
10.	"Southside" (JRC47B)	November 11, 1949	3:08
11.	"Southside" (JRC47C)	November 11, 1949	3:13
12.	"Southside" (JRC47F)	November 11, 1949	2:45
13.	"Southside" (JRC47G)	November 11, 1949	2:10
14.	"Sweet Lorraine" (JRC49A)	November 11, 1949	4:02
15.	"So Long Broadway" (JRC469)	February 20, 1953	3:10
16.	"Paul's Cause" (JRC470)	February 20, 1953	2:55
17.	"The Man I Love" (JRC467)	February 20, 1953	3:07
18.	"Lavonne" (JRC468)	February 20, 1953	2:55

- Tracks 1 to 14 recorded New York, November 11, 1949
- Tracks 15 to 18 recorded Los Angeles, February 20, 1953
- From liner notes: "In order to accommodate the ten alternate tracks now included in Volume 1 and to preserve the approximately equal lengths of the two discs, four tracks ("Grayhound", "Blue Gray", "Treadin'" and "A Sinner Kissed by an Angel") that were originally part of Volume 1 now appear on Volume 2."

=== Wardell Gray Memorial, Volume Two ===
==== Original release ====
Side A
No.	Title	Date recorded	Length
1.	"April Skies"	January 21, 1952
2.	"Bright Boy"	January 21, 1952
3.	"Jackie"	January 21, 1952
4.	"Farmers Market"	January 21, 1952
5.	"Sweet and Lovely"	January 21, 1952
6.	"Lover Man"	January 21, 1952

Side B
No.	Title	Date recorded	Length
1.	"Scrapple from the Apple"	August 27, 1950
2.	"Move"	August 27, 1950

==== 1992 Original Jazz Classics CD reissue ====
No.	Title	Date recorded	Length
1.	"Blue Gray" (Master number JRC80B)	April 25, 1950	2:45
2.	"Blue Gray" (JRC80A)	April 25, 1950	2:48
3.	"Blue Gray" (JRC80C)	April 25, 1950	2:42
4.	"Grayhound" (JRC81B)	April 25, 1950	3:04
5.	"Grayhound" (JRC81A)	April 25, 1950	2:38
6.	"Grayhound" (JRC81C)	April 25, 1950	1:09
7.	"A Sinner Kissed an Angel" (JRC79A)	April 25, 1950	3:09
8.	"Treadin'" (JRC82C)	April 25, 1950	3:47
9.	"Treadin'" (JRC82A)	April 25, 1950	3:30
10.	"Treadin'" (JRC82B)	April 25, 1950	3:14
11.	"April Skies"	January 21, 1952	3:03
12.	"Bright Boy"	January 21, 1952	2:46
13.	"Jackie"	January 21, 1952	2:32
14.	"Farmer's Market"	January 21, 1952	2:48
15.	"Sweet and Lovely"	January 21, 1952	3:16
16.	"Lover Man"	January 21, 1952	2:21
17.	"Move"	August 27, 1950	9:46
18.	"Scrapple from the Apple"	August 27, 1950	9:02

- tracks 1–10 recorded in Detroit, April 25, 1950
- tracks 17–18 recorded live at the Hula Hut Club in Los Angeles, August 27, 1950.
- tracks 11–16 recorded in Los Angeles, January 21, 1952.

== Personnel ==
=== Musicians ===
==== November 11, 1949 ====
- Wardell Gray – tenor saxophone
- Al Haig – piano
- Tommy Potter – bass
- Roy Haynes – drums
  - recorded in New York

==== April 25, 1950 ====
- Wardell Gray – tenor saxophone
- Hampton Hawes – piano
- John Richardson – bass
- Art Mardigan – drums
  - recorded in Detroit

==== August 27, 1950 ====
- Wardell Gray – tenor saxophone
- Dexter Gordon – tenor saxophone ("Move" only)
- Sonny Criss – alto saxophone
- Clark Terry – trumpet
- Jimmy Bunn – piano
- Billy Hadnott – bass
- Chuck Thompson – drums
  - recorded live at the Hula Hut Club in Los Angeles

==== January 21, 1952 ====
- Wardell Gray – tenor saxophone
- Art Farmer – trumpet (except "Sweet and Lovely")
- Hampton Hawes – piano
- Harper Cosby – bass
- Larry Marable – drums
- Robert Collier – congas (except "Sweet and Lovely" and "Lover Man")
  - recorded in Los Angeles

==== February 20, 1953: Teddy Charles' West Coasters ====
- Frank Morgan – alto saxophone
- Wardell Gray – tenor saxophone
- Teddy Charles – vibraphone
- Sonny Clark – piano
- Dick Niveson – bass
  - credited as Dick Nivison
- Larance Marable – drums
  - recorded in Los Angeles

=== Technical personnel ===
- Ira Gitler – liner notes
- Ray Avery – photography
- Joe Tarantino (1992) – digital remastering engineer
