= Lover Man (Oh, Where Can You Be?) =

1945 single by Billie Holiday

Single by Billie Holiday
- B-side: "That Ole Devil Called Love"
- Released: 1945
- Recorded: October 4, 1944, and November 8, 1944
- Genre: Jazz; pop
- Label: Decca
- Songwriters: Jimmy Davis, Roger ("Ram") Ramirez, and James Sherman

Billie Holiday singles chronology
"Trav'lin' Light" (1942)	"Lover Man (Oh, Where Can You Be?)" (1945)	"Don't Explain" (1946)

"Lover Man (Oh, Where Can You Be?)" (often called simply "Lover Man") is a 1941 popular song written by Jimmy Davis, Roger ("Ram") Ramirez, and James Sherman. It is particularly associated with Billie Holiday, for whom it was written, and her version was inducted into the Grammy Hall of Fame in 1989.

Holiday's version reached No. 5 on the R&B chart and No. 16 on pop in 1945. In July 1946, Charlie Parker recorded a rendition of "Lover Man" while he was intoxicated. Dial Records producer Ross Russell had to hold him up to the microphone during the recording. Sonny Stitt played the song many times on alto saxophone in a virtuoso way, in the original key of D flat. Most jazz musicians, nevertheless, play the song in the key of F. Barbra Streisand recorded a version for her album Simply Streisand in 1967, and her version peaked at No. 29 on the Billboard Adult Contemporary chart.

== Cover versions ==
- Sarah Vaughan recorded the song for the Guild label in 1945, with backing by an instrumental ensemble that included trumpeter Dizzy Gillespie and saxophonist Charlie Parker. Other singers that have covered the song have included June Christy, Rosemary Clooney, Chris Connor, Shirley Horn, Lena Horne, Etta James, Patti LaBelle, Julie London, Carmen McRae, Maria Muldaur, Della Reese, Linda Ronstadt, Diana Ross, and the Communards. After dominating the 1992 Billboard Music Awards with four nominations, Whitney Houston sang a medley starting with "Lover Man".
- Charlie Parker recorded an instrumental version of the song himself in 1946 but he was intoxicated with alcohol during the session, and he was angry when he learned his producer, Ross Russell, released the song despite its flaws. Other saxophone jazzmen who have covered the song include Sonny Stitt, Phil Woods, Cannonball Adderley, Don Byas, Art Pepper, Charles McPherson, Grover Washington Jr., Wardell Gray, and an extended duet between Coleman Hawkins and Sonny Rollins. Jazz critic Ted Gioia named a version by alto player Lee Konitz backed by Stan Kenton as the best interpretation, balancing the song's emotional aspects with the intellectual quest of jazz.

== Charts ==
Chart (1945)	Peak position
US Rhythm & Blues Records	5
US Cash Box Top 100	16
Chart (1967)	Peak position
US Billboard Adult Contemporary	29
