= Bill Moody (author) =

American novelist (1941–2018)

- Born: September 27, 1941; Webb City, Missouri, U.S.
- Died: January 14, 2018 (aged 76); Vallejo, California, U.S.
- Occupations: Novelist; jazz musician
- Children: Sarah May
- Writing career
- Genre: Mystery

Bill Moody (September 27, 1941 – January 14, 2018) was an American writer of detective fiction and a professional jazz drummer.

== Biography ==
Moody grew up in Santa Monica, California and attended Boston's Berklee School of Music.

Moody moved to Las Vegas in the mid-70s and stayed 20 years as a professional jazz drummer. He also taught at the University of Nevada.

Moody lived in northern California and taught creative writing at Sonoma State University.

== Writing career ==
In 1994, Moody's first published novel Solo Hand introduces his Evan Horne character, and addresses music royalties and blackmail.

Moody wrote Death of a Tenor Man (1996) while teaching at the University of Nevada in Las Vegas. The subject of this novel is the mysterious death of saxophonist Wardell Gray.

His third Evan Horne mystery The Sound of the Trumpet (1997) involves lost recordings of trumpeter Clifford Brown.

Bird Lives! (1999) centers around the murders of "smooth jazz" artists.

In Looking for Chet Baker (2002) Horne investigates the disappearance of a friend who has been writing a paper on Chet Baker.

Shades of Blue (2008) is not a murder mystery, but instead Horne investigates what might be original compositions of two famous Miles Davis recordings.

In Fade to Blue (2011) Horne teaches an actor how to fake piano playing for a movie, but is drawn in to a murder investigation.

Mood Swings (2014) is a collection of nine stories, each providing a view of the world of jazz through the eyes of nine musicians.

Moody has written two espionage novels: Czechmate: the Spy Who Played Jazz was written in 1986 but not published until 2012, and The Man in Red Square was published in 2013.

Moody wrote his 1993 non-fiction book The Jazz Exiles based on his experiences living and working in Europe for three years.

== Music career ==
Moody has played with many jazz musicians, including Jon Hendricks, Lou Rawls, Maynard Ferguson, Russ Freeman, and Carson Smith.

== Bibliography ==
=== Evan Horne Series ===
Fictional mysteries featuring jazz pianist Evan Horne.

- Solo Hand (1994) ISBN 1871033497
- Death of a Tenor Man (1995) ISBN 0802732690
- The Sound of the Trumpet (1997) ISBN 0802732917
- Bird Lives! (1998) ISBN 0373263503
- Looking for Chet Baker (2002) ISBN 1590585739
- Shades of Blue (2008) ISBN 1590584856
- Fade to Blue (2011) ISBN 1590588940

=== Other novels ===
- Czechmate: The Spy Who Played Jazz (2012) ISBN 1937495302
- The Man in Red Square (2013) ISBN 1937495450

=== Collections ===
Mood Swings (2014) ISBN 9781943402090

=== Nonfiction ===
The Jazz Exiles (1993) ISBN 978-0874172140
