= Jean Antoine Petit-Senn =

Swiss novelist, poet, singer, editor and politician

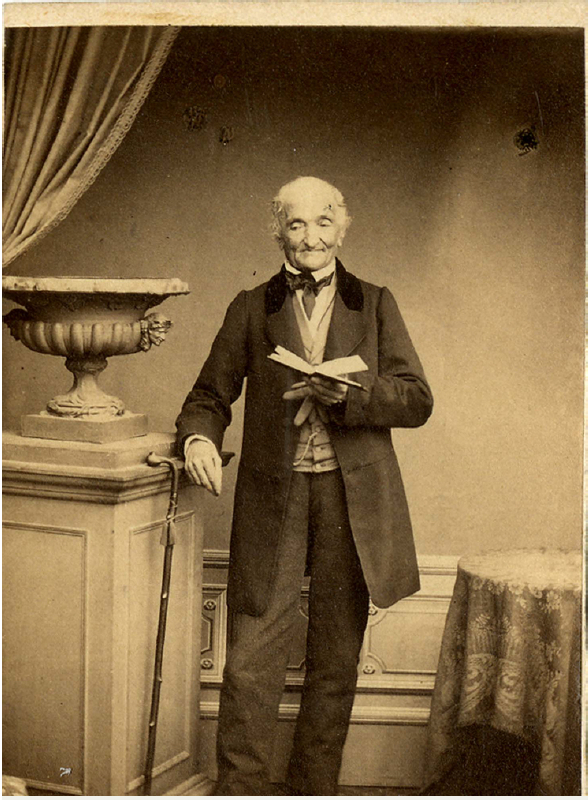
ndated photo by François Vuagnat, from the collection of the Bibliothèque de Genève

Jean Antoine Petit-Senn (Geneva, 6 April 1792 – Chêne-Bourg, 10 March 1870), also known as John Petit-Senn, was a Swiss novelist, poet, singer, editor and politician.

== Life ==
Petit-Senn was born in Geneva, when it was still the Republic of Geneva. Six years later it was occupied by the army of the French First Republic. Petit-Senn studied at the Academy of Geneva and then did an apprenticeship with a commercial company in Lyon.

Following his return to Geneva in 1813, when it was still occupied by the French First Empire, he participated in the cultural life of the city. After Geneva joined the Swiss Confederation in 1814/15, Petit-Senn also engaged in politics, serving as a member of the cantonal parliament from 1829 until 1839.

Petit-Senn is buried at the cemetery of Chêne-Bougeries.

== Legacy ==
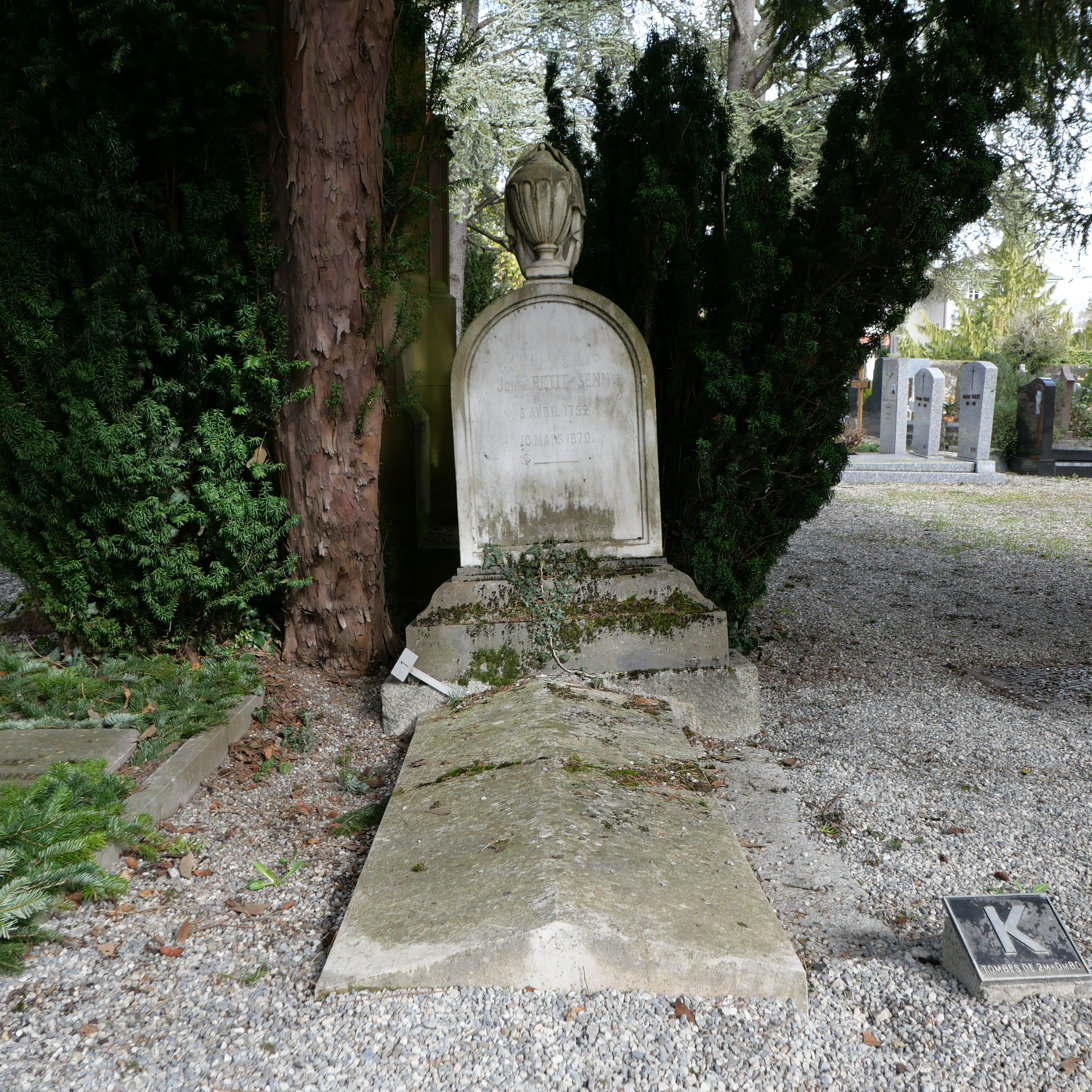
Petit-Senn's grave

According to the 11th edition of the Encyclopædia Britannica he was

a thorough Genevese and a biting satirist, a pensive poet, the Genevese La Bruyère, as he liked to be called, but was not fully appreciated till after his death, when his widely scattered writings were brought together.

Among many quotes attributed to him is this one...

"Not what we have, but what we enjoy, constitutes our abundance."

...which appeared in the American comic strip Mutts on 19 November 2007.
