= Gwendolyn Koldofsky =

Canadian music educator (1906–1998)

Gwendolyn Koldofsky (née Williams; November 1, 1906 – November 12, 1998) was a Canadian collaborative pianist and music educator who became renowned in her field, a Professor Emerita at USC .

Born Gwendolyn Williams in Bowmanville, Ontario, she studied piano with noted Danish piano teacherViggo Kihl in Toronto, with Tobias Matthay in London, as well as with Marguerite Hasselmans in Paris. She studied accompanying in London with Harold Craxton. In 1943, she married Adolph Koldofsky, a noted Canadian violinist born in London, England of Russian-Jewish parents. The pair lived in Toronto until 1944, moving to Vancouver and then to Los Angeles in 1945. Gwendolyn Koldofsky created the first Department of Accompaniment at the music school of the University of Southern California in 1947, where she taught chamber music accompaniment and song literature. She gave master vocal classes for singers and taught accompanying at other North American music schools and universities. in 1951 Koldofsky founded the annual Koldofsky Fellowship in Accompanying scholarship at the USC music school in commemoration of her husband, who had died the same year. Koldofsky was director of vocal accompanying at the Music Academy of the West from 1951 to 1989.

Gwendolyn Koldofsky was the accompanist for Lotte Lehmann, Rose Bampton, Jeanne Dusseau, Herta Glaz, Jan Peerce, Hermann Prey, Martial Singher and famed mezzo-soprano Marilyn Horne, a former student of hers Horne, as well as pianist Martin Katz and soprano Carol Neblett, both students of hers.

Koldofsky retired from teaching in 1990 and moved to Santa Barbara in 1991. She died there at the age of 92.

The annual Marilyn Horne Song Competition has been presented in Koldofsky's memory since 1997. Marilyn Horne recalls her as “Teacher, mentor, accompanist, and my dear friend.”

In 2012, the University of Toronto established the Gwendolyn Williams Koldofsky Prize in Accompanying. The University of Southern California offers the Gwendolyn and Adolph Koldofsky Memorial Scholarship. Recipients include Lorna Eder, So-Mang Jeagal, Dongeui Park, Hye Jung Shin.
