= Jack's Basket Room =

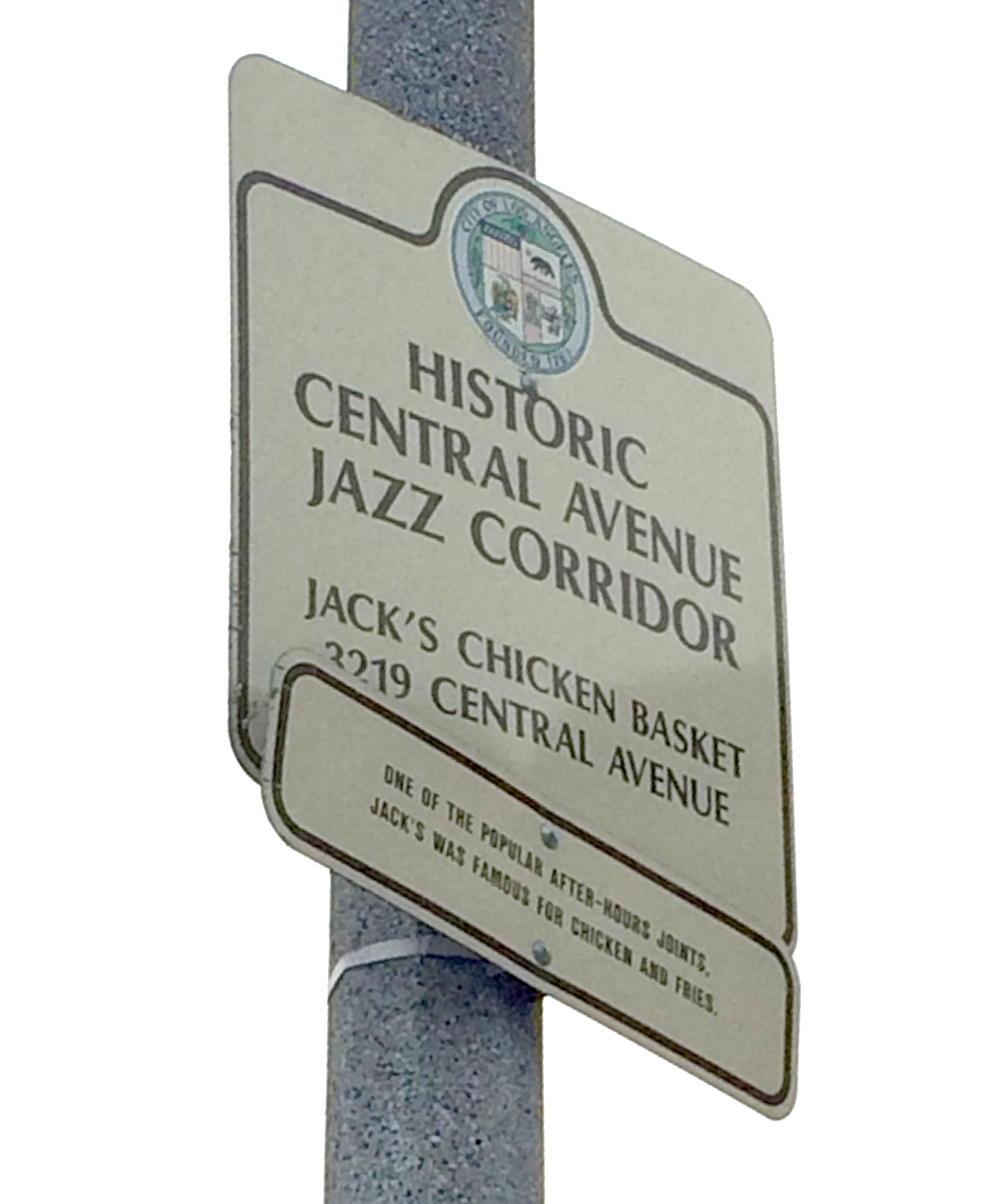
A sign located outside of Jack's Basket Room at 3219 South Central Ave, Los Angeles CA 90011

Jack's Basket Room, also known as Jack's Chicken Basket, The Bird in the Basket, The Basket Room, and Jack's Chicken Shack, was a jazz club operated by former heavyweight boxing champion Jack Johnson and owned by Sam Jack Jackson. It featured after-hours jam sessions that went until dawn in the 1940s–1950s. The name originated from the specialty of the house which was fried chicken and shoestring potatoes served in a rattan basket with mixers and ice. There was no alcohol served at the venue, but it was BYOB or patrons were encouraged to go to a local vendor on the corner to buy half-pints of whisky. Jack's Basket Room also hosted Sunday afternoon matinees and had an annual Christmas dinner for underprivileged children of all races. The dinner was started by owner Jack Johnson and manager Bill Hefflin. They served up to 1,000 turkey dinners with all the trimmings and ice cream for desert. Located in Historic South Central Los Angeles (at 3219 S. Central Ave.), Jack's Basket Room was in the heart of the Jazz Corridor, which was the center of jazz in Los Angeles between the 1920s and 1950s. Among the venues on Central Avenue, Club Alabam was one of the best known.

== History ==
The years of operation for Jack's Basket Room are unclear. According to City of Los Angeles Department of Building and Safety, building owner Sam Jack Jackson applied for the permit in 1944 and sold the building in 1951. The Negro Motorist Green Book listed the venue from 1947 to 1955. "The location was such an ideal spot for impromptu jams that Jack's became the center of the Central Avenue modern jazz scene ... modern music being played on the stand, and the layout of the room gave the proceedings a concert hall aura. In fact, the restaurant must have served at one time as a cabaret or meeting hall, because a large stage, on which sat an old but serviceable upright piano, dominated one end of the room." A typical Friday night in 1947 was "Sportsman's Night" featuring the L.A. Sportsman Scholarship Benefit Club to honor UCLA's basketball and football stars. There were also late Monday night jam sessions with musicians Howard McGhee, Dick Sanford (né Richard Young Sandford; 1896–1981), Sammy Franklin and his Atomics. Joe Lutcher's band and female impersonators entertained crowds with two floor shows between 12:30am and 3:15am. People even stayed for the breakfast dance at 6am.

There were no musicians on the payroll, Wild Bill Moore, who was in charge on hiring the musicians, would keep a rhythm section there. Musicians would show up and start impromptu jams there all night. Bill Sampson broadcast sessions from there every Monday night from KAGH. Many great musicians played there, Charlie "Bird" Parker was one of the regulars. There was a historical event In February 1947, when he got out of Camarillo State Hospital and appeared at Jack's Basket Room. Trumpeter, composer and bandleader Gerald Wilson remembered : "The place was packed. Couldn't even sit down. Bird came to the bandstand, and a roar went up from the crowd like the one for Clinton at the inauguration. It could be heard all up and down Central Avenue." Buddy Collette also recalled the same story in his autobiography – Jazz Generations:

Throughout the years, thinking about Charlie Parker, there were so many marvelous moments and he influenced us in so many different ways. There was a great jam session at Jack's Basket Room after Bird came out of Camarillo State Hospital. He had been quite ill, having problems with drugs and going through other things. It was the night he'd been released. There was an announcement that he was going to come and jam. When he arrived, he looked great, really sharp, as healthy as anybody could, and this was his night. I hadn't ever seen him like that before. There must have been thirty or forty different musicians all wanting to show Parker how they could play. All the tenor and alto players were there – Sonny Criss, Wardell Gray, Dexter Gordon, Gene Phillips, Teddy Edwards, Jay McNeely, and on and on. They all played and Bird just sat there and smiled. It was a long night. Finally, Bird got up there and I don't think he played more than three or four choruses. But he told a complete story, caught all the nuances, tapered off to the end. Nobody played a note after that. Everybody just packed up their horns and went on home, because it was so complete, so right..

— Buddy Collette, Jazz Generations, pp. 108–09

Many businesses have been through the building after the Basket Room. Currently the building that contained Jack's Basket Room stands empty and abandoned. If you look carefully enough you can still see the faded writing on the building with the motto "Chicken aint't nuten but a bird" and the original name "Jack's Basket Room". There is also a small plaque outside the building stating its historical importance.
