= Joelle Wallach =

American composer (born 1946)

Joelle Wallach (born June 29, 1946, in New York) is an American composer. As a girl she lived for five years in Morocco before returning to the United States to attend the Juilliard School's pre-college program, where she studied the violin, piano, singing, theory, and composition. She attended Sarah Lawrence College, where she earned a bachelor's degree in music composition in 1967. She continued with graduate studies at Columbia University (MA 1969), and, as a pupil of John Corigliano, at the Manhattan School of Music (DMA 1984).

As a composer, Wallach is particularly known for her string and vocal works which use a post-Wagnerian tonal idiom and for her orchestral works, which exhibit a wide range of influences such as Hebrew chant and North African dance traditions. Wallach is also known for her symphonic work The Tiger's Tail which won the National Orchestral Association composition contest in 1991 and for her chamber opera The King's Twelve Moons. Her secular oratorio, Toward a Time of Renewal for 200 voices and orchestra was commissioned by the New York Choral Society for their 35th Anniversary Season at Carnegie Hall. The New York Philharmonic's Chamber Ensemble premiered her octet, From the Forest Chimneys, written to celebrate their 10th anniversary, and her ballet, Glancing Below, commissioned by the Carlisle Project, was premiered in Philadelphia during the summer of 1994.

== Sources ==
- Lisa B. Robinson. The New Grove Dictionary of Opera, edited by Stanley Sadie (1992), ISBN 0-333-73432-7 and ISBN 1-56159-228-5
