= Adolph Koldofsky =

London-born violinist

Adolph Koldofsky (13 September 1905 – 8 April 1951) was a London-born violinist, living for most of his career in Canada and later in America. He was an orchestral player and member of chamber music ensembles; he commissioned and gave the premiere of Arnold Schoenberg's Phantasy Op. 47 for violin and piano.

== Life ==
Koldofsky was born in London in 1905, son of Russian-Jewish parents. He moved to Canada in 1910, and later returned to Europe to study violin with Eugène Ysaÿe and Otakar Ševčík; he toured Czechoslovakia as leader of the Ševčík String Quartet.

In Canada he played with the Toronto Symphony Orchestra intermittently from 1923 to 1938. From 1938 to 1942 he was second violin with the Hart House String Quartet, a Toronto quartet founded in 1923.

=== C. P. E. Bach manuscripts ===
From 1934 for several years, Koldofsky endeavoured to authenticate manuscripts of keyboard concertos shown to him, said to be by C. P. E. Bach. He established that all were in the same handwriting, but not the composer's own hand; seven were already known, seven were apparently not known. Five of the unknown concertos were given modern premieres in March and April 1943 in Toronto by the harpsichordist Wanda Landowska, broadcast by the Canadian Broadcasting Corporation. The manuscripts were deposited at the University of California, Berkeley.

In 1943 he married the piano accompanist Gwendolyn Williams. They gave recitals for violin and piano; Koldofsky performed as soloist with orchestras. They moved to Vancouver in 1944, and Koldofsky became concertmaster of the Vancouver Symphony Orchestra.

=== Los Angeles, and late works of Schoenberg ===
The Koldofskys moved to Los Angeles in 1945. He played with the RKO Studio Orchestra, and gave chamber music recitals; he took part in a performance of Arnold Schoenberg's String Trio Op. 45, broadcast by KFWB in May 1949. Koldofsky commissioned a work for violin and piano from Schoenberg; the Phantasy for violin with piano accompaniment Op. 47 was composed in March 1949, and Koldofsky gave its first performance on 13 September of that year, the composer's 75th birthday.

Koldofsky died in Los Angeles in 1951. His wife founded an annual scholarship, the Koldofsky Fellowship in Accompanying, at the University of Southern California. This became the Gwendolyn and Adolph Koldofsky Memorial Scholarship.
