= Wardell Gray =

American jazz saxophonist (1921–1955)

Background information
- Born: February 13, 1921; Oklahoma City, Oklahoma, U.S.
- Origin: Detroit, Michigan, U.S.
- Died: May 25, 1955 (aged 34) Las Vegas, Nevada, U.S.
- Genres: Jazz, swing, bebop
- Occupation: Musician
- Instruments: Tenor saxophone, clarinet
- Years active: 1940–1955
- Formerly of: Earl Hines, Benny Goodman, Count Basie, Dexter Gordon

Wardell Gray (February 13, 1921 – May 25, 1955) was an American jazz tenor saxophonist.

== Biography ==
=== Early years ===
The youngest of four children, Gray was born in Oklahoma City. He spent his early childhood years in Oklahoma before he and his family moved to Detroit, Michigan, in 1929.

In early 1935, Gray began attending Northeastern High School, he was then transferred to Cass Technical High School. He left in 1936, before graduating. Advised by his brother-in-law Junior Warren, Gray as a teenager started learning the clarinet. However, after hearing Lester Young on record with Count Basie, he was inspired to switch to the tenor saxophone.

Gray's first musical job was in Isaac Goodwin's small band, a part-time band that played local dances. When auditioning for another job, he was heard by Dorothy Patton, a young pianist who was forming a band in the Fraternal Club in Flint, Michigan, she later hired him. After a year there, he moved to Jimmy Raschel's band (Raschel had recorded a few sides earlier in the 1930s but did not do so again), and then to the Benny Carew band in Grand Rapids, Michigan. Around this time, he met Jeanne Goings; they had a daughter, Anita, born in January 1941.

=== With the Earl Hines Orchestra ===
Near the Congo Club was the Three Sixes. A young dancer, Jeri Walker, knew Earl Hines, and when the Hines band came through Detroit in late 1943, she persuaded Hines to hire Gray on alto saxophone since there was no tenor saxophone job at the time. This was a break for the 21-year-old, as the Earl Hines Orchestra was not only nationally known but had nurtured the careers of emerging bebop musicians such as Dizzy Gillespie and Charlie Parker. Although most of them had left when Gray joined, playing with the Hines band was a stimulating experience. He married Jeri Walker in Chicago in September 1945.

=== Arrival on the West Coast ===
He left Hines late in 1946, settling in Los Angeles, California; soon after arriving, he recorded the first session under his name. This was a quartet session for Eddie Laguna's Sunset label, and on it Wardell was supported by Dodo Marmarosa on piano. The date produced "Easy Swing" and "The Man I Love".

In Los Angeles, Wardell worked with Benny Carter, blues singer Ivory Joe Hunter, and the small group that supported singer Billy Eckstine on a tour of the West Coast. But the real focus in Los Angeles was in clubs along Central Avenue, which were still thriving after the boom years brought about by the injection of wartime defence spending. Here Wardell played in after-hours sessions in clubs such as Jack's Basket Room, the Down Beat, Lovejoy's, and the Club Alabama. His early success in these sessions led Ross Russell to include him in a studio session he was organizing for his Dial label.

In the Central Avenue clubs Wardell held tenor battles with Dexter Gordon. Gordon recalled: "There'd be a lot of cats on the stand, but by the end of the session, it would wind up with Wardell and myself... His playing was very fluid, very clean.... He had a lot of drive and a profusion of ideas". Their fame began to spread, and Ross Russell managed to get them to simulate one of their battles on "The Chase", which became Wardell's first nationally known recording and has been called "one of the most exciting musical contests in the history of jazz".

The success of "The Chase" was the break Wardell needed, and he became increasingly prominent in public sessions in and around Los Angeles, including a series of jam sessions organized by the disc jockey Gene Norman. There were concerts at the Pasadena Civic Auditorium, the Shrine Auditorium, and other venues.

=== Benny Goodman and Count Basie ===
Outside from time spent with a small band led by Al Killian, Wardell was still working mainly in one-off sessions during 1947. However, at a concert around the turn of that year featuring Benny Goodman, Goodman hired him for a small group that he was setting up as part of his flirtation with bebop. Goodman had been critical of bop playing but, speaking of Wardell to Metronome, he said that "if he's bop, that's great. He's wonderful!"

Goodman's new group included the young Swedish clarinettist Stan Hasselgard and, initially, Teddy Wilson, and it opened at Frank Palumbo's Click Club in Philadelphia in May 1948.

The group was not a financial success and Goodman eventually broke it up, but by now Wardell was established on the East Coast as an up-and-coming musician. For a while in late 1948/early 1949 he worked with the Count Basie Orchestra, while also managing to record with Tadd Dameron and in quartet and quintet sessions with Al Haig. The quartet session included Gray's own composition, "Twisted", which was used as the basis for a best-selling vocalese version by Annie Ross.

Wardell left Basie in 1949 to return to Benny Goodman. However, life in the Goodman band became increasingly uncongenial for him. In addition, his marriage to Jeri was breaking up. Goodman was not an easy employer at the best of times, and this, combined with the constant traveling, made Wardell increasingly unhappy. The result of this were recordings of the band, both studio sessions, and live airshows, featured work by Wardell that is below his own best standards.

On leaving Goodman, Wardell rejoined Count Basie. Basie had bowed to economic pressures and broken up his big band, forming a septet which included Clark Terry and Buddy DeFranco. Wardell was part of the Basie septet during 1950–51. The only drawback to working with Basie (who had by now enlarged his group again to big band size) was the constant traveling, and Wardell eventually decided to leave so that he could enjoy more home life. The decision was entirely understandable, though the Basie rhythm section was ideally suited to Wardell's brand of swing and, from a musical point of view, enthusiasts for his playing may regret his decision. And an unexpected side-effect was that, because work in the Los Angeles area was short (for black musicians, anyway) Wardell still had to travel frequently in search of jobs. Nevertheless, life at home was good, and one of the few interviews that he ever gave (to the British Melody Maker) showed that he was very happy.

In 1950, Gray played a live concert at the San Francisco Veteran's Memorial Hall as a guest with Gerald Wilson's band. Remarkably captured in high fidelity stereo (the only such example in his discography), this recording was released for the first time in 2006. Gray can be heard in fine form during featured solo spots with small combo backup on "Nice Work if You Can Get It" and "Indiana" and also with Wilson's big band on the blues "Hollywood Freeway" where Gray traded choruses with Zoot Sims and Stan Getz.

=== Decline ===
At around this time, his recording sessions started becoming fewer—though a live session with Dexter Gordon, recreating the excitements of Central Avenue, and a studio session with Art Farmer and Hampton Hawes, have fine examples of Gray's playing.

However, there are increasing signs of a lack of engagement around 1951/52, notably in a further live session with Dexter Gordon from February 1952, and it seems that he may have been becoming disillusioned with the music business. That he was still capable of playing superbly is shown by his work on a live jam session at The Haig, but such sessions were by now very sparse, and more typical work from this period was recorded on a session with Teddy Charles.

Around this time, Gray became involved with drugs; friends reported that this was taking its toll. His playing was now less fluent, and a studio session in January 1955, which was to be his last, shows strong but (by his own standards) rather unsubtle playing.

=== Death ===
Gray was still working regularly despite his drug problems, and when Benny Carter was engaged in May 1955 to provide the band at the opening of the Moulin Rouge Hotel, he called on Gray. Gray attended rehearsals but was absent when the club opened on May 25. The next day he was found on a stretch of desert on the outskirts of Las Vegas dead with a broken neck. At the age of 34, the official report concluded he died of a heroin overdose.

Although various sources still describe the circumstances of Gray's death as mysterious, the closing note of a solography on the tribute website wardellgray.org states that "The circumstances are now clear (ref. Han Schulte interviewing Teddy Edwards in the late 80s): Teddy was on the spot, May 1955 in Las Vegas, when WG died in his hotel room after an overdose. His friends, working with the group of Benny Carter in LA, wanted no police trouble, so they put his body in a car and brought it to the desert. By unloading, the body fell on the ground and his neck was broken. That's it."

=== In popular culture ===
James Ellroy's novel The Cold Six Thousand contains a reference to Gray's disappearance and death: according to this, he was murdered by (fictional) racist conspirator Wayne Tedrow, Sr. for having an affair with his wife, Janice.

Bill Moody's book Death of a Tenor Man tells the story of a contemporary investigation of Wardell's death by fictional detective/pianist Evan Horne.

Jack Kerouac explicitly references Wardell in his novel On the Road: "They ate voraciously as Neal, sandwich in hand, stood bowed and jumping before the big phonograph listening to a wild bop record I just bought called 'The Hunt', with Dexter Gordon and Wardell Gray blowing their tops before a screaming audience that gave the record fantastic frenzied volume."

== Discography ==
=== As leader ===
- Tenor Sax Favorites (Prestige PRLP 115, 1951) 10" LP
- Gene Norman Presents... The Chase and the Steeplechase (Decca DL 7025, 1952) 10" LP; with Dexter Gordon
- Jazz Concert with Wardell Gray All Stars (Prestige PRLP 128, 1953) 10" LP
- Los Angeles All Stars (Prestige PRLP 147, 1953) 10" LP
- Wardell Gray Memorial, Volume One (Prestige PRLP 7008, 1955)
- Wardell Gray Memorial, Volume Two (Prestige PRLP 7009, 1955)
- Way Out Wardell (Modern LMP 1204, 1956; Crown CLP 5004, 1957)
- Memorial Album (Prestige PR 7343, 1965) 2-LP
- Central Avenue (Prestige 24062, 1976) 2-LP
- Live in Hollywood (Xanadu 146, 1977)
- Wardell Gray & Dexter Gordon: The Chase And The Steeple Chase [Jazz Heritage Series, Vol. 37] (MCA 1336, 1980) reissue
- Light Gray (Cool & Blue 116, 1994) compilation of Sittin' In With, Apollo, Seeco, and Prestige masters from 1948-1950
- The Chronological Wardell Gray 1946-1950 (Classics, 2002)
- The Wardell Gray Story (Proper, 2003) 4-CD box set
- The Chronological Wardell Gray 1950-1955 (Classics, 2008)

=== As sideman ===
With Count Basie

- The Old Count and the New Count (Epic LG 1021, 1954) 10" LP
- Blues By Basie (Columbia CL 901, 1956)
- One O'Clock Jump (Columbia CL 997, 1957)
- The Octet Sounds (Ocium [Spain] OCM 0002, 2001) compilation

With Louis Bellson

- Just Jazz All-Stars (Capitol H348, 1952) 10" LP
- Skin Deep (Norgran MGN 1046, 1955)

With Tadd Dameron Septet

- The Fabulous Fats Navarro, Vol. 2 (Blue Note BLP 1532, 1957)

With Benny Goodman

- Undercurrent Blues (Capitol Jazz 72438 32086 23, 1995) compilation

With Frank Morgan

- Frank Morgan (Gene Norman Presents/GNP 12, 1955)
