= Dial Records (1946) =

American record label

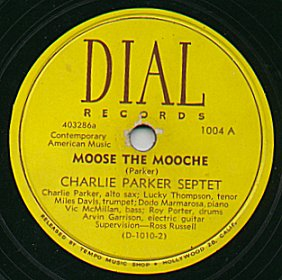
- Dial Record label of a Charlie Parker release
- Founded: 1946
- Founder: Ross Russell
- Defunct: June 3, 1954
- Status: Inactive
- Genre: Jazz, contemporary classical
- Country of origin: U.S.
- Location: Hollywood (1946–47); New York City (1947–1954)

Dial Records was an American record company and label that specialized first in bebop jazz and then in contemporary classical music. It was founded in 1946 by Ross Russell. Notable artists who recorded for Dial include Charlie Parker, who signed an exclusive one-year recording contract with Russell on 26 February 1946, as well as Miles Davis, Max Roach, and Milt Jackson. Dial Records initially pressed its music for the Tempo Music Shop of Hollywood, California, but soon relocated to New York City.

In the summer of 1949, Ross Russell announced a change of focus, with the label turning to the release of classical music by contemporary composers. The first release in this new series was Béla Bartók's Sonata for Two Pianos and Percussion. This series, titled the Library of Contemporary Classics, was inspired when Russell obtained the master tape of a recording of Arnold Schoenberg's Chamber Symphony No. 1 from Blue Star Records in Paris, in lieu of payment for a number of Dial jazz masters for European distribution.

Russell's interests shifted focus again in 1953, when he made field recordings of calypso music in the British, French, and Netherlands West Indies. This resulted in the Dial Ethnic Series (Dial 400 label) of ten ten-inch 33 1/3 rpm discs, issued between June and November 1953.

Dial also continued to release material from jazz sessions recorded earlier, but in 1954 Russell sold his jazz recordings to Concert Hall Records, sending them the masters, pressing lists, and log sheets on June 3, 1954.

Mosaic Records released a limited edition box-set (CD) of Dial recordings called The Complete Dial Modern Jazz Sessions.

== Releases ==
- Dial 1002: "A Night in Tunisia" and "Ornithology." Both tracks were recorded by the Charlie Parker Septet on 28 March 1946. On its release, Billboard considered it "A collector's item".
- Dial 1035: "Get Happy" and "Congo Blues." Session led by vibraphonist Red Norvo, featuring Dizzy Gillespie (tp), Charlie Parker(as), Flip Phillips (ts), Teddy Wilson (p), Slam Stewart (b), Specs Powell (d), recorded at WOR Studios, NYC, June 6, 1945.
- Dial 1045: "Sing Hallelujah" and "Bird's Blues." Same session as Dial 1035
- Dial LP 903: Re-release of Dial 1035/1045, with "Sing Hallelujah" renamed "Hallelujah" and "Bird's Blues" renamed "Slam Slam Blues."

=== Library of Contemporary Classics ===
- Dial No. 1: Béla Bartók, Sonata for Two Pianos and Percussion. William Masselos and Maro Ajemian, pianos; Saul Goodman and Abe Marcus, percussion. Recorded New York, 1949.
- Dial No. 2: Arnold Schoenberg, Chamber Symphony No. 1. Orchestre des Concerts Pasdeloup, conducted by Pierre Dervaux. Recorded Paris, 1949.
- Dial No. 3: Arnold Schoenberg, Ode to Napoleon Buonaparte, Op. 41; String Trio, Op. 45. Villers String Quartet; Jacques Monod, piano; Ellen Adler (recitation), conducted by René Leibowitz; Koldofsky Trio.
- Dial No. 4: Arnold Schoenberg, Third String Quartet, Op. 30. Pro Arte Quartet (Rudolf Kolisch, Albert Rahier, Bernard Milofsky, Ernst Friedlander).
- Dial No. 5: Alban Berg, Lyric Suite. Pro Arte Quartet (Rudolf Kolisch, Albert Rahier, Bernard Milofsky, Ernst Friedlander).
- Dial No. 6: Alan Hovhaness, Piano Concerto (Lousadzak); Tzaikerk, for flute, violin, timpani, and strings; Achtamar, for piano solo; Shatakh, for piano and violin. Maro Ajemian, piano; Anahid Ajemian, violin; Phillip Kaplan, flute; Saul Goodman, timpani; Manhattan Chamber Orchestra, conducted by Alan Hovhaness.
- Dial No. 7: Anton Webern, 5 Movements for String Quartet; 6 Bagatelles; Symphony op. 21. Pro Arte String Quartet, Paris Chamber Orchestra, conducted by René Leibowitz.
- Dial No. 8: Olivier Messiaen, Visions de L'Amen
- Dial No. 9: Alban Berg, Chamber Concerto for Violin, Piano, and Thirteen Wind Instruments. Roland Charny, violin; Jacques-Louis Monod, piano; Orchestre de chambre Paul Kuentz, conducted by René Leibowitz.
- Dial No. 10: Igor Stravinsky, Suite no. 1; Renard; Volga Boatman; Elegy;Berceuse du Chat. Milofsky, Carmin, Conducted by Robert Craft.
- Dial No. 11: Gosta Nystroem, Sinfona del Mare. Ingrid Eksell, Stockholm Orchestra, conducted by Tor Mann.
- Dial No. 12: Igor Stravinsky, Mavra
- Dial No. 13: Arnold Schoenberg, Woodwind Quintet op. 26. Metropolitan Wind Quintet.
- Dial No. 14: Arnold Schoenberg, Fantasy op. 49a, 6 Little Piano Pieces, 5 Piano Pieces op. 23. Gwendolyn Koldofsky, Eduard Steuermann.
- Dial No. 15: Alban Berg, Seven Songs of Youth; "Schliesse mir die Augen beide"; An Leukon; Four Songs Op. 2 (orch. Leibowitz); Four Pieces for Clarinet and Piano, Op. 5. Bethany Beardslee, soprano; Jacques-Louis Monod, piano. Irene Joachim, soprano; chamber orchestra conducted by René Leibowitz; Earl Thomas, clarinet; Jacques-Louis Monod, piano. Recorded 1951.
- Dial No. 16: Arnold Schoenberg, Pierrot Lunaire, conducted by René Leibowitz.
- Dial No. 17: Anton Webern, Concerto for Nine Instruments, conducted by René Leibowitz.
- Dial Nos. 19-20: John Cage, Sonatas and Interludes for prepared piano. Maro Ajemian, prepared piano. Recorded New York, 1951.

== See also ==
- Charlie Parker on Dial
- Complete Charlie Parker on Dial
- List of record labels
