= Ross Russell (jazz) =

American jazz producer and author

Ross Moody Russell (March 18, 1909 – January 31, 2000) was an American jazz producer and writer. He was the founder of Dial Records.

Russell wrote pulp fiction in the 1930s. His heroes were Dashiell Hammett and, especially, Raymond Chandler, on whom he wrote an unfinished study. He also worked as a reporter, at one point writing on Luis Russell while on tour. He was in the United States Merchant Marine during World War II. He served in the North Atlantic and was shipwrecked on Novaya Zemlya far above the Arctic Circle. His accounts of this episode appeared in Life magazine and two other periodicals. Later, he had long duty in the South Pacific. After the War, he founded his own record store, the Tempo Music Shop, in Hollywood. In 1946, he formed Dial Records in order to record Charlie Parker, who was in Los Angeles at the time. He also recorded Dizzy Gillespie, Erroll Garner, Howard McGhee, Dodo Marmarosa, Dexter Gordon, Wardell Gray and Earl Coleman. Russell retained all the alternative takes recorded, which sometimes made releases of his material particularly extensive. He shut Dial down in 1949 and spent several years away from jazz music as owner of a golf course and other pursuits.

Russell's jazz novel The Sound, a book inspired by Parker's life, came out in 1961. In 1971, he published a nonfiction book, Jazz Style in Kansas City and the Southwest, and two years later his biography Bird Lives! was published. Bird Lives! was criticized for its factual inaccuracies; some of the details Russell relates were shown to be fictional. Russell also wrote articles for jazz magazines and taught at the University of California and Palomar College. His large collection of records, books, periodicals, manuscripts, correspondence, interviews, and other materials was sold to the Ransom Center at the University of Texas at Austin in 1981. After retirement he lived variously in the California desert, South Africa, Spain, and Niland, California, on the Salton Sea. He was writing another book on bebop at the time of his death in 2000. He was married five times and had four children. He was buried at the Riverside National Cemetery in Riverside, California.
