= Cuttin' Loose =

Studio album by Doug Raney Quintet
- Released: 1979
- Recorded: August 17, 1978
- Studio: Copenhagen, Denmark
- Genre: Jazz
- Length: 44:14
- Label: SteepleChase; SCS 1105
- Producer: Nils Winther

Doug Raney chronology
Introducing Doug Raney (1977)	Cuttin' Loose (1979)	Stolen Moments (1979)

Cuttin' Loose is the second album led by guitarist Doug Raney recorded in 1978 and released on the Danish label, SteepleChase.

== Reception ==
Professional ratings
Review scores
Source	Rating
AllMusic	3/5 stars
The Penguin Guide to Jazz Recordings	3/4 stars

Dave Nathan of AllMusic states "Cuttin' Loose is a steadfast mainstream jazz session, and is recommended".

== Track listing ==
1. "Lean Years" (Pat Martino) – 5:59
2. "How Deep Is the Ocean?" (Irving Berlin) – 9:37
3. "Arrival" (Horace Parlan) – 4:09 Bonus track on CD
4. "If You Could See Me Now" (Tadd Dameron) – 4:55
5. "Frank-ly Speaking" (Parlan) – 5:22
6. "You Don't Know What Love Is" (Gene de Paul, Don Raye) – 8:09
7. "Four" (Eddie Vinson) – 5:45

== Personnel ==
- Doug Raney – guitar
- Bernt Rosengren – tenor saxophone, flute
- Horace Parlan – piano
- Niels-Henning Ørsted Pedersen – bass
- Billy Hart – drums
