= Nardis (album) =

Studio album by Jimmy Raney and Doug Raney
- Released: 1983
- Recorded: March 7, 1983
- Studio: Easy Sound Studio, Copenhagen, Denmark
- Genre: Jazz
- Length: 47:04
- Label: SteepleChase
- Producer: Nils Winther

Jimmy Raney chronology
The Master (1983)	Nardis (1983)	Wisteria (1985)

Doug Raney chronology
I'll Close My Eyes (1982)	Nardis (1983)	Meeting the Tenors (1983)

Nardis is an album by jazz guitarist Jimmy Raney with his son, Doug Raney, that was released in 1983 by SteepleChase.

Professional ratings
Review scores
Source	Rating
AllMusic	3.5/5 stars
The Penguin Guide to Jazz Recordings	3.5/4 stars

== Track listing ==
1. "There Will Never Be Another You" (Harry Warren, Mack Gordon) – 5:46
2. "I Can't Get Started" (Vernon Duke, Ira Gershwin) – 10:11
3. "All God's Chillun Got Rhythm" (Walter Jurmann, Gus Kahn, Bronisław Kaper) – 6:01
4. "What's New?" (Bob Haggart, Johnny Burke) – 6:38
5. "Nardis" (Miles Davis) – 7:05
6. "Easy to Love" (Cole Porter) – 6:21
7. "Canon" (Jimmy Raney) – 5:17 Bonus track on CD reissue

== Personnel ==
- Jimmy Raney – guitar
- Doug Raney – guitar
