= Glad I Found You =

Studio album by Horace Parlan
- Released: 1984
- Recorded: July 30, 1984
- Genre: Jazz
- Length: 42:19
- Label: SteepleChase

Horace Parlan chronology
Like Someone in Love (1983)	Glad I Found You (1984)	Little Esther (1987)

Glad I Found You is an album by American jazz pianist Horace Parlan featuring performances recorded in 1984 and released on the Danish-based SteepleChase label.

== Reception ==
The AllMusic review by Scott Yanow stated: "Parlan sounds inspired by the other musicians on this spirited hard bop set".

Professional ratings
Review scores
Source	Rating
AllMusic	4.5/5 stars
The Penguin Guide to Jazz Recordings	3.5/4 stars

== Track listing ==
All compositions by Horace Parlan except as indicated

1. "Monday Morning Blues" - 4:52
2. "Hip Walk" (Bernt Rosengren) - 10:06
3. "Oblivion" (Bud Powell) - 6:02
4. "Something for Silver" - 7:49
5. "Glad I Found You" (Al Levitt) - 6:58
6. "Afternoon in Paris" (John Lewis) - 6:32

== Personnel ==
- Horace Parlan - piano
- Thad Jones - flugelhorn
- Eddie Harris - tenor saxophone
- Jesper Lundgaard - bass
- Aage Tanggaard - drums
