= Stolen Moments (Jimmy Raney and Doug Raney album) =

Studio album by Jimmy Raney & Doug Raney
- Released: 1979
- Recorded: April 19, 1979
- Studio: Copenhagen, Denmark
- Genre: Jazz
- Length: 39:48
- Label: SteepleChase
- Producer: Nils Winther

Doug Raney chronology
Cuttin' Loose (1978)	Stolen Moments (1979)	Duets (1979)

Jimmy Raney chronology
Solo (1976)	Stolen Moments (1979)	Duets (1979)

Stolen Moments is an album by guitarists Jimmy Raney and Doug Raney recorded in 1979 and released on the Danish label SteepleChase.

== Reception ==
Professional ratings
Review scores
Source	Rating
AllMusic	4.5/5 stars

Scott Yanow of AllMusic states "The guitarists blend together quite well, and often one does not know who is soloing; the results should delight fans of cool-toned modern mainstream guitar".

== Track listing ==
1. "Jonathan's Waltz" (Jimmy Raney) – 3:55
2. "Chelsea Bridge" (Billy Strayhorn) – 5:12
3. "Stolen Moments" (Oliver Nelson) – 5:54
4. "How My Heart Sings" (Earl Zindars) – 4:52
5. "I Should Care" (Axel Stordahl, Paul Weston, Sammy Cahn) – 6:41
6. "Samba Teekens" (Jimmy Raney) – 6:10
7. "Alone Together" (Arthur Schwartz, Howard Dietz) – 7:01

== Personnel ==
- Jimmy Raney, Doug Raney – guitar
- Michael Moore – bass
- Billy Hart – drums
