= Blue and White =

Blue and White may refer to:

- Israeli flag
- Blue and White (political party), an active Israeli political party
- Blue and White (political alliance), a defunct Israeli political alliance
- Flag of Greece
- The Blue and White, a magazine written by undergraduates at Columbia University
- Power Macintosh G3 (Blue & White)
- Toronto Maple Leafs or Blue and White, a National Hockey League team
- Blue and White (album), a 1984 album by guitarist Doug Raney
- "Blue and White" (Duke fight song), for Duke University and its athletic teams
- Toronto Varsity Blues, the athletic teams of the University of Toronto
- "The Blue and White" (song), a University of Toronto Varsity Blues fight song
- University of Connecticut known for their colors, blue and white

== See also ==
- Blue and white porcelain, a portion of Chinese culture
- Blue-and-white flycatcher, a migratory songbird from Asia
- Blue-and-white mockingbird, from Central America
- Blue-and-white swallow, a passerine bird from South America
- Goodbye Blue & White, an album by Less Than Jake
- The White and Blue, former name of Brigham Young University's student paper
