= I'll Close My Eyes =

I'll Close My Eyes may refer to:

- "I'll Close My Eyes" (song), a 1945 song by Billy Reid
- I'll Close My Eyes (Doug Raney album), 1982
- I'll Close My Eyes (Mark Murphy album), 1991
