= Sweet Silence Studios =

Recording studio in Copenhagen

Sweet Silence Studios was the leading Danish recording studio for rock music during most of its existence. It was originally built in Amager by Danish engineers Freddy Hansson, Flemming Rasmussen and Stig Kreutzfeldt beginning in February 1976. Flemming Rasmussen was immediately hired as assistant engineer, who later became producer and main engineer, taking full ownership of the studio in 1999. The studios relocated a short distance, start 2000, sometimes being credited as "Sweet Silence Upstair Studios" afterward, and closed in 2008. The building was demolished in 2009 to make way for an apartment complex and a car park. Rasmussen then moved to Winding Road Studios in Copenhagen, where he stayed until opening Sweet Silence North in Helsingør in January 2015. The studio in Helsingør was closed December 2017, and moved to Copenhagen, January 2018 in Bådehavnsgade, Sydhavnen.

Recordings
| Date | Artist | Album |
|---|---|---|
| 1976 | Lone Star | Lone Star |
| 1976 | Gasolin' | Efter endnu en dag |
| 1977 | Dr. Hook | Makin' Love and Music |
| 1977 | Shit & Chanel | Shit & Chanel Nº 5 |
| 1978 | Ringo Starr | Aborted sessions. Vocals for “As Far As We Can Go” were utilized for Starr's 1983 limited release album Old Wave |
| 1978 | C.V. Jørgensen | Vild i varmen |
| 1978 | Doug Raney Quartet | Introducing Doug Raney |
| 1979 | Bifrost | Læn Dem ikke ud |
| 1980 | Kliché | Supertanker |
| 1980 | Chet Baker Quartet | No Problem |
| 1981 | Rainbow | Difficult to Cure |
| 1983 | Rainbow | Bent Out of Shape |
| 1984 | Metallica | Ride the Lightning |
| 1985 | Doug Raney Quintet | Lazy Bird |
| 1986 | Metallica | Master of Puppets |
| 1987 | Pretty Maids | Future World |
| 1990 | King Diamond | The Eye |
| 1991 | Mercyful Fate/King Diamond | A Dangerous Meeting |
| 1998 | Ace of Base | Cruel Summer |
