= Jesper Lundgaard =

Danish bassist, bandleader, and composer (born 1954)

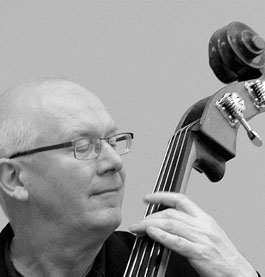

Background information
- Born: 12 June 1954 (age 72)
- Origin: Hillerød, Denmark
- Genres: Jazz
- Occupations: Musician, composer, bandleader, music producer
- Instruments: Double bass, bass guitar
- Years active: 1976–present
- Labels: SteepleChase, Storyville
- Website: Official website

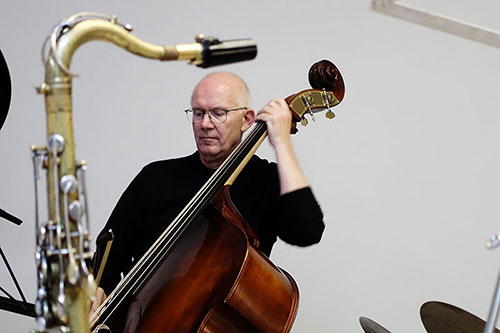
Jesper Lundgaard at Aarhus Jazz Festival 2015

Jesper Lundgaard (born 12 June 1954) is a Danish jazz bassist, bandleader, composer and record producer. Since his debut in the mid-1970s, he has been among the most prominent bassists in Danish jazz and as a sideman he has appeared on more than 400 albums both with Danish and leading American jazz musicians.

== Biography ==
Jesper Lundgaard was born in 1954 in Hillerød, Denmark. After first playing guitar for a few years, he started to play bass at age 16. In 1976 he began to study music at Århus University and the same year he became part of Århus' jazz scene when he joined Bent Eriksen's trio. There he met Danish jazz musicians such as Thomas Clausen, Alex Riel, Niels Jørgen Steen, Finn Ziegler, Jesper Thilo, Jørgen Emborg and Jan Zum Vohrde as well as many American musicians, including Dexter Gordon, Harry Sweets Edison, Eddie Lockjaw Davis, Joe Newman, Benny Waters, Hal Singer, Thad Jones, Mel Lewis, Pepper Adams, Howard McGhee, Roy Eldridge and Doug and Jimmy Raney. Lundgaard soon established himself as one of the leading jazz bassists on the Danish jazz scene.

In 1978 he became a member of the Thad Jones / Mel Lewis Orchestra and went on a 3-month European tour which would become its last before Thad Jones left the band and it changed its name simply to the Mel Lewis Jazz Orchestra.

After the tour both Thad Jones and Jesper Lundgaard settled in Copenhagen. Lundgaard became bassist-in-residence at the La Fontaine Jazz Club and also played frequently at other venues such as Jazzhus Montmartre and Slukefter, accompanying musicians such as Benny Carter, Teddy Wilson, Jay McShann, Dorothy Donegan, Phineas Newborn, Mose Allison and Stanley Turrentine. In 1979 he also started recording for SteepleChase Records, appearing on around 40 albums from this label. He was also a sideman for musicians such as Benny Carter and Teddy Wilson on albums released on Storyville Records. He has also recorded with Chet Baker and Duke Jordan on some albums released by Japanese labels.

Up through the 1980s, Lundgaard was a member of the Radiojazzgruppen, Ernie Wilkins' Almost Big Band and Thad Jones' Danish big band Eclipse, Parallel to this he went on numerous tours with American musicians. These included lengthy tours with Doug and Jimmy Raney to the Netherlands, France and Germany and others with Tommy Flanagan and Ed Thigpen. In the mid-1980s he also became a member of Bob Rockwell's quartet after Rockwell had become the third former The Thad Jones / Mel Lewis Orchestra-member to permanently move to Copenhagen in 1984.

From 1989 to 1991 he was a member of the DR Big Band and in 1993 he joined Svend Asmussen's quartet in which he still plays.

In 1994 he formed the Repertory Quartet which released six albums before it was dissolved in 2000.

He has also taught and conducted master classes at educational institutions in Denmark as well as at conservatories in Rotterdam, Zürich and Helsinki.

== Gallery ==
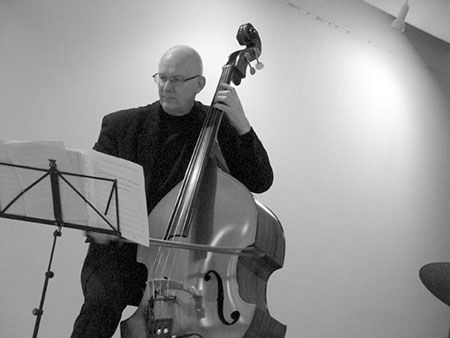

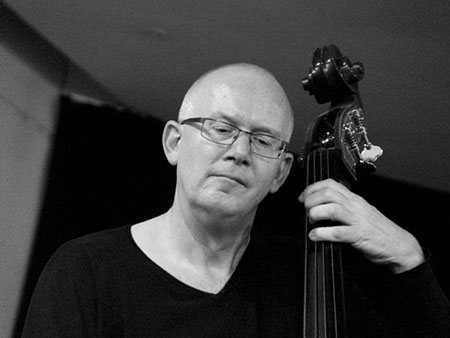

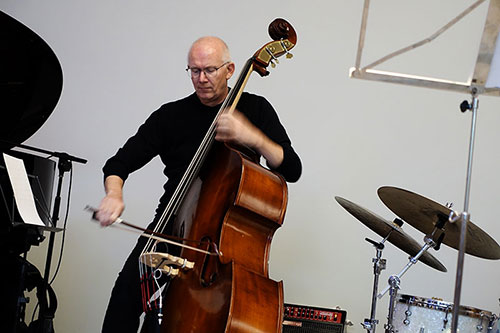

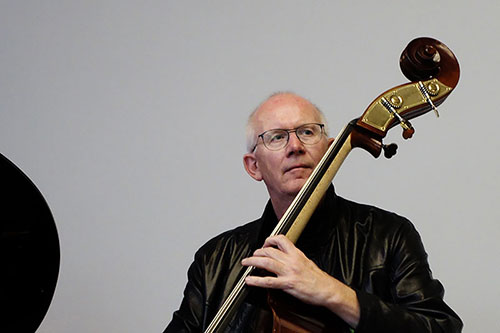

== Loft Studio ==
Since 1986 Lundgaard worked with audio engineering. Since 1991 he has operated his own recording studio, the Loft Studio, in which he has produced some 40 albums for other artists.

== ARCO-amplification ==
Since 2004 he has developed a new amplifier for double bass and electric bass which is small, lightweight, and very powerful and in 2007 he established a small company, ARCO-amplification, which sells it.

== Discography ==
=== As a leader ===
- Nuages with Boulou Ferre, Elios Ferre (SteepleChase, 1986)
- Live with Paul Bley (SteepleChase, 1986)
- Live Again with Paul Bley (SteepleChase, 1987)
- This Bass Was Made for Walking (Music Mecca, 1994)
- Playing in the Breeze with Thomas Fryland, Jacob Fischer (1995)
- Fine Together with Anders Lindskog, Jacob Fischer (Touche, 1999)
- Celebration with Alex Riel, Kenny Werner (Stunt, 2001)
- Play the Music of Borge Roger Henrichens with Thomas Clausen (Music Mecca, 2002)
- Two Basses with Mads Vinding (Touche, 2002)
- Relaxin' with Horace with Horace Parlan, Ed Thigpen (Stunt, 2004)
- Tributes with Jesper Thilo, Jan Lundgren (Music Mecca, 2005)
- Coming in from the Dark with Mette Juul, Alex Riel, Heine Hansen (Cowbell, 2010)
- Blue Rain with Thomas Clausen, Tomas Franck, Billy Hart (Stunt, 2015)
- 2016 with Hans Ulrick. Niclas Knudsen (Storyville, 2016)

=== As sideman ===
With Lotte Anker – Mette Petersen Quartet

- Beyond the Mist (Stunt, 1989)

With Chet Baker

- When Sunny Gets Blue (SteeplChase, 1986)

With Paul Bley

- Questions (SteepleChase, 1985)
- My Standard (SteepleChase, 1985)

With Benny Carter

- Summer Serenade (Storyville, 1980 [1982])

With Eddie "Lockjaw" Davis

- All of Me (SteepleChase, 1983)

With Teddy Edwards

- Out of This World (SteepleChase, 1980)

With Tommy Flanagan

- Flanagan's Shenanigans (Storyville, 1994)
- Let's Play the Music of Thad Jones (Enja, 1993)

With Frank Foster

- The House That Love Built (SteepleChase, 1982)

With Martin Jacobsen

- At The Jazz House (SteepleChase, 2015)

With Thad Jones

- Live at Montmartre (Storyville, 1978)
- Eclipse (Storyville, 1979)

With The Thad Jones / Mel Lewis Orchestra

- Body and Soul (West Wind, 1979)

With Duke Jordan

- Time on My Hands (SteepleChase, 1988)
- As Time Goes By (SteepleChase, 1989)

With Kirk Lightsey

- Isotope (Criss Cross, 1983)

With Warne Marsh

- A Ballad Album (Criss Cross Jazz, 1983)

With Phineas Newborn Jr.

- Tivoli Encounter (Storyville, [1979] 1997)

With Horace Parlan

- Like Someone in Love (SteepleChase, 1983)
- Glad I Found You (SteepleChase, 1984)

With Doug Raney

- I'll Close My Eyes (SteepleChase, 1982)
- Meeting the Tenors (Criss Cross, 1983)
- Blue and White (SteepleChase, 1984)
- Lazy Bird (SteepleChase, 1984)
- Something's Up (SteepleChase, 1988)
- The Doug Raney Quintet (SteepleChase, 1988)

With Jimmy Raney

- Raney '81 (Criss Croes, 1981) with Eric Ineke
- The Master (Criss Cross, 1983)

== Awards ==
- 1982 Ben Webster Prize
- 1992 JASA prize

== See also ==
- Danish jazz
