= Ben Besiakov =

Danish pianist and keyboardist

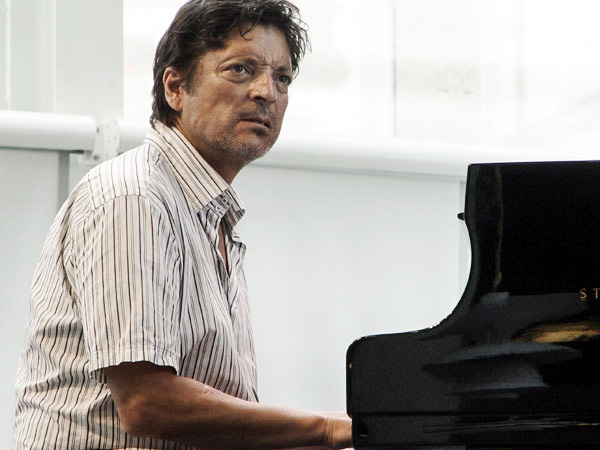
Ben Besiakov Aarhus Jazz Festival 2011.

Ben Besiakov, also Ben Besiakow (born October 27, 1956, Copenhagen) is a Danish jazz pianist and keyboardist.

== Background ==
Besiakov played in jazz and jazz fusion ensembles starting in the early 1970s, including the groups Buki-Yamaz, Creme Fraiche, Engine, Soul Service, and Space Train. He led his own trio ensemble, which recorded for SteepleChase Records, and in 1990 was awarded the Ben Webster Prize. He also played in groups led by Bent Jaedig, Jonas Johansen, Uffe Markussen, and Jens Winther.

== Career ==
Besiakov has performed and recorded with musicians such as Richard Boone, Johnny Dyani, Al Foster, Tomas Franck, Joe Henderson, Dave Liebman, Celso Mendes, James Moody, Caecilie Norby, Adam Nussbaum, Doug Raney, Conny Sjöqvist, Steve Swallow, and Jesper Thilo.

He also played at the Copenhagen Club La Fontaine in the 60s and 70s.

== Discography ==
As leader

- You Stepped Out Of A Dream (SteepleChase, 1990)
- Hey, Why Don’t We Play Mack The Knife Real Slow And In B Minor (Stunt, 1991)
- Choo Choo (Stunt, 1998)
- Aviation (Stunt, 2001)

With Doug Raney

- Blue and White (SteepleChase, 1984)
- Lazy Bird (SteepleChase, 1984)
- Something's Up (SteepleChase, 1988)

With Jesper Thilo

- West Coast Blues (Music Mecca)
