= Aage Tanggaard =

Danish jazz drummer and record producer (born 1957)

Aage Tanggaard (born 25 February 1957) is a Danish jazz drummer and record producer. A pupil of Michael Carvin and Ed Thigpen, he has been a member of several notable bands; including Radiojazzgruppen, Ernie Wilkins' Almost Big Band and the Hamburg-based NDR Big Band. He has also performed and recorded extensively, beginning from 1982, with Stan Getz, Roland Hanna, Michal Urbaniak, Horace Parlan, Duke Jordan, Chet Baker, Paul Bley, Lee Konitz, Dexter Gordon, Clark Terry and Doug Raney among other notable artists. He is the founder of Audiophon Recording Studio where he works as a producer.

== Selected discography ==
As sideman

- 1982 So Nice Duke (Duke Jordan)
- 1982 The House That Love Built (Frank Foster)
- 1983 Montreux (Ernie Wilkins)
- 1983 Plays Standards, Vol. 1: Autumn Leaves (Duke Jordan)
- 1984 Blue and White (Doug Raney)
- 1984 Glad I Found You (Horace Parlan)
- 1984 Take Good Care of My Heart (Michal Urbaniak)
- 1985 Questions (Paul Bley)
- 1988 My Favourite Songs, Vols. 1-2: The Last Great Concert (Chet Baker)
- 1994 This Time It's Real (Roland Hanna)
- 1997 I Remember You: The Legacy, Vol. 2 (Chet Baker)
- 1998 Bravissimo, Vol. 2: 50 Years of NDR Big Band Germany (NDR Big Band)
- 2006 Resource/Action. Re. Action (Svend Asmussen/Ed Thigpen Quartet)
- 2009 I Should Care (Duke Jordan)
