= Midnight Moonlight (Duke Jordan album) =

Studio album by Duke Jordan
- Released: 1980
- Recorded: February 1 & 6, March 29, April 5 and May 29, 1979
- Studio: Sweet Silence Studios in Copenhagen, Denmark
- Genre: Jazz
- Length: 40:19
- Label: SteepleChase SCS 1143
- Producer: Nils Winther

Duke Jordan chronology
Solo Masterpieces Vol. 1 (1979)	Midnight Moonlight (1980)	Solo Masterpieces Vol. 2 (1979)

Midnight Moonlight is a solo album by pianist Duke Jordan recorded in 1979 and released on the Danish SteepleChase label.

== Reception ==
Professional ratings
Review scores
Source	Rating
AllMusic	2.5/5 stars
The Penguin Guide to Jazz Recordings	2.5/4 stars

AllMusic awarded the album 2½ stars.

== Track listing ==
All compositions by Duke Jordan

1. "Midnight Moonlight"- 5:03
2. "Dance in Plaid" - 2:44
3. "Wait and See" - 4:33
4. "Mellow Mood" - 3:05
5. "Yes I Will" - 2:22
6. "Table Chess" - 2:39
7. "Orange Mist" - 3:15
8. "Gabrielle's Wish" - 3:06
9. "Jordanish" - 3:15
10. "Swedish Honey" - 3:17
11. "Danish Pastry" - 3:22
12. "St. Germain" - 3:57

== Personnel ==
- Duke Jordan - piano
