= Steve Millhouse =

American bassist (born 1969)

Steve Milhouse
- Born: 3 January 1969 (age 57); Phoenix
- Genres: Jazz, R&B, Rock, Classical, Broadway
- Occupation: Bassist
- Instruments: contrabass guitar and double bass
- Years active: 1984 –
- Website: stevemillhouse.com

Steve Millhouse is a professional bassist based in New York City, known for his expertise on both the electric bass and double bass.

== Biography ==
From 2007 to 2023, he performed on Broadway. In the Broadway production of Charlie and the Chocolate Factory, he played electric and double bass.

Between 2010 and 2015, Millhouse performed around the world with singer Ute Lemper. He played on her 2013 album Forever: The Love Poems of Pablo Neruda and was part of her tour, which included a performance at the Palau de la Música Catalana in Barcelona, Sydney Opera House, SFJAZZ Center and the Sala São Paulo. In 2015, he also recorded for her album The 9 Secrets.

Millhouse performed in the plays Elf at The Theater at Madison Square Garden, It Shoulda Been You in 2015, the 2015 Pippin tour in Tokyo Japan, the Broadway revivals of Pippin in 2013 and Godspell in 2011, the Radio City Music Hall Christmas Spectacular for five seasons, shows at the Daegu International Musical Festival in Daegu, South Korea in 2011 and 2012, and played for many other Broadway shows in NYC and Broadway tours around the US.

Millhouse then formed two trios. The first group is the Steve Millhouse Trio, featuring Millhouse on contrabass guitar, Rich Perry on tenor saxophone, and Eric Halvorson on drums. Their repertoire includes original compositions and innovative renditions of jazz classics. They performed for the first time in Tokyo in 2020. In February 2023, the trio released the album The Unwinding under SteepleChase Records, which includes tracks such as "I Mean You," "Soulville," and the title track "The Unwinding." The liner notes for this album were written by Steve Swallow. Their second album, Looking Back to Today, will be released in March 2025, with liner notes by Neil Tesser.

Millhouse began performing with his second trio, the Steve Millhouse Cinema Trio, in May 2022. This ensemble focuses on exploring music composed for the cinema. The ensemble features Allen Farnham on piano, Eric Halvorson on drums, and Millhouse on contrabass guitar, with special guest Scott Wendholt on trumpet and flugelhorn. Their first album, Valley of the Moon, was released in November 2023. Their album Music on the Way: The Music of Henry Mancini pays homage to the composer, coinciding with the 100th anniversary of Mancini's birth. Critic Bill Milkowski selected the album for his top 100 of 2024.

== Discography ==
Steve Millhouse Trio

- The Unwinding, SteepleChase Records (2023)
- Looking Back to Today (2025)

Steve Millhouse Cinema Trio

- Valley of the Moon, SteepleChase Records (2023)
- Music on the Way: The Music of Henry Mancini (self-released) (2024)
