= Lazy Bird (album) =

Studio album by Doug Raney Quintet
- Released: 1984
- Recorded: November 1, 1984
- Studio: Sweet Silence, Copenhagen, Denmark
- Genre: Jazz
- Length: 52:54
- Label: SteepleChase; SCS 1200
- Producer: Nils Winther

Doug Raney chronology
Blue and White (1983)	Lazy Bird (1984)	Guitar Guitar Guitar (1985)

Lazy Bird is an album by guitarist Doug Raney recorded in 1984 and released on the Danish label, SteepleChase.

== Reception ==
Professional ratings
Review scores
Source	Rating
AllMusic	4/5 stars
The Penguin Guide to Jazz Recordings	3/4 stars

Scott Yanow of AllMusic called it "Excellent modern mainstream straight-ahead jazz".

== Track listing ==
All compositions by Doug Raney except where noted.

1. "Walking the Duck" [take 3] – 3:42 Bonus track on CD reissue
2. "Reggie of Chester" (Benny Golson) – 7:54
3. "Feo's Waltz" – 6:51
4. "Lazy Bird" (John Coltrane) – 9:06
5. "Beatrice" (Sam Rivers) – 7:48
6. "Theme for Ernie" (Fred Lacey) – 14:04
7. "Walking the Duck" – 2:43

== Personnel ==
- Doug Raney – guitar
- Bernt Rosengren – tenor saxophone
- Ben Besiakov – piano
- Jesper Lundgaard – bass
- Ole Jacob Hansen – drums
