= Guitar Guitar Guitar =

Studio album by Doug Raney Trio
- Released: 1985
- Recorded: July 26, 1985
- Studio: Sound Track Studios, Copenhagen, Denmark
- Genre: Jazz
- Length: 58:23
- Label: SteepleChase; SCS 1212
- Producer: Nils Winther

Doug Raney chronology
Lazy Bird (1984)	Guitar Guitar Guitar (1985)	Something's Up (1988)

Guitar Guitar Guitar is an album by guitarist Doug Raney recorded in 1985 and released on the Danish label, SteepleChase.

== Reception ==
Professional ratings
Review scores
Source	Rating
AllMusic	4.5/5 stars
The Penguin Guide to Jazz Recordings	3/4 stars

Scott Yanow of AllMusic states "Doug Raney, still just 29 at the time of what was his ninth recording as a leader, is heard in an intimate pianoless trio ... This album gives one an excellent sampling of Doug Raney's talents".

== Track listing ==
1. "I Thought About You" (Jimmy Van Heusen, Johnny Mercer) – 8:15
2. "Laura" (David Raksin, Mercer) – 7:38
3. "Minor Majority" (Doug Raney) – 5:06
4. "'Round About Midnight" (Thelonious Monk) – 8:14 Bonus track on CD reissue
5. "Come Rain or Come Shine" (Harold Arlen, Johnny Mercer) – 7:15 Bonus track on CD reissue
6. "Solar" (Miles Davis) – 4:42
7. "My Old Flame" (Sam Coslow, Arthur Johnston) – 8:11
8. "Perhaps" (Charlie Parker) – 9:07

== Personnel ==
- Doug Raney – guitar
- Mads Vinding – bass
- Billy Hart – drums
