= Solo (Jimmy Raney album) =

Studio album by Jimmy Raney
- Released: 1978
- Recorded: December 20, 1976
- Studio: RCA Studios, New York City
- Genre: Jazz
- Label: Xanadu; 140
- Producer: Don Schlitten

Jimmy Raney chronology
Live in Tokyo (1976)	Solo (1978)	Stolen Moments (1979)

Solo is an album by guitarist Jimmy Raney which was recorded in 1976 and released on the Xanadu label.

== Reception ==
Professional ratings
Review scores
Source	Rating
Allmusic	4/5 stars

The Allmusic review awarded the album 4 stars stating "This intriguing set features Jimmy Raney in a set of overdubbed guitar duets with himself. He put a lot of thought into the interpretations".

== Track listing ==
All compositions by Jimmy Raney except where noted.

1. "The Fugue" – 6:56
2. "New Signal" – 6:39
3. "How Deep is the Ocean?" (Irving Berlin) – 6:50
4. "The Way You Look Tonight" (Dorothy Fields, Jerome Kern) – 4:27
5. "Wait till You See Her" (Richard Rodgers, Lorenz Hart) – 5:54
6. "Smoke Gets in Your Eyes" (Kern, Otto Harbach) – 5:57
7. "Blues Variations" – 6:29

== Personnel ==
- Jimmy Raney – guitar
