= This Is Always =

Live album by Chet Baker Trio
- Released: 1982
- Recorded: October 4, 1979
- Venue: Jazzhus Montmartre, Copenhagen, Denmark
- Genre: Jazz
- Length: 48:57 CD release with bonus track
- Label: SteepleChase; SCS 1168
- Producer: Nils Winther

Chet Baker chronology
Daybreak (1979)	This Is Always (1982)	Someday My Prince Will Come (1979)

This Is Always is a live album by trumpeter/vocalist Chet Baker which was recorded in 1979 at the Jazzhus Montmartre and released on the Danish SteepleChase label.

Professional ratings
Review scores
Source	Rating
Allmusic	2/5 stars
The Penguin Guide to Jazz Recordings	3/4 stars

== Track listing ==
1. "How Deep Is the Ocean?" (Irving Berlin) – 11:29
2. "House of Jade" (Wayne Shorter) – 7:42
3. "Love for Sale" (Cole Porter) – 10:30
4. "This Is Always" (Harry Warren, Mack Gordon) – 9:14
5. "Way to Go Out" (Phil Urso) – 10:02 Bonus track on CD release

== Personnel ==
- Chet Baker – trumpet, vocals
- Doug Raney – guitar
- Niels-Henning Ørsted Pedersen – bass
