= Duets (Jimmy Raney and Doug Raney album) =

Studio album by Jimmy Raney & Doug Raney
- Released: 1980
- Recorded: April 21, 1979
- Studio: Copenhagen, Denmark
- Genre: Jazz
- Length: 42:39
- Label: SteepleChase; SCS 1134
- Producer: Nils Winther

Doug Raney chronology
Stolen Moments (1979)	Duets (1980)	Listen (1981)

Jimmy Raney chronology
Stolen Moments (1979)	Duets (1979)	Here's That Raney Day (1980)

Duets is an album by guitarists Jimmy Raney and Doug Raney recorded in 1979 and released on the Danish label, SteepleChase.

== Reception ==
Professional ratings
Review scores
Source	Rating
AllMusic	4/5 stars

Scott Yanow of AllMusic states "Although Doug (then 22) was clearly influenced by his father, he had also listened closely to Tal Farlow and Jim Hall; with practice, listeners should be able to tell the Raneys apart".

== Track listing ==
1. "Have You Met Miss Jones?" (Richard Rodgers) – 4:06
2. "My One and Only Love" (Guy Wood, Robert Mellin) – 5:26
3. "Action" (Jimmy Raney) – 5:13
4. "Invitation" (Bronisław Kaper ) – 6:35
5. "It Might as Well Be Spring" (Rodgers) – 5:18
6. "Days of Wine and Roses" (Henry Mancini) – 5:26
7. "Oleo" (Sonny Rollins) – 4:22
8. "My Funny Valentine" (Rodgers) – 6:23

== Personnel ==
- Jimmy Raney, Doug Raney – guitar
