= Meeting the Tenors =

Studio album by Doug Raney Sextet
- Released: 1984
- Recorded: April 29, 1983
- Studio: Studio 44, Monster, Netherlands
- Genre: Jazz
- Length: 48:13
- Label: Criss Cross Jazz; Criss 1006
- Producer: Gerry Teekens

Doug Raney chronology
Nardis (1983)	Meeting the Tenors (1984)	Everything We Love (1983)

Professional ratings
Review scores
Source	Rating
AllMusic	4/5 stars
The Penguin Guide to Jazz Recordings	3/4 stars

Meeting the Tenors is an album by guitarist Doug Raney recorded in 1983 and released on the Dutch label, Criss Cross Jazz.

== Track listing ==
1. "Up in Quincy's Room" (Gigi Gryce) – 7:50
2. "Blues for Bart" (Ferdinand Povel) – 8:58
3. "Waltz Number One" (Horace Parlan) – 6:56
4. "Arrival" (Parlan) – 7:37
5. "Lover Man" (Jimmy Davis, Ram Ramirez, Jimmy Sherman) – 7:29
6. "The Night Has a Thousand Eyes" (Vincent Youmans, Irving Caesar) – 9:20

== Personnel ==
- Doug Raney – guitar
- Ferdinand Povel – tenor saxophone
- Bernt Rosengren – tenor saxophone, flute
- Horace Parlan – piano
- Jesper Lundgaard – bass
- Ole Jacob Hansen – drums
