= Daybreak (Chet Baker album) =

Live album by Chet Baker Trio
- Released: 1980
- Recorded: October 4, 1979
- Venues: Jazzhus Montmartre, Copenhagen, Denmark
- Genre: Jazz
- Length: 48:07 CD release with bonus track
- Labels: SteepleChase; SCS 1142
- Producer: Nils Winther

Chet Baker chronology
No Problem (1979)	Daybreak (1980)	This Is Always (1979)

Daybreak is a live album by trumpeter/vocalist Chet Baker which was recorded in 1979 at the Jazzhus Montmartre and released on the Danish SteepleChase label.

== Reception ==
Professional ratings
Review scores
Source	Rating
Allmusic	3/5 stars
The Rolling Stone Jazz Record Guide	3/5 stars
The Penguin Guide to Jazz Recordings	3/4 stars

The Allmusic review by Scott Yanow states "Baker is in fine form stretching out on these six- to eleven-minute performances".

== Track listing ==
1. "For Minors Only" (Jimmy Heath) – 6:28
2. "Daybreak" (Harold Adamson & Ferde Grofe) – 11:24
3. "You Can't Go Home Again" (Don Sebesky) – 11:04 Bonus track on CD release
4. "Broken Wing" (Richie Beirach) – 8:01
5. "Down" (Miles Davis) – 11:04

== Personnel ==
- Chet Baker – trumpet, vocals
- Doug Raney – guitar
- Niels-Henning Ørsted Pedersen – bass
