= Listen (Doug Raney album) =

Studio album by Doug Raney Quartet
- Released: 1981
- Recorded: December 4, 1980
- Studio: Copenhagen, Denmark
- Genre: Jazz
- Length: 44:37
- Label: SteepleChase; SCS 1144
- Producer: Nils Winther

Doug Raney chronology
Duets (1979)	Listen (1981)	Raney '81 (1981)

Professional ratings
Review scores
Source	Rating
The Penguin Guide to Jazz Recordings	3/4 stars

Listen is the fifth studio album by guitarist Doug Raney, recorded and released in 1980 on Danish label SteepleChase.

== Track listing ==
1. "Come Rain or Come Shine" (Harold Arlen, Johnny Mercer) – 9:00
2. "In a Sentimental Mood" (Duke Ellington) – 5:53
3. "Autumn Song" (Bernt Rosengren) – 6:19
4. "Don't Listen" (Doug Raney) – 8:26
5. "Bird Feathers" (Charlie Parker) – 8:56
6. "Moment's Notice" (John Coltrane) – 6:03

== Personnel ==
- Doug Raney – guitar
- Bernt Rosengren – tenor saxophone
- Jesper Lundgård – bass
- Billy Hart – drums
