= Introducing Doug Raney =

Studio album by Doug Raney
- Released: 1978
- Recorded: September 28–29, 1977
- Studio: Sweet Silence Studios, Copenhagen, Denmark
- Genre: Jazz
- Length: 56:52
- Label: SteepleChase
- Producer: Nils Winther

Doug Raney chronology
Introducing Doug Raney (1978)	Cuttin' Loose (1978)

Introducing Doug Raney is the debut album by jazz guitarist Doug Raney recorded in 1977 and released on the Danish label, SteepleChase.

== Reception ==
Professional ratings
Review scores
Source	Rating
AllMusic	4/5 stars
The Penguin Guide to Jazz Recordings	3/4 stars

Scott Yanow of AllMusic states Raney has "a swinging style and light tone just slightly heavier than that of his father" calling it "An impressive debut".

== Track listing ==
No.	Title	Length
1.	"Mr. P.C." (John Coltrane)	5:33
2.	"Someone to Watch Over Me" (George Gershwin, Ira Gershwin)	6:52
3.	"Bluebird" (Charlie Parker)	6:48
4.	"The End of a Love Affair" (Edward Redding)	7:16
5.	"Casbah" (Tadd Dameron)	10:20
6.	"I Remember You" (Victor Schertzinger, Johnny Mercer)	4:56
7.	"Like Someone in Love" (Jimmy Van Heusen, Johnny Burke)	3:32
8.	"Unit 7" (Sam Jones)	5:55
9.	"On Green Dolphin Street" (Bronisław Kaper, Ned Washington)	5:38

== Personnel ==
- Doug Raney – guitar
- Duke Jordan – piano
- Hugo Rasmussen – double bass
- Billy Hart – drums
