= The House That Love Built =

Studio album by Frank Foster Quartet
- Released: 1982
- Recorded: September 10, 1982
- Studio: Copenhagen, Denmark
- Genre: Jazz
- Length: 53:38 CD release with additional track
- Label: SteepleChase; SCS 1170/SCCD 31170
- Producer: Nils Winther

Frank Foster chronology
| The Frank Foster Non Electric Company (1979) | The House That Love Built (1982) | Two for the Blues (1984) |

The House That Love Built is an album by saxophonist Frank Foster which was recorded in Copenhagen in 1982 and released on the SteepleChase label.

Professional ratings
Review scores
| Source | Rating |
|---|---|
| AllMusic | 4/5 stars |
| The Penguin Guide to Jazz Recordings | 3/4 stars |

== Track listing ==
All compositions by Frank Foster except where noted

1. "I Remember Sonny Stitt" – 7:49
2. "The House That Love Built" – 7:40
3. "John R and Garfield" – 8:13
4. "Scandia Skies" (Kenny Dorham) – 9:57 Additional track on CD release
5. "Lightly Stroking" – 9:28
6. "Dunbar's Delight" – 10:39

== Personnel ==
- Frank Foster – tenor saxophone
- Horace Parlan – piano
- Jesper Lundgaard – double bass
- Aage Tanggaard – drums
