= The Doug Raney Quintet =

Studio album by Doug Raney Quintet
- Released: 1989
- Recorded: September 9, 1988
- Studio: Copenhagen, Denmark
- Genre: Jazz
- Length: 65:37
- Label: SteepleChase; SCS 1249
- Producer: Nils Winther

Doug Raney chronology
Something's Up (1988)	The Doug Raney Quintet (1989)	Blues on a Par (1993)

The Doug Raney Quintet is an album by guitarist Doug Raney recorded in 1988 and released on the Danish label, SteepleChase.

Professional ratings
Review scores
Source	Rating
AllMusic	4.5/5 stars
The Penguin Guide to Jazz Recordings	3.5/4 stars

== Track listing ==
All compositions by Doug Raney except where noted.

No.	Title	Writer(s)	Length
1.	"Fata"	Thomas Franck	11:25
2.	"Fee-Fi-Fo-Fum"	Wayne Shorter	8:00
3.	"Good Morning"	Bernt Rosengren	6:35
4.	"Star Eyes" (Bonus track on CD reissue)	Gene de Paul, Don Raye	8:23
5.	"Speedy Recovery" (Bonus track on CD reissue)		8:11
6.	"God Bless the Child"	Billie Holiday, Arthur Herzog Jr.	11:32
7.	"The Parting of the Ways"	Thomas Franck	11:20

== Personnel ==
- Doug Raney – guitar
- Bernt Rosengren – tenor saxophone
- Tomas Franck – tenor saxophone, soprano saxophone
- Jesper Lundgaard – bass
- Jukkis Uotila – drums
