= When Sunny Gets Blue (album) =

Studio album by Chet Baker Trio
- Released: 1986
- Recorded: February 23, 1986
- Studio: Sound Track Studio, Copenhagen, Denmark
- Genre: Jazz
- Length: 57:08 CD release with bonus tracks
- Label: SteepleChase; SCS 1221
- Producer: Nils Winther

Chet Baker chronology
Silent Nights: A Christmas Jazz Album (1986)	When Sunny Gets Blue (1986)	Chet in Chicago (1986)

When Sunny Gets Blue is an album by trumpeter/vocalist Chet Baker which was recorded in 1986 and released on the Danish SteepleChase label.

== Reception ==
Professional ratings
Review scores
Source	Rating
Allmusic	1.5/5 stars
The Penguin Guide to Jazz Recordings	3.5/4 stars

The Allmusic review by Scott Yanow states "If proof is ever needed that there are too many Chet Baker albums around, this album can serve as evidence. Baker is caught on an off day ... It is a pity, for the recording quality is good, the European rhythm section is fine, and the repertoire is quite suitable. But there are far too many tentative and hesitant moments (along with a few clams) for this set to be on the level it should have been". The Penguin Guide to Jazz Recordings, however, describes the album as "a fine, unpredictable set", and awards it three and a half stars.

== Track listing ==
1. "Long Ago (and Far Away)" (Jerome Kern, Ira Gershwin) – 6:09
2. "Here's That Rainy Day" (Jimmy Van Heusen, Johnny Burke) – 7:05
3. "Two in the Dew" (Butch Lacy) – 8:20
4. "I Should Care" (Axel Stordahl, Paul Weston, Sammy Cahn) – 8:38 Bonus track on CD release
5. "Out of Nowhere" (Johnny Green, Edward Heyman) – 5:22 Bonus track on CD release
6. "When Sunny Gets Blue" (Marvin Fisher, Jack Segal) – 9:08
7. "Isn't It Romantic?" (Richard Rodgers, Lorenz Hart) – 5:19
8. "You'd Be So Nice to Come Home To" (Cole Porter) – 7:17

== Personnel ==
- Chet Baker – trumpet, vocals
- Butch Lacy – piano
- Jesper Lundgaard – bass
- Jukkis Uotila – drums
