= No Problem (Chet Baker album) =

Studio album by Chet Baker Quartet
- Released: 1980
- Recorded: October 2, 1979
- Studio: Sweet Silence, Copenhagen, Denmark
- Genre: Jazz
- Length: 51:19 CD release with bonus track
- Label: SteepleChase; SCS 1131
- Producer: Nils Winther

Chet Baker chronology
All Blues (1979)	No Problem (1980)	Daybreak (1979)

No Problem is an album by trumpeter Chet Baker's Quartet featuring Duke Jordan which was recorded in 1979 and released the following year on the Danish SteepleChase label.

== Reception ==
Professional ratings
Review scores
Source	Rating
Allmusic	2.5/5 stars
The Penguin Guide to Jazz Recordings	3/4 stars

The Allmusic review by Ron Wynn states "Pianist Duke Jordan's presence adds some punch and spark to this quartet session, which is further helped along by bassist Niels-Henning Ørsted Pedersen and selections that are suited for Baker's increasingly mellow and wavering playing.".

== Track listing ==
All compositions by Duke Jordan

1. "No Problem" – 9:45
2. "Sultry Eve" – 7:04
3. "Glad I Met Pat" – 5:08
4. "Kiss of Spain" – 7:15
5. "The Fuzz" – 6:05
6. "My Queen Is Home to Stay" – 7:13
7. "Jealous Blues" – 8:48 Bonus track on CD release

== Personnel ==
- Chet Baker – trumpet
- Duke Jordan – piano
- Niels-Henning Ørsted Pedersen – bass
- Norman Fearrington – drums
