= Raney '81 =

Studio album by Jimmy Raney Quartet featuring Doug Raney
- Released: 1981
- Recorded: February 27, 1981
- Studio: Hilversum, Netherlands
- Genre: Jazz
- Length: 73:56
- Label: Criss Cross
- Producer: Gerry Teekens

Jimmy Raney chronology
Here's That Raney Day (1980)	Raney '81 (1981)	The Master (1983)

Doug Raney chronology
Listen (1981)	Raney '81 (1981)	I'll Close My Eyes (1982)

Raney '81 is an album by jazz guitarist Jimmy Raney with his son, Doug Raney, that was released by Criss Cross Jazz in 1981. The album was the first release for the label and the CD release added six alternative takes.

== Reception ==
Professional ratings
Review scores
Source	Rating
AllMusic	4/5 stars
The Penguin Guide to Jazz Recordings	3.5/4 stars

Scott Yanow of AllMusic states "Together they perform one original and six standards in light but forcefully swinging style. The interplay between the two guitarists is a major plus".

== Track listing ==
1. "What Is This Thing Called Love?" (Cole Porter) – 5:40
2. "This Is New" (Kurt Weill, Ira Gershwin) – 6:01
3. "My Shining Hour" (Harold Arlen, Johnny Mercer) – 4:55
4. "Peri's Scope" (Bill Evans) – 5:15
5. "Sweet and Lovely" (Gus Arnheim, Jules LeMare, Harry Tobias) – 6:29
6. "Chewish Chive and English Brick" (Jimmy Raney) – 4:49
7. "If I Should Lose You" (Ralph Rainger, Leo Robin) – 6:40
8. "What Is This Thing Called Love?" [alternate take] (Porter) – 5:40 Bonus track on CD release
9. "Peri's Scope?" [alternate take] (Evans) – 5:27 Bonus track on CD release
10. "My Shining Hour" [alternate take] (Arlen, Mercer) – 5:02 Bonus track on CD release
11. "Sweet and Lovely?" [alternate take] (Arnheim, LeMare, Tobias) – 6:32 Bonus track on CD release
12. "If I Should Lose You?" [alternate take] (Rainger, Robin) – 6:38 Bonus track on CD release
13. "Chewish Chive and English Brick?" [alternate take] (Jimmy Raney) – 4:48 Bonus track on CD release

== Personnel ==
- Jimmy Raney, Doug Raney – guitar
- Jesper Lundgaard – bass
- Eric Ineke – drums
