= The Master (Jimmy Raney album) =

Studio album by Jimmy Raney
- Released: 1983
- Recorded: February 16, 1983
- Studio: Studio 44, Monster, Netherlands
- Genre: Jazz
- Length: 59:07
- Label: Criss Cross
- Producer: Gerry Teekens

Jimmy Raney chronology
Raney '81 (1981)	The Master (1983)	Nardis (1983)

The Master is an album by jazz guitarist Jimmy Raney that was released by Criss Cross Jazz in 1983. The CD release added two alternative takes.

== Reception ==
Professional ratings
Review scores
Source	Rating
AllMusic	3.5/5 stars
The Penguin Guide to Jazz Recordings	3.5/4 stars
DownBeat	5/5 stars

Ron Wynn of AllMusic states "A nice mid-'80s session with the relaxed, fluid guitar of Jimmy Raney ... He's supported with style by pianist Kirk Lightsey, who emerges as the date's other dominant solo voice".

Bill Milkowski, reviewing for DownBeat, gave the album 5 stars. He wrote, "Raney tempers his technical wizardry with a relaxed, slightly-behind-the-beat sense of swing that makes the date feel good . . . Raney’s liquid phrasing is smooth and unhurried, his articulation impeccable. His sax-like linear approach and advanced harmonic concept provided perhaps the first link between Charlie Christian and Charlie Parker. Forty years later, that still sounds good".

== Track listing ==
1. "The Song Is You" (Jerome Kern, Oscar Hammerstein II) – 5:52
2. "Billie's Bounce" (Charlie Parker) – 6:28
3. "Along Came Betty" (Benny Golson) – 6:16
4. "Just One of Those Things" (Cole Porter) – 3:57
5. "It's All Right With Me" (Cole Porter) – 8:19
6. "Lament"(J. J. Johnson) – 7:54
7. "Tangerine" (Victor Schertzinger, Johnny Mercer) – 6:54
8. "The Song Is You" [alternate take] (Kern, Hammerstein) – 5:58 Bonus track on CD release
9. "Tangerine" [alternate take] (Schertzinger, Mercer) – 6:48 Bonus track on CD release

== Personnel ==
- Jimmy Raney – guitar
- Kirk Lightsey – piano
- Jesper Lundgaard – bass
- Eddie Gladden – drums
