= Questions (album) =

Studio album by Paul Bley
- Released: 1985
- Recorded: February 26, 1985
- Studio: Sound Track Studios, Copenhagen
- Genre: Jazz
- Length: 47:18
- Label: SteepleChase SCS 1205
- Producer: Nils Winther

Paul Bley chronology
Sonor (1984)	Questions (1985)	Diane (1985)

Questions is an album by pianist Paul Bley recorded in Denmark in 1985 and released on the SteepleChase label.

== Reception ==
Professional ratings
Review scores
Source	Rating
Allmusic	4/5 stars
The Penguin Guide to Jazz Recordings	3/4 stars

Allmusic awarded the album 4 stars, stating: "The more normal sounding trio recordings towards the front of the disc sound almost out of place, but the rest of Questions is Bley at his tranquil but never placid best."

== Track listing ==
All compositions by Paul Bley

1. "Lovely" - 6:14
2. "Adventure 1" - 2:09
3. "Adventure 2" - 2:30
4. "Adventure 3" - 1:33
5. "Adventure 4" - 3:16
6. "Beautiful" - 5:07
7. "The Pause is Not Rhythmic" - 4:09 Bonus track on CD
8. "Questions" - 2:40
9. "Here and Gone 1" - 4:45
10. "Here and Gone 2" - 2:18
11. "Here and Gone 3" - 3:36
12. "Here and Gone 4" - 1:58
13. "Fanfare" - 7:03

== Personnel ==
- Paul Bley - piano
- Jesper Lundgaard - bass
- Aage Tanggaard - drums
