= Something's Up =

Studio album by Doug Raney
- Released: 1988
- Recorded: February 26, 1988
- Studio: Hookfarm Digital Studio, Copenhagen, Denmark
- Genre: Jazz
- Length: 61:20
- Label: SteepleChase; SCS 1235
- Producer: Nils Winther

Doug Raney chronology
Guitar Guitar Guitar (1985)	Something's Up (1988)	The Doug Raney Quintet (1988)

Something's Up is an album by guitarist Doug Raney recorded in 1988 and released on the Danish label, SteepleChase.

Professional ratings
Review scores
Source	Rating
AllMusic	3.5/5 stars
The Penguin Guide to Jazz Recordings	3.5/4 stars

== Track listing ==
All compositions by Doug Raney except where noted.

1. "Something's Up" – 6:26
2. "Good Morning Heartache" (Ervin Drake, Dan Fisher, Irene Higginbotham) – 11:08
3. "Speedy Recovery" – 6:07
4. "Upper Manhattan Medical Group" (Billy Strayhorn) – 6:42
5. "Nobody Else But Me" (Bartley Costello, Andrew B. Sterling) – 6:44
6. "Visceral Drives" – 6:52
7. "Dolphin Dance" (Herbie Hancock) – 9:01 Bonus track on CD reissue
8. "Mohawk" (Charlie Parker) – 6:59 Bonus track on CD reissue

== Personnel ==
- Doug Raney – guitar
- Ben Besiakov – piano
- Jesper Lundgaard – bass
- Billy Hart – drums
