= Here's That Raney Day =

Studio album by Jimmy Raney
- Released: 1980
- Recorded: July 21, 1980
- Studio: Black and Blue Open Air Studio, Nice, France
- Genre: Jazz
- Length: 55:13
- Label: Ahead

Jimmy Raney chronology
Duets (1979)	Here's That Raney Day (1980)	Raney '81 (1981)

Here's That Raney Day is an album by jazz guitarist Jimmy Raney that was recorded in France in 1980 and released on the French label Ahead.

Professional ratings
Review scores
Source	Rating
AllMusic	4/5 stars

== Track listing ==
1. "Chewish Chive and English" (Jimmy Raney) – 5:12
2. "Back Home Again in Indiana" (Ballard MacDonald, James F. Hanley) – 4:40
3. "Au Privave" (Charlie Parker) – 5:45
4. "Scrapple from the Apple" (Parker) – 7:10
5. "You Don't Know What Love Is" (Gene de Paul, Don Raye) – 7:34
6. "All the Things You Are" (Jerome Kern, Oscar Hammerstein II) – 7:32
7. "Chasin' the Bird" (Parker) – 7:13
8. "Back Home Again in Indiana" [take 2] (MacDonald, Hanley) – 5:35 Bonus track on CD reissue
9. "Chewish Chive and English" [take 2] (Raney) – 4:32 Bonus track on CD reissue

== Personnel ==
- Jimmy Raney – guitar
- Hank Jones – piano
- Pierre Michelot – bass
- Jimmy Cobb – drums
