= Like Someone in Love (Horace Parlan album) =

Studio album by Horace Parlan
- Released: 1983
- Recorded: March 16, 1983
- Genre: Jazz
- Length: 41:46
- Label: SteepleChase

Horace Parlan chronology
Pannonica (1981)	Like Someone in Love (1983)	Glad I Found You (1984)

Like Someone in Love is an album by American jazz pianist Horace Parlan featuring performances recorded in 1983 and released on the Danish-based SteepleChase label.

== Reception ==
The Allmusic review awarded the album 4 stars.

Professional ratings
Review scores
Source	Rating
Allmusic	4/5 stars
The Penguin Guide to Jazz Recordings	3/4 stars

== Track listing ==
1. "U.M.M.G. (Upper Manhattan Medical Group)" (Billy Strayhorn) - 5:04
2. "Ballade" (Isla Eckinger) - 5:50
3. "Scandia Skies" (Kenny Dorham) - 4:25
4. "Little Esther" (Horace Parlan) - 5:29
5. "Like Someone in Love" (Johnny Burke, Jimmy Van Heusen) - 8:42
6. "Duke Ellington's Sound of Love" (Charles Mingus) - 6:23
7. "Blues in the Closet" (Oscar Pettiford) - 5:53

== Personnel ==
- Horace Parlan - piano
- Jesper Lundgaard - bass
- Dannie Richmond - drums
