= Pannonica (album) =

Live album by Horace Parlan Trio
- Released: 1984
- Recorded: February 11, 1981
- Venue: The Domicile, Munich, West Germany
- Genre: Jazz
- Length: 38:02
- Label: Enja; 4076
- Producer: Horst Weber, Matthias Winckelmann

Horace Parlan chronology
Trouble in Mind (1980)	Pannonica (1984)	Like Someone in Love (1983)

Pannonica is a live album by pianist Horace Parlan's trio which was recorded in Munich in 1981 and released on the German Enja label in 1984.

== Reception ==
Professional ratings
Review scores
Source	Rating
AllMusic	4.5/5 stars

The AllMusic review by Ron Wynn said "The material, mostly standards with some originals and ballads, isn't overly ambitious, but Parlan's dense, strong blues-influenced solos and good interaction among the three principals keeps things moving".

== Track listing ==
1. "No Greater Love" (Isham Jones, Marty Symes) – 5:33
2. "Pannonica" (Thelonious Monk) – 6:22
3. "C Jam Blues" (Duke Ellington) – 7:02
4. "Hi-Fly" (Randy Weston) – 9:18
5. "Who Cares?" (George Gershwin, Ira Gershwin) – 9:47

== Personnel ==
- Horace Parlan – piano
- Reggie Johnson – bass
- Alvin Queen – drums
