= Blue and White (album) =

Studio album by Doug Raney Quartet
- Released: 1984
- Recorded: April 29, 1984
- Studio: Sweet Silence Studios, Copenhagen, Denmark
- Genre: Jazz
- Length: 52:54
- Label: SteepleChase; SCS 1191
- Producer: Nils Winther

Doug Raney chronology
Everything We Love (1983)	Blue and White (1984)	Lazy Bird (1984)

Blue and White is an album by guitarist Doug Raney recorded in 1983 and released on the Danish label, SteepleChase.

== Reception ==
Professional ratings
Review scores
Source	Rating
AllMusic	4/5 stars
The Penguin Guide to Jazz Recordings	3.5/4 stars

Ken Dryden of AllMusic states "Because Doug Raney has recorded almost exclusively for European labels, he isn't as well known in his homeland, but his CDs are well worth exploring".

== Track listing ==
1. "Blue and White" (Nisse Sandström) – 6:21
2. "I Love You" (Cole Porter) – 7:11
3. "Gingerbread Boy" (Jimmy Heath) – 9:39
4. "Old Devil Moon" (Burton Lane, Yip Harburg) – 6:59
5. "Old Folks" (Dedette Lee Hill, Willard Robison) – 5:46
6. "Straight Street" (John Coltrane) – 9:18
7. "Minority" (Gigi Gryce) – 7:28 Bonus track on CD reissue

== Personnel ==
- Doug Raney – guitar
- Ben Besiakov – piano
- Jesper Lundgaard – bass
- Aage Tanggaard – drums
