= I'll Close My Eyes (Doug Raney album) =

Studio album by Doug Raney Quintet
- Released: 1982
- Recorded: July 28, 1982
- Studio: Easy Sound Studio, Copenhagen, Denmark
- Genre: Jazz
- Length: 49:18
- Label: SteepleChase; SCS 1166
- Producer: Nils Winther

Doug Raney chronology
Raney '81 (1981)	I'll Close My Eyes (1982)	Nardis (1983)

Professional ratings
Review scores
Source	Rating
The Penguin Guide to Jazz Recordings	3/4 stars

I'll Close My Eyes is an album by guitarist Doug Raney recorded in 1982 and released on the Danish label, SteepleChase.

== Track listing ==
1. "I'll Close My Eyes" (Billy Reid, Buddy Kaye) – 9:40
2. "Billy's Bossa" (Horace Parlan) – 9:37
3. "You've Changed" (Victor Young) – 7:58
4. "Bolivia" (Cedar Walton) – 7:03
5. "Pullin' Through" (Ole Mathisen) – 6:54 Bonus track on CD reissue

== Personnel ==
- Doug Raney – guitar
- Bernt Rosengren – tenor saxophone, alto flute
- Horace Parlan – piano
- Jesper Lundgaard – bass
- Ole Jacob Hansen – drums
