= Bernt Rosengren =

Swedish jazz saxophonist (1937–2023)

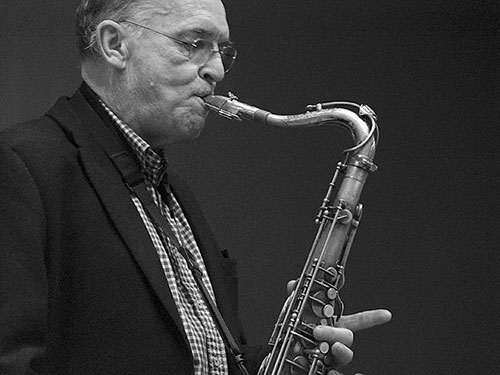

Background information
- Born: 24 December 1937; Stockholm, Sweden
- Died: 15 May 2023 (aged 85) Stockholm, Sweden
- Genres: Jazz, hard bop, post bop
- Occupations: Musician, composer
- Instruments: Tenor saxophone, flute

Bernt Åke Rosengren (24 December 1937 – 15 May 2023) was a Swedish jazz tenor saxophonist. His recordings earned him five Gyllene Skivan awards in Sweden over more than forty years.

== Biography ==
Rosengren first played professionally at age 19, as a member of the Jazz Club 57, and two years later in 1959, he played in the Newport Jazz Band. Roman Polanski's film score composer Krzysztof Komeda used Rosengren in the performance of his jazz score for Polanski's film Knife in the Water (1962). Rosengren recorded a string of highly regarded albums in the 1960s and 1970s, including Stockholm Dues (1965), Improvisations (1969), and Notes from Underground (1974).

Rosengren played in a sextet led by George Russell in the 1960s in Europe. Later in the decade, he moved from hard bop into post-bop experimentation, playing with Don Cherry; in the 1970s, as a member of Sevda led by trumpeter Muvaffak "Maffy" Falay, he began working with elements of Turkish and Middle Eastern music. He also formed his own big band in the 1970s.

In the 1980s, Rosengren worked frequently with American jazz musicians such as Doug Raney, George Russell, Don Cherry and Horace Parlan. He recorded an album of songs from Porgy & Bess in 1996.

Chris Mosey, a jazz critic from All About Jazz, said in his review of Rosengren's album I'm Flying (2009): "All in all, I'm Flying is a worthy Golden Record." Jack Bowers, also writing for All About Jazz, wrote in his review of the same album: "Rosengren, for his part, is a model of elegance and consistency, inspiring his companions without stealing their thunder. Together they comprise a tight-knit and consistently engaging foursome. Besides blowing superbly, Rosengren wrote seven of the album's twelve selections. – Rosengren rides their talents like an Indy car driver, and the result is an exemplary team effort that is as stylish as it is rewarding."

== Awards ==
Rosengren won five Gyllene Skivan awards in Sweden, in 1965, 1968, 1969, 1974 and 2009. He was awarded the Django d'Or Contemporary Star of Jazz in 2000 and Master of Jazz in 2003. Rosengren was also awarded the Illis quorum in 2010.

== Discography ==
=== As leader or co-leader ===
- Stockholm Dues (Columbia EMI, 1965)
- Improvisations (SJR, 1968/9)
- Fly Me To The Sun (Gazell, 1971)
- Notes from Underground (Harvest, 1974)
- Bernt Rosengren Quartet / Trio In Stockholm Vol. 1 (Amigo, 1975)
- Bernt Rosengren Quartet with Bobo Stenson In Stockholm Vol. 2 (Amigo, 1976)
- First Moves (EMI, 1977)
- Bernt Rosengren Big Band with Horace Parlan & Doug Raney (Caprice, 1980)
- Surprise Party (SteepleChase, 1983)
- Live! Featuring Doug Raney (Dragon, 1984)
- Summit Meeting (1984)
- The Hug (1992)
- Late Date: A Tribute to Lars Gullin (Mirrors, 1994)
- Plays George Gershwin's Porgy & Bess (Liphone, 1996)
- Bombastica! 1959-1960 (Jazzland) with Lars Werner (Dragon, 1996)
- Bernt Rosengren Octet Plays Porgy & Bess (Arietta, 1996)
- Bernt Rosengren Octet Plays Evert Taube (Arietta, 1999)
- Bernt Rosengren Tentet Plays Kurt Weill (Arietta, 2000)
- Bernt Rosengren Octet Plays Evert Taube Vol. 2 (Arietta, 2002)
- Inside Pictures: A Tribute to Lars Gullin, Vol. 2 (2002)
- I'm Flying (pb7, 2009)
- Plays Swedish Jazzcompositions (pb 7, 2012)
- In Copenhagen (Stunt, 2013)
- Ballads (pb7, 2015)
- Songs (pb7, 2017)

=== As sideman ===
With Lester Bowie

- Gittin' to Know Y'All (MPS, 1969)

With Don Cherry

- Eternal Rhythm (MPS, 1968)
- Eternal Now (Sonet, 1973)
- Live in Stockholm (Caprice, 2013)
- The Summer House Sessions (Blank Forms, 2021)

With Arne Domnérus

- Face to Face, Dragon, 1999

With Mongezi Feza

- Free Jam (Ayler, 2004)

With Krzysztof Komeda

- Jazz Jamboree '61 Nr. 4 (Muza, 1961) – more extensive CD reissues of this concert on Power Bros, Polonia and Jazz on Film; music from Knife on the Water

With Doug Raney

- Cuttin' Loose (SteepleChase, 1978)
- Listen (SteepleChase, 1980)
- I'll Close My Eyes (SteepleChase, 1982)
- Meeting the Tenors (Criss Cross, 1983)
- Lazy Bird (SteepleChase, 1984)
- The Doug Raney Quintet (SteepleChase, 1988)

With George Russell

- The Essence of George Russell (Sonet, 1971)
- New York Big Band (Soul Note, 1982)

With Tomasz Stańko

- Litania: Music of Krzysztof Komeda (ECM, 1997)

With Idrees Sulieman

- The Camel (Columbia, 1964)
