= Wisteria (Jimmy Raney album) =

Studio album by Jimmy Raney Trio featuring Tommy Flanagan
- Released: 1986
- Recorded: December 30, 1985
- Studio: Van Gelder Studio, Englewood Cliffs, NJ
- Genre: Jazz
- Length: 47:00
- Label: Criss Cross Jazz; Criss 1019
- Producer: Gerry Teekens

Jimmy Raney chronology
In Good Company (1985)	Wisteria (1986)	But Beautiful (1990)

Wisteria is an album by guitarist Jimmy Raney featuring Tommy Flanagan, recorded in 1985 and released on the Dutch label, Criss Cross Jazz. The CD rerelease added one additional track recorded in 1990.

== Reception ==
Professional ratings
Review scores
Source	Rating
AllMusic	4/5 stars
The Penguin Guide to Jazz Recordings	4/4 stars

Scott Yanow of AllMusic states "The interplay between the three musicians is impressive, and the subtle creativity makes repeated listenings of the modern mainstream music quite valuable. Recommended".

== Track listing ==
1. "Hassan's Dream" (Benny Golson) – 7:18
2. "Wisteria" (George Mraz) – 5:32
3. "Ovals" (Jimmy Raney) – 6:25
4. "Out of the Past" (Golson) – 7:04
5. "I Could Write a Book" (Richard Rodgers, Lorenz Hart) – 6:17
6. "Ev'rything I Love" (Cole Porter) – 7:04
7. "All the Things You Are" (Jerome Kern, Oscar Hammerstein II) – 7:18 Bonus track on CD release

== Personnel ==
- Jimmy Raney – guitar
- Tommy Flanagan – piano
- George Mraz – bass
