= Jimmy Raney =

American jazz guitarist

- Born: James Elbert Raney; August 20, 1927; Louisville, Kentucky, U.S.
- Died: May 10, 1995 (aged 67) Louisville, Kentucky, U.S.
- Genres: Jazz, cool jazz
- Occupation: Musician
- Instrument: Guitar
- Years active: 1944–1994
- Labels: Prestige, Xanadu, Criss Cross

James Elbert Raney (August 20, 1927 – May 10, 1995) was an American jazz guitarist, born in Louisville, Kentucky, United States, known for his work from 1951 to 1952 and then from 1953 to 1954 with the Red Norvo trio (replacing Tal Farlow) and, during the same time period, with Stan Getz. In 1954 and 1955, he won the DownBeat Critics' Poll for guitar. Raney worked in a variety of jazz mediums, including cool jazz, bebop, post bop, hard bop, and mainstream jazz.

In 1946, he worked for a time as guitarist with the Max Miller Quartet at Elmer's in Chicago, his first paying gig. Raney also worked in the Artie Shaw Orchestra and collaborated with Woody Herman for nine months in 1948. He also collaborated and recorded with Buddy DeFranco, Al Haig and later on with Bob Brookmeyer. In 1967, alcoholism and other professional difficulties led him to leave New York City and return to his native Louisville. He resurfaced in the 1970s and also did work with his son Doug, who was also a guitarist. His other son Jon is a jazz pianist and maintains a website, devoted to Jimmy and Doug Raney.

Raney lived with Ménière's disease for thirty years, a degenerative condition that led to near deafness in both ears, although this did not stop him from playing. He died of heart failure in Louisville on May 10, 1995. His obituary in The New York Times called him "one of the most gifted and influential postwar jazz guitarists in the world".

== Discography ==
=== As leader ===
- Jimmy Raney featuring Bob Brookmeyer (ABC-Paramount, 1956)
- Jimmy Raney in Three Attitudes (ABC-Paramount, 1957)
- The Fourmost Guitars with Chuck Wayne, Joe Puma, Dick Garcia (ABC-Paramount, 1957)
- 2 Guitars with Kenny Burrell (Prestige, 1957)
- A (Prestige, 1958)
- Jimmy Raney Visits Paris (Dawn, 1958)
- Swingin' in Sweden with George Wallington (EmArcy, 1958)
- Two Jims and Zoot (Mainstream, 1964)
- Strings & Swings (Muse, 1972)
- Guitaristic (Swing 1974)
- Momentum (MPS, 1975)
- Strings Attached with Al Haig (Choice, 1975)
- The Influence (Xanadu, 1975)
- Live in Tokyo (Xanadu, 1976)
- Special Brew with Al Haig (Spotlite, 1976)
- Solo (Xanadu, 1978)
- Stolen Moments with Doug Raney (SteepleChase, 1979)
- Duets (SteepleChase, 1980)
- Jim & I with Attila Zoller (L+R, 1980)
- Here's That Raney Day (Ahead, 1980)
- Raney '81 (Criss Cross, 1981)
- The Date with Martial Solal (Stil Discotheque, 1981)
- Jim & I Live with Attila Zoller (L+R, 1981)
- Nardis with Doug Raney (Steeplechase, 1983)
- Play Duets with Jimmy Raney (JA, 1983)
- The Master (Criss Cross, 1983)
- The Complete Paris Sessions (Vogue, 1984)
- Together! with Sonny Clark (Xanadu, 1986)
- Wisteria (Criss Cross, 1986)
- Jim & I Live at Quasimodo with Attila Zoller (L+R, 1986)
- But Beautiful (Criss Cross, 1992)

=== As sideman ===
With Bob Brookmeyer

- The Dual Role of Bob Brookmeyer (Prestige, 1955)
- The Street Swingers (World Pacific, 1958)
- Trombone Jazz Samba (Verve, 1962)
- Samba Para Dos (Verve, 1963)

With Teddy Charles

- On Campus: Ivy League Jazz Concert (Bethlehem, 1960)
- The Teddy Charles Tentet (Atlantic, 1956)
- Word from Bird (Atlantic, 1957)
- Russia Goes Jazz Swinging (United Artists, 1964)

With Stan Getz

- Stan Getz Plays (Norgran, 1955) – compiles the 10" LPs Stan Getz Plays (Clef MGC 137) and The Artistry of Stan Getz (Clef MGC 143).
- Prezervation (Prestige, 1967)
- The Complete Roost Recordings (Roost/Blue Note/Capitol, 1997) [3-CD set]

With Red Norvo

- Red Norvo Trio (Fantasy, 1955)
- The Red Norvo Trios (Fantasy, 1957)
- Chamber Jazz (MCA Coral, 1975)

With others

- Harry Belafonte, Belafonte Sings the Blues (RCA Victor, 1958)
- Ted Brown, In Good Company (Criss Cross, 1985)
- Vinnie Burke, The Vinnie Burke All-Stars (ABC-Paramount, 1956)
- Ralph Burns, Spring Sequence (Period, 1955)
- Ralph Burns, Bijou (Bethlehem, 1956)
- John Carisi, The New Jazz Sound of Show Boat (Columbia, 1960)
- Al Cohn, Mr. Music (RCA Victor, 1955)
- Dolo Coker, Bob Mover, Barry Harris, Kenny Barron, Jimmy Raney, Anniversary (Xanadu, 1985)
- Cozy Cole & Jimmy McPartland, After Hours (Grand Award, 1956)
- Duke Ellington, Concert at Carnegie Hall (DJM, 1976)
- Terry Gibbs, Hootenanny My Way (Overseas, 1963)
- Urbie Green, Blues and Other Shades of Green (ABC-Paramount, 1955)
- Edmond Hall, Rumpus On Rampart Street (Mount Vernon, 1959)
- Barry Harris, Tokyo: 1976 (Xanadu, 1980)
- Eddie Harris, Bossa Nova (Vee Jay, 1963)
- Mahalia Jackson, Great Gettin' Up Morning (Columbia, 1959)
- Dick Katz, Piano & Pen (Atlantic, 1959)
- Irene Kral, SteveIreneo! (United Artists, 1959)
- Barbara Lea, Lea in Love (Prestige, 1956)
- Mary Ann McCall, Detour to the Moon (Jubilee, 1958)
- Gary McFarland, Point of Departure (Impulse!, 1964)
- Hal McKusick, Hal McKusick Plays, Betty St. Claire Sings (Juibilee, 1955)
- Hal McKusick, The Jazz Workshop (RCA Victor, 1957)
- Charles McPherson, Live in Tokyo (Xanadu, 1976)
- Helen Merrill, The Artistry of Helen Merrill (Mainstream, 1965)
- Oliver Nelson, Full Nelson (Verve, 1963)
- Dave Pike, Limbo Carnival (New Jazz, 1962)
- Dave Pike, Dave Pike Plays the Jazz Version of Oliver! (Moodsville, 1963)
- Dannie Richmond, "In" Jazz for the Culture Set (Impulse!, 1965)
- Aaron Sachs, Clarinet and Co. (Rama, 1957)
- Lalo Schifrin, Lalo = Brilliance (Roulette, 1962)
- Shirley Scott, Latin Shadows (Impulse!, 1965)
- Cal Tjader, Warm Wave (Verve, 1964)
- Lennie Tristano & Buddy DeFranco, Crosscurrents (Capitol, 1972)
- Lennie Tristano & Buddy DeFranco, Cool & Quiet (Capitol, 1982)
- Phil Woods, Early Quintets (Prestige, 1969)

== See also ==
- List of people from the Louisville metropolitan area
