= SteepleChase Records =

Danish record label

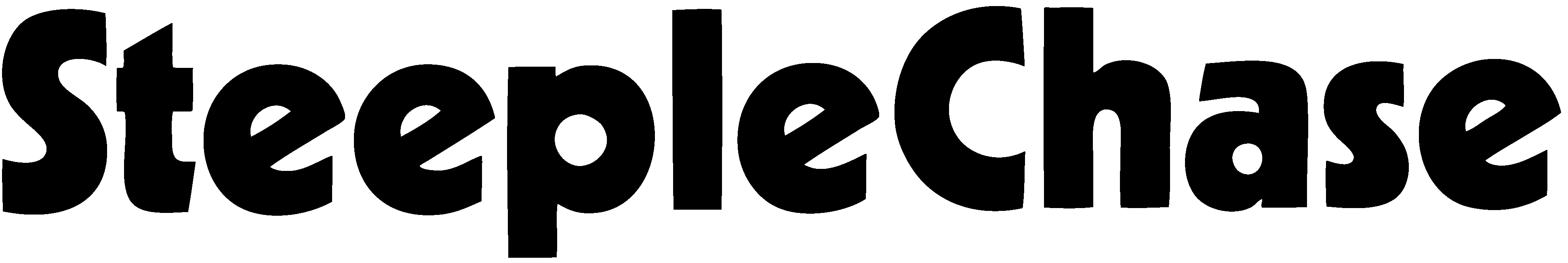
- Founded: 1972
- Founder: Nils Winther
- Genre: Jazz
- Country of origin: Denmark
- Location: Copenhagen
- Official website: steeplechase.dk

SteepleChase Records is a jazz record company and label based in Copenhagen, Denmark. SteepleChase was founded in 1972 by Nils Winther, who was a student at Copenhagen University at the time. He began recording concerts at Jazzhus Montmartre, where many American musicians performed, and was given permission by some of the artists to release the material commercially.

SteepleChase became a haven for many artists who were without contracts with larger labels at the time. In 1987, the company started a subsidiary classical music label, Kontrapunkt.

== Discography ==
=== 1000/31000 Series ===
The main series of albums released on the SteepleChase label beginning in 1972 had catalog numbers starting at SCS 1001. When compact discs were introduced in the late 1980s, catalog numbers added a 3 before the 1000 series number.

Title	Artist	Year released	Catalogue No. SCS/SCCD3	Notes
Live at Montmartre	Jackie McLean	1972	1001	Recorded live in Copenhagen, August 1972
Duo	Kenny Drew and Niels-Henning Ørsted Pedersen	1973	1002	
Birdtown Birds	Joe Albany	1973	1003	
Blues for Harvey	Johnny Griffin	1973	1004	
Paul Bley/NHØP	Paul Bley and Niels-Henning Ørsted Pedersen	1973	1005	
The Meeting	Jackie McLean & Dexter Gordon	1974	1006	
Everything I Love	Kenny Drew	1974	1007	
My Man: Live at Montmartre 1973	Ben Webster	1974	1008	
Ode to Super	Jackie McLean featuring Gary Bartz	1974	1009	
Duo 2	Kenny Drew and Niels-Henning Ørsted Pedersen	1974	1010	
Flight to Denmark	Duke Jordan	1974	1011	
Arrival	Horace Parlan	1974	1012	
A Ghetto Lullaby	Jackie McLean	1974	1013	
Hindsight	Ken McIntyre	1974	1014	
In the Tradition	Anthony Braxton	1974	1015	
Dark Beauty	Kenny Drew	1974	1016	
Catalonian Fire	Tete Montoliu	1974	1017	
I Concentrate on You: A Tribute to Cole Porter	Lee Konitz and Red Mitchell	1974	1018	
Two's Company	Joe Albany and Niels-Henning Ørsted Pedersen	1974	1019	
The Source	Jackie McLean & Dexter Gordon	1974	1020	
Music for Perla	Tete Montoliu	1974	1021	
Perception	Connie Crothers Trio	1974	1022	
New York Calling	Jackie McLean and The Cosmic Brotherhood	1974	1023	
Two Loves	Duke Jordan	1975	1024	
The Apartment	Dexter Gordon	1975	1025	
Invitation	Andrew Hill	1975	1026	
When Destiny Calls	Billy Gault	1975	1027	
Antiquity	Jackie McLean and Michael Carvin	1975	1028	
Tete!	Tete Montoliu	1975	1029	
More Than You Know	Dexter Gordon and Orchestra arranged and conducted by Palle Mikkelborg	1975	1030	
Duo Live in Concert	Kenny Drew and Niels-Henning Ørsted Pedersen	1975	1031	
Visitor	Coronarias Dans	1975	1032	
Firm Roots	Clifford Jordan and the Magic Triangle	1975	1033	
If You Could See Me Now	Kenny Drew	1975	1034	
Lone-Lee	Lee Konitz	1975	1035	
Piano Man	Hilton Ruiz	1975	1036	
Watch Out	René McLean	1975	1037	
The Camel	Michael Carvin	1975	1038	
Home	Ken McIntyre	1975	1039	
Stable Mable	Dexter Gordon Quartet	1976	1040	
Jaywalkin'	Niels-Henning Ørsted Pedersen	1976	1041	
Peace	Walt Dickerson Trio	1976	1042	
Free Spirits	Mary Lou Williams Trio	1976	1043	
Divine Revelation	Andrew Hill	1976	1044	
In the Tradition Volume 2	Anthony Braxton	1976	1045	
Duke's Delight	Duke Jordan	1976	1046	
The Highest Mountain	Clifford Jordan and the Magic Triangle	1976	1047	
Morning	Kenny Drew Trio	1976	1048	
Open Horizon	Ken McIntyre	1976	1049	
Swiss Nights Vol. 1	Dexter Gordon Quartet	1976	1050	
Call for the Fiddler	Claude Williams	1976	1051	
Now Is the Time	Idrees Sulieman	1976	1052	
Misty Thursday	Duke Jordan Quartet	1976	1053	
Tête à Tete	Tete Montoliu	1976	1054	
Double Bass	Niels-Henning Ørsted Pedersen and Sam Jones	1976	1055	
No Blues	Horace Parlan Trio	1976	1056	
Windows	Lee Konitz and Hal Galper	1976	1057	
Swingin' Till the Girls Come Home	Eddie "Lockjaw" Davis	1976	1058	
Don't Look Back	Nat Adderley Septet	1976	1059	
Bouncin' with Dex	Dexter Gordon Quartet	1977	1060	
Cunningbird	Jimmy Knepper Quintet	1977	1061	
Time for a Change	Monnette Sudler Quartet/Quintet	1977	1062	
Live in Japan	Duke Jordan	1977	1063/64	
Live in Japan vol. 1	Duke Jordan	1977	31063	
Live in Japan vol. 2	Duke Jordan	1977	31064	
Introducing the Vibrations	Ken McIntyre	1977	1065	
Remember Me	Frank Strozier	1977	1066	
Reach Out!	Hal Galper Quintet	1977	1067	
Pictures	Niels-Henning Ørsted Pedersen and Kenneth Knudsen	1977	1068	
Onaje	Onaje Allan Gumbs	1977	1069	
Serendipity	Walt Dickerson Trio	1977	1070	
On Stage Vol. 1	Clifford Jordan and The Magic Triangle	1977	1071	
Jazz à Juan	Lee Konitz Quartet	1977	1072	
Live at Montmartre	Stan Getz	1977	1073/74	
Live at Montmartre vol. 1	Stan Getz	1977	31073	
Live at Montmartre vol. 2	Stan Getz	1977	31074	
Real Tchicai	John Tchicai Trio	1977	1075	
Frank-ly Speaking	Horace Parlan Quintet	1977	1076	
Lite Flite	Kenny Drew Quintet	1977	1077	
Excition	Hilton Ruiz	1977	1078	
Goin' Home	Archie Shepp and Horace Parlan	1977	1079	
Biting the Apple	Dexter Gordon	1977	1080	
Sheila	Sheila Jordan and Arild Andersen	1978	1081	
Introducing Doug Raney	Doug Raney	1978	1082	
Trio 1: Live at Montmartre	Niels-Henning Ørsted Pedersen Trio	1978	1083	
Words of Love	Tete Montoliu	1978	1084	
First Set	Cedar Walton Quartet	1978	1085	
Another World	Andy LaVerne Trio	1978	1086	
Brighter Days for You	Monnette Sudler	1978	1087	
Flight to Japan	Duke Jordan Trio	1978	1088	
Divine Gemini	Walt Dickerson and Richard Davis	1978	1089	
Swiss Nights Vol. 2	Dexter Gordon	1978	1090	
Witches, Goblins, etc.	Sadik Hakim	1978	1091	
On Stage Vol. 2	Clifford Jordan and The Magic Triangle	1978	1092	
Trio 2	Niels-Henning Ørsted Pedersen	1978	1093	
New York Hilton	Hilton Ruiz Trio	1978	1094	
This Is Buck Hill	Buck Hill Quartet	1978	1095	
Just Friends	Louis Smith Quintet	1978	1096	
Visitation	Sam Jones Quintet	1978	1097	
Witchdoctor's Son	Johnny Dyani with John Tchicai and Dudu Pukwana	1978	1098	
Embarkation	John McNeil Quintet	1978	1099	
No album identified			1100	
For Us	Mike Richmond and Andy LaVerne	1979	1101	
Live in Europe	Monnette Sudler Quartet	1979	1102	
Duke's Artistry	Duke Jordan Quartet	1979	1103	
On Stage Vol. 3	Clifford Jordan and The Magic Triangle	1979	1104	
Cuttin' Loose	Doug Raney Quintet	1979	1105	
In Concert	Kenny Drew	1979	1106	
That Old Feeling	Albert Dailey Trio	1979	1107	
Tootie's Tempo	Tete Montoliu	1979	1108	
Song for Biko	Johnny Dyani Quartet	1979	1109	
Swiss Nights Vol. 3	Dexter Gordon	1979	1110	
A Lazy Afternoon	Shirley Horn Trio	1979	1111	
To My Queen Revisited	Walt Dickerson	1979	1112	
Second Set	Cedar Walton Quartet	1979	1113	
Chasing the Sun	Ken McIntyre Trio	1979	1114	
Landscape with Open Door	Pierre Dørge and Walt Dickerson	1979	1115	
Parade	Joe Bonner Trio	1978	1116	
Faun	John McNeil Quintet	1979	1117	
Stolen Moments	Jimmy Raney and Doug Raney	1979	1118	
Yes, Yes, Nonet	Lee Konitz Nonet	1979	1119	
Pour Django	Boulou Ferré and Elios Ferré	1979	1120	
Prancin'	Louis Smith Quintet	1979	1121	
The Touch of Your Lips	Chet Baker	1979	1122	
Scope	Buck Hill Quartet	1979	1123	
Blue Parlan	Horace Parlan	1979	1124	
Dancing on the Tables	Niels-Henning Ørsted Pedersen	1979	1125	
Visions	Walt Dickerson and Sun Ra	1979	1126	
Lover Man	Duke Jordan	1979	1127	
Look to the Sky	John McNeil and Tom Harrell	1979	1128	
Ruby My Dear	Kenny Drew	1980	1129	
To My Son	Walt Dickerson Trio	1980	1130	
No Problem	Chet Baker & Duke Jordan Quartet	1980	1131	
Ballad Round the Left Corner	Pierre Dørge Quartet	1980	1132	
The Glass Room	John McNeil Quartet	1980	1133	
Duets	Jimmy Raney and Doug Raney	1980	1134	
Change a Pace	Duke Jordan Trio	1980	1135	
Something Different	Dexter Gordon	1980	1136	
I Wanna Talk About You	Tete Montoliu	1980	1137	
Paths Beyond Tracing	David Friesen	1980	1138	
Trouble in Mind	Archie Shepp and Horace Parlan	1980	1139	
Gypsy Dreams	Boulou Ferré and Elios Ferré	1980	1140	
Musically Yours	Horace Parlan	1980	1141	
Daybreak	Chet Baker, Doug Raney, Niels-Henning Ørsted Pedersen	1980	1142	
Midnight Moonlight	Duke Jordan	1981	1143	
Listen	Doug Raney Quartet	1981	1144	
Strings & Things	Dexter Gordon	1981	1145	
I Hear You John	Walt Dickerson and Jimmi Johnsun	1981	1146	
Out of This World	Teddy Edwards	1981	1147	
Catalonian Nights Vol. 1	Tete Montoliu	1981	1148	
Looking at Bird	Archie Shepp and Niels-Henning Ørsted Pedersen	1981	1149	
The Great Session	Duke Jordan Trio	1981	1150	
Steps Up	Eddie Harris	1981	1151	
Boston Concert	Tete Montoliu	1981	1152/3	
Boston Concert vol. 1	Tete Montoliu	1981	31152	
Boston Concert vol. 2	Tete Montoliu	1981	31153	
Clean Sweep	John McNeil Quintet	1981	1154	
Permutations	Chuck Marohnic	1981	1155	
Lullaby for a Monster	Dexter Gordon	1981	1156	
All Night Long	Shirley Horn Trio	1981	1157	
Steppin' Into Beauty	Hilton Ruiz Trio/Quintet	1982	1158	
My One and Only Love	Michael Urbaniak Jazz Trio	1982	1159	
Easy to Love	Buck Hill Quartet	1982	1160	Recorded live at the North Sea Jazz Festival in 1981
Chocolate Cadillac	Red Mitchell Quintet	1982	1161	
Pierre Dørge & New Jungle Orchestra	Pierre Dørge and the New Jungle Orchestra	1982	1162	
Mbizo	Johnny Dyani Quartet	1982	1163	
Violets for Your Furs	Shirley Horn	1982	1164	
Thinking of You	Duke Jordan Trio	1982	1165	
I'll Close My Eyes	Doug Raney Quintet	1982	1166	
The Maestro	Horace Parlan	1982	1167	
This Is Always	Chet Baker, Doug Raney, Niels-Henning Ørsted Pedersen	1982	1168	
Mama Rose	Archie Shepp and Jasper van't Hof	1982	1169	
The House That Love Built	Frank Foster Quartet	1982	1170	
Trinity	Boulou Ferré, Niels-Henning Ørsted Pedersen and Elios Ferré	1983	1171	
In Europe	Jack Walrath Quintet	1983	1172	
Impressions	Buck Hill Quartet	1983	1173	Recorded live at the North Sea Jazz Festival in 1981
Ball at Louisiana Museum of Modern Art	John Tchicai and Pierre Dørge	1983	1174	
Truth	Duke Jordan Trio	1983	1175	
Suburban Fantasies	Joe Bonner and Johnny Dyani	1983	1176	
Surprise Party	Bernt Rosengren Quartet/Quintet	1983	1177	
Like Someone In Love	Horace Parlan Trio	1983	1178	
Third Set	Cedar Walton Quartet	1983	1179	
Someday My Prince Will Come	Chet Baker, Doug Raney, Niels-Henning Ørsted Pedersen	1983	1180	
All of Me	Eddie "Lockjaw" Davis Quartet	1983	1181	
Devotion	Joe Bonner	1983	1182	
I've Got the World on a String	John McNeil Trio/Quintet	1983	1183	
Nardis	Jimmy Raney and Doug Raney	1983	1184	
Face to Face	Tete Montoliu and Niels-Henning Ørsted Pedersen	1984	1185	
Afrika	Johnny Dyani	1984	1186	
A Quiet Day in Spring	Larry Coryell and Michal Urbaniak	1984	1187	
Brikama	Pierre Dørge and New Jungle Orchestra	1984	1188	
Tivoli One	Duke Jordan Trio	1984	1189	
Montreux	Ernie Wilkins' Almost Big Band	1984	1190	
Blue and White	Doug Raney Quartet	1984	1191	
Nica's Dream	Red Holloway	1984	1192	
Tivoli Two	Duke Jordan Trio	1984	1193	
Glad I Found You	Horace Parlan Quintet	1984	1194	
Take Good Care of My Heart	Michal Urbaniak with Horace Parlan Trio	1984	1195	
Dark Warrior	Khan Jamal Quartet	1984	1196	
Three and One	Thad Jones Quartet	1985	1197	
Half Note	Clifford Jordan	1985	1198	
That's All	Tete Montoliu	1985	1199	
Lazy Bird	Doug Raney Quintet	1985	1200	
Three	Khan Jamal, Pierre Dørge and Johnny Dyani	1985	1201	
Bird's Grass	Idrees Sulieman Quintet	1985	1202	
The Garden of the Blues	Shirley Horn	1985	1203	
Just Be There	Howard McGhee Quintet	1985	1204	
Questions	Paul Bley Trio	1985	1205	
The Shadow of Your Smile	Dexter Gordon Quartet	1985	1206	
Diane	Chet Baker and Paul Bley	1985	1207	
Even the Moon Is Dancing	Pierre Dørge and New Jungle Orchestra	1985	1208	
Angolian Cry	Johnny Dyani Quartet	1985	1209	
Relax and Enjoy	Boulou Ferré Quartet	1985	1210	
Wait and See	Duke Jordan Trio	1985	1211	
Guitar Guitar Guitar	Doug Raney Trio	1985	1212	
Tenderness	Walt Dickerson and Richard Davis	1985	1213	
My Standard	Paul Bley	1986	1214	
Suite For Chocolate	Joe Bonner Quartet	1986	1215	
Lush Life	Tete Montoliu	1986	1216	
The Traveller	Khan Jamal	1986	1217	
Groovin'	Idrees Sulieman	1986	1218	
No Rush	Bob Rockwell Quartet	1987	1219	
Open Air	Tom Harrell Quintet	1987	1220	
When Sunny Gets Blue	Chet Baker	1987	1221	
Nuages	Boulou Ferré Trio	1987	1222	
Live	Paul Bley and Jesper Lundgaard	1987	1223	
After Hours	Dexter Gordon Quintet	1987	1224	
On the Roll	Ernie Wilkins Almost Big Band	1987	1225	
After Midnight	Dexter Gordon	1987	1226	
The Lost Melody	Joe Bonner Quartet	1987	1227	
Johnny Lives	Pierre Dørge and New Jungle Orchestra	1987	1228	
On the Natch	Bob Rockwell Quartet	1987	1229	
Live Again	Paul Bley and Jesper Lundgaard	1987	1230	
Things We Did Last Summer	John McNeil	1987	1231	
Time On My Hands	Duke Jordan Trio	1988	1232	
Red Giant	Red Rodney Quartet	1988	1233	
Monsoon	Gary Bartz Quartet	1988	1234	
Something's Up	Doug Raney	1988	1235	
Solo Piano	Paul Bley	1988	1236	
On the Edge	Larry Schneider, Adam Nussbaum and Mike Richmond	1988	1237	
One for Bird	Red Rodney Quintet	1988	1238	
New Life	Joe Bonner Trio	1988	1239	
The Place to Be	Junior Cook Quartet	1988	1240	
Catalonian Nights Vol. 2	Tete Montoliu Trio	1988	1241	
Confirmation	Boulou Ferré Quartet	1989	1243	
Frozen Music	Andy LaVerne Quartet	1989	1244	
Light and Lively	Louis Hayes Quintet	1989	1245	
The Nearness of You	Paul Bley	1989	1246	
As Time Goes By	Duke Jordan Trio	1989	1247	
Reflections of Monk: The Final Frontier	Gary Bartz	1989	1248	
The Doug Raney Quintet	Doug Raney Quintet	1989	1249	
Phantoms	Eddie Henderson Quintet	1989	1250	
Just in Time	Larry Willis Trio	1989	1251	
Red Snapper	Red Rodney Quintet	1989	1252	
Sienna	Stanley Cowell Trio	1989	1253	
What's Up	Bill Hardman Sextet	1989	1254	
Scorpio Rising	Walter Davis, Jr.	1990	1255	
Winds of Change	Jim McNeely	1990	1256	
Present Tense	Joe Locke	1990	1257	
Blues in Five Dimensions	Mickey Tucker	1990	1258	
BeBop	Paul Bley Trio	1990	1259	
Destiny Is Yours	Billy Harper Quintet	1990	1260	
Fountainhead	Andy LaVerne and Dave Samuels	1990	31261	
McJolt	Ron McClure Quartet	1990	31262	
Una Max	Louis Hayes	1990	31263	
Think On Me	Eddie Henderson Quintet	1990	31264	
You Stepped Out of a Dream	Ben Besiakov Trio	1990	31265	
On a Misty Night	Junior Cook Quartet	1990	31266	
Dance for Andy	Mike Richmond	1990	31267	
Ballads for Lulu	Louis Smith	1990	31268	
Heavy Blue	Larry Willis Quintet	1990	31269	
Reconstruction	Bob Rockwell	1990	31270	
Osaka Concert Vol. 1	Duke Jordan	1990	31271	
Osaka Concert Vol. 2	Duke Jordan	1990	31272	
Severe Clear	Andy LaVerne	1990	31273	
Rejoicing	Paul Bley	1990	31274	
Departure #2	Stanley Cowell	1990	31275	
In Search of Hope	Bertha Hope	1990	31276	
Strike Zone	Dave Stryker	1990	31277	
Songbird	Michal Urbaniak	1991	31278	
Never Forget	Ron McClure	1991	31279	
Standard Eyes	Andy LaVerne	1991	31280	
Longing	Joe Locke Quintet with Mark Ledford	1991	31281	
SweetEar	Kevin Hays Quintet	1991	31282	
Let's Play	Larry Willis Trio	1991	31283	
Flight of Mind	Eddie Henderson Quartet	1991	31284	
Nightfall	Louis Hayes	1991	31285	
Indian Summer	Paul Bley	1991	31286	
Cables Fables	George Cables Trio	1991	31287	
Tonite Only	Ron McClure Quartet	1991	31288	
Elmo's Fire	Bertha Hope	1991	31289	
Round Midnight	Dexter Gordon/Benny Bailey Quintet	1991	31290	
Just Cole Porter	Larry Schneider Quartet	1991	31291	
You've Changed	Jimmy Heath Quartet	1991	31292	
Games	Stanley Cowell Trio	1991	31293	
Strike Up The Band	Louis Smith	1991	31294	
But Beautiful	Joe Locke & Kenny Barron	1991	31295	
Blue in Green	Mike Richmond	1992	31296	
Ugly Beauty	Kevin Hays Trio	1992	31297	
Gentle Time Alone	Ted Dunbar	1992	31298	
Solo Masterpieces Vol. 1	Duke Jordan	1992	31299	
Solo Masterpieces Vol. 2	Duke Jordan	1992	31300	
Nosmo King	John Abercrombie and Andy LaVerne	1992	31301	
Hang in There	Mickey Tucker Sextet	1992	31302	
Paul Plays Carla	Paul Bley	1992	31303	
You Leave Me Breathless	Junior Cook	1992	31304	
Beyond Forever	George Cables Trio	1992	31305	
Sunburst	Ron McClure Sextet	1992	31306	
Bill Evans...Person We Knew	Larry Schneider and Andy LaVerne	1992	31307	
Coalescence	Jeff Williams Quintet	1992	31308	
Airplay	Ronnie Cuber Quartet	1992	31309	
Never Let Me Go	Von Freeman	1992	31310	
Live on Tour in the Far East	Billy Harper	1992	31311	
How Do You Keep the Music Playing?	Larry Willis	1992	31312	
New Horizon	Steve LaSpina	1992	31313	
Now It Can Be Played	John Abercrombie-Andy LaVerne Quartet	1993	31314	
Blue Degrees	Dave Stryker	1993	31315	
Caravan Suite	Paul Bley	1993	31316	
Blind Date	Larry Schneider	1993	31317	
Unforgettable: Piano Solos	Larry Willis	1993	31318	
Buy One Get One Free	Andy LaVerne	1993	31319	
Lester Leaps In	Von Freeman Quartet	1993	31320	
Live on Tour in the Far East Vol. 2	Billy Harper	1993	31321	
For You For Me For Evermore	Eddie Harris	1993	31322	
The Steve Slagle Quartet	Steve Slagle Quartet	1993	31323	
Crossroad	Kevin Hays Quintet	1993	31324	
Universal Mind	Richie Beirach and Andy LaVerne	1993	31325	
Light Blue	Bob Rockwell and Jesper Lundgaard	1993	31326	
Meditations	Kenny Werner	1993	31327	
Bright Passion	Stanley Cowell	1993	31328	
Inner Account	Ron McClure Quintet	1993	31329	
Passage	Dave Stryker Quintet	1993	31330	
To Start Again	Rich Perry	1993	31331	
Wire Walker	Joe Locke	1993	31332	
Born to Be Blue	Bob Rockwell Trio	1994	31333	
I Mean You	George Cables Trio	1994	31334	
Too Grand	Richie Beirach and Andy LaVerne	1994	31335	
Silvering	Louis Smith Quintet	1994	31336	
Blues Holiday	Jodie Christian Trio	1994	31337	
Some Other Blues	Michal Urbaniak	1994	31338	
Angel Eyes	Stanley Cowell	1994	31339	
"Blue Lou"	Louis Hayes Sextet	1994	31340	
Blues on a Par	Doug Raney Quartet	1994	31341	
In the Mood for a Classic: Plays Bud Powell	Andy LaVerne	1994	31342	
Eclipse	Steve LaSpina	1994	31343	
If We May	Paul Bley Trio	1994	31344	
Full Moon	Dave Stryker Quintet	1994	31345	
Copenhagen Calypso	Kenny Werner	1994	31346	
Mohawk	Larry Schneider Quartet	1994	31347	
Paul Bley at Copenhagen Jazz House	Paul Bley	1994	31348	
Setup	Stanley Cowell Sextet	1994	31349	
Next Age	Harold Danko Quartet	1994	31350	
Dedicated to You	Von Freeman	1994	31351	
Glass Ceiling	Andy LaVerne Trio	1994	31352	
Night Tripper	Vic Juris	1994	31353	
Spread the Word	Steve Slagle Quartet	1995	31354	
Never Always	Ron McClure	1995	31355	
After the Rain	Harold Danko	1995	31356	
Quiet Fire	George Cables	1995	31357	
Work It	Rick Margitza	1995	31358	
Live at Copenhagen Jazz House	Stanley Cowell Trio	1995	31359	
Beautiful Love	Rich Perry	1995	31360	
The Very Thought of You	Louis Smith and Jodie Christian	1995	31361	
Stardust	Dave Stryker	1995	31362	
Speechless	Paul Bley Quartet	1995	31363	
Very Early	Joe Locke Trio	1995	31364	
Getting There	Mickey Tucker	1995	31365	
Live on Tour in the Far East Vol. 3	Billy Harper Quintet	1995	31366	
Reincarnation	Steve Slagle Quartet	1995	31367	
Almost Everything	Don Friedman Trio	1995	31368	
Person to Person	George Cables	1995	31369	
You or Me	Jimmy Heath Quartet	1995	31370	
Nomad	Dave Stryker with the Bill Warfield Big Band	1995	31371	
In a New York Minute	Ronnie Cuber Quartet	1995	31372	
Revelation	Dexter Gordon / Benny Bailey Quintet	1995	31373	
What Is This?	Rich Perry	1995	31374	
Tadd's Delight	Andy LaVerne	1995	31375	
When I'm Alone	Steve LaSpina	1995	31376	
New Autumn	Harold Danko Quartet	1996	31377	
Shades of Blue	Bob Rockwell Quartet	1996	31378	
Reality Check	Paul Bley	1996	31379	
Inner Space	Joe Locke Quartet	1996	31380	
Skylark	George Cables Trio	1996	31381	
Activism	George Colligan Trio	1996	31382	
Sleight of Hand	Jed Levy Quartet	1996	31383	
Pastels	Vic Juris	1996	31384	
I Waited for You	Louis Smith	1996	31385	
Mandara Blossoms	Stanley Cowell	1996	31386	
The Greeting	Dave Stryker Quintet	1996	31387	
Serenade to Silver	Andy LaVerne	1996	31388	
Set 'em Up	Tony Purrone	1996	31389	
Freedom Jazz Dance	Larry Schneider	1996	31390	
Concrete Canyon	Ron McClure	1996	31391	
The Feeling of Jazz	Harold Danko Quartet	1996	31392	
Where Is Love?	Karen Francis	1996	31393	
N. Y. C.ats	Ronnie Cuber	1996	31394	
The Irish Connection Trio	Keith Copeland	1996	31395	
Story Time	Steve LaSpina	1996	31396	
Raney '96	Doug Raney Quartet	1996	31397	
It's You	Lee Konitz	1996	31398	
Bud's Beautiful	Andy LaVerne Trio	1996	31399	
Blue to the Bone	Dave Stryker	1996	31400	
Get Out of Town	Richard Wyands Trio	1997	31401	
Moonscape	Vic Juris Quartet	1997	31402	
My Romance: Solo Piano	Don Friedman	1997	31403	
New York, N.Y.	Boulou Ferré and Elios Ferré	1997	31404	
Dark Side, Light Side	George Cables Trio	1997	31405	
Dearly Beloved	Lee Konitz	1997	31406	
Hear Me One	Stanley Cowell	1997	31407	
Copenhagen Suite	Chuck Marohnic Quartet	1997	31408	
Back in New York	Doug Raney Quartet	1997	31409	
In the Heath Zone	Tony Purrone	1997	31410	
Tidal Breeze	Harold Danko	1997	31411	
Rain's Dance	Jim McNeely Quintet	1997	31412	
Closer to Your Tears	Ron McClure Quintet	1997	31413	
The Newcomer	George Colligan	1997	31414	
There Goes My Heart	Louis Smith	1997	31415	
Alto Blue	Steve Slagle Quartet	1997	31416	
Hi-Fly	Horace Parlan	1997	31417	
Stan Getz in Chappaqua	Andy LaVerne Quartet	1997	31418	
When Children Smile	Steve LaSpina Quintet	1997	31419	
What's Goin' On	Frank Strozier Quintet	1997	31420	
Left Alone	Rich Perry	1997	31421	
All of Three	Dick Oatts	1997	31422	
Ice Scape	Reuben Brown	1997	31423	
Shades of Love	Walt Dickerson	1997	31424	
Round Trip	Keith Copeland	1997	31425	
Big Room	Dave Stryker Quartet	1997	31426	
Out of Nowhere	Lee Konitz and Paul Bley	1997	31427	
D's Mood	Danny Walsh Quintet	1997	31428	
Ali Girl	Larry Schneider Quartet	1997	31429	
Cutting Edge	Michael Cochrane Quartet	1997	31430	
Little Sunflower	Karen Francis	1998	31431	
Now and Zen	LeeAnn Ledgerwood	1998	31432	
Catalonian Nights Vol. 3	Tete Montoliu	1998	31433	
Bluesology	George Cables Trio	1998	31434	
Dream Team	Ron McClure	1998	31435	
Amongst Ourselves	Dave Ballou	1998	31436	
Notes on Ornette	Paul Bley	1998	31437	
Six-String Delight	Tony Purrone	1998	31438	
Standard Issue	Dick Oatts	1998	31439	
RichLee!	Lee Konitz and Rich Perry	1998	31440	
Stomping Ground	George Colligan Trio	1998	31441	
Soon	Louis Smith	1998	31442	
This Place	Scott Colley	1998	31443	
Three of Four	Harold Danko Trio	1998	31444	
Blue and Brown	Reuben Brown	1998	31445	
Plays Monk	Steve Slagle	1998	31446	
So in Love	Rich Perry	1998	31447	
Distant Dream	Steve LaSpina Quintet	1998	31448	
Milestones	Michael Weiss	1998	31449	
Introducing Ari Ambrose	Ari Ambrose	1998	31450	
Stable Mates	Harold Danko Quartet	1998	31451	
The Tender Side of Sammy Straighthorn	Sam Newsome	1999	31452	
Remembering Eric Dolphy	Vic Juris	1999	31453	
Ask Me Now	Michal Urbaniak	1999	31454	
All the Way	Dave Stryker	1999	31455	
The Backbeat	Doug Raney	1999	31456	
Another World, Another Time	Andy LaVerne	1999	31457	
Simone's Dance	Dick Oatts	1999	31458	
Gesture of Faith	Michael Cochrane Trio	1999	31459	
Volition	Dave Ballou	1999	31460	
Ornettology	Larry Schneider	1999	31461	
Constant Source	George Colligan	1999	31462	
Cancoes do Brasil	Rich Perry and Harold Danko	1999	31463	
Once in a While	Louis Smith	1999	31464	
Blue to the Bone II	Dave Stryker	1999	31465	
Dig-It	Lee Konitz and Ted Brown	1999	31466	
Embrace	Elisabeth Kontomanou	1999	31467	
Transition	LeeAnn Ledgerwood	1999	31468	
Live in Limerick	Keith Copeland	1999	31469	
Small Room	George Colligan	1999	31470	
This Isn't Maybe	Harold Danko	1999	31471	
Cyclic Episode	Ari Ambrose	1999	31472	
Doxy	Rich Perry	1999	31473	
You Go to My Head	Doug Raney	1999	31474	
Temperament	Tony Purrone	1999	31475	
Footprints	Michael Cochrane	2000	31476	
Compassion	LeeAnn Ledgerwood	2000	31477	
Between Earth & Mars	Andy LaVerne	2000	31478	
Pride	Lee Konitz	2000	31479	
Shades of Miles	Dave Stryker	2000	31480	
Chainsaw	Ari Ambrose	2000	31481	
Standard Issue Volume 2	Dick Oatts	2000	31482	
Songbook	Vic Juris	2000	31483	
Hands & Incantation	Elisabeth Kontomanou	2000	31484	
Twins	George Colligan and Jesper Bodilsen	2000	31485	
The Floating World	Dave Ballou	2000	31486	
One for My Baby	George Cables	2000	31487	
Between the Lines	Marc Copland and Tim Hagans	2000	31488	
The Bopsmith	Louis Smith	2000	31489	
Night Scapes	Harold Danko Quartet	2000	31490	
Toy Trumpet	Brad Goode	2000	31491	
O Grande Amor	Rich Perry	2000	31492	
Know More	Andy LaVerne	2000	31493	
Minor Matrix	Michael Cochrane	2000	31494	
The Tonester	Tony Purrone	2000	31495	
Early Song	Ari Ambrose	2000	31496	
Paradox	LeeAnn Ledgerwood	2000	31497	
Agent 99	George Colligan	2000	31498	
Fortuity	John McNeil	2000	31499	
Inside Chicago Vol. 1	Von Freeman	2001	31500	
Inside Chicago Vol. 2	Von Freeman	2001	31501	
The Bounce	Steve LaSpina	2001	31502	
This Masquerade	Sam Newsome	2001	31503	
On This Day	Dave Ballou	2001	31504	
Jazz	Larry Schneider	2001	31505	
By Myself	Brad Goode	2001	31506	
A Wish	George Colligan	2001	31507	
Prestigious	Harold Danko	2001	31508	
Double Play	Marc Copland and Vic Juris	2001	31509	
Changing Times	Dave Stryker	2002	31510	
South Paw	Dick Oatts	2002	31511	
Pianissimo	Andy LaVerne	2002	31512	
Quartet Music	Michael Cochrane	2002	31513	
Rascality	Tony Purrone	2002	31514	
Hearsay	Rich Perry	2002	31515	
Songbook 2	Vic Juris	2002	31516	
Match Point	Ron McClure	2002	31517	
United	Ari Ambrose	2002	31518	
Return to Copenhagen	George Colligan	2002	31519	
Shades of Light	Conrad Herwig and Andy LaVerne	2002	31520	
The Rainbow People	Dexter Gordon and Benny Bailey	2002	31521	
Jam Session Vol. 1	Larry Schneider, Rick Margitza, Chris Potter	2002	31522	
Jam Session Vol. 2	Vic Juris, Dave Stryker, Tony Purrone	2002	31523	
Blue to the Bone III	Dave Stryker	2002	31524	
Rothko	Dave Ballou	2002	31525	
Jam Session Vol. 3	Dick Oatts, Don Braden, Vincent Herring	2002	31526	
Jam Session Vol. 4	Ingrid Jensen, Mark Tuner and Sam Newsome	2002	31527	
Gong with Wind Suite	Lee Konitz and Matt Wilson	2002	31528	
Round and Round	Jed Levy	2002	31529	
Fantasy Exit	Harold Danko	2003	31530	
Inside Chicago Vol. 3	Von Freeman	2003	31531	
Inside Chicago Vol. 4	Von Freeman	2003	31532	
At Eastman	Rich Perry	2003	31533	
My Foolish Heart	Don Friedman	2003	31534	
Jazmin	Ari Ambrose	2003	31535	
Jam Session Vol. 5	Scott Wendholt, Dave Balliou, Greg Gisbert	2003	31536	
Jam Session Vol. 6	Alex Norris, Ari Ambrose, Joel Frahm	2003	31537	
Timelines	John Abercrombie and Andy LaVerne	2003	31538	
Preservation	Ted Brown	2003	31539	
Remember When	Steve LaSpina	2003	31540	
Walkin' Up	LeeAnn Ledgerwood	2003	31541	
Pathways	Michael Cochrane	2003	31542	
Flight to Norway	Duke Jordan	2003	31543	
Age of Peace	Ron McClure	2003	31544	
Major Incident	Joshua Douglas Smith	2003	31545	
Jam Session Vol. 7	Louis Smith, Mark Turner and Billy Mitchell	2003	31546	
Jam Session Vol. 8	Ryan Kisor, Jimmy Greene and Jim Pugh	2003	31547	
Current State	Martin Jacobsen	2003	31548	
It Might As Well Be Spring	Larry Schneider	2003	31549	
Guitarisk	Tony Purrone	2004	31550	
Trilix	Harold Danko	2004	31551	
Louisville	Louis Smith	2004	31552	
While My Guitar Gently Weeps	Vic Juris	2004	31553	
Jam Session Vol. 9	Mark Turner, Don Braden, Jimmy Greene	2004	31554	
Jam Session Vol. 10	Doug Raney, Dave Stryker, Freddie Bryant	2004	31555	
Dancing Foot	Dave Ballou	2004	31556	
Venus Perplexed	Steve Lampert	2004	31557	
East of the Sun and West of 2nd Avenue	Rich Perry	2004	31558	
Shades Beyond	Dave Stryker	2004	31559	
Waiting	Ari Ambrose	2004	31560	
Song For Amy	Dave Scott	2004	31561	
Blue Function	Christian Winther	2004	31562	
Intuition	Jerry Bergonzi	2004	31563	
Unstuck in Time	Joshua Douglas Smith	2004	31564	
A New Abode	Sila Cevikce	2004	31565	
Jam Session Vol. 11	Charles Sullivan, Conrad Herwig, Gary Smulyan and Steve Slagle	2004	31566	
Jam Session Vol. 12	Rich Perry, Larry Schneider, Igor Butman	2004	31567	
Hinesight	Harold Danko	2004	31568	
All Ways	Andy LaVerne	2005	31569	
Live at Cobi's	Bill Barron	2005	31570	
A Nice Idea	John Abercrombie and Andy LaVerne	2005	31571	
Time and Again	Gary Versace	2005	31572	
Regards	Dave Ballou	2005	31573	
Jam Session Vol. 13	Dick Oatts, Joe Gordon, Billy Drewes	2005	31574	
Jam Session Vol. 14	Mark Turner, Ari Ambrose, Gregory Tardy	2005	31575	
You're My Everything	Rich Perry	2005	31576	
Get Together	Tom Guarna	2005	31577	
Peter Zak Trio	Peter Zak	2005	31578	
Mood Ellington	Jed Levy	2005	31579	
Elbow Room	Vincent Gardner	2005	31580	
Jam Session Vol. 15	Loren Stillman, Chris Byars, Kris Allen	2005	31581	
Jam Session Vol. 16	Ron McClure, Jay Anderson, Steve LaSpina	2005	31582	
The Truth	Gregory Tardy	2005	31583	
Inside Out	Stephen Riley	2005	31584	
The Only Plan	Christian Winther	2005	31585	
The Brothers' Breakfast	Loren Stillman	2006	31586	
On Another Day	Ari Ambrose	2006	31587	
Oatts & Perry	Harold Danko Quintet	2006	31588	
Many Places	Gary Versace	2006	31589	
Play Room	Steve LaSpina	2006	31590	
Incubation	Tony Purrone	2006	31591	
For Tomorrow	Peter Zak	2006	31592	
Jam Session Vol. 17	Ryan Kisor, John McNeil, Brad Goode	2006	31593	
Jam Session Vol. 18	Dick Oatts, Billy Drewes, Walt Weiskopf	2006	31594	
Rhapsody	Rich Perry	2006	31595	
Live at Cobi's 2	Bill Barron	2006	31596	
Peace in the Abstract	Marcus Printup	2006	31597	
Shadow Forms	Andrew Rathbun	2006	31598	
Organic-Lee	Lee Konitz and Gary Versace	2006	31599	
At the Kitano 1	Rich Perry	2006	31600	
Jam Session Vol. 19	Rich Perry, Rick Margitza, Joshua Douglas Smith	2006	31601	
Jam Session Vol. 20	Vincent Gardner, Andre Hayward, Danny Kirkhum, Richard Doron Johnson	2006	31602	
Secrets	Kim Bock	2006	31603	
Trio Alto Volume One	Loren Stillman	2006	331604	
Time to Dream	Andy LaVerne	2006	31605	
Gateway	Jed Levy	2006	31606	
Out from the Underground	Tom Guarna	2006	31607	
Naiveté	Dave Scott	2007	31608	
Easy to Remember	Stephen Riley	2007	31609	
Steps of Faith	Gregory Tardy	2007	31610	
Insistence	Dave Ballou	2007	31611	
Times Remembered	Harold Danko	2007	31612	
Jam Session Vol. 21	Gregory Tardy, Wayne Escoffery, Christian Winther	2007	31613	
Jam Session Vol. 22	Dave Ballou, Greg Gisbert, Tim Hagans	2007	31614	
Soft Hands	Ron McClure	2007	31615	
The Good Book Chapter 1	Vincent Gardner	2007	31616	
Whatever Happens	Ari Ambrose	2007	31617	
Intelligent Design	Andy LaVerne	2007	31618	
My Conception	Peter Zak	2007	31619	
E-motion	Rich Perry	2007	31620	
Trio Alto Volume 2	Loren Stillman	2007	31621	
Chimera	Russ Spiegel	2007	31622	
School of Tristano	Eric Rasmussen	2007	31623	
Jam Session Vol. 23	Conrad Herwig, Wycliffe Gordon and Vincent Gardner	2007	31624	
Jam Session Vol. 24	Jon Gordon, Rich Perry, Dave Schnitter	2007	31625	
Bird of Paradise	Marcus Printup	2007	31626	
Right Now	Michael Cochrane	2007	31627	
Shades of Brown	Ted Brown	2007	31628	
Staines Glass	Bill Gerhardt	2007	31629	
Affairs of State	Andrew Rathbun	2007	31630	
Reminiscence	Gary Versace	2007	31631	
Once Upon a Dream	Stephen Riley	2007	31632	
Soulhouse	Christian Winther	2008	31633	
Wingspan	Tom Guarna	2008	31634	
Breeze	Eliot Zigmund	2008	31635	
Jazz Is Like a Banana	Pierre Dørge & New Jungle Orchestra	2008	31636	
Strike Up the Band	Dave Stryker	2008	31637	
Wonderland	Harold Danko and Ron McClure	2008	31638	
Jam Session Vol. 25	Marcus Printup, Ryan Kisor, and Joe Magnarelli	2008	31639	
Jam Session Vol. 26	Conrad Herwig, Ed Xiques and Jay Brandford	2008	31640	
Seed of Sin	Peter Zak	2008	31641	
Moments	Steve LaSpina	2008	31642	
Thrive	Bill Gerhardt	2008	31643	
At the Kitano 2	Rich Perry	2008	31644	
School of Tristano 2	Eric Rasmussen	2008	31645	
Vin-Slidin'	Vincent Gardner	2008	31646	
He Knows My Name	Gregory Tardy	2008	31647	
Evans Explorations	Jed Levy	2008	31648	
Our Thought	Scott Lee	2008	31649	
Ballroom	Jack Walrath	2008	31650	
Happy House	Makaya Ntshoko	2008	31651	
Whispering Elephants	Pierre Dørge	2008	31652	
Gratitude	Dick Oatts	2008	31653	
At the Kitano Vol. 1	Rich Perry	2009	31654	
Marcus Printup	London Lullaby	2009	31655	
Tenor Treats	Ari Ambrose and Stephen Riley	2009	31656	
Major Minor	Tom Guarna	2009	31657	
Saxology	Dick Oatts and Jerry Bergonzi	2009	31658	
Jam Session Vol. 27	Tim Ries, Danny Walsh, Charles Pillow	2008	31659	
Jam Session Vol. 28	Conrad Herwig, Rich Perry, Steve Davis	2008	31660	
All That I Have	Bill Gerhardt	2008	31661	
Blue Lights	Chris Byars	2008	31662	
School of Tristano 3	Eric Rasmussen	2008	31663	
Nonchelant	Dave Scott	2008	31664	
Where We Are Now	Andrew Rathbun	2008	31665	
Impressions of Coltrane	Khan Jamal	2009	31666	
Live in Copenhagen	Kim Bock	2009	31667	
Talk of the Town	Ari Ambrose	2009	31668	
One Night tt the Kitano	Jed Levy	2009	31669	
Gone	Rich Perry	2009	31670	
Three-Five	Vincent Gardner	2009	31671	
Blues at the Corner	Peter Zak	2009	31672	
New Moon	Ron McClure	2009	31673	
Escapades	Harold Danko	2009	31674	
In Monk's Mood	John Tchicai	2009	31675	
Tenor Treats 2	Ari Ambrose and Stephen Riley	2009	31676	
Mockingbird	Jesse Stacken & Kirk Knuffke	2009	31677	
Upside	Brian Charette	2009	31678	
One for Reedus	Dave Stryker	2009	31679	
Ronnie	Ronnie Cuber	2009	31680	
Ballads – All Night	Marcus Printup	2009	31681	
El Gaucho	Stephen Riley	2009	31682	
Heavy Mirth	Jack Walrath	2009	31683	
Mays at the Movies	Bill Mays	2009	31684	
Jam Session Vol. 29	Jim Snidero, Dave Pietro, and Mike DiRubbo	2010	31685	
Bop-ography	Chris Byars	2010	31686	
Leaving	Scott Lee	2010	31687	
Battle Grounds	Richard Johnson	2010	31688	
Oatts & Perry II	Harold Danko	2010	31689	
The Decider	Peter Zak	2010	31690	
Momentum	Bill Gerhardt	2010	31691	
Isolation	George Colligan	2010	31692	
At The Royal Playhouse	Pierre Dørge	2010	31693	
Two Hearts	Dick Oatts	2010	31694	
The Idea of North	Andrew Rathbun	2010	31695	
Omega Is the Alpha	Vic Juris	2010	31696	
At the Kitano 3	Rich Perry	2010	31697	
The Strongest Love	Gregory Tardy	2010	31698	
Nothing to Hide	Jason Palmer	2010	31699	
Jam Session Vol. 30	Wayne Escoffery, Jimmy Greene, Stephen Riley, Don Braden	2010	31700	
Presents	Pierre Dørge	2010	31701	
Keystone	Dave Stryker	2010	31702	
Little Green Men	Michael Pinto	2010	31703	
Prayer for Peace	Stanley Cowell	2010	31704	
Simple Truth	LeeAnn Ledgerwood	2010	31705	
Live from New York	Andy LaVerne and John Abercrombie	2010	31706	
Sixty-Eight	Billy Hart	2011	31707	
(Re)Conception	Helen Sung	2011	31708	
Flow	Kim Bock	2011	31709	
Learning to Count	Brian Charette	2011	31710	
A Time for Love	Marcus Printup	2011	31711	
Lucky Seven	Stephen Riley	2011	31712	
Lucky Strikes Again	Chris Byars	2011	31713	
Destiny	Steve LaSpina	2011	31714	
Down East	Peter Zak	2011	31715	
Let's Call Stephen Riley	GinmanBlachman!	2011	31716	
Orange was the Color	Kirk Knuffke and Jesse Stacken	2011	31717	
Dedication	Ron McClure	2011	31718	
The Good Book Chapter Two	Vincent Gardner	2011	31719	
Bittersweet	Tom Guarna	2011	31720	
From the Sound Up	Christian Winther	2011	31721	
Forsooth	Jack Walrath	2011	31722	
Listen Here	Vic Juris	2011	31723	
Here Today	Jason Palmer	2011	31724	
Monuments	Gregory Tardy	2011	31725	
Grace	Rich Perry	2011	31726	
Living for the City	George Colligan	2011	31727	
Sketches of India	Pierre Dørge & New Jungle Orchestra	2011	31728	
Blue Strike	Dave Stryker	2011	31729	
Homage	Marcus Printup	2011	31730	
Music for Organ Sextette	Brian Charette	2012	31731	
Breaking the Waves	LeeAnn Ledgerwood	2012	31732	
Having Fun	Olegario Diaz	2012	31733	
Boplicity	Ronnie Cuber	2012	31734	
Unriched	Harold Danko	2012	31735	
Crunch Time	Ron McClure	2012	31736	
Early Reflections	Niels Vincentz	2012	31737	
Lookin' Up	Dick Oatts	2012	31738	
Like a Tree	Kirk Knuffke and Jesse Stacken	2012	31739	
It's Time	Stanley Cowell	2012	31740	
The Good Book Chapter Three	Vincent Gardner	2012	31741	
Hart-Beat	Stephen Riley	2012	31742	
Music Forever	Chris Byars	2012	31743	
Nordic Noon	Peter Zak	2012	31744	
Rain	Jed Levy	2012	31745	
Free Admission	Vic Juris	2012	31746	
Advent[ure]	Craig Brann	2012	31747	
Time Was	Rich Perry	2012	31748	
Pound Cake	Kirk Knuffke and Ted Brown	2012	31749	
Take a Little Time	Jason Palmer	2012	31750	
Three's Not a Crowd	Andy LaVerne	2012	31751	
The Facts	George Colligan	2012	31752	
The Skyline Session	Olegario Diaz	2012	31753	
Standards & More	Gregory Tardy	2013	31754	
Blue to the Bone IV	Dave Stryker	2013	31755	
Borderline	Brian Charette	2013	31756	
Welcome to this New World	Stanley Cowell	2013	31757	
Carillon	Nate Radley	2013	31758	
Ready or Not	Ron McClure	2013	31759	
To Hellas and Back	Jack Walrath	2013	31760	
Oatts & Perry III	Harold Danko	2013	31761	
Shadow Forms II	Andrew Rathbun	2013	31762	
Desire	Marcus Printup	2013	31763	
Gravity	Niels Vincentz	2013	31764	
Lover	Stephen Riley	2013	31765	
Live at JazzFest Berlin	Ronnie Cuber	2013	31766	
The Angle Below	Peter Brendler and John Abercrombie	2013	31767	
Live in Tokyo	Martin Jacobsen	2013	31768	
Chorale	Kirk Knuffke	2013	31769	
Settling In	Ari Ambrose	2013	31770	
The Eternal Triangle	Peter Zak	2013	31771	
The Italian Suite	Jed Levy	2013	31772	
Jasmine Flower	Chris Byars	2013	31773	
Basquiat By Night/Day	Olegario Diaz	2013	31774	
Hope	Gregory Tardy	2014	31775	
Nocturne	Rich Perry	2014	31776	
Tjak Tjaka Tchicai	Pierre Dørge & New Jungle Orchestra	2014	31777	
Sweet Nowhere	Dick Oatts and Harold Danko	2014	31778	
Five	Kirk Knuffke and Jesse Stacken	2014	31779	
Places	Jason Palmer	2014	31780	
Numbers & Letters	Andrew Rathbun	2014	31781	
I Have a Dream	Andy LaVerne	2014	31782	
Ask Me Tomorrow	George Colligan	2014	31783	
The Question That Drives Us	Brian Charette	2014	31784	
Candlelight Lady	Dexter Gordon	2014	31785	
Discovery	Michael Cochrane	2014	31786	
The Music of Duke Jordan	Chris Byars	2014	31787	
Walkin' On Water	Vic Juris	2014	31788	
Mark My Words	Craig Brann	2014	31789	
Are You Real?	Stanley Cowell	2014	31790	
The Disciple	Peter Zak	2014	31791	
Baubles, Bangles and Beads	Stephen Riley	2014	31792	
Lost	Marcus Printup	2014	31793	
An Evening with Joe Albany	Joe Albany	2015	31794	Recorded live in Copenhagen May 1, 1973
Unsafe at any Speed	Jack Walrath	2015	31795	
Music for You	Freddie Redd	2015	31796	
Blui	Pierre Dørge	2015	31797	
With Songs of Joy	Gregory Tardy	2015	31798	
"Little Cross"	Kirk Knuffke	2015	31799	
Wondaland	Jason Palmer	2015	31800	
An Evening with Joe Albany, vol. 2	Joe Albany	2015	31801	Recorded live in Copenhagen May 1, 1973
At the Jazzhouse	Martin Jacobsen	2015	31802	
I Want To Hold Your Hand	Andy LaVerne	2007	31803	
Young Bloods	Marcus Printup	2015	31804	
Organique	Rich Perry	2014	31805	
Haunted Hearts	Stephen Riley	2014	31806	
Two Fives	Chris Byars	2014	31807	
Brooklyn Aura	Dave Scott	2015	31808	
Reminiscent	Stanley Cowell	2015	31809	
Blue	Vic Juris	2014	31810	
Whirlwind	Andy Fusco	2003	31811	
Lost In The Breeze	Harold Danko	2015	31812	
Where Angels Fear To Tread	Joel Weiskopf	2015	31813	
A Conversation Between Brothers	Craig Brann	2015	31814	
Standards	Peter Zak	2014	31815	
Retrospect	Ari Ambrose	2015	31816	
With Due Respect	Freddie Redd	2014/2015	31817	
Genesis	Andy LaVerne	2015	31818	
Ubi Zaa	Pierre Dørge	2015	31819	
Beauty 'n' Numbers	Jason Palmer	2015	31820	
Chasing After The Wind	Gregory Tardy	2015	31821	
Satie	Kirk Knuffke & Jesse Stacken	2015	31822	
Aleph In Chromatic	Olegario Diaz	2015	31823	
The Music of Frank Strozier	Chris Byars	2015	31824	
Deuce	Stephen Riley & Peter Zak	2015	31825	
The Pendulum	Mike Richmond	2016	31826	
Cities Between Us	Allegra Levy	2016	31827	
No Illusions	Stanley Cowell	2015	31828	
Vic Plays Victor	Vic Juris	2015	31829	
Mood	Rich Perry	2015	31830	
Joy-Riding	Andy Fusco	2015	31831	
Cherryco	Kirk Knuffke	2016	31832	
The Stroller	Zaid Nasser	2016	31833	
Hearts And Minds	Mark Soskin, Jay Anderson, Anthony Pinciotti	2017	31834	
Renewal	LeeAnn Ledgerwood with Ron McClure, Billy Hart	2017	31835	
Backup	Brian Charette	2016	31836	
Use Your Imagination	Dick Oatts	2017	31837	
The Message	Joel Weiskopf	2017	31838	
Triple Play	Harold Danko	2017	31839	
Faith	Andy LaVerne	2017	31840	
Eye Contact	Vic Juris	2018	31841	
New York City Jazz	Chris Byars	2018	31842	
Turmoil	Andy Fusco	2018	31843	
Alternative Contrafacts	Gary Smulyan	2018	31844	
Magic Trick	Joe Magnarelli	2018	31845	
Soundscapes	Pierre Dørge	2018	31846	
Lineage	Craig Brann	2018	31847	
Ronnie's Trio	Ronnie Cuber	2018	31848	
Transformation	Gene Segal	2018	31849	
Hold 'Em Joe	Stephen Riley	2018	31850	
Tones For Joan's Bones	Mike Richmond	2018	31851	
Looking At The Moon	Allegra Levy	2018	31852	
I Remember Chet	Olegario Diaz	2018	31853	
The Detroit Songbook	Greg Burk	2018	31854	
At Wally's vol. 1	Jason Palmer	2018	31855	
''At Wally's vol. 2	Jason Palmer	2018	31856	
Groovin’ With Big G	Brian Charette, George Coleman	2018	31857	
Upper West Side Stories	Mark Soskin	2018	31858	
Transformation	Gene Segal	2018	31859	
Straight Street	Ronnie Cuber	2019	31860	
New Beginning	Burak Bedikyan	2018	31861	
Character Study	Andrew Rathbun	2018	31862	
Change	Russ Lossing	2018	31863	
In Search Of Hipness	Dave Scott	2018	31864	
Crop Circles	John Hart	2018	31865	
Comencio	Rob Scheps	2018	31866	
Play Date	Harold Danko & Kirk Knuffke	2018	31867	
A Hundred Years From Today	Chris Byars	2018	31868	
Two Guitars	Vic Juris	2018	31869	
Deepscape	Jay Anderson	2019	31870	
Home With You, At Last	Adam Niewood	2019	31871	
Shangri-la	Andy LaVerne	2019	31872	
Introducing	Steven Herring	2019	31873	
Sweet Love. Jason Palmer plays Anita Baker	Jason Palmer	2019	31874	
Vortex	Andy Fusco	2019	31875	
Other Matters	Rich Perry	2019	31876	
Lucky Sunday	Ron McClure	2019	31877	
La vie en rose	Mike Richmond	2019	31878	
The Twelve	Craig Brann	2019	31879	
Beyond Borderline	Brian Charette	2019	31880	
Oleo	Stephen Riley	2019	31881	
Four	Ronnie Cuber	2019	31882	
Curiosity	Gene Segal	2020	31883	
Nice Treatment feat. Dave Scott & Rich Perry	TrioTrio	2020	31884	
Act Three	John Hart	2020	31885	
New York Moments	Yvonnick Prené	2019	31886	
Ambiguity	Dave Scott	2020	31887	
On the Shoulders of Giants	Chris Byars	2020	31888	
All for Now	Gary Versace	2020	31889	
Everything Old Is New Again	Mark Soskin	2020	31890	
Blue as a Whistle	Adam Niewood	2020	31891	
Friday the 13th	Stephen Riley	2020	31892	
Gentle Rain	Marcus Printup, Riza Printup	2020	31893	
Let's Cool One	Vic Juris	2020	31894	
Our Contrafacts	Gary Smulyan	2020	31895	
Tight Like This	Kirk Knuffke	2020	31896	
Remembrance	Andy Fusco	2020	31897	
Mood Suite	Russ Lossing	2020	31898	
Northern Noir	Ran Blake & Andrew Rathbun	2020	31899	
Lose My Number	Allegra Levy	2020	31900	
Streaming	Scott Lee	2020	31901	
From Where We Came	Michael Feinberg	2020	31902	
Tough Baritones	Ronnie Cuber & Gary Smulyan	2021	31903	
Bluu Afroo	Pierre Dørge & NJO feat. Stephen Riley	2020	31904	
Rhapsody	Andy LaVerne	2021	31905	
Contemptment	Noah Preminger	2020	31906	
A Change in the Weather	Steve LaSpina	2020	31907	
Live at Keystone Korner	Stanley Cowell	2020	31908	
Spring Garden	Harold Danko	2021	31909	
Checkmate	John Hart	2021	31910	
Power from the Air	Brian Charette	2021	31911	
I Remember You	Stephen Riley	2021	31912	
Happy Destiny	Rich Perry	2021	31913	
Ballad for a Rainy Afternoon	Mark Soskin	2021	31914	
Double Rainbow	Gene Segal	2021	31915	
Straight Off	Martin Jacobsen	2021	31916	
Introspection	John Hart	2021	31917	
Fleet from the Heat	Alex Norris	2021	31918	
Past Present Future	Craig Brann	2021	31919	
Early Spring	Anthony Ferrara	2021	31920	
Puzzle People	Nate Radley	2021	31921	
Euphoria	John Hart	2022	31922	
In My Own Way	Monnette Sudler	2021	31923	
Living a Dream We’re Not In	Garry Dial & Jay Anderson	2021	31924	
Staycation: A Family Affair	Ralph Lalama	2022	31925	
Montmartre ’73 feat. Bent Jædig	Duke Jordan	2022	31926	
TrioTrio Meets Sheila Jordan	TrioTrio & Sheila Jordan	2022	31927	
Songs We Love	Noah Preminger & Max Light	2022	31928	
Rhythm and Blues of the 20s	Chris Byars	2022	31929	
Con Alma	Jason Palmer	2022	31930	
Rite Notes	Harold Danko	2022	31931	
My Romance	Stephen Riley	2022	31932	
TimeFrame	Gary Versace	2022	31933	
Semantics	Andrew Rathbun	2022	31934	
NightQuest	Ron McClure	2022	31935	
Tadd’s All, Folks	Gary Smulyan featuring Anais Reno	2022	31936	
Everything Happens	Rich Perry	2022	31937	
Cold Faded	Anthony Ferrara	2022	31938	
New York Osada Junction	Joe Magnarelli	2022	31939	
Song for Alice	Dave Scott	2023	31940	
Turn Out the Stars	Mike Richmond	2023	31941	
The Unwinding	Steve Millhouse	2023	31942	
Empathy	Mark Soskin & Jay Anderson	2023	31943	
Falling in Love	Dick Sisto	2023	31944	
Look Ahead	Chris Byars	2023	31945	
Henceforth	Max Light	2023	31946	
Snapshots	Nate Radley & Gary Versace	2023	31947	
Resonance	John Hart	2023	31948	
Chess Moves	Alex Norris	2023	31949	
The Speed of Time	Andrew Rathbun	2023	31950	
Progression	Rich Perry	2023	31951	
Trillium	Harold Danko	2023	31952	
A Soul Contract	Paul Brusger	2023	31953	
Run with the Hunted	Jamale Davis	2024	31954	
The Talisman	Dave Pietro	2024	31955	
Beyond Nostalgia	Akiko Tsuruga	2024	31956	
Slush Pump Truck Stop	Alex Heitlinger big band	2024	31957	
Spot On	Andy LaVerne	2024	31958	
Just Sayin’	Ron McClure	2024	31959	
Copenhagen Unissued Session 1977	Stan Getz	2024	31960	
Out of the Question	Allegra Levy	2024	31961	
Bopticks	Chris Byars	2024	31962	
Boss Baritones	Gary Smulyan & Frank Basile	2024	31963	
Super Blonde	Kirk Knuffke	2024	31964	
Setting Standards	Dave Scott	2024	31965	
Forward Motion	David Janeway	2024	31966	
Love Is	John Hart	2024	31967	
Lost in the Shadow	Andrew Rathbun	2025	31968	
Two for Bill	Andy LaVerne & Dick Sisto	2024	31969	
Manhattanville Serenade	Mferghu	2024	31970	
Mythology	Steve Johns	2025	31971	
Say It's So	Nate Radley	2025	31972	
Working Out With Big G	Brian Charette & George Coleman	2025	31973	
Table For Three	Alex Norris	2025	31974	
Factory Fresh	Anthony Ferrara	2025	31975	
Concord	Joe Magnarelli	2025	31976	
Borderless	Brian Charette	2025	31977	
The New Gypsies featuring feat. Vic Juris	Vic Juris & Tony Miceli	2026	31978	
Mean What You Say	Yves Brouqui	2025	31979	
At Club Danshaku, NY 1993	Ron McClure Don Friedman & Vic Juris	2025	31980	
Jazzhus Montmartre Live	Pierre Dørge & New Jungle Orchestra	2025	31981	
Looking Back To Today	Steve Millhouse	2025	31982	
Nico's Dream	Tony Miceli	2025	31983	
For The Record	Craig Brann & Gregory Tardy	2025	31984	
Synergi	Paul Bollenback & Boris Kozlov	2025	31985	
Streamers	Scott Lee	2025	31986	
The Dark Forrest	Chris Byars	2025	31987	
Crystal Nights	Andy LaVerne	2025	31988	
Dream	Rich Perry	2025	31989	
Song For Mbizo	Pierre Dørge, Kirk Knuffke, Thommy Andersson, Matin Andersen	2025	31990	
Epis Power	Ivan Farmakovskiy Christian McBride, Jack DeJohnette	2025	31991	
School Of Tristano 4	Eric Rasmussen	2025	31992	
Shorter Songs	Jason Palmer	2025	31993	
Suits And Scotches	Matt Garrity	2026	31994	
The Butterfly Effect	Dave Pietro	2026	31995	
Shimmering Blue	Thommy Andersson	2026	31996	
Glow	David Friedman & Tony Miceli	2026	31997	
New Mantra	John Hart	2026	31998	
Brother	Kirk Knuffke	2026	31999	

=== 33100 SteepleChase LookOut Series ===
The SteepleChase LookOut Series releases contemporary new jazz since 2012.

Title	Artist	Year released	Catalogue No. SCCD	Notes
Different Times	Old Time Musketry	2012	33101	Recorded in New York 2011
Father And Son	Skip Wilkins	2012	33102	Recorded in New York 2011
Renaissance Man	Ronan Guilfoyle/John Abercrombie	2012	33103	Recorded 2008
Standard Fare	Eliot Zigmund	2012	33104	Recorded 2011
Throughout	JP Schlegelmilch	2013	33105	Recorded 2011/2012
Jour de Fête	Yvonnick Prené	2013	33106	Recorded in New York 2012
North By Northwest	Joe Manis feat. George Colligan	2013	33107	Recorded 2012
Enchanted Sun	Rotem Sivan	2013	33108	Recorded 2012
Circle Of Life	Burak Bedikyan	2013	33109	Recorded 2012
Just Another Day At The Office	Anders Mogensen feat. Gary Thomas	2013	33110	Recorded in Copenhagen 2013
Out And About	Bob Sands	2013	33111	Recorded 2012
2alto	Samo Šalamon feat. Lora Stillman	2014	33112	Recorded 2012
Mostly Music	Paolo Sapia feat. Jimmy Cobb	2014	33113	Recorded in New York 2013
Mental Images	Gene Segal	2014	33114	Recorded in New York 2013
Waiting For The Next Trans	Paul Brusger feat. Gary Smulyan, Louis Hayes	2014	33115	Recorded in New York 2013
Cooper Ridge	Christian Coleman-Gavin Ahearn	2014	33116	Recorded in New York 2014
Trinomial	Mark Minchello, Bob Hanlon	2014	33117	Recorded in New York 2013/2014
Lonely City	Allegra Levy	2014	33118	Recorded in New York 2013
Leap Of Faith	Burak Bedikyan feat. Chris Cheek	2014	33119	Recorded in New York 2014
The Golden Mean	Joe Manis feat. George Colligan	2015	33120	Recorded 2014
Matter	Gene Segal	2015	33121	Recorded in New York 2014
A Sax Supreme	Peter & Will Anderson	2015	33122	Recorded live in New York 2015
Workout	Bernd Reiter feat. Eric Alexander	2016	33123	Recorded live in Switzerland 2015
Clean Spring	Greg Burk	2016	33124	Recorded in Rome 2015
You'll See	Federico Bonifazi feat. Eric Alexander, Jimmy Cobb	2016	33125	Recorded in New York 2015
Mystery Moon	Irene Becker & Aviaja Lumholt	2015	33126	Recorded in Copenhagen 2015
Magic Light	Eugenia Choe	2016	33127	Recorded in New York 2015
Moments In Time	David Ambrisio/Russ Meissner	2016	33128	Recorded in New York 2014
Awakening	Burak Bedikyan	2016	33129	Recorded in New York 2015
Deconstructing Mr. X	Carl Winther	2016	33130	Recorded 2015
Camaraderie	Mark Minchello, Bob Hanlon	2017	33131	Recorded in New York 2015/2016
Spiral	Gene Segal feat. Brian Charette	2017	33132	Recorded in New York 2015
Clarinet Summit	Peter & Will Anderson	2017	33133	Recorded live in New York 2016
Inner Journey	Carl Winther & Jerry Bergonzi	2017	33134	Recorded in Boston 2016
E. 74 ST.	Federico Bonifazi feat. Philip Harper	2017	33135	Recorded in New York/Italy 2014/2716
Time Was	Eliot Zigmund feat. Chris Cheek	2017	33136	Recorded in New York in 2011
Verdant Dream	Eugenia Choe	2018	33137	Recorded in New York 2017
Autumn Suite	Federico Bonifazi	2019	33138	Recorded in Italy 2017
Istanbul Junction	Burak Bedikyan	2019	33139	Recorded in Istanbul 2017
Biotope	Marc Benham	2020	33140	Recorded in Paris 2018
Last Minute	Federico Bonifazi	2021	33141	Recorded in Italy in 2019
Something Joyful	Jonathan Orland	2021	33142	Recorded in Paris 2020
Sings Irving Berlin	Yaala Ballin	2020	33143	Recorded in New York 2019
Code 2	Peter McEachern	2021	33144	Recorded 2019
Distant Voices	David Janeway	2021	33145	Recorded in New York 2020
Coltrane revisited	Kirk Lightsey	2021	33146	Recorded 2015
Mystic Life	Yoko Yates	2022	33147	Recorded in New York 2019
Paraphrase	Michael Eaton & Nicki Adams	2022	33148	Recorded in New York 2020
Behind The Clouds	Soyoung Park	2023	33149	Recorded 2015
Interstage	David Janeway	2023	33150	Recorded in New York 1993
The Transcendental	Michael Eaton & Nicki Adams	2023	33151	Recorded in New York 2023
Inner Senses	Carol Liebowitz & Nick Lyons	2023	33152	Recorded in New York 2023

=== 6000 Classics Series ===
The SteepleChase 6000 Classics series released 44 albums of archive material from 1978 and on.

Title	Artist	Year released	Catalogue No. SCC	Catalogue No. SCCD	Notes
At The Golden Circle, Vol. 1	Bud Powell	1978	6001	36001	Recorded in Stockholm April 1962
At The Golden Circle, Vol. 2	Bud Powell	1978	6002	36002	Recorded in Stockholm April 1962
Axen	Bent Axen Trio & Quintet	1978	6003	36003	Recordings from 1959 and 1961
Cry Me A River	Dexter Gordon & Alti Bjorn Trio	1978	6004	36004	Recorded November 1962 and May 1964
Dr. Jackle	Jackie McLean	1979	6005	36005	Recorded live in Baltimore December 1966
Copenhagen Concert	Buck Clayton All Stars featuring Jimmy Rushing	1979	6006/7		Recorded in Copenhagen Sept 1959
Copenhagen Concert vol.1	Buck Clayton All Stars	1979		36006	Recorded in Copenhagen Sept 1959
Copenhagen Concert vol.2	Buck Clayton All Stars featuring Jimmy Rushing	1979		36007	Recorded in Copenhagen Sept 1959
Cheese Cake	Dexter Gordon Quartet	1979	6008	36008	Recorded June 1964
At the Golden Circle, Vol. 3	Bud Powell	1979	6009	36009	Recorded in Stockholm April 1962
Short Story	Kenny Dorham	1979	6010	36010	Recorded live in Copenhagen December 1963
Scandia Skies	Kenny Dorham	1980	6011	36011	Recorded live in Copenhagen December 1963
King Neptune	Dexter Gordon	1979	6012	36012	Recorded live in Copenhagen June 1964
The House I Live In	Archie Shepp / Lars Gullin Quintet	1980	6013	36013	Recorded live in Copenhagen November 1963
At The Golden Circle, Vol. 4	Bud Powell	1980	6014	36014	Recorded in Stockholm April 1962
I Want More	Dexter Gordon Quartet	1980	6015	36015	Recorded live in Copenhagen July 1964
If I Had You	Brew Moore Quartet	1981	6016	36016	Recorded live in Copenhagen April 1965
At The Golden Circle, Vol. 5	Bud Powell	1980	6017	36017	Recorded in Stockholm April 1962
Love for Sale	Dexter GordonQuartet	1981	6018	36018	Recorded live in Copenhagen July 1964
I Should Care	Brew Moore Quartet	1982	6019	36019	Recorded live in Copenhagen April 1965
For Europeans Only	Don Redman	1983	6020/21	36020	Recorded live in Copenhagen September 1946
It's You or No One	Dexter Gordon	1983	6022	36022	Recorded live in Copenhagen August 1964
Tune Up	Jackie McLean Quartet	1987	6023	36023	Recorded live in Baltimore December 1966
Copenhagen Concert	Dizzy Gillespie Quintet	1992	6024	36024	Recorded live in Copenhagen 1959
Stockholm Jam Session 1	Phineas Newborn	1992		36025	Recorded in Stockholm September 1958
Stockholm Jam Session 2	Phineas Newborn	1993		36026	Recorded in Stockholm September 1958
Nu!	Hugh Steinmetz	2001		36027	Six tracks released on Debut in 1966 plus six previously unreleased recordings
Billie's Bounce	Dexter Gordon Quartet	1983	6028	36028	Recorded in Copenhagen August 1964
Action Action	The Contemporary Jazz Quartet	2001		36029/30	Originally released on Debut in 1964 and 1968
Wee Dot	Dexter Gordon	2003		36031	Recorded in Copenhagen June 1965
Loose Walk	Dexter Gordon	2004		36032	Recorded in Copenhagen June 1965
Misty	Dexter Gordon	2004		36033	Recorded in Copenhagen June 1965.
Heartaches	Dexter Gordon	2004		36034	Recorded in Copenhagen in August 1965
Ladybird	Dexter Gordon	2005		36035	Recorded in Copenhagen August 1965
Stella by Starlight	Dexter Gordon	2005		36036	Recorded in Copenhagen January 1966
Zonky	Brew Moore	2005		36037	Recorded in Copenhagen February 1966
Satin Doll	Dexter Gordon	2005		36038	Recorded in Copenhagen June 1967
Soul Sister	Dexter Gordon	2022		36039	Recorded in Copenhagen & Oslo June 1962
1962 Copenhagen	Bud Powell	2021		36040	Recorded in Copenhagen 1962
1962 Stockholm - Oslo	Bud Powell	2021		36041	Recorded in Stockholm & Oslo September 1962
Special Brew	Brew Moore	2022		36042	Recorded in Malmø Sweden & Copenhagen 1962
Malmö Sweden	Rolf Billberg	2024		36043	Recorded live in Malmø Sweden 1965
Sketching For Les Liasons Dangereuses	Duke Jordan	2025		36044	Recorded in New York 1959
In Concert	Benny Goodman Orchestra	2022		36501	Recorded in Copenhagen Oct 1959
In Concert	Gerry Mulligan Concert Jazz Band	2022		36502	Recorded in Copenhagen & Berlin Oct/Nov 1960
In Concert	Roy Eldridge Quartet, Ella Fitzgerald Quartet	2022		36503	Recorded in Copenhagen April 1959
In Concert	Art Blakey & The Jazz Messengers	2022		36504	Recorded in Copenhagen Feb 1962
In Concert	Cannonball Adderley Quintet	2022		36505	Recorded in Copenhagen April 1961
In Concert	Gerry Mulligan Quartet	2023		36506	Recorded in Copenhagen May 1959
In Concert	Johnny Hodges	2023		36507	Recorded in Copenhagen March 1961
In Concert	Count Basie Orchestra	2023		36508	Recorded in Copenhagen April 1962
In Concert	Jimmy Guiffre Trio, Gene Krupa Quartet	2023		36509	Recorded in Copenhagen Oct 1959
In Concert	Dizzy Gillespie Quintet	2024		36511	Recorded in Copenhagen Oct 1961
Oscar Pettiford Memorial Concert	Various artists	2024		36512	Recorded in Copenhagen Oct 1960
In Concert	Louis Armstrong All Stars	2026		36513	Recorded in Copenhagen Feb 1959
