= Doug Raney =

American jazz guitarist

Background information
- Born: August 29, 1956; New York City, U.S.
- Died: May 1, 2016 (aged 59); Copenhagen, Denmark
- Genres: Jazz
- Occupation: Musician
- Instrument: Guitar
- Years active: 1977–2016
- Labels: SteepleChase

Doug Raney (August 29, 1956 – May 1, 2016) was an American jazz guitarist. He was the son of jazz guitarist Jimmy Raney.

== Career ==
Raney was born in New York City. He began to play the guitar when he was 14, beginning with rock and blues. He was given lessons by guitarist Barry Galbraith and became more interested in jazz. When he was 18, he played at a club in New York with pianist Al Haig. In 1977, he accompanied his father, jazz guitarist Jimmy Raney, in a duo. They toured Europe, and then Doug Raney moved to Copenhagen, Denmark. When he was 21, he recorded his first album as a leader, Introducing Doug Raney, for SteepleChase in 1977. Beginning in 1979, he recorded several albums with his father.

During his career, he worked with Chet Baker, George Cables, Joey DeFrancesco, Kenny Drew, Tal Farlow, Tomas Franck, Dexter Gordon, Johnny Griffin, Billy Hart, Hank Jones, Clifford Jordan, Duke Jordan, Jesper Lundgaard, Red Mitchell, Adam Nussbaum, Niels-Henning Ørsted Pedersen, Horace Parlan, Bernt Rosengren, and Jesper Thilo. Raney died of heart failure at the age of 59 on May 1, 2016.

== Discography ==
=== As leader ===
- Introducing Doug Raney (SteepleChase, 1978)
- Cuttin' Loose (SteepleChase, 1979)
- Stolen Moments with Jimmy Raney (SteepleChase, 1979)
- Duets with Jimmy Raney (SteepleChase, 1980)
- Listen (SteepleChase, 1981)
- I'll Close My Eyes (SteepleChase, 1982)
- Nardis with Jimmy Raney (SteepleChase, 1983)
- Blue and White (SteepleChase, 1984)
- Meeting the Tenors (Criss Cross, 1984)
- Lazy Bird (SteepleChase, 1985)
- Guitar Guitar Guitar (SteepleChase, 1985)
- Everything We Love with Thorgeir Stubø (Hot Club, 1985)
- Something's Up (SteepleChase, 1988)
- The Doug Raney Quintet (SteepleChase, 1989)
- Blues On a Par (SteepleChase, 1994)
- Back in New York (SteepleChase, 1997)
- Raney '96 (SteepleChase, 1997)
- The Backbeat (SteepleChase, 1999)

=== As sideman ===
With Chet Baker

- The Touch of Your Lips (SteepleChase, 1979)
- Daybreak (Steeplechase, 1980)
- This Is Always (Steeplechase, 1982)
- Someday My Prince Will Come (SteepleChase, 1983)

With others

- John McNeil, I've Got the World On a String (SteepleChase, 1983)
- Red Mitchell, Soft and Warm and Swinging! (Phontastic, 1982)
- Horace Parlan, Hi-Fly (SteepleChase, 1978)
- Jimmy Raney, Raney '81 (Criss Cross, 1981)
- Hugo Rasmussen, Sweets to the Sweet (RCA Victor, 1978)
- Hugo Rasmussen, More Sweets... (Music Mecca, 2000)
- Bernt Rosengren, Bernt Rosengren Big Band (Caprice, 1980)
- Bernt Rosengren, Surprise Party (SteepleChase, 1983)
- Louis Smith, Once in a While (SteepleChase, 1999)
- Thorgeir Stubo, The End of a Tune (Cadence, 1988)
- Jan Erik Vold, Obstfelder Live Pa Rebekka West (Hot Club, 1994)
- Martin Jacobsen, At The Jazz House (SteepleChase, 2015)
