= 1985 in Norwegian music =

The following is a list of notable events and releases of the year 1985 in Norwegian music.

== Events ==
=== March ===
- 29 – The 12th Vossajazz started in Vossavangen, Norway (March 29 – 31).

=== May ===
- 4 – With the song "La det swinge" ("Let it swing"), Norway's Norwegian pop duo Bobbysocks! won the Eurovision Song Contest 1985.
- 22 – 13th Nattjazz started in Bergen, Norway (May 22 – June 5).

=== June ===
- 30 – The 16th Kalvøyafestivalen started at Kalvøya near by Oslo.

=== September ===
- 16 – The Pop band A-ha released a new version of their single Take On Me, which debuted last year, featuring a cartoon music video, and within weeks it is a number one hit worldwide in countries including the United Kingdom and the United States of America.

== Albums released ==
=== Unknown date ===
G

Jan Garbarek

- Song For Everyone (ECM Records), with L. Shankar, Zakir Hussain, and Trilok Gurtu

K

Karin Krog

- Some Other Spring, Blues And Ballads (Bluebell Records), with Dexter Gordon

N

Lillebjørn Nilsen

- Hilsen Nilsen (Grappa Music)

R

Terje Rypdal

- Chaser (ECM Records)

S

Thorgeir Stubø

- Everything We Love (Hot Club Records), with Doug Raney
- Flight (Hot Club Records)

== Deaths ==
May

- 29 – Christian Hartmann, composer (born 1910).

August

- 5 – Olav Kielland, composer and orchestra conductor (born 1901).

November

- 18 – Stephan Henrik Barratt-Due, violinist and music teacher (born 1919).

== Births ==
January

- 2
  - André Roligheten, jazz saxophonist and composer.
  - Marius Neset, jazz saxophonist and composer.
- 10
  - Gabrielle Leithaug, Electropop singer and songwriter.
- 29 – Jon Rune Strøm, jazz upright bassist, and bass guitarist.

February

- 19 – Kristoffer Lo, jazz tubist, flugabonist, guitarist and composer.
- 25 – Anine Stang, singer and songwriter.

March

- 5 – Eyolf Dale, jazz pianist and composer.
- 15 – Trygve Wiese, pop singer.

April

- 12 – Siri Nilsen, singer, songwriter and voice actress.

May

- 13 – Alexander Rybak, singer, songwriter, violinist, pianist, and actor.
- 14 – Tore Sandbakken, jazz drummer and composer.

June

- 20 – Ellen Brekken, jazz upright bassist, bass guitarist and tubist.

July

- 2 – Gunnhild Sundli, actor and singer (Gåte).
- 6 – Maria Arredondo, pop singer.
- 8 – Vivian Sørmeland, pop singer.

August

- 1 – Caroline "Dina" Lillian Kongerud, pop artist.
- 15 – Carina Dahl, pop singer and songwriter.
- 22 – Kim Johannesen, jazz guitarist and improviser.

October

- 11 – Margaret Berger, singer, songwriter, music director, and DJ.
- 15 – Øystein Skar, jazz pianist and composer.

December

- 4 – Linni Meister, pop singer.
- 19 – Ine Hoem, jazz singer.

Unknown date

- Catharina Chen, classical violinist.
- Per Arne Ferner, jazz guitarist.

== See also ==
- 1985 in Norway
- Music of Norway
- Norway in the Eurovision Song Contest 1985
