= Andre Bilder =

Studio album by Vigleik Storaas Trio
- Released: September 18, 1997
- Recorded: October 7 & 8, 1996 at Rainbow Studio, Oslo
- Genre: Jazz
- Length: 57:33
- Label: Curling Legs
- Producers: Vigleik Storaas Trio & Jan Erik Kongshaug

Vigleik Storaas chronology
| Bilder (1995) | Andre Bilder (1997) | Open Excursions (1999) |

Andre Bilder is a studio album by Vigleik Storaas Trio. It was released September 18, 1997, by the label Curling Legs.

== Reception ==
Professional ratings
Review scores
| Source | Rating |
|---|---|
| Dagbladet | 5/6 stars |

The trio was awarded Spellemannprisen for Bilder (1995), and this follow-up album is of the same high quality. Accompanied by Johannes Eick (double bass) and Per Oddvar Johansen (drums) they opens the ball with a nod to Thelonious Monk in «Monk´S Stream». The material on Andre Bilder is for the most composed by Storaas and gives a perfect platform exploration of the piano trio format of today.

The review by Terje Mosnes of the Norwegian newspaper Dagbladet awarded the album dice 5.

== Honors ==
- Spellemannprisen 1997 in the class Jazz

== Track listing ==
1. «Monk´s Stream» (6:20)
2. «Mot At» (5:56)
3. «Senket» (6:30)
4. «Kramm» (3:39)
5. «Filling Up» (5:26)
6. «Awaiting B» (5:57)
7. «The Dream» (4:47)
8. «Alt Pluss Elleve» (3:32)
  Johannes Eick
9. «Waltz» (6:46)
10. «Kart» (8:4)
  Per Oddvar Johansen

== Personnel ==
- Piano – Vigleik Storaas
- Double bass – Johannes Eick
- Drums & percussion – Per Oddvar Johansen

== Credits ==
- Produced by the trio and Jan Erik Kongshaug
- Executive Producers: Curling Legs Productions DA
- Recorded and mixed at Rainbow Studios, Oslo, October 7 & 8, 1996
- Engineered and mixed by Jan Erik Kongshaug
- Cover Design: Mcleanjacket@graf.no
- Cover and liner photos by Johs Bøe
- Supported by Norsk Kassettavgiftsfond

== Notes ==
- All compositions by Vigleik Storaas except where noted
