= Ole Jacob Hansen =

Norwegian jazz drummer (1940–2000)

- Born: 16 April 1940; Oslo
- Origin: Norway
- Died: 6 March 2000 (aged 59)
- Genres: Jazz
- Occupations: Musician, Drummer
- Instrument: Drums

Ole Jacob Hansen (16 April 1940 – 6 March 2000) was a Norwegian jazz musician (drums), known from a number recordings and international cooperation.

== Career ==
Hansen was born in Oslo, and first established himself on the Oslo jazz scene in Tore Sandnæs Big Band (1958), Mikkel Flagstad Quintet (1959), Bjørn Jacobsen Septet (1958–60), Arild Wikstrøm Quartet (1961) and within Kjell Karlsen's various ensembles including at Moldejazz (1962), Bjørn Johansen Quartet (1962). He was subsequently within Bernt Rosengren Orchestra in Stockholm (1963–64), with Idrees Sulieman (1964), and in Paris with Eric Dolphy and Donald Byrd.

At the Metropol Jazz Club he played with a number of the world's leading jazz musicians. During the 1970s, he contributed to several recordings with Ditlef Eckhoff, Paul Weeden and Terje Bjørklund, as well as within Adonis (74–75) with several gigs at Club 7. He established the club Jazz Alive (1980) in Oslo, and in the 1980s and 1990s he played with Thorgeir Stubø, Lee Konitz, Doug Raney, Laila Dalseth, Jan Erik Vold, Harald Gundhus, Knut Riisnæs, Totti Bergh, and Einar Iversen.

Hansen was a colorful and highly engaged drummer, and a central figure in Norwegian jazz from 1960 until his death.

== Honors ==
- Reenskaugprisen 1982
- Buddyprisen 1997
- Gammleng-prisen 1996 in the class Jazz

== Discography ==
- 1974: Attakullaculla (RCA International), with Paul Weeden
- 1976: La Dette Bli Min Sang (EMI Norge), with Stein Ove Berg
- 1978: Club 7's Jubileumsplater (Plateselskapet Mai), with various artists
- 1982: I'll Close My Eyes with Doug Raney
- 1983: Meeting the Tenors with Doug Raney
- 1983: The Improviser with Chet Baker
- 1984: Daydreams (Hot Club Records), with Laila Dalseth Quintet feat. Louis Stewart
- 1984: Everything We Love (Hot Club Records), with Doug Raney & Thorgeir Stubø
- 1984: Lazy Bird with Doug Raney
- 1988: The End of a Tune (Cadence Jazz Records), with Thorgeir Stubø
- 1988: Mood Indigo (Gemini Records), with Bjarne Nerem, Kenny Davern & Flip Phillips
- 1991: Constellations (Odin Records), with Bjørn Alterhaug
- 1997: Impressions of Antibes (Gemini Records), with Ditlef Eckhoff
- 2003: Friends (Gemini Records), within Kapstad-Johansen Quartet
- 2004: Live at Molde Jazzfestival 1976 (Jazzaway Records, NRK), with Carl Magnus Neumann & Christian Reim Quartet
- 2004: Jargong Vålereng' (Ponca Jazz Records), with Rolf Søder & Egil Kapstad Og Hans Musikanter
- 2005: Til Jorden (Pan Records), with Rolf Jacobsen & Egil Kapstad
- 2007: NRK Sessions: Soul, Afro-Jazz And Latin From The Club 7 Scene (Plastic Strip, NRK), with various artists
- 2008: Live at Kongsberg And Other Unreleased Works (Plastic Strip), with Carl Magnus Neumann
- 2008: Unreleased Works 1969–1979 (Plastic Strip), with Christian Reim

Awards
Preceded by Egil Johansen	Recipient of the Jazz Gammleng-prisen; 1996	Succeeded by Bjørn Johansen
Preceded by Per Jørgensen	Recipient of the Jazz Buddyprisen; 1997	Succeeded by Magni Wentzel
