= Subsonic (album) =

Studio album by Vigleik Storaas Trio
- Released: January 1, 2002
- Recorded: March 2 & 3, 2000 at Rainbow Studio, Oslo
- Genre: Jazz
- Length: 44:54
- Label: Curling Legs

Vigleik Storaas chronology
Open Excursions (1999)	Subsonic (2002)	Now (2007)

Subsonic (released January 1, 2002 by the label Curling Legs - CLPCD 71) is a studio album by Vigleik Storaas Trio.

== Critical reception ==
Storaas returns with a new trio recording, backed by Johannes Eick (double bass) and Per Oddvar Johansen (drums). The setting is ideal for a solo excursions by Storaas and the near telepathic interplay with his trio. The material on Subsonic is mostly composed by Storaas and represents a distinct stylistic foil for the trio’s exploration of the modern piano trio’s format. The legacy of Bill Evans is evident throughout the album, but still the trio displays vast amounts of its own identity and character. Introspective and searching at times, but also balanced and sometimes loose in its form, Subsonic vas nominated for Spellemannprisen 2002.

== Track listing ==
1. "Three Princes" (8:18)
2. "Mist" (4:24)
3. "Zik-Zak" (8:05)
4. "Ar" (10:07)
  Per Oddvar Johansen
5. "Subsonic" (6:06)
  Johannes Eick
6. "Feng 7" (7:54)

== Personnel ==
- Piano – Vigleik Storaas
- Double bass – Johannes Eick
- Drums & percussion – Per Oddvar Johansen

== Credits ==
- Engineered and mastered by Jan Erik Kongshaug
- Cover photos by Knut Værnes
- Cover design by Christin Borge Johansen
- Supported by Norsk Kulturråd

== Notes ==
- All compositions by Vigleik Storaas except where noted
- Recorded at Rainbow Studios, Oslo, March 2 & 3, 2000
- Mixed October 1, 2001
