= Espen Rud =

Norwegian jazz drummer, composer, and arranger (born 1948)

- Born: 29 January 1948 (age 78); Asker, Norway
- Genres: Jazz
- Occupation: Musician
- Instrument: Drums
- Labels: Curling Legs, Odin

Espen Rud (born 29 January 1948) is a Norwegian jazz musician (drums), composer, and music arranger. He was born in Asker, the son of Norwegian author Nils Johan Rud (1908–93). He is known from numerous recordings and in collaboration with Karin Krog and Dexter Gordon, within Terje Rypdal's trio Min Bul, or the absurd musical theater of Svein Finnerud Trio.

== Career ==
Rud joined the fri jazz band Svein Finnerud Trio (1967–74), was educated at the Norges Musikkhøgskole (1968), was percussionist within Pompel og Pilt (1969), was part of Min bul (1970) in trio with Terje Rypdal and Bjørnar Andresen, and contributed on the Karin Krog album Some other spring (1970), where Dexter Gordon and Kenny Drew also contributed. He also played within the Ivar Antonsen Trio, and led his own Quartet together with Ivar Antonsen, Ditlef Eckhoff and Sture Janson, performing at Moldejazz in 1969.

In the 1980s he started an extensive collaboration with Rikskonsertene (1978–), lately with Hans Mathisen and Jens Fossum («Vi improviserer»). He participated within Chet Baker Quartet, on the release The improviser (1983) including Per Husby and Bjørn Kjellemyr, recorded at Club 7. He also led the band «Kråbøl» (1978–83), from which one can hear performances on his release Hotelsuite (1984), with the band including Rob Waring, Elin Rosseland, Tore Brunborg, Karin Krog and Vigleik Storaas. Rud was performing within New Cool Quartet (1980–89), and was awarded the Buddyprisen 1983.

In the 1990s, he was within a trio including Johannes Eick and Christian Wallumrød. He released the album Rudlende (1998) within his own Sextet «Rudlende», awarded Spellemannprisen 1998 in the class Jazz (Tore Brunborg, Nils Jansen, Vigleik Storaas, Frode Nymo, and Terje Gewelt). Rud was on the quartet releases by Ivar Antonsen, Terje Gewelt and Knut Riisnæs. Later he played with Staffan William-Olsson Trio, Magni Wentzel Sextet, and Halvard Kausland/Hans Mathisen.

On his latest solo album Dobbeldans (2011) he connects Jai Shankar's Indian tabla rhythms with Latin grooves, Rud's specialty, but also straight hard swing with a slight taste of Norwegian traditional folk music. For the album title Double Dance, there are a four double coverage. The three saxophonists Frode and Atle Nymo, and Jon Pål Inderberg are challenged for all they are worth, and with everything to play for, which means bass clarinet and baritone saxophone to the bottom, on top soprano, and with the tenor and alto saxophones in between.

- Asker kommune Culture Award 2022
- Buddyprisen 1983
- Spellemannprisen 1998 in the class Jazz, for the album Rudlende

== Discography (in selection) ==
=== Solo albums ===
- 1984: Hotelsuite (Odin Records)
- 1998: Rudlende (Taurus Records) within his own Sextet «Rudlende», awarded Spellemannprisen 1998
- 2011: Dobbeldans (Curling Legs - CLP CD 121)
- 2012: Løvsamleren (Curling Legs - CLP CD 127)
- 2014: Ukjend By (Curling Legs - CLP CD 136)
- 2017: Carla The Fish (Curling Legs)

=== As band leader ===
- 1984: Hotelsuite (Odin Records), within his Sextet «Kråbøl»

=== Collaborative works ===
Within Svein Finnerud Trio

- 1970: Svein Finnerud Trio (Norsk Jazzforum)
- 1970: Plastic Sun (Sonet Music)
- 1970: Travel Pillow (Prisma Records)
- 2008: The Complete Released Works 1968-1999 (Plastic Strip)

With other projects

- 1970: Min bul (EmArcy 2003), within Terje Rypdal's Trio Min Bul
- 1978: Høysang (NorDisc), within Guttorm Guttormsen Quintet feat. Lars Klevstrand
- 1983: The improviser (Cadence Jazz Records), within the Chet Baker Quartet, including Per Husby & Bjørn Kjellemyr, recorded at Club 7
- 2012: Prøysen goes jazz (Curling Legs - CLP CD 124), within «Fire fyrer» (additional Torbjørn Sunde, Frode Kjekstad & Sigurd Hole)

With Chet Baker

- The Improviser (Cadence Jazz, 1983)

With Karin Krog and Dexter Gordon

- Some Other Spring (Sonet, 1970)

Awards
Preceded by Radka Toneff	Recipient of the Buddyprisen; 1983	Succeeded by Jon Balke
Preceded by Vigleik Storaas Trio	Recipient of the Jazz Spellemannprisen; 1998	Succeeded by Karin Krog & John Surman
