= The End of a Tune =

The End Of A Tune

Studio album by Thorgeir Stubo Quintet
- Released: 1986
- Recorded: 1983
- Genre: Jazz
- Length: 41:17
- Label: Cadence Jazz Records

Thorgeir Stubø chronology
Rhythm'A'Ning (1986)	The End Of A Tune (1986)

The End Of A Tune (released 1988 in Oslo, Norway by Cadence Jazz Records – CJR 10360) is a studio album (LP) by the Norwegian guitarist Thorgeir Stubø.

Professional ratings
Review scores
Source	Rating
Allmusic	3/5 stars

== Review ==
The career of Thorgeir Stubø was unfortunately all too short, and his last album The End Of A Tune was released after his death in 1986. Unlike its predecessor, a hard swinging album dominated by up-tempo and a harder beat, The End of a Tune is a more subdued and slower record. The album consists of slightly different lineup, with Jesper Lungaard (bass) and Ole Jacob Hansen (drums) as backing, and Ivar Antonsen playing the piano, while Doug Raney played guitar on some tracks. In addition, the American jazz star Art Farmer played flugelhorn on some tunes, among them the title track. The result was very successful, and "The End of a Tune" was certainly a worthy conclusion of a notable jazz career.

== Reception ==
The review by Allmusic awarded the album 3 stars.

== Track listing ==
A side

1. «They Say It's Wonderful»
  (Berlin, from "Annie Get your Gun")
2. «Strollin'»
  (Silver)
3. «If You Could See Me Now»
  (Dammeron)
4. «How About You?»
  (Burton/Lane)

B side

1. «C.J.'s Mountain»
  (Terje Bjørklunds)
2. «The Jitterbug Waltz»
  (Waller)
3. «Be My Love»
  (Tadd Dammeron)
4. «Lean Years»
  (Pat Martinos)
5. «The End of a Tune»
  (Allan Botschinsky)

== Personnel ==
- Thorgeir Stubø – guitar
- Doug Raney – guitar
- Art Farmer – flugelhorn
- Ivar Antonsen – piano
- Jesper Lundgaard – double bass
- Ole Jacob Hansen – drums
