= Bilder =

Studio album by Vigleik Storaas Trio
- Released: September 18, 1995
- Recorded: October 24–25, 1994 at Rainbow Studio, Oslo
- Genre: Jazz
- Length: 61:45
- Label: Curling Legs
- Producer: Vigleik Storaas Trio and Jan Erik Kongshaug

Vigleik Storaas chronology
Far To Go (1993)	Bilder (1995)	Andre Bilder (1997)

Bilder (released September 18, 1995 by the label Curling Legs - CLPCD 18) is a studio album by Vigleik Storaas Trio.

The material on this first album by the Vigleik Storaas Trio is composed by Storaas, and accompanied by Johannes Eick (double bass) and Per Oddvar Johansen (drums). The album won the 1995 Spelleman Award for Jazz.

== Track listing ==
1. «Slapp Av» (5:44)
2. «Ernest» (6:36)
3. «Monk's Picture» (6:23)
4. «Sco's Tune» (6:23)
5. «Ballade Impromptu» (6:24)
6. «Noe Annet» (6:06)
7. «Monk's Pencils» (4:20)
8. «Månelyst» (5:33)
9. «Tankalerl» (5:14)
10. «En Fremmed» (5:50)
11. «'Round Midnight» (4:28)

== Personnel ==
- Piano – Vigleik Storaas
- Double bass – Johannes Eick
- Drums – Per Oddvar Johansen

== Credits ==
- Produced by the trio and Jan Erik Kongshaug
- Recorded at Rainbow Studios, Oslo, October 24–25, 1994
- Mixed October 26, 1994
- Engineered and mixed by Jan Erik Kongshaug
- Edited and mastered by Jan Erik Kongshaug
- Fraphic Design by March How
- Liner Photos by Johs Bøe
