= Paul Weeden =

American jazz musician

Paul Winston Weeden (born 7 January 1923 in Indianapolis – 2 July 2011 in Oslo) was an American-Norwegian jazz guitarist and bandleader.

== Biography ==
In his hometown he played Wes Montgomery and J. J. Johnson with his neighbor before moving to New York City and then Philadelphia. He led the Paul Weeden Trio with organist Don Patterson and drummer Billy James, and they released an album with Dexter Gordon and Sonny Stitt (Blue Note Records, 1962). He also played in bands of Coleman Hawkins and Jimi Hendrix in the 1960s.

After touring in Sweden in 1966, he moved to Norway in 1971. With Magni Wentzel, Håkon Nilsen and Svein Christiansen he made the I Remember Clifford for EBU's "Eurojazz" (NRK, 1971). Weeden was central to the people surrounding the Club 7 venue, where he led the band Youngbloods as well as his own quartet (including drummer Ole Jacob Hansen, guitarist Bill Mulholland, and bassist Ray Taylor).

After the death of Freddie Green (1911–1987), Weeden replaced him on guitar in the Count Basie Orchestra, recommended by Harry Edison (1911–1999). He was contacted by the leader, Frank Foster (1928–2011) and joined on tour from January 1988.

In the 1990s he performed his own October for recording, including Vidar Johansen, Odd Riisnæs, Roy Nikolaisen, Eivin Sannes, Rune Nicolaysen, Kristen Svendsen, and Ole Jacob Hansen. The documentary Too Young To Be Old by Lene Midling-Jenssen (NRK, 2003) shows Weedens collaboration with "Grønnes Bad&Jazzforsyning" from Flekkefjord. This also led to record release (2003). He led up to 2006 his own quintet with Brinck Johnsen, Eivin Sannes, Kristen Svendsen and Tom Olstad.

He lived in Oslo to his death, and was the father of the musician Paul Weeden Jr., Ronald Weeden, Cynthia Weeden, Genice DeLemos, Dwayne DeLemos, April Weeden, Rickey Weeden, Lasse Weeden, Dennis Michael Weeden, and Thomas Weeden.

== Discography ==
- Now I Know Dreams Do Come True with Jimmy Coe (Weeden, 2000)
- Nice But Easy (Kultur & Spetakkel, 2003)
