= Now (Vigleik Storaas album) =

Studio album by Vigleik Storaas Trio
- Released: 2007
- Recorded: April 12, 2007 at Rainbow Studio, Oslo
- Genre: Jazz
- Length: 44:07
- Label: Inner Ear/Musikkkoperatørene

Vigleik Storaas chronology
| Subsonic (2002) | Now (2007) | Open Ears (2010) |

Now (released 2007 by the label Inner Ear/Musikkkoperatørene - INEA 03) is a studio album by Vigleik Storaas Trio.

== Critical reception ==
Professional ratings
Review scores
| Source | Rating |
|---|---|
| Nettavisen | 4/6 stars |
| Bergens Tidende | 6/6 stars |

On this album, Storaas gives a new trio, with new songs, on a new label. Johannes Eick is replaced by Mats Eilertsen, and the fresh energy that this bassist takes into the trio, combined with the relaxed interplay between Storaas and drummer Johansen, give this album an extra dimension. Here one can listen to one of Norway's finest pianists, in one of his peak performances on record so far.

The review by Tor Hammerø of the Norwegian electronic newspaper Nettavisen awarded the album dice 4, and the review by Peter Larsen of the Norwegian newspaper Bergens Tidende awarded the album dice 6, and states:

... You will not hear better trio performance in Norway today...

== Track listing ==
1. "Tuscan Waltz" (5:01)
2. "Brushes Baby" (6:10)
3. "Beehive" (5:53)
4. "By Night" (5:53)
5. "Rome" (6:19)
6. "Blues For Sivert" (5:04)
  (Per Oddvar Johansen)
7. "9-16" (4:24)
8. "Now" (5:06)

== Personnel ==
- Piano – Vigleik Storaas
- Double bass – Mats Eilertsen
- Drums – Per Oddvar Johansen

== Credits ==
- Mastered by Jan Erik Kongshaug
- Mixed by Jan Erik Kongshaug
- Recorded by Jan Erik Kongshaug

== Notes ==
- All compositions by Vigleik Storaas except where noted
- Recorded and mixed 12 and 13 April 2007
