= Open Excursions =

Studio album by Vigleik Storaas
- Released: May 28, 1999
- Recorded: 2 & 3 December 1996; 4 December 1998
- Studio: Rainbow Studio, Oslo, Norway; Sofienberg Kirke, Oslo
- Genre: Jazz
- Length: 45:00
- Label: Curling Legs/Musikkkoperatørene

Vigleik Storaas chronology
Andre Bilder (1997)	Open Excursions (1999)	Subsonic (2002)

Open Excursions is a jazz album by Norwegian pianist Vigleik Storaas.

== Critical reception ==
Professional ratings
Review scores
Source	Rating
Dagbladet	5/6 stars

Terje Mosnes of the Norwegian newspaper Dagbladet gave the album five stars.

== Track listing ==
1. "How Deep Is the Ocean" (5:23)
2. "Elegi" (5:13)
3. "Kora" (2:43)
4. "5. Okt." (6:31)
5. "Waltz Is This Thing" (5:46)
6. "Three Coins" (6:52)
7. "Cuban Mood" (6:07)
8. "By the Fire" (6:25)

== Personnel ==
- Piano – Vigleik Storaas

== Credits ==
- Mastered by Jan Erik Kongshaug
- Mixed by Jan Erik Kongshaug
- Recorded by Jan Erik Kongshaug

== Notes ==
- All compositions by Vigleik Storaas except where noted
- Tracks 1, 3 and 7 recorded and mixed at Rainbow Studio, Oslo, 2 & 3 Dec. 1996

All other tracks recorded in Sofienberg Kirke, Oslo, 4 Dec. 1998
