= Epistel No 5 =

Studio album by Vigleik Storaas Trio
- Released: September 28, 2012
- Recorded: May 21, 2011 at Rainbow Studio, Oslo, except track 9 recorded May 4, 2010 at Festiviteten, Eidsvoll
- Genre: Jazz
- Length: 54:23
- Label: Inner Ear/Musikkkoperatørene

Vigleik Storaas chronology
Open Ears (2010)	Epistel No 5 (2012)

Epistel No 5 (released September 28, 2012 by the label Inner Ear/Musikkkoperatørene - INEA 16) is a studio album by Vigleik Storaas Trio.

== Critical reception ==
Professional ratings
Review scores
Source	Rating
Dagbladet	5/6 stars

In its very soft language Vigleik Storaas Trio performs the five of the nine compositions by Storaas, while Kenny Wheeler, Sam Rivers and Michel Legrand is «guest composers». The veterans Mats Eilertsen and Per Oddvar Johansen, in addition to Storaas, still know how to do it, with a majority of ballads, but in between there are more refined tunes like "Epistel" and the waltz "Eidsvoll". It is not merely beautiful, the trio also impresses with its secure interaction and ability to vary the rhythm and intensity. Reviewer Kjell Moe of the Norwegian newspaper Nordlys states:

... It's not particularly original to be compared to Bill Evans, but Storaas' abilities with his distinct and clear language in the moderate and slow pace to add an extra dimension in the form of an understated excitement...

The review by Terje Mosnes of the Norwegian newspaper Dagbladet awarded the album dice 5.

== Track listing ==
1. "Aspire" (7:29)
2. "Epistel" (4:20)
3. "Mood Piece" (6:27)
4. "A Myriad Of Approaches" (6:12)
5. "Til Sivert" (4:59)
6. "Balladeer" (7:17)
7. "Eidsvoll" (5:03)
8. "Beatrice" (5:48)
9. "I Will Wait For You" (6:48)

== Personnel ==
- Piano – Vigleik Storaas
- Double bass – Mats Eilertsen
- Drums – Per Oddvar Johansen

== Credits ==
- Mastered by Jan Erik Kongshaug
- Mixed by Jan Erik Kongshaug
- Recorded by Jan Erik Kongshaug (tracks 1–8), Thomas Hukkelberg (track 9)

== Notes ==
- Recorded May 21, 2011 at Rainbow Studio, Oslo, except track 9 recorded May 4, 2010 at Festiviteten, Eidsvoll
- Mixed and mastered April 24 and July 31, 2012
