= Notice (album) =

1981 studio album by Thorgeir Stubø

Studio album by Thorgeir Stubø Bjørn Alterhaug Ernst-Wiggo Sandbakk Terje Bjørklund Henning Gravkrok
- Released: 1981
- Recorded: Nidaros Studio, Trondheim
- Genre: Jazz
- Length: 48:17
- Label: Odin Records
- Producer: Jan Erik Kongshaug

Thorgeir Stubø chronology
Notice (1981)	Live at Jazz Alive (1983)

Notice (released 1981 in Norway by Odin Records - ODIN LP 01) is a studio album (LP) by the Norwegian guitarist Thorgeir Stubø awarded Spellemannprisen 1981, as the Jazz album of the year.

== Critical reception ==
This is the first album by Thorgeir Stubø, and was released in 1981. He picked a handful of Northern Norwegian jazz musicians, along with saxophonist Henning Gravrok, bassist Bjørn Alterhaug, pianist Terje Bjørklund and the young drummer Ernst-Wiggo Sandbakk, and delivered an album of music that he later described as "light Chick Corea inspired jazz". Paradoxically enough, this might be the most modern Stubø record, in the sense that there are clear elements of jazz rock inspiration for several of the compositions.

== Track listing ==
A side

1. «Mickey Finn» (7:10)
  (Thorgeir Stubø)
2. «Ole Jacob's Ide» (5:55)
  (Bjørn Alterhaug)
3. «The Song Is You» (6:35)
  (Kern-Hammerstein)

B side

1. «Søndre Gt.11» (9:10)
  (Terje Bjørklund)
2. «I Know You Care» (4:15)
  (Duke Pearson)
3. «Notice» (3:45)
  (Thorgeir Stubø)
4. «Mood» (1:40)
  (Thorgeir Stubø)

== Personnel ==
- Thorgeir Stubø - guitar
- Terje Bjørklund - piano & electric piano
- Henning Gravkrok - tenor saxophone & soprano saxophone
- Bjørn Alterhaug - double bass
- Ernst-Wiggo Sandbakk - drums & percussions

== Credits ==
- Recorded at Nidaros Studio
- Mixed at Nidaros Studio
- Cover by Vegar Werner
- Design by Bjørn Rybakken
- Photography by Ivar Mølsknes
- Produced & Engined by Jan Erik Kongshaug
