= Notice (disambiguation) =

A notice is a requirement in law that parties be aware of legal processes affecting their rights, obligations, or duties.

Notice may also refer to:

== Common uses ==
- Notice, a comment, remark or observation
- Previous notice, a concept in parliamentary procedure affecting some motions

== People ==
- Horace Notice (born 1957), an English boxer of the 1980s

== Arts, entertainment, and media ==
=== Music ===
- "Notice", a song by Gomez from their 2006 album How We Operate
- "Notice", a song by Little Mix from their 2018 album LM5
- "Notice", a song by Ziggy Marley from his 1997 album Fallen Is Babylon
- "Notice", a song by Thomas Rhett from his 2019 album Center Point Road
- "Notice", a song by Diana Vickers from her album, Songs from the Tainted Cherry Tree
- "Notice", a song by Moe Shop from their 2018 EP Moe Moe
- Notice (album)

=== Other uses in arts, entertainment, and media ===
- Notice, a review of a play, film or performance
- "Notice", a poem by Patti Smith from her 1973 book Witt
- Notices of the American Mathematical Society or simply Notices, a journal of the American Mathematical Society
