= Open Ears =

2010 studio album by Vigleik Storaas Septet

Studio album by Vigleik Storaas Septet
- Released: 20 September 2010
- Recorded: January 5, 2010 at Rainbow Studio, Oslo
- Genre: Jazz
- Length: 56:17
- Label: Inner Ear/Musikkkoperatørene

Vigleik Storaas chronology
Now (2010)	Open Ears (2010)	Epistel No 5 (2012)

Open Ears (released September 20, 2010 by the label Inner Ear/Musikkkoperatørene - INEA 08) is a studio album by Vigleik Storaas Septet.

Professional ratings
Review scores
Source	Rating
Nettavisen	4/6 stars

== Reception ==
The review by Tor Hammerø of the Norwegian electronic newspaper Nettavisen awarded the album four out of six.

Reviewer Erling Wicklund of the Norwegian radio broadcasting NRK states:

"... And bandleader Vigleik Storaas is himself delightfully impossible to classify and diverse, both as pianist and composer. So then you just have to enjoy the septet-jazz rebirth in Norway..."

== Track listing ==
1. «Number One» (5:25)
2. «Fort Gaelic» (4:38)
3. «Haunting» (6:39)
4. «Cicada» (6:21)
5. «Reminiscing» (6:36)
6. «Every Now And Then» (8:02)
7. «Second Thought» (8:05)
8. «TTW» (5:49)
9. «Open Ears #1» (4:42)

== Personnel ==
- Tore Johansen - trumpet and flugelhorn
- Jukka Perko - alt and soprano saxophone
- Tore Brunborg - tenor saxophone and flute
- Øyvind Brække - trombone
- Vigleik Storaas - piano
- Mats Eilertsen - double bass
- Per Oddvar Johansen - drums

== Credits ==
- Mastered by Jan Erik Kongshaug
- Mixed by Jan Erik Kongshaug
- Recorded by Jan Erik Kongshaug

== Notes ==
- Recorded and mixed 5 and 6 January 2010 at Rainbow Studio, Oslo
