= Terje Venaas =

Norwegian jazz musician (1947–2025)

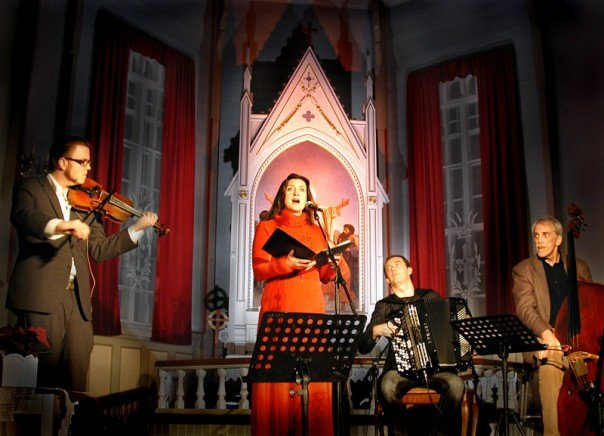
- Ola Kvernberg, Ingeborg Hungnes, Stian Carstensen and Terje Venaas perform 'Toner fra Romsdal' at Vågøy church 2006.

Background information
- Born: 30 March 1947; Molde, Norway
- Origin: Norway
- Died: April 2025 (aged 78)
- Genres: Jazz
- Occupation: Musician
- Instrument: Upright bass
- Labels: Odin

Terje Venaas (30 March 1947 – April 2025) was a Norwegian jazz musician (upright bass), known from dozens of recordings and a number of international collaborations.

== Life and career ==
Venaas started playing music within several local bands in the Molde area from 1962, among others within his brother's Åge Venås Orchestra (including Geir Schumann piano and Svein Jens Thorsø). He debuted on Moldejazz in 1967, and moved to Oslo where he joined the music scene Club 7 (1967–). There he started performing with musicians like Jan Garbarek, Espen Rud and Carl Magnus Neumann, and debuted on record with Terje Rypdal in 1968.

He was one of the most prominent Norwegian jazz artists, recording with international jazz greats as within Per Husby Trio featuring Chet Baker (The improviser, Cadence Jazz Records), and performed with Dexter Gordon (Club 7, 1972), Toots Thielemans (1986), Michel Petrucciani (Kongsberg Jazz Festival, 1986).

Venaas was also county musician in Sogn og Fjordane (1988–89), and also collaborated with folk singer Lillebjørn Nilsen with concert tours at home and abroad and recordings, such as "Stilleste Gutt på Sovesal 1".

Venaas died in April 2025, at the age of 78.

== Honors ==
- Gammleng-prisen 1982 in the class Studio
- Drøbak Jazzklubbs Reenskaug-pris 1984
- Buddyprisen 1988

== Discography ==
- 1968: Bleak House, with Terje Rypdal
- 1973: På Stengrunn, with Lillebjørn Nilsen
- 1983: The Improviser, with Chet Baker
- 1984: Live at Jazz Alive, with Thorgeir Stubø
- 1984: Daydreams, with Laila Dalseth
- 1984: The Improviser Chet Baker, within Per Husby Orchestra feat. Chet Baker
- 1986: Rhythm'A'Ning, with Thorgeir Stubø
- 1986: I Hear a Rhapsody, with Totti Bergh
- 1986: Tenor Gladness, with Totti Bergh
- 1986: Travelling Light, with Laila Dalseth
- 1988: Cherokee, with Egil Kapstad
- 1988: Flight, with Thorgeir Stubø
- 1988: Groovin' High, with Per Nyhaug Studioband
- 1988: My Wonderful One (Gemini Records), classics with Magni Wentzel feat. Art Farmer
- 1989: Confessin' the Blues, with Knut Riisnæs
- 1990: String Time, with Louis Stewart
- 1992: Musikken Inni Oss, with Sigmund Groven
- 1993: Toner fra Romsdal (Odin Records), with Ingeborg Hungnes
- 1994: Om Desse Steinane Kunne Tala, with Glenn Erik Haugland
- 1999: Portrait of Jimmy Rosenberg, with Jimmy Rosenberg
- 2001: Bjørn Johansen, with Bjørn Johansen
- 2001: Einar Iversen, with Einar Iversen
- 2001: Portrait of a Norwegian Jazz Artist: Bjarne Nerem, with Bjarne Nerem
- 2002: Blåmann! Blåmann!, with Jan Erik Vold feat. Chet Baker
- 2002: Larsen and Loutchek, with Jon Larsen
- 2005: Swinging, with Jimmy Rosenberg
- 2008: Leve Patagonia (Polygram Records), with Ketil Bjørnstad
- 2008: Nattønsker, Sigmund Groven
- 2008: The Best of Jimmy Rosenberg, with Jimmy Rosenberg
- 2009: Portrait of Jon Larsen, with Jon Larsen
- 2011: Lukk Opp Kirkens Dører: A Selection of Norwegian Christian Jazz (Psych, Funk & Folk) 1970–1980

Awards
Preceded by First award in 1982	Recipient of the Studio Gammlengprisen; 1982	Succeeded by Frode Thingnæs, Sveinung Hovensjø and Henryk Lysiak
Preceded by Tore Jensen	Recipient of the Buddyprisen; 1988	Succeeded by Per Husby
