= Krister Andersson =

Swedish musician and composer

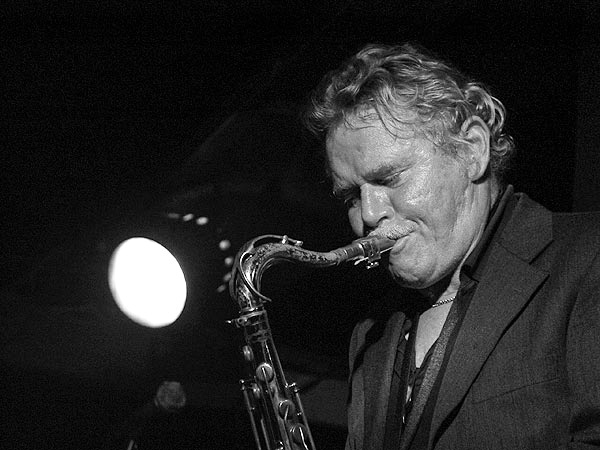

Background information
- Born: 3 May 1951 (age 74); Eskilstuna, Sweden
- Origin: Sweden
- Genres: Jazz, classical music
- Occupations: Musician, composer
- Instruments: Saxophone, clarinet
- Labels: Flash Music; Dragon Records

Krister Andersson (born 3 May 1951 in Eskilstuna, Sweden) is a Swedish musician (tenor saxophone, alt saxophone and clarinet) and composer.

== Career ==
Anderson started his professional career at the age of 16 as a clarinetist in a military band, and at the same time played saxophone in dance bands. He was originally trained in classical music as a clarinet soloist at Kungliga Musikhögskolan (Royal College of Music) in Stockholm. During the early part of the 1970s, he starred as clarinet soloist in the Jeunesses Musicales World Orchestra, led by the conductor Leonard Bernstein. Later, he was influenced by Bernt Rosengren, John Coltrane and Joe Henderson, and he turned to jazz, and early in his jazz career he participated on two live album releases with the Norwegian guitarist Thorgeir Stubø.

Andersson has twice been awarded the jazz magazine Orkesterjournalen's golden disc for best jazz recording. He has also received numerous awards such as Christer Boustedt's and Börje Fredriksson's scholarships, to name a few.

Despite his success as clarinetist, it was as saxophonist that he gained attention in the late 1970s, when he was active in Umeå and played tenor saxophone with the Umeå Big Band. In the Stockholm area, he was later in the Gugge Hedrenius Band, Uppsala Chamber Soloists and Frösunda Wind Quintet in 1979 before he became a member of Egil "Bop" Johansen's Jazz Incorporated.

Andersson is involved in a large number of jazz projects in the Nordic countries and in Tanglewood, Massachusetts. He leads his Krister Andersson Quartet and often collaborates as guest soloist in other constellations. He is regarded as a brilliant improviser and plays with a modern neo-bop style and is still a sought after classic soloist.

== Selected discography ==
=== Solo albums ===
- 1986: And Friends (Dragon Records)
- 1993: About Time (Flash Music)
- 2002: Catching the Moment (Dragon Records)
- 2010: Live (Do Music Records)

=== As sideman ===
With Jazz Incorporated

- 1979: Cornelis Vreeswijk - Jazz Incorporated (Zarepta Records)
- 1980: Live At Fasching (Caprice Records)
- 1982: Walkin' On (Dragon Records), recorded live

With Thorgeir Stubø

- 1985: Flight (Hot Club Records), live recordings from 1983
- 1986: Rhythm'a'ning (Cadence Jazz Records), live in Tromsø

With Esko Rosnell Quartet

- 1988: Malecón (Kompass Records), featuring Krister Andersson

With Bernt Rosengren's Summit Meeting

- 1993: Bent's Jump (Dragon Records) – live recording at Bent J

With The Ulf Sandberg Quartet

- 1993: Ulf Sandberg Quartet (Acid Jazz)

With Bosse Broberg

- 1995: Regni (Phono Suecia)
- 2002: Conspiracy in Flat Five (Phono Suecia)

With Georg Riedel

- 2008: Wolfgang on My Mind (Phono Suecia)

With DUOJ (Cecilia Jonshult - vocals and Lars Jonshult - bass)

2010: Betraktelser (Gason Jazz)
