= 1910 in Norwegian music =

The following is a list of notable events and releases of the year 1910 in Norwegian music.

== Deaths ==
July

- 21 – Johan Selmer (66), composer and conductor.

== Births ==
February

- 14 – Leif Juster, comedian, singer and actor (died 1995).

May

- 3 – Sigbjørn Bernhoft Osa, traditional folk fiddler and composer (died 1990).

June

- 3 – Christian Hartmann, composer (died 1985).

October

- 12 – Brita Bratland, traditional folk singer (died 1975).

November

- 14 – Jens Book-Jenssen, singer, songwriter, revue artist, and theatre director. (died 1999).

== See also ==
- 1910 in Norway
- Music of Norway
