= The Improviser =

Live album by Chet Baker
- Released: 1984
- Recorded: August 15 & 30, 1983
- Venue: Hot House and Club 7, Oslo, Norway
- Genre: Jazz
- Label: Cadence Jazz; CJR 1019
- Producer: Bob Rusch, Per Husby

Chet Baker chronology
Mr. B (1983)	The Improviser (1984)	Chet Baker Live in Sweden with Åke Johansson Trio (1983)

The Improviser is a live album by trumpeter Chet Baker which was recorded in Norway in 1983 and first released on the Cadence Jazz label.

== Reception ==
Professional ratings
Review scores
Source	Rating
Allmusic	3/5 stars

The Allmusic review by Scott Yanow states "Baker recorded this Cadence LP in Norway, backed by a pair of fine Norwegian trios that in both cases include pianist Per Husby. ... Although a little loose in spots, this is an excellent date by the colorful trumpeter".

== Track listing ==
1. "Margarine" (Hal Galper) – 9:35
2. "Polka Dots and Moonbeams" (Jimmy Van Heusen, Johnny Burke) – 8:15
3. "Beatrice" (Sam Rivers) – 8:55
4. "Gnid" (Tadd Dameron) – 10:25
5. "Night Bird" (Galper) – 13:25
- Recorded in Oslo, Norway at the Hot House on August 15, 1983 (tracks 4 & 5) and at Club 7 on August 30, 1983 (tracks 1–3).

== Personnel ==
- Chet Baker – trumpet
- Per Husby – piano
- Bjørn Kjellemyr (tracks 4 & 5), Terje Venaas (tracks 1–3) – bass
- Ole Jacob Hansen (tracks 1–3), Espen Rud (tracks 4 & 5) – drums
