= Flight (Thorgeir Stubø album) =

Notice

Studio album by Thorgeir Stubø
- Released: 1985
- Recorded: June 9 and 10, 1985 in Rainbow Studios, Oslo
- Genre: Jazz
- Length: 53:18
- Label: Hot Club Records
- Producer: Thorgeir Stubø, Jan Erik Kongshaug & Jon Larsen

Thorgeir Stubø chronology
Everything We Love (1984)	Notice (1985)	Rhythm'a'ning (1986)

Flight (released 1988 in Oslo, Norway, by Hot Club Records - HCR 25) is a studio album (LP) by the Norwegian guitarist Thorgeir Stubø, including two live recordings.

== Review ==
This is the fourth album by Thorgeir Stubø, released in 1985, and is a mixture of studio and live recordings from a concert in Tromsø, and consists of a variety of lineups. The record is perhaps the Stubø album that has the greatest diversification of styles. In addition to the traditional hard bop format, presented through songs like "Swinging till the girls come home" (Oscar Pettiford), "Nica's Dream" (Horace Silver), Stubø presents more modern, Pat Martino oriented influence through his own, more modal-based compositions, "Flight" and "For Wes and Pat". On Wayne Shorter's classic "Fall", there is also used synthesizer, and electric piano is also represented on a track. Fred Lacey's gorgeous ballad "Theme for Ernie" as made famous by Coltrane, also interpreted the great trio with acoustic guitars, like "Chelsea Bridge" (Strayhorn) and "Autumn in New York" (Duke).

== Track listing ==
A side

1. "Flight" (9:50)
  (Thorgeir Stubø)
2. "Fall" (4:34)
  (Wayne Shorter)
3. "Swingin' Till The Girls Come Home" (9:38)
  (Oscar Peterson)
4. "Autumn In New York» (2:25)
  (Vernon Duke)

B side

1. "For Wes & Pat" (6:58)
  (Thorgeir Stubø)
2. "Theme For Ernie" (6:42)
  (Fred Lacey)
3. "Nica's Dream" (7:52)
  (Horace Silver)
4. "Chelsea Bridge" (4:52)
  (Billy Strayhorn)

== Personnel ==
- Thorgeir Stubø – acoustic guitar & electric guitar
- Ivar Antonsen – piano (tracks: A1-A2, B1 & B4)
- Lars Sjösten – piano (tracks: A3 & B3)
- Krister Andersson – tenor saxophone
- Jesper Lundgaard – double bass (tracks: A1 & B1-B2)
- Terje Venaas – double bass (tracks: A3 & B3)
- Alex Riel – drums & percussions (tracks: A1 & B1-B2)
- Egil "Bop" Johansen – drums (tracks: A3 & B3)

== Credits ==
- Producer – Thorgeir Stubø
- Engineer – Arve Hoel (tracks: A3, B3)
- Executive Producer – Jon Larsen
- Liner notes – Mike Hennessey
- Photography by Ole J. Andreassen
- Produced & engineered by Jan Erik Kongshaug

== Notes ==
- Recorded June 9 and 10, 1985, in Rainbow Studios, Oslo. "Swingin' Till The Girls Come Home" and "Nica's Dream" recorded live December 16, 1983, at Prelaten, Tromsø.
