= Thorgeir Stubø =

Norwegian jazz guitarist and composer (1943–1986)

- Born: 12 November 1943; Narvik, Norway
- Origin: Norway
- Died: 22 October 1986 (aged 42) Narvik, Norway
- Genres: Jazz
- Occupations: Musician, composer
- Instrument: Guitar
- Website: jazzklubben.narviknett.no/miljoet/thorgeir_stuboe_bio.htm

Thorgeir Stubø (12 November 1943 – 22 October 1986) was a Norwegian jazz guitarist and composer. He was the father of jazz guitarist Håvard Stubø, jazz singer Kjersti Stubø and theater director Eirik Stubø, and he was the grandfather of electronica musician Mathias Stubø.

== Early life ==
Stubø was born and raised in Narvik, Norway and listened to music on radio from an early age. His attention was drawn to American jazz, especially to the music of John Coltrane, Tal Farlow, Wes Montgomery, Jimmy Raney and Jim Hall, all of which was important for his early musical development. Stubø started playing the guitar in Narvik, but moved to Oslo to get his education in the 1960s. He studied philology at the University of Oslo and got a masters with the German language as main focus. On the Oslo jazz scene, he was soon recognised for his expressive guitar style. He was often seen at the student home "Nord Norsken", performing jazz, and he played with up-coming musicians like Jan Garbarek, Knut Riisnæs, Svein Christiansen and Arild Andersen.

Returning to Narvik, Stubø started working at Frydenlund high school as a teacher of language and continued his participation in local music life. He also was a sportsman and a skier, and he hiked the northern Norway scenery as a source of inspiration.

== Career ==
Even though raising a family and working as an ordinary teacher occupied much of his time, Stubø is regarded as the best Norwegian guitarist through all time. His first record was Notice (Odin Records, 1981), with Henning Gravrok (saxophones), Bjørn Alterhaug (bass), Terje Bjørklund (piano) and Ernst-Wiggo Sandbakk (drums), all musicians from northern Norway. It was a soft flowing album with references to Chick Corea's jazz rock style, and was rewarded Spellemannprisen 1981. His next record, Live at Jazz Alive (Odin Records, 1983/1985), was a live recording from the jazz club Jazz Alive in Oslo, with Bernt Rosengren, Egil Kapstad, Terje Venaas and Egil Johansen, some of the best bop musicians in Scandinavia. These two records was released on the Norwegian Jazz Clubs own label, Odin Records.

Flight (Hot Club Records 1983, live recordings from 1983), with Krister Andersson (saxophones), Terje Venaas (bass), Lars Sjösten (piano), Egil Johansen (drums), Ivar Antonsen, Jesper Lundgaard and Alex Riel (drums), is a mixed studio a live recording from Tromsø with different line-ups on the two sets. The album showed the influence of guitarist Pat Martino. By writing letters, Stubø got in contact with the well-known guitarist Doug Raney, son of the legendary Jazz guitarist Jimmy Raney. This led to the album Everything We Love (Hot Club, 1983/1985), with Doug Raney, Ole Jacob Hansen and Jesper Lundgaard

Stubø released his two last records on the label Cadence Jazz Records. First came the LP Rhythm'a'ning (Cadence Jazz Records, 1986), live in Tromsø with Krister Andersson, Lars Sjösten, Terje Venaas and Egil Johansen (Cadence Jazz Records, 1986). This release included many tunes by John Coltrane. The End of a Tune (Cadence Jazz Records, 1988), with Art Farmer, Doug Raney, Ivar Antonsen, Jesper Lundgaard and Ole Jacob Hansen, marked the end of his career.

== Honors ==
- Awarded the "Spellemannprisen" 1981 in the class Jazz, for the record Notice
- Awarded the Norwegian "Buddyprisen" Jazz Prize of honor 1986
- The Thorgeir Stubø Memorial Fund was established in 1987, and annually awards the "Stubøprisen" for important contributors to the Northern Norwegian jazz.

== Discography ==
- 1981: Notice (Odin)
- 1984: Live at Jazz Alive (Odin), live in Oslo
- 1985: Everything We Love (Hot Club), with Doug Raney
- 1985: Flight (Hot Club), live recordings from 1983
- 1986: Rhythm'a'ning (Cadence), live in Tromsø
- 1988: The End of a Tune (Cadence)

Awards
| Preceded by Frode Thingnæs Quintet | Recipient of the Jazz Spellemannprisen; 1981 | Succeeded by Knut Riisnæs Quartet |
| Preceded by Terje Rypdal | Recipient of the Buddyprisen; 1986 | Succeeded by Tore Jensen |
