= Magni Wentzel =

Norwegian jazz singer and guitarist

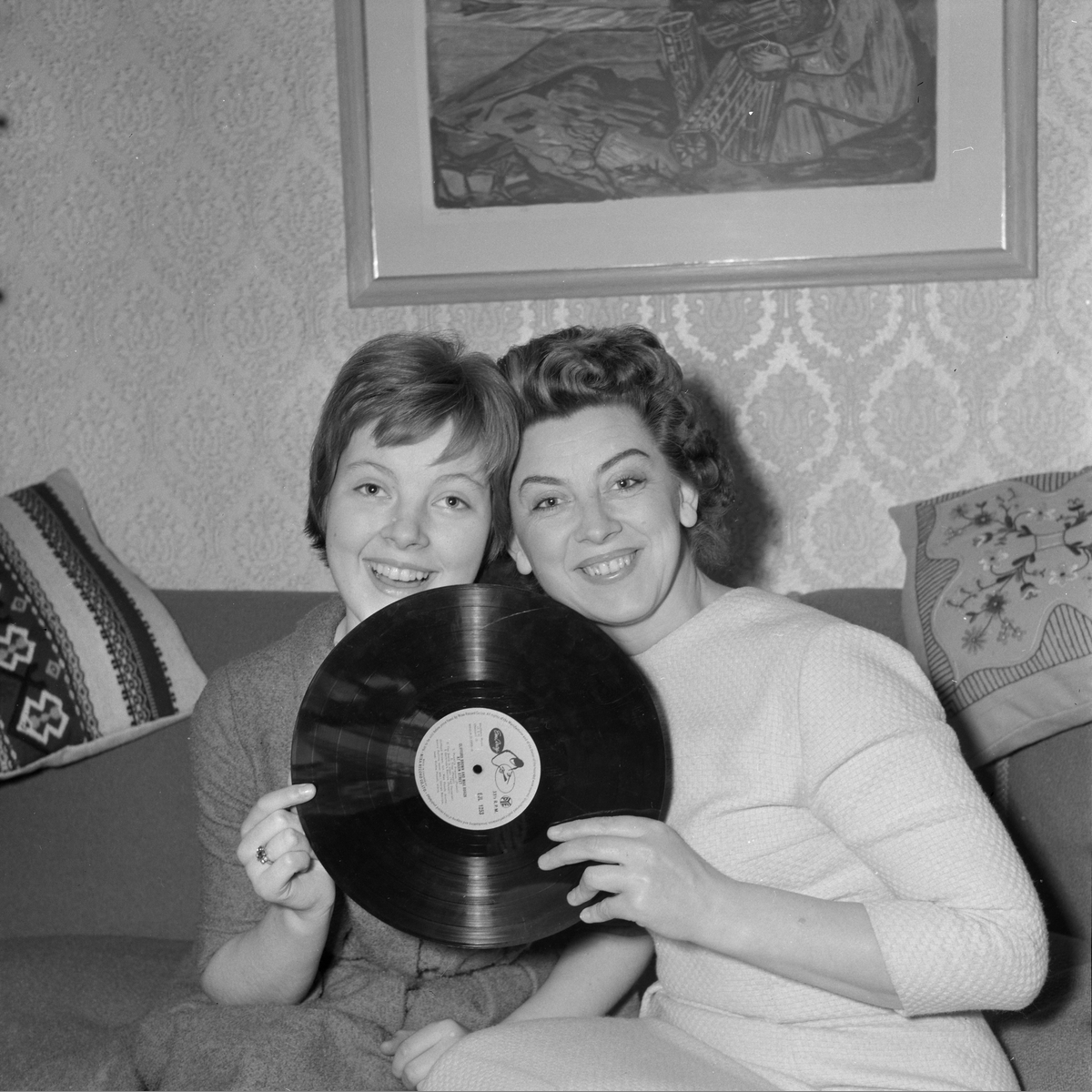
- Magni and Åse Wentzel 1959.

Background information
- Born: 28 June 1945 (age 81); Oslo, Norway
- Genres: Jazz
- Occupations: Musician, composer
- Instruments: Vocals, guitar
- Website: www.magniwentzel.no

Magni Wentzel (born 28 June 1945 in Oslo, Norway) is a Norwegian jazz musician (vocals and guitar), the daughter of musicians Odd Wentzel-Larsen and Åse Wentzel, and known for a number of jazz recordings.

== Career ==
Wentzel started in "Totenlaget Barneteater" (1951). She was trained by opera singers Erna Skaug, Almar Heggen and professor Paul Lohmann in Wiesbaden, took guitar lessons from 1956, and released her debut jazz album That Old Feeling in 1959. Instead of attending the first year of the newly established "Statens operahøgskole" in Oslo, she chose to go on learning classical guitar in Spain (1963), Switzerland and England, and taught jazz song under Tete Montoliu. She played on the Club 7 in Oslo within Geir Wentzel Band, and at the same time she was strongly influenced by Aretha Franklin.

She collaborated extensively with a series of Oslo-based musicians, like within the quartets and quintets including Einar Iversen and Egil Kapstad. Peter Gullin dedicated the album Far, Far Away Where Longing Live to her. Later she worked for Opera Mobile, then as the "mother" in The Tales of Hoffmann by Offenbach.

== Honors ==
- Gammleng-prisen 1988
- Buddyprisen 1998

== Discography ==
=== Solo albums ===
- 1969: Magni Wentzel Plays (Polydor), Norwegian versions of pop songs Frank Mills and Starshine from the musical Hair
- 1975: Guitar And Flute (Polydor), classic classics with Torkil Bye Flute
- 1978: Jeg Synger For Min Lille Venn (VNP), children's album with her mother Åse Wentzel
- 1983: Sofies Plass (Hot Club Records), a famous jazz pieces with Egil Kapstad, Halvard Kausland, Ole Jacob Hansen & Carl Morten Iversen, nominated for the Spellemannprisen
- 1986: All Or Nothing at All (Gemini Records), with Egil Kapstad, Terje Venaas & Egil Johansen
- 1988: My Wonderful One (Gemini Records), classics with Art Farmer, Egil Kapstad, Terje Venaas & Egil Johansen
- 1991: New York Nights (Gemini Records), jazz hits with Red Mitchell & Roger Kellaway
- 1995: Come Away With Me (Gemini Records), jazz standards, with Niels-Henning Ørsted Pedersen & Roger Kellaway
- 1997: Turn Out The Stars (Hot Club Records), varied wipers, among them four from West Side Story, with Roger Kellaway & Mads Vinding
- 2000: Porgy & Bess (Hot Club Records), music by George Gershwin with her own sextet (including Olga Konkova, Nils Jansen, Christian Jaksjø, Carl Morten Iversen & Espen Rud)
- 2002: Divergence (Hot Club Records), jazz and Spanish guitar music recorded 1997, with Mads Vinding & Roger Kellaway
- 2010: Live (Curling Legs), recordings from the club Håndverkeren by NRK, at "Oslo Jazzfestival" 2003, with Jørn Øien, Jon Gordon, Carl Morten Iversen & Espen Rud

=== Singles ===
- 1958: Mamma (En Gutt Har Sett På Meg), with Per Nyhaugs orkester
- 1958: Byssan lull Blues, with Åse Wentzel
- 1959: That Old Feeling/My One And Only Love
- 1959: Augustin, with Åse Wentzel & Willy Andresens orkester
- 1960: Milk Shake/Troll-Rock
- 1970: Walk on My Side/I Want You

=== Collaborative works ===
With other projects

- 1994: Stille Vann, with Torhild Nigar
- 2004: Syng & le – de beste fra 1952–1962, with Åse Wentzel
- 2005: Portrait of a Norwegian Jazz Artist with Erik Amundsen

With various artists

- 1988: The Jazz Sampler
- 1992: Fra En Musikers Dagbok
- 1997: Gemini – The Jazz Sampler Vol. 3
- 2003: Turning Pages – Jazz in Norway Vol. 4
- 2005 Stellar Voyage – Rare Rock Grooves And Fusion From Norway
- 2005 Turning Pages: Jazz In Norway 1960–70
- 2006 Hørt & Uhørt – 28 Diamanter Fra 50-tallet
- 2006 Jazz Collection 1
- 2007 NRK Sessions: Soul, Afro-Jazz And Latin From The Club 7 Scene

Awards
Preceded by Bjarne Nerem	Recipient of the Jazz Gammleng-prisen; 1988	Succeeded by Bjørn Alterhaug
Preceded by Ole Jacob Hansen	Recipient of the Jazz Buddyprisen; 1998	Succeeded by Totti Bergh
