= Elin Rosseland =

Norwegian singer, bandleader, and composer (born 1959)

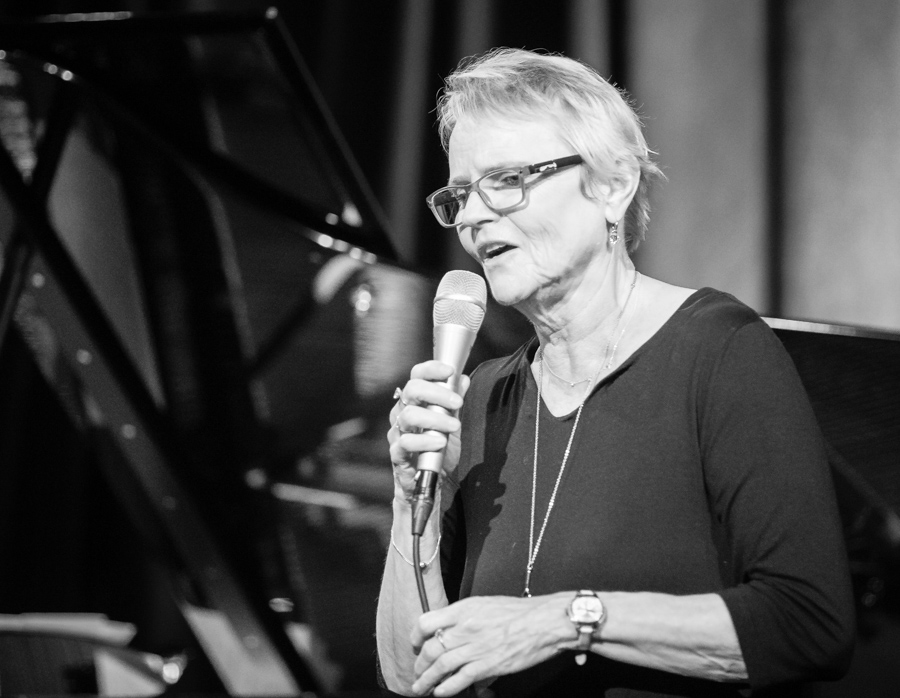
- Elin Rosseland performing in 2019

Background information
- Born: 5 April 1959 (age 67); Norway
- Genres: Jazz
- Occupations: Musician, composer
- Instrument: Vocals
- Labels: Inner Ear; NorCD; Odin Records
- Website: nmh.no/om_musikkhogskolen/ansatte/elin_rosseland

Elin Rosseland (born 5 April 1959 in Norway) is a singer, bandleader, and composer who studied at the Norwegian Academy of Music and is known from collaborations with Vigleik Storaas, Johannes Eick, Sidsel Endresen, Eldbjørg Raknes, Christian Wallumrød, and Johannes Eick.

== Career ==
Rosseland has played with "Stein Eide Band", the Norwegian band "Kix" and the octet "Winds Hot & Cool" (with album in 1984). She early developed her own quintet "Fair Play" based in Trondheim, with the musicians Tor Yttredal, Vigleik Storaas, Johannes Eick and Trond Kopperud. They released the album Fair Play (1989). She joined the band "Søyr" (1986–94), the trio "ESE" with Sidsel Endresen and Eldbjørg Raknes (Gack, Jazzland 1998).

The work Fra himmelen gave her the NOPA Award for the work of the year, for both music and lyrics, in 1996 (released on NorCD 1997, with Christian Wallumrød and Johannes Eick). She also released Moment (2004) in trio with Johannes Eick and Rob Waring, and performed with Knut Riisnæs at Oslo Jazz Festival in a piece where "Oslo Storband" performed the Peer Gynt Suite by Helge Hurum.

Rosseland associated with jazz vocal training at Norges Musikkhøgskole.

== Honors ==
- 1996: NOPA's Award for the work of the year, for both music and lyrics
- 2009: Radka Toneff Memorial Award

== Discography ==
Solo projects

- 1989: Fair Play (Odin)
- 1993: Fair Play (2) (Grappa), featuring Norma Winstone (vocals)
- 1997: Fra himmelen, within "The trio" including Christian Wallumrød and Johannes Eick
- 2004: Moment (NorCD), in trio including with Johannes Eick and Rob Waring
- 2007: Elin Rosseland Trio (NorCD), including with Mats Eilertsen and Rob Waring
- 2009: Jazz Mass (Inner Ear), with Tore Johansen, "Bodø Domkor" and "Bodø Sinfonietta»
- 2009: Standards and Vanguards (Grappa), with Helge Iberg
- 2014: Ekko (MNJ Records), as featured artist with Trondheim Jazz Orchestra
- 2014: Vokal (NorCD)

With Espen Rud

- 1984: Hotelsuite

With Lars Martin Myhre

- 1985: Bak speilet

With "Søyr»

- 1987: Vectors
- 1994: Bussene lengter hjem

With Helge Hurum

- 1987: Fata morgana

With the trio "ESE" (Eldbjørg Raknes & Sidsel Endresen)

- 1998: Gack! (Gack, Jazzland)

With Lars Saabye Christensen

- 1999: Skrapjern Og Silke (Grappa)

With Nils Petter Molvær

- 2005: Er (Sula)

Awards
Preceded by Arve Henriksen	Recipient of the Radka Toneff Memorial Award; 2009	Succeeded by Eldbjørg Raknes
