= Peter Asplund =

Swedish jazz trumpeter (born 1969)

- Born: September 26, 1969 (age 56); Södertälje, Sweden
- Genres: Jazz
- Occupations: trumpeter, singer, composer
- Years active: 1990–present
- Labels: Dragon; Sittel; Prophone
- Website: peterasplund.com

Peter Asplund (born 26 September 1969) is a Swedish jazz trumpeter, singer, and composer. Asplund studied at the Royal College of Music in Stockholm. He has recorded several solo albums and participated as solo artist on records with other artists, such as Lisa Ekdahl, and Viktoria Tolstoy. He earlier performed and toured regularly with Bo Kaspers Orkester.

In 2010, Asplund released an album, Asplund Meets Bernstein, in cooperation with Mats Hålling - a Swedish composer and arranger - and Dalasinfoniettan - a regional chamber orchestra. In 2014, the Konserthuset, Stockholm - the home for the Royal Stockholm Philharmonic Orchestra - presented a concert (available as a video) with Peter Asplund and the Swedish Chamber Orchestra, led by Mats Hålling.

== Awards ==
In 2004 and 2010, Asplund was awarded the Gyllene skivan prize for the best jazz album of the year.

== Discography ==
=== As solo artist ===
- 1995 - Open Mind (Dragon)
- 1999 - Melos (Sittel)
- 2000 - Satch as Satch (Sittel)
- 2004 - Lochiel's Warning (Prophone)
- 2008 - As Knights Concur (Prophone)
- 2010 - Asplund Meets Bernstein (Prophone)
- 2013 - The Christmas Feeling (Prophone)
- 2015 - Aspiration, Home Safe ...and Sound (Prophone)
