= Stranger than Fiction (John Surman album) =

Studio album by the John Surman Quartet
- Released: October 11, 1994
- Recorded: December 1993
- Studio: Rainbow Studio; Oslo, Norway
- Genre: Post-bop
- Length: 64:42
- Label: ECM; ECM 1534
- Producer: Manfred Eicher

John Surman chronology
The Brass Project (1992)	Stranger than Fiction (1994)	Nordic Quartet (1994)

Stranger than Fiction is an album by the John Surman Quartet recorded in December 1993 and released on ECM October the following year. The quartet features rhythm section John Taylor, Chris Laurence and John Marshall.

== Reception ==
Professional ratings
Review scores
Source	Rating
AllMusic	4/5 stars
The Penguin Guide to Jazz Recordings	3.5/4 stars

The AllMusic review by Scott Yanow awarded the album 4 stars, stating, "Surman always sounds relaxed, even on the more heated originals. It's an interesting set of generally introverted music."

== Track listing ==
All compositions by John Surman except where noted.

1. "Canticle with Response" – 6:10
2. "A Distant Spring" – 7:45
3. "Tess" – 6:44
4. "Promising Horizons" (Marshall, Surman, Taylor) – 5:32
5. "Across the Bridge" – 7:55
6. "Moonshine Dancer" – 6:43
7. "Running Sands" – 9:10
8. "Triptych: Hidden Orchid/Synapsis/Paratactic Paths" – 14:43

== Personnel ==
=== John Surman Quartet ===
- John Surman – soprano and baritone saxophones, alto and bass clarinets
- John Taylor – piano
- Chris Laurence – bass
- John Marshall – drums
