= Nordic Quartet =

Studio album by John Surman / Karin Krog / Terje Rypdal / Vigleik Storaas
- Released: 1995
- Recorded: August 1994
- Studio: Rainbow Studio; Oslo, Norway
- Genre: Jazz
- Length: 50:25
- Label: ECM; ECM 1553
- Producer: Manfred Eicher

John Surman chronology
| Stranger than Fiction (1993) | Nordic Quartet (1995) | A Biography of the Rev. Absalom Dawe (1995) |

Nordic Quartet is an album by English saxophonist John Surman recorded in 1994 and released on ECM the following. The quartet features singer Karin Krog, guitarist Terje Rypdal and pianist Vigleik Storaas.

== Reception ==
The AllMusic review by Scott Yanow stated, "The group never really meshes their disparate voices together and few of the spacey (and sometimes meandering) group originals other than 'Wild Bird' are at all memorable. All of the principals have sounded better elsewhere."

The Penguin Guide to Jazz Recordings, however, awards four stars, writing that "there is a compelling logic to the music that overcomes its cool detachment."

Professional ratings
Review scores
| Source | Rating |
|---|---|
| AllMusic | 2/5 stars |
| The Penguin Guide to Jazz Recordings | 4/4 stars |

== Track listing ==
All compositions by John Surman except as indicated

1. "Traces" (Karen Krog, Vigliek Storaas) - 7:14
2. "Unwritten Letter" (Krog, John Surman) - 3:49
3. "Offshore Piper" (Terje Rypdal, Surman) - 2:09
4. "Gone to the Dogs" - 3:58
5. "Double Tripper" (Rypdal, Surman) - 6:18
6. "Ved Sørevatn" (Rypdal) - 8:06
7. "Watching Shadows" (Krog, Surman) - 5:20
8. "The Illusion" (Storaas) - 5:57
9. "Wild Bird" (Krog, Rypdal, Surman) - 7:30

== Personnel ==
=== Nordic Quartet ===
- John Surman – soprano and baritone saxophones, alto and clarinet
- Vigleik Storaas – piano
- Terje Rypdal – guitar
- Karin Krog – voice
