= Gyllene Skivan =

Annual Swedish jazz music award

Gyllene Skivan (Golden Disc) is an annual jazz award given by Orkesterjournalen (OJ), the oldest jazz magazine in Sweden which was established in 1933. OJ established the Gyllene Skivan award in 1954. The Swedish tenor saxophonist, Bernt Rosengren, is the only person to have won the award five times.

== Winners of the Gyllene Skivan Awards since 1954 ==
- 1954 Lars Gullin: Dannys dream - Metronome
- 1955 Arne Domnérus: Rockin’ chair – His Master's Voice
- 1956 Hacke Björksten: On the Alamo – Metronome
- 1957 Bengt Hallberg: Dinah m fl – Philips
- 1958 Harry Arnold: Quincy’s home again – Metronome
- 1959 Åke Persson: Quincy – here we come – Metronome
- 1960 Jan Johansson: Mäster Johansgatan 12 – Megafon
- 1961 Jan Johansson: 8 bitar Johansson – Megafon
- 1962 Bengt-Arne Wallin: Old folklore in swedish modern – Dux
- 1963 Eje Thelin: So far – Columbia
- 1964 Lars Gullin: Portrait of my pals – Columbia
- 1965 Bernt Rosengren: Stockholm dues – Columbia
- 1966 Börje Fredriksson: Intervall – Columbia
- 1967 Arne Domnérus: Mobil – Megafon
- 1968/69 (slogs ihop pga för få inspelningar ’68) Bernt Rosengren: Improvisationer – SJR
- 1970 Jan Allan: Jan Allan ’70 – MCA
- 1971 Bjarne Nerem: How long has this been going on – Odeon
- 1972 Nils "Nisse" Sandström: The painter – Odeon
- 1973 Putte Wickman: Happy new year – Odeon
- 1974 Bernt Rosengren: Notes from the underground – Harvest
- 1975 Eje Thelin: Eje Thelin – Caprice
- 1976 Nannie Porres: Närbild – EMI
- 1977 Rune Gustafsson: Move – Sonet
- 1978 Arne Domnérus & Bengt Hallberg: Duets for Duke – Sonet
- 1979 Nils Lindberg: Saxes galore – Bluebell
- 1980 Jazz Incorporated: Live at Fasching – Caprice
- 1981 Lars Sjösten: Select notes – Caprice
- 1982 Jazz Incorporated: Walkin’ on – Dragon
- 1983 Christer Boustedt: Plays Thelonious Monk – Dragon
- 1984 Tolvan Big Band: Montreux and more – Dragon
- 1985 Rolf Ericson: Stockholm sweetnin’ – Dragon
- 1986 Krister Andersson: Krister Andersson and friends – Dragon
- 1987 Bertil Löfgren: First time – Dragon
- 1988 Åke Johansson Trio: Encore – Dragon
- 1989 Lars Sjösten kvartett: Roots and relations – Dragon
- 1990 Joakim Milder: Still in motion – Dragon
- 1991 Summit Meeting: Full of life – Dragon
- 1992 Peter Gullin: Tenderness – Dragon
- 1993 Krister Andersson: About time – Flash Music
- 1994 Bosse Broberg/Red Mitchell: West of the moon – Dragon
- 1995 Anders Bergcrantz: In this together – Dragon
- 1996 Bobo Stenson: Reflections – ECM
- 1997 Jan Lundgren Trio: Swedish standards – Sittel
- 1998 Per "Texas" Johansson: Alla mina kompisar – Kaza
- 1999 Arne Domnérus & Bernt Rosengren: Face to face – Dragon
- 2000 Patrik Boman: Seven Piece Machine – Arietta
- 2001 Magnus Lindgren: Paradise open – Caprice
- 2002 Per Henrik Wallin: Tiveden – Phono Suecia
- 2003 Esbjörn Svensson: Seven days of falling – Superstudio Gul
- 2004 Peter Asplund: Lochiel’s warning – Prophone
- 2005 Bobo Stenson: Goodbye – ECM
- 2006 Esbjörn Svensson Trio: Tuesday Wonderland – ACT
- 2007 Anders Bergcrantz: About Time – Stunt Records
- 2008 Esbjörn Svensson Trio: Leocucyte – ACT
- 2009 Bernt Rosengren: I'm Flying – PB7
- 2010 Peter Asplund: Peter Asplund meets Bernstein – Prophone
- 2011 Tonbruket: Dig It to the End – ACT
- 2012 Bobo Stenson: Indicum – ECM/Naxos
- 2013 Fire! Orchestra: Exit – Rune Grammofon
- 2014 Daniel Karlsson: Fusion for Fish – Brus & Knaster/ Isabella Lundgren: Somehow Life Got in the Way – Ladybird
- 2015 Per "Texas" Johansson: De långa rulltrapporna i Flemingsberg – Moserobie
- 2016 Ellen Andersson Quartet: I'll be Seeing You – Prophone
- 2017 Lina Nyberg: Terrestrial – Hoob
- 2018 Bobo Stenson: Contra La Indecisión – ECM
- 2019 Per "Texas" Johansson: Stråk på himlen och stora hus – Moserobie
- 2020 Anna Högberg: Lena - Omlott Records
- 2021 Joakim Milder: Singled out by Fate - Apart Records
- 2022 Hederosgruppen: Ståplats - Hoob Records
