= 1995 in Norwegian music =

The following is a list of notable events and releases of the year 1995 in Norwegian music.

== Events ==
=== April ===
- 7 – The 22nd Vossajazz started in Vossavangen, Norway (April 7 – 9).

=== May ===
- 13 – Norway wins Eurovision Song Contest 1995 with the song "Nocturne", performed by Secret Garden.
- 23 – The 23rd Nattjazz started in Bergen, Norway (May 23 – June 4).

=== June ===
- 24 – The 26th Kalvøyafestivalen started at Kalvøya near by Oslo (June 24 – 25).

=== July ===
- 17 – The 35th Moldejazz started in Molde, Norway (July 17 – 22).

=== August ===
- 10 – The 8th Notodden Blues Festival started in Notodden (August 10 – 13).

== Albums released ==
=== September ===
- 13 – Kristin Lavransdatter (Kirkelig Kulturverksted), by Arild Andersen

=== Unknown date ===
H

Morten Halle

- The Eagle (Curling Legs), with Jon Eberson, Bjørn Kjellemyr, and Pål Thowsen

== Deaths ==
November

- 25 – Leif Juster, comedian, singer and actor (born 1910).

== Births ==
June

July

August

- 8 – Malin Reitan, singer.
- 31 – Celine Helgemo, singer and songwriter.

Unknown date

- 9 – Selma French Bolstad, Jazz, folk, and pop singer, fiddler, and composer.

== See also ==
- 1995 in Norway
- Music of Norway
- Norway in the Eurovision Song Contest 1995
