= Ivar Antonsen =

Norwegian jazz pianist and composer

- Born: April 16, 1946 (age 80); Fauske, Nordland, Norway
- Genres: Jazz
- Occupations: Musician, composer, band leader, music arranger, composer, jazz musician (piano)
- Instrument: Piano
- Labels: Ponca Jazz Records, Gemini/Taurus Records

Ivar Antonsen (born April 16, 1946, in Fauske Municipality, Norway) is a Norwegian jazz pianist and composer and had his debut at the Oslo jazz scene in 1967 together with Jan Garbarek, Palle Mikkelborg, Arild Andersen, and Espen Rud.

== Career ==
Antonsen started early playing the accordion and organ, inspired by jazz musician Art van Damme. 18-year-old he came in touch with bassist Bjørn Alterhaug, and they started their first jazz band together in Mo i Rana. He moved to Oslo and studied modern composition at Norges Musikkhøgskole under Finn Mortensen and came in contact with major jazz profiles. All along he was inspired, both as jazz musician and composer, by the piano music of Johann Sebastian Bach and Igor Stravinsky.

In the late 1960s he started his own Ivar Antonsen Trio including Espen Rud (drums) and alternately Terje Venaas, Sture Janson and Bjørn Alterhaug on bass. His strong contribution to guitarist Thorgeir Stubø's album Flight (1985) can be cited as a good example of Antonsen's style.

Antonsen was principal of the "Tromsø Musikkskole" (1975–1977), and later, "Buskerud Musikkonservatorium". Then he relocated to San Diego in US (1985), where he was a music educator and later professor in Music at California State University (1995–2004). Since 2004 he has been associate professor at Norges Musikkhøgskole. With residence in San Diego for 19 years, Antonsen had many interesting collaborations, including with Ravi Shankar's tabla player Abhiman Kaushal, drummer Duncan Moore, guitarist Peter Sprague, bassist Bob Magnusson and pianist Andy LaVerne on the album Dream Come True (2000).

Antonsen's compositions often consist of strong rhythmic patterns, harmonically sophisticated and melodically complex, yet logical. His works include modern jazz, and contemporary classical music. He is highly respected among both European and American musicians and has played with jazz greats such as Jon Christensen, Palle Danielsson, John Surman, Arild Andersen, Ben Webster, Jimmy Heath, Slide Hampton, Art Farmer, and Karin Krog. He established his own quartet in 2004 with Espen Rud, Knut Riisnæs and Terje Gewelt, documented as an EBU radio concert on NRK P2 "Jazzklubben" in 2006 and he subsequently appeared in many other quartets with saxophone players like Frode Nymo, Atle Nymo, and Morten Halle as well as with guitarist Hallgeir Pedersen.

Antonsen is considered one of Norway's foremost jazz pianists, and plays in a modern neo-bop style. His playing has a strong identity and is characterized by a sensitive approach, great imagination, complex harmony/rhythm and technical facility.

== Discography ==
An asterisk (*) indicates that the year is that of release.

=== As leader/co-leader ===
Year recorded	Title	Label	Personnel/Notes
1998	Double Circle	Gemini/Taurus Records	Quartet, with Knut Riisnæs (tenor sax), Bjørn Alterhaug (bass), Espen Rud (drums)
2000*	Dream Come True	Gemini/Taurus Records	Duo, with Andy LaVerne (piano)
2007	Antonsen Big Band	Ponca Jazz	Big Band, with Guests (various)
2010	Dialogues	Ponca Jazz/Musikkoperatørene	Duo, with Vigleik Storaas (piano)
2011*	A Day at the Opera	Ponca Jazz	As Antonsen Hvalryg Olstad Trio; with Stig Hvalryg (bass), Tom Olstad (drums)

=== As sideman ===
- 1985: Flight (Hot Club Records), live recording with Thorgeir Stubø
- 2010: Flight Dec. 17 (Ponca Jazz Records/Musikkoperatørene) with Hallgeir Pedersen, Bjørn Alterhaug, Roger Johansen
- 2011: Dobbeldans (Curling Legs) with Espen Rud Group

== See also ==
- List of jazz pianists
