= Anders Bergcrantz =

Swedish jazz trumpeter (born 1961)

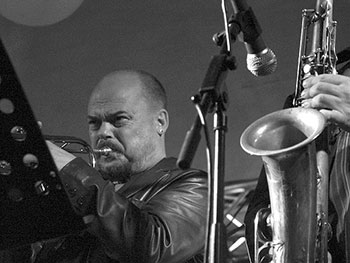
- Anders Bergcrantz

Background information
- Born: Anders Bergcrantz; 5 December 1961 (age 64); Malmö, Sweden
- Genres: jazz
- Instrument: trumpet

Anders Bergcrantz (born 1961 in Malmö, Sweden) is a Swedish jazz trumpeter and composer.

Bergcrantz has recorded several albums as a leader and on many more as a sideman. He has twice been awarded the Gyllene Skivan (the Golden Record) by Sweden's Orkesterjournalen jazz magazine: in 1995 for In This Together, and again in 2007 for About Time. His influences as a trumpeter include Freddie Hubbard, Lee Morgan and Woody Shaw.

== Discography ==
=== As leader ===
- Touch (Dragon, 1986 [1987])
- Live at Sweet Basil (Dragon, 1995)
- In This Together (Dragon, 1995)
- C (Dragon, 1997)
- Twenty-Four Hours (Dragon, 1997)
- In This Together (Dragon, 1999)
- About Time (Stunt, 2007)
- Elevate (Vanguard Music Boulevard, 2020)

=== As sideman ===
With Jan Kaspersen

- Space And Rhythm Jazz (Olufsen, 1987)
- Live in Sofie's Cellar, Vol. 1 (Olufsen, 1991)

With Dave Liebman

- Guided Dream (Dragon, 1985) – with the Tolvan Big Band (recorded in Malmo, Sweden)

With Page One

- Live at Ronnie Scott's (Storyville, 1990)
