= Vigleik Storaas =

Norwegian jazz pianist and composer (born 1963)

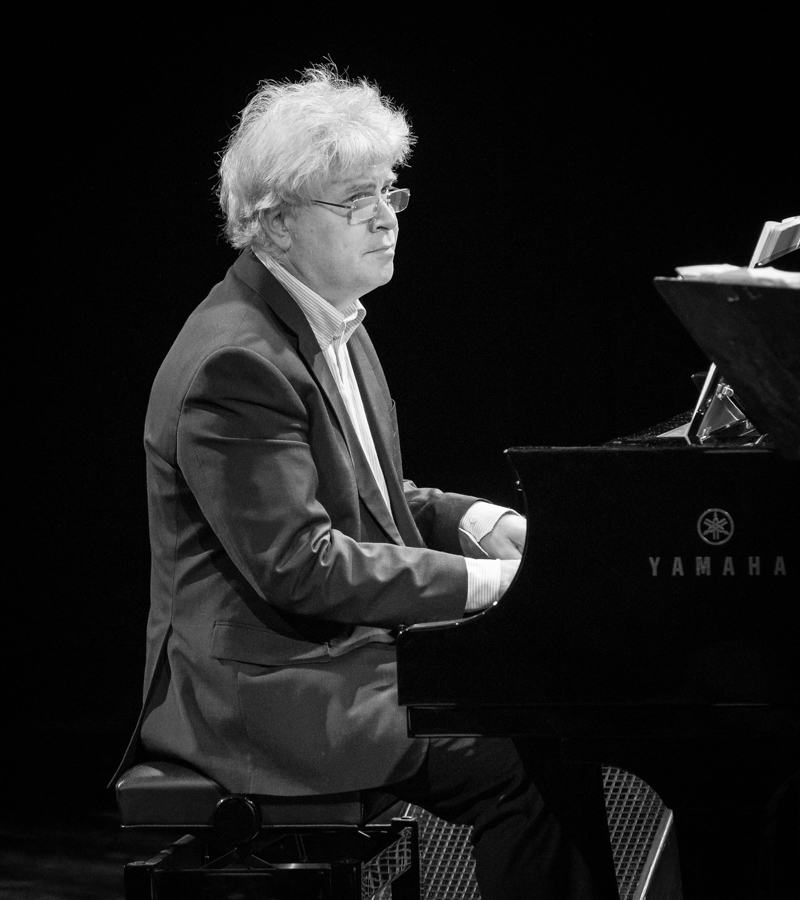
- Storaas at the 2017 Oslo Jazz Festival

Background information
- Born: 2 February 1963 (age 63); Bergen, Norway
- Origin: Norwegian
- Genres: Jazz
- Occupations: Musician, composer
- Instrument: Piano
- Labels: Curling Legs; Inner Ear; ECM Records
- Member of: Vigleik Storaas Trio
- Website: www.vigleikstoraas.no

Vigleik Storaas (born 2 February 1963) is a Norwegian jazz pianist and composer, and the younger brother of composer and bassist Gaute Storaas. He is known from a series of album releases and collaborations with jazz musicians such as Norma Winstone, Karin Krog, Terje Rypdal, Niels-Henning Ørsted Pedersen, Chet Baker, Jack DeJohnette and Warne Marsh.

== Career ==
Storås was born in Bergen, and studied music at the U-Phils High School in Bergen before attending the Jazz program at Trondheim Musikkonservatorium (1982–84), what today is the Department of Music Technology (NTNU), where he was the leader of the Bodega Band (1990–1996), and is now assistant professor.

During the 1980s, Storaas played with the bands Kråbøl, Søyr, Bjørn Alterhaug Band and Fair Play, and was the bandleader of the group Lines (1987–92). With the Bjørn Alterhaug Quintet he played at the Molde International Jazz Festival 2012. During 1992 to 1995 Storaas joined the international jazz profiles Karin Krog and John Surman, and he participated on the record Nordic Quartet from 1994. Here he was recognised as composer both in Norway and internationally. Storaas created his own trio in 1992 with fellow students Johannes Eick and Per Oddvar Johansen; this trio has made several recordings. More recently he has performed in a quartet with students (at NTNU) Tore Johansen (trumpet), Rune Nergaard (bass) and Gard Nilssen (drums).

Storaas has toured for the Rikskonsertene with the "Musikk for fred" (1984–86), "So Ro Godt Barn" (1987–90), "Mennesket i Mengden" (1989–90), "Fair Play" (1989), "All That Jazz" (1993), "Kombinasjoner" (1995) and "Meeting Point" (1997 and 2000), and was named Jazz Musician of the Year by the Association of Norwegian Jazz Musicians in 1996. In 1999 he performed commissioned work Mosaic at Vossajazz, The International Jazz Festival at Vossavangen, Norway. Albums under his own name are Bilder (1995), Andre Bilder (1997), both received Spellemannprisen (The Norwegian Grammy Award), Open Excursions (1999) and Subsonic (2002).

== Honors ==
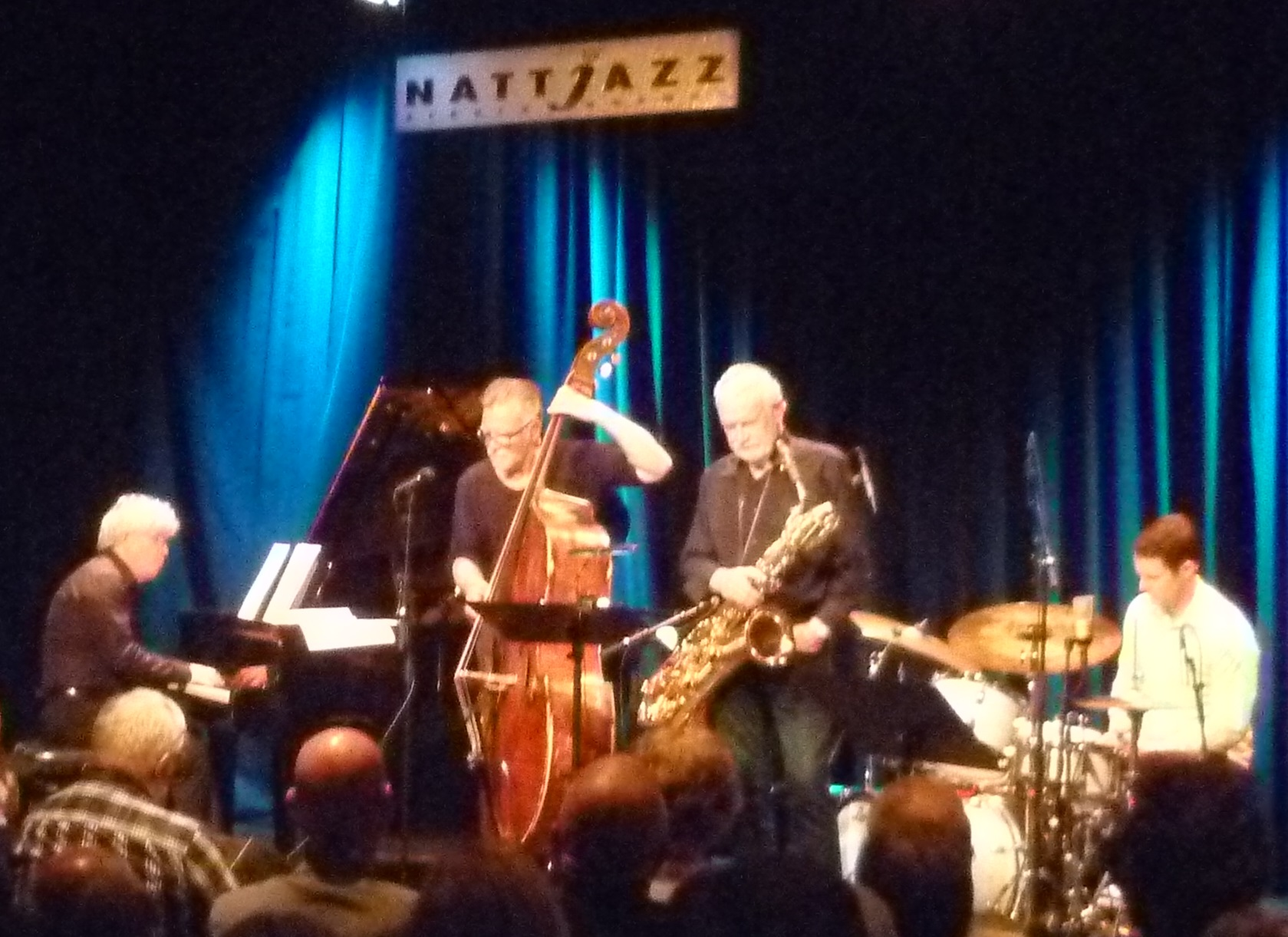
Storaas with Bjørn Alterhaug Quintet at the 2016 Nattjazz.

- Spellemannprisen 1995 in the class jazz for the album Bilder (Vigleik Storaas Trio)
- Jazz Musician of the Year 1996, by the Association of Norwegian Jazz Musicians
- Spellemannprisen 1997 in the class jazz for the album Andre bilder (Vigleik Storaas Trio)
- Gammleng-prisen 2002 in the class jazz

== Discography ==
=== Solo projects ===
Solo Piano

- 1999: Open Excursions, (Curling Legs)

As band leader with Lines (Quartet with Tore Brunborg, Olaf Kamfjord and Trond Kopperud)

- 1989: Lines, (Odin Records), feat. Elin Rosseland
- 1993: Far To Go, (Grappa Music), feat. Norma Winstone

As band leader with Vigleik Storaas Trio

- 1995: Bilder, (Curling Legs)
- 1997: Andre Bilder, (Curling Legs)
- 2002: Subsonic, (Curling Legs)
- 2007: Now, (Inner Ear)
- 2012: Epistel#5 (Inner Ear)

As band leader with Vigleik Storaas Septet

- 2010: Open Ears (Inner Ear)

=== Collaborative works ===
As band leader with Trondheim Jazz Orchestra

- 2006: Tribute composed by Storaas to the 25th anniversary for The Jazz Program in 2004, (MNJ Records)

Piano duets with Ivar Antonsen

- 2010: Dialogues (Ponca Jazz Records/Musikkoperatørene), nominated for the Spellemannprisen 2010 in the class Jazz

Within Excess Luggage (Trio with Steinar Nickelsen and Håkon Mjåset Johansen)

- 2007: Excess Luggage (Park Grammofon)
- 2011: Hand Luggage Only (Parallell)

With Tore Johansen, Jo Skaansar, and Jon Christensen

- 2012: Double Rainbow (Inner Ear)

With Tor Yttredal

- 2015: Chamber (Inner Ear)
- 2017: Space In Between (Inner Ear)

With Hegge

- 2017: Vi är ledsna men du får inte längre vara barn (Particular Recordings Collective)

As sideman

- 1983: Hotellsuite (Odin Records), with Espen Rud
- 1984: Cierny Peter (Odin Records), within Søyr
- 1986: A Ballad (Ponca Jazz) within Bjørn Alterhaug Quintet
- 1992: En Flik Av ... (Studentersamfundet i Trondheim), within Bodega Band
- 1995: Nordic Quartet (ECM Records), with Nordic Quartet (John Surman, Karin Krog and Terje Rypdal)
- 1997: Pieces of Time (Curling Legs), with Jacob Young
- 1998: Rudlende (Curling Legs), with Espen Rud
- 1999: Glow (Curling Legs) with Jacob Young
- 2001: My shining hour (Blue Jersey), with Kjersti Stubø
- 2001: Baritone Landscape (Gemini Records), within John Pål Inderberg's The Zetting
- 2005: Sval Draum (Taurus Records), with John Pål Inderberg
- 2006: Rainbow Session (Inner Ear), with Tore Johansen and Ole Morten Vågan
- 2006: Deloo (Grappa Music), with Kirsti Huke
- 2007: Implicity (AIM), with Orange (Trio with Sondre Meisfjord & Stig Rennestraum)
- 2008: Oslo Calling (Meantime Records), with Karin Krog and The Meantimes
- 2009: Songlines (Ponca Jazz Records), within Bjørn Alterhaug Quintet
- 2009: Kirsti Huke – (Fairplay), with Kirsti Huke
- 2010: My Sister Said (Turn Left), with Håvard Lund
- 2012: Vegen Åt Deg (Øra Fonogram – OF036), with Heidi Skjerve.

== Tours with Rikskonsertene ==
- "Musikk for fred" (1984–86),
- "So Ro Godt Barn" (1987–90),
- "Mennesket i Mengden" (1989–90),
- "Fair Play" (1989),
- "All That Jazz" (1993),
- "Kombinasjoner" (1995),
- "Meeting Point" (1997 og 2000).

Awards
Preceded by Egil Kapstad Trio	Recipient of the Jazz Spellemannprisen; 1995	Succeeded by Bugge Wesseltoft
Preceded by Bugge Wesseltoft	Recipient of the Jazz Spellemannprisen; 1997	Succeeded by Espen Rud Sextett
Preceded by Knut Værnes	Recipient of the Jazz Gammleng-prisen; 2002	Succeeded by Jacob Young
