= Live at Jazz Alive =

Live album by Thorgeir Stubø
- Released: 1983
- Recorded: 1983
- Genre: Jazz
- Length: 54:36
- Label: Odin Records

Thorgeir Stubø chronology
Notice (1983)	Live at Jazz Alive (1983)	Everything We Love (1985)

Live at Jazz Alive (released 1984 in Oslo, Norway by Odin Records - NJ 40012) is a live album (LP) by the Norwegian guitarist Thorgeir Stubø.

== Critical reception ==
Professional ratings
Review scores
Source	Rating
Allmusic	3/5 stars

This is the second album by Thorgeir Stubø released in 1983, and it was a live recording from the club Jazz Alive in Oslo. He collected a band including some of the leading bop musicians in Scandinavia. Bernt Rosengren (tenor saxophone), Egil Kapstad (piano), Terje Venaas (bass) and Egil "Bop" Johansen (drums), was a very hard compelling team as dressed each other very well musically. Repertoire was changed from "Notice" and had now focus on jazz classics.

Allmusic awarded the album 3 stars.

== Track listing ==
A side

1. "My Shining Hour" (9:47)
  (Harold Arlen)
2. "Windows" (8:53)
  (Chick Corea)
3. "Third Plane" (7:35)
  (Ron Carter)

B side

1. "Lazy Bird" (8:21)
  (John Coltrane)
2. "Lament" (8:27)
  (J. J. Johnson)
3. "Changes" (11:33)
  (Thorgeir Stubø)

== Personnel ==
- Thorgeir Stubø - guitar
- Bernt Rosengren - tenor saxophone
- Egil Kapstad - piano
- Terje Venaas - double bass
- Egil "Bop" Johansen - drums
