= Dialogues (Ivar Antonsen & Vigleik Storaas album) =

Studio album by Vigleik Storaas Septet
- Released: September 20, 2010
- Recorded: May 19 & 20, 2010 at Norges Musikkhøgskole
- Genre: Jazz
- Length: 61:46
- Label: Ponca Jazz Records

Dialogues is a studio album with piano duets by Ivar Antonsen and Vigleik Storaas. It was released on October 11, 2010, by the label Ponca Jazz Records (PNJRCD 118)

== Critical reception ==
Professional ratings
Review scores
Source	Rating
Dagbladet	5/6 stars

Piano duo is a challenging form. When Antonsen and Storaas come together and give us an exquisite variety of their own and others compositions, the result is a pleasant experience for the ear. Reviewer Erling Wicklund of the Norwegian radio broadcasting NRK states:

... Duke Ellington and Count Basie have, Chick Corea and Herbie Hancock as well. Therefore, there is great expectation when two giants in the North and West Norwegian jazz do the same: Sets to each grand piano and goes into the challenging jazz pianist dialogue...

The review by Terje Mosnes of the Norwegian newspaper Dagbladet awarded the album dice 5.

== Track listing ==
1. "Whenever" (6:00)
2. "Wiggy" (6:56)
3. "Up and Running" (6:02)
4. "Linjer" (6:14)
5. "In Your Own Sweet Way" (6:52)
6. "Question Asked" (6:13)
7. "Stepping Stones" (4:48)
8. "Modalis" (6:51)
9. "Angel Eyes" (5:45)
10. "All the Things You Are" (6:05)

== Personnel ==
- Vigleik Storaas - piano
- Ivar Antonsen - piano

== Notes ==
- Recorded May 19 & 20, 2010, at Norges Musikkhøgskole
