= Catharina Chen =

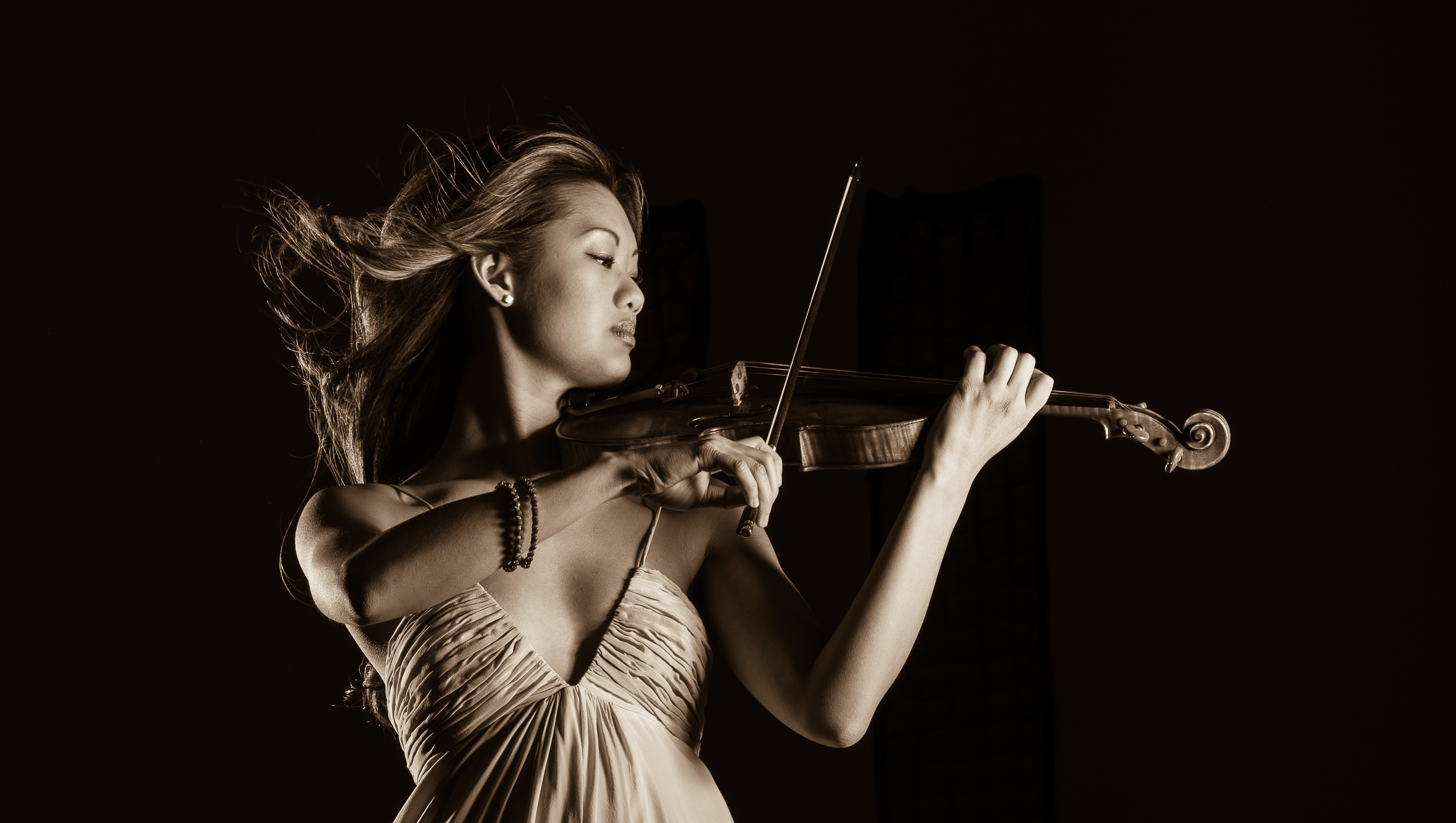

Background information
- Origin: Norway
- Instrument: Violin

Catharina Chen (born 1985) is a Norwegian classical violinist of Chinese ancestry. She has soloed since age 8.

== Life ==
Chen was born in 1985 in Norway. Her father introduced her to the violin when she was five and played solo at age eight. Her tutors include Alf Richard Kraggerud, Stephan Barratt and Eduard Schmieder.

She studied at the Southern Methodist University in Dallas and Temple University in Philadelphia and has a master's degree.

When she was 26 she was appointed to be the concert master at the Norwegian National Opera and Ballet
