= Everything We Love =

Live album by Doug Raney & Thorgeir Stubø
- Released: 1984
- Recorded: 1983
- Genre: Jazz
- Length: 41:17
- Label: Hot Club Records
- Producer: Jon Larsen

Thorgeir Stubø chronology
Live at Jazz Alive (1983)	Everything We Love (1984)	Flight (1985)

Doug Raney chronology
Meeting the Tenors (1983)	Everything We Love (1983)	Blue and White (1984)

Everything We Love is a live album (LP) by Norwegian guitarist Thorgeir Stubø and American guitarist Doug Raney released 1984 in Oslo, Norway by Hot Club Records – HCR 19).

== Background ==
This is the third album by Thorgeir Stubø released in 1984 and presents an interaction with American guitarist Doug Raney, son of bop guitar pioneer, Jimmy Raney. Raney was at this time living in Denmark, and on this album Stubø made Doug Raney bring along top bassist Jesper Lungaard and drummer Ole Jacob Hansen. It was an elegant and perhaps more easily swinging quartet than the previous quintet, Jazz Alive. This time the repertoire also was a bit more conservative with a mix of older standards and bop tunes like "Everything I Love" (Porter), "Half Nelson" (Miles Davis), "Love Letters" (Young), "Get out of town" (Porter) Just Friends (Klenner/Lewis), "We'll be together again" (Fisher/Lane) and "So do it" (Montgomery). The two guitarists clearly show that they have some of the same influences, and they are relatively similar in style. Anyway, it's inequities and Stubø is rougher and a bit more angular in the performance than Raney's slightly smoother style.

== Reception ==
Professional ratings
Review scores
Source	Rating
Allmusic	3/5 stars

The review by Allmusic awarded the album 3 stars.

== Track listing ==
Side A

1. "Just Friends" (John Klenner/Sam M. Lewis) – 4:12)
2. "We'll Be Together Again" (Carl Fisher/Frankie Laine) – 7:27
3. "Half Nelson" (Miles Davis) – 6:22

Side B

1. "So Do It!" (Wes Montgomery) – 5:56
2. "Love Letters" (Edward Heyman/Victor Young) – 6:34
3. "Get Out of Town" (Cole Porter) – 5:07
4. "Ev'rything I Love" (Cole Porter) – 5:35

== Personnel ==
- Doug Raney – guitar
- Thorgeir Stubø – guitar
- Jesper Lundgaard – double bass
- Ole Jacob Hansen – drums
- Executive producer – Jon Larsen
- Mastering – Krieg Wunderlich
