= Wiese (music producer) =

Norwegian music producer, DJ and songwriter (born 1985)

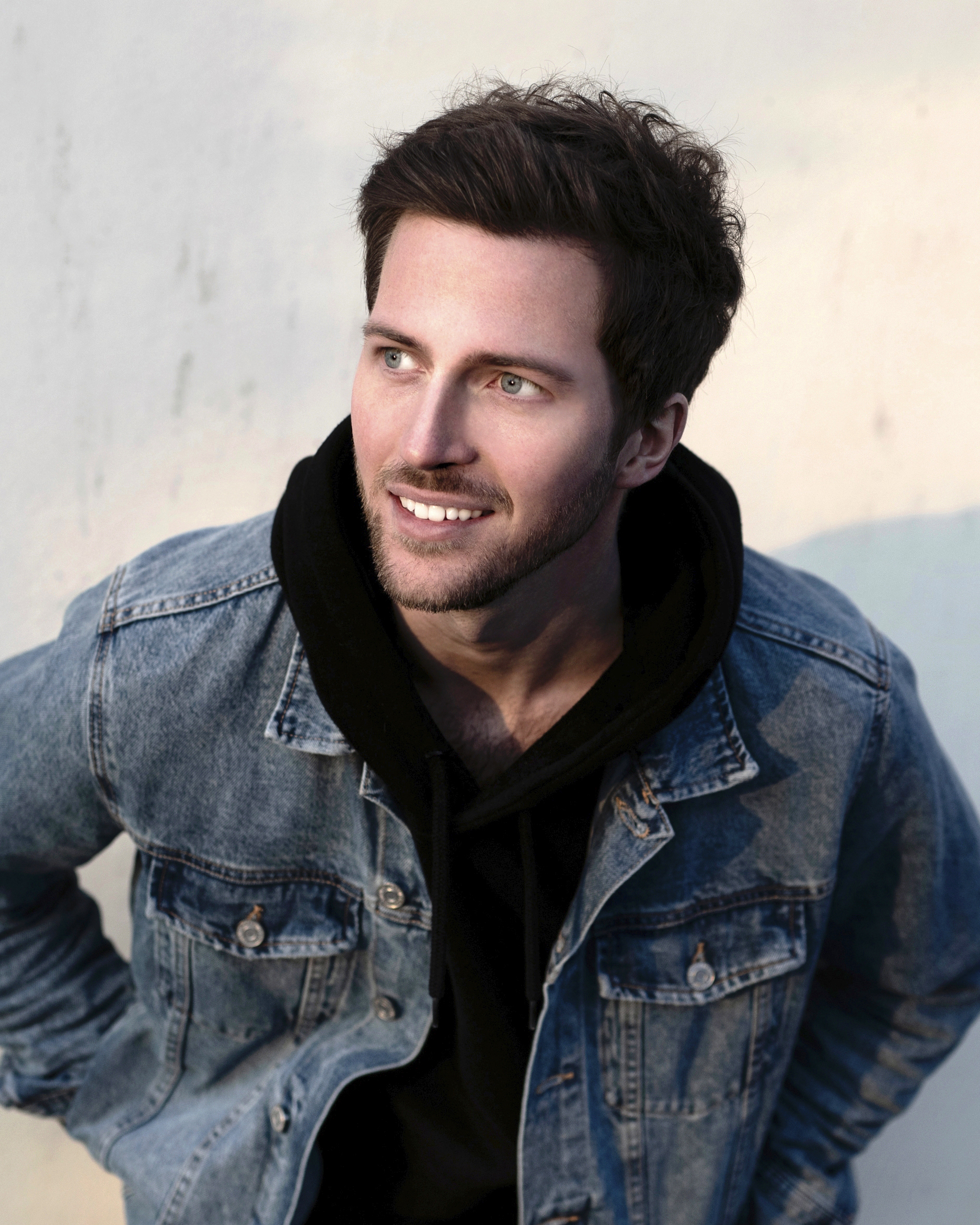

Background information
- Born: 15 March 1985 (age 41)
- Origin: Stavanger, Norway
- Genres: EDM, house, electro house, slap house
- Label: Independent (previously Warner Music Norway)
- Website: www.instagram.com/iamwiese

Trygve Wiese-Haugland (born 15 March 1985), known by his stage name Wiese (sometimes stylized WIESE, pronounced 'vi:se'), is a Norwegian music producer, DJ and songwriter.

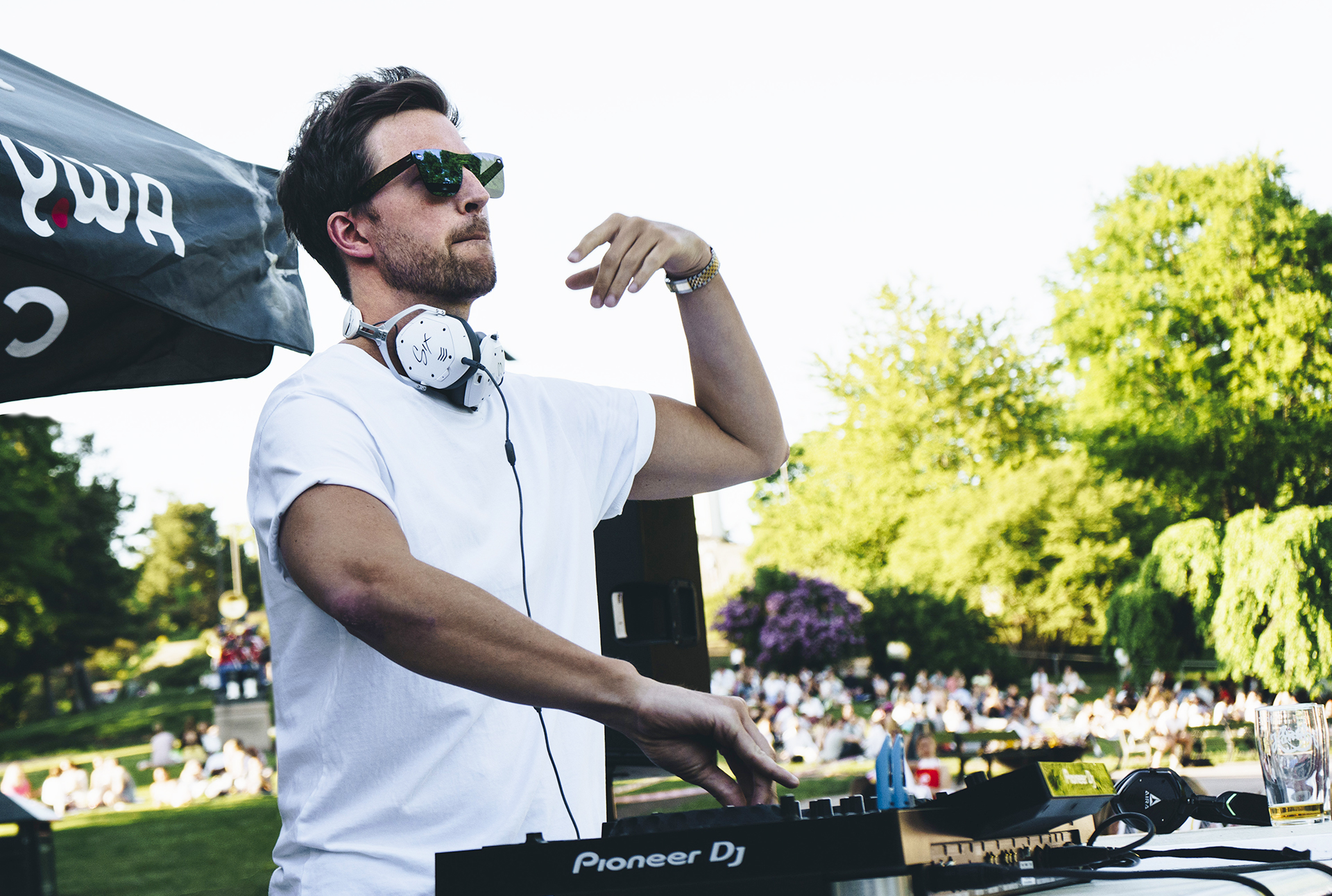
Wiese at St. Hanshaugen, May 2020. Credit: Odin Jæger

Wiese makes commercial electronic music, often in the style of electro house and slap house.

In 2019, Wiese caught the attention of Warner Music Norway, which released Wiese's single 'VIKING'. The song was a hit in Norway, reaching the top of several national playlists, including Spotify's 'Norway Viral 50'. It is also the most played Norwegian football song of all time. Wiese made the song with his fellow producer and friend, Joakim Harestad Haukaas a.k.a. kid joki, who has worked with artists like Zara Larsson, Britney Spears and Seeb.

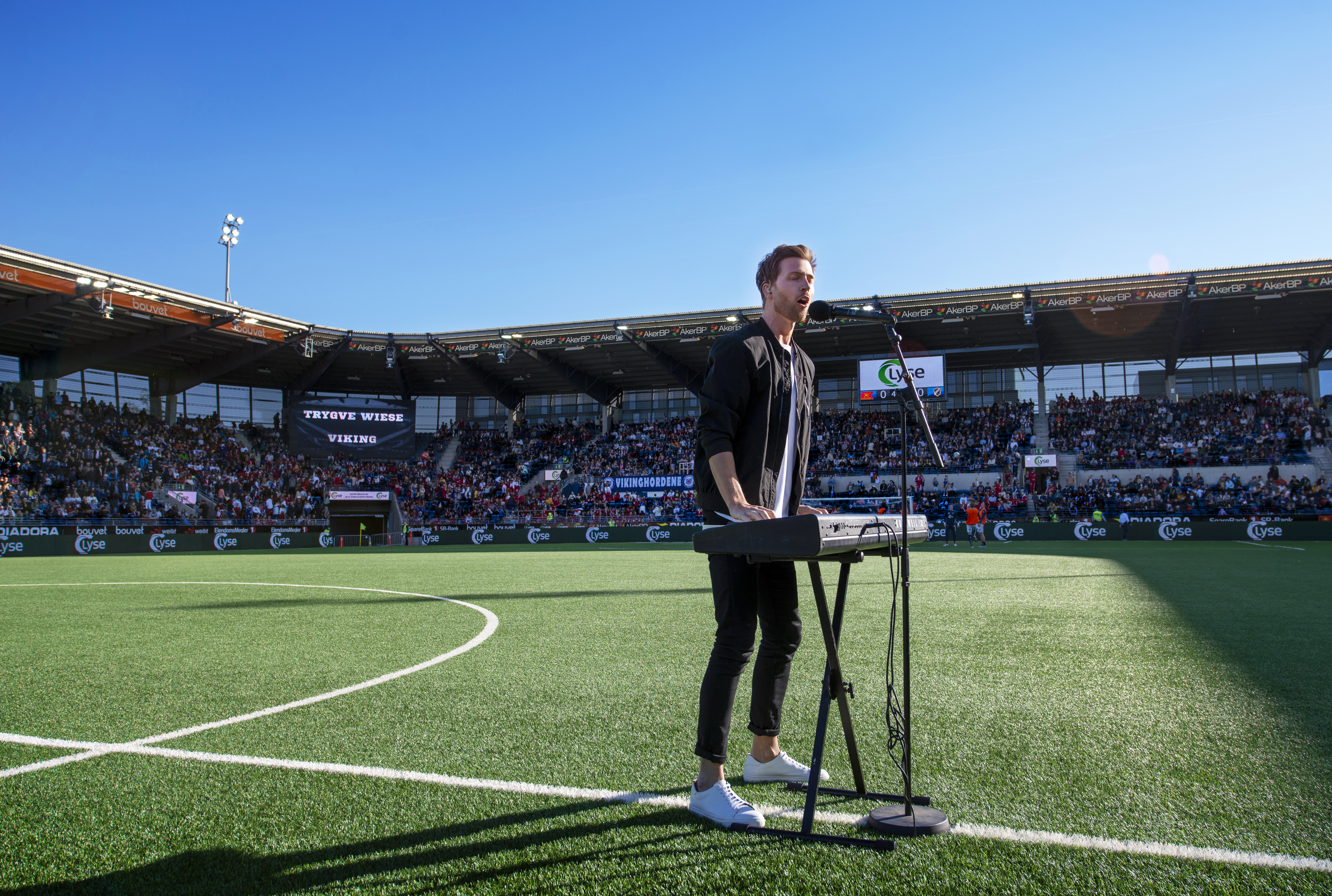
Wiese at Viking Stadion, March 2019. Credit: Lars K. Aalgaard

Wiese's songs have frequently been featured on the largest Spotify editorial lists.

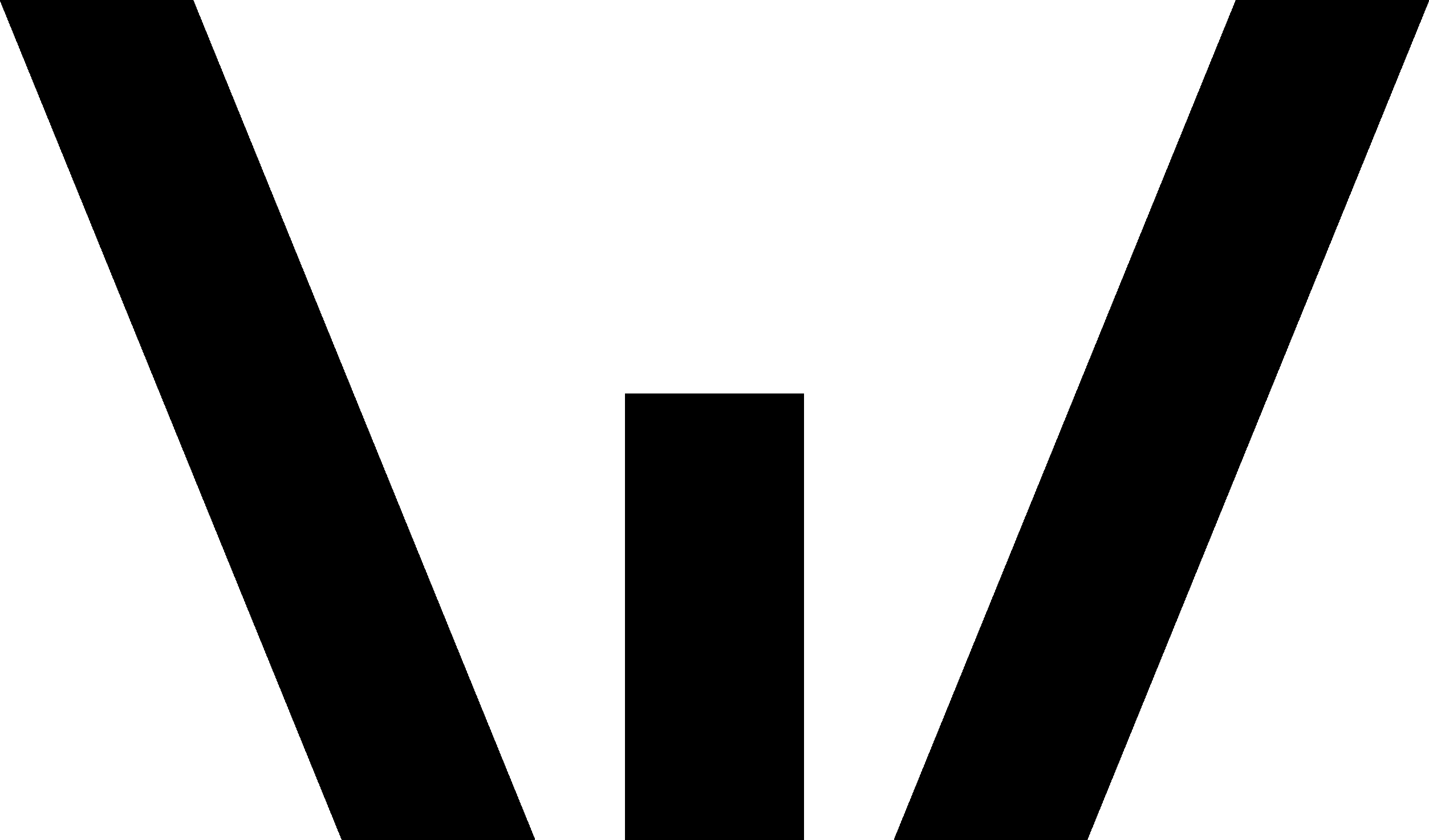
The W logo is prominent in Wiese's graphic expression

Wiese first entered the public scene in 2004 through the single 'Me e Viking' which was first performed in the opening ceremony of Viking Stadion, 1 May 2004. This performance made Wiese the first artist ever to perform at the Viking Stadion. Since then, he has performed at a number of arenas, including the historic Rockefeller Music Hall in Oslo.

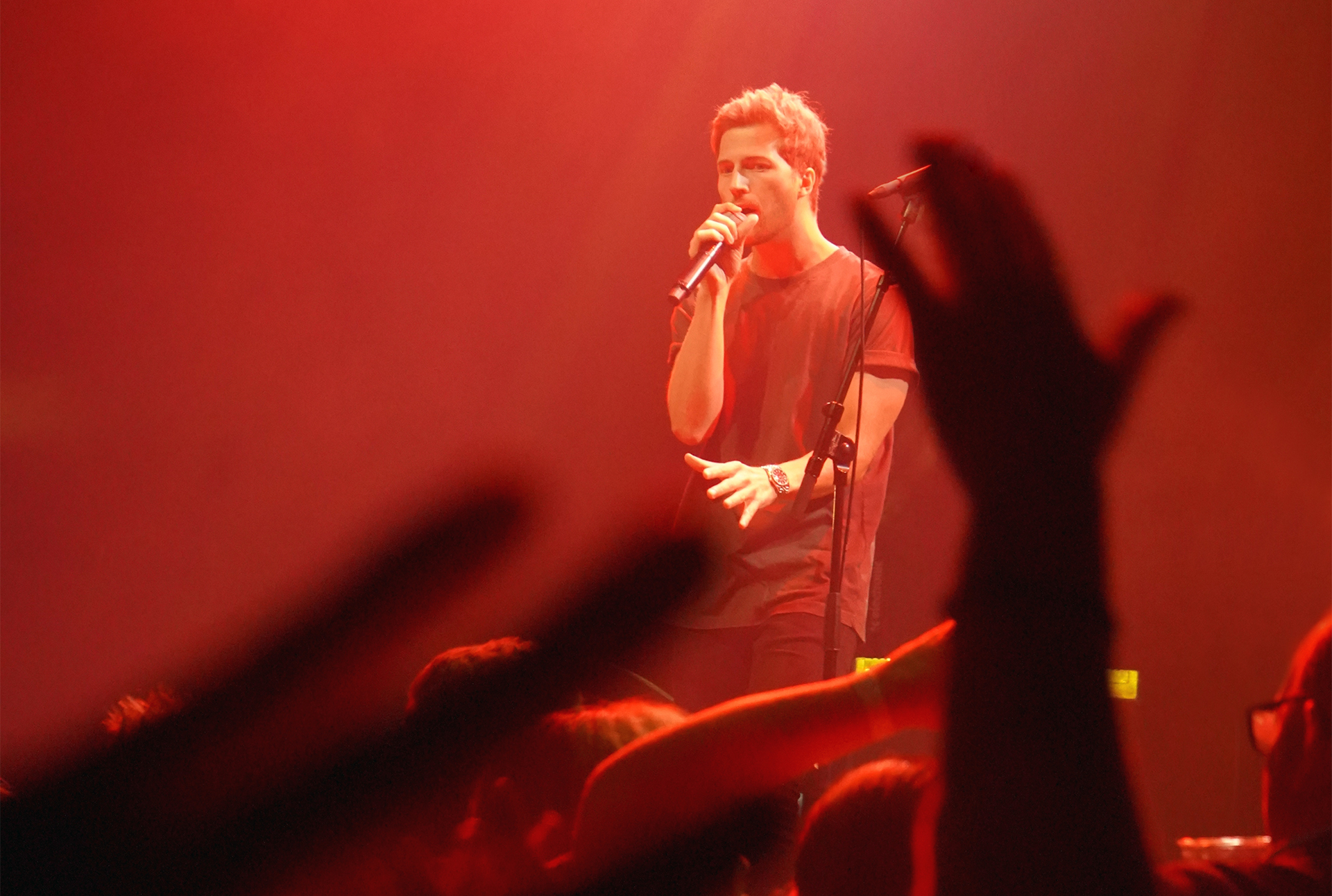
Wiese at Rockefeller, November 2019. Credit: Atle Wilhelmsen

In 2005, the official music video of 'Me e Viking' was first broadcast on Norwegian National TV and in 2005, 2006 and 2007 it was the most played music video on NRK, the Norwegian government-owned TV company. In 2008 it was awarded the 'Best Viking FK Song Of All Time' by the magazine Kick and Viking FK.

== Discography ==
=== Singles ===
- «Find Myself» (2021)
- «Loyal» (2020)
- «Somebody Else» (2020)
- «Never Let Me Go» (2020)
- «I Fell» (2020)
- «How Can I Live» (2020)
- «The Lion Sleeps Tonight» (2019)
- «VIKING» (2019)
- «Giv Akt» (2005)
- «Me e Viking» (2004)
- «Gullguttar på ny» (2003)

=== Official music videos ===
- «VIKING» (2019)
- «The Lion Sleeps Tonight» (2019)
- «Me e Viking» (2004)

=== Albums ===
- «Ingen banke oss på Stadion» (2008)
- «Vikingtiå e tebage» (2004)

=== EP ===
- «No Way EP» (2006)
