= Pompel og Pilt =

Characters from a Norwegian children's TV show called "Reparatørene kommer"

Pompel og Pilt are two characters from a Norwegian children's TV show called "Reparatørene kommer" ("The repairmen are coming"), which was created in 1969 by Arne and Bjørg Mykle. It stars Pompel and Pilt, two rather incompetent repairmen, the moffedille (which vaguely resembles a mop, eats keys, and communicates through howling sounds and cartoon-style balloons), and Gorgon Vaktmester, a janitor who responds to Pompel and Pilt's requests for things to repair with long streams of words rhyming with "repair" and chases after them when they try to escape.

The TV show first aired in 1969, and again in 1973, 1976, 1979, 1985, and 1994. It is a surreal puppet show, and has met a lot of criticism from child psychologists, teachers and others, mainly because of its total lack of logic and pedagogical intent. The reason for the almost ten year intermission, from 1985 to 1994, was that NRK (The Norwegian Broadcasting Corporation) found the TV show to be unsuitable for children.

The series consists of five episodes, of which the moffedille appears briefly in episode 1, and has major appearances in episodes 2 and 3. It is introduced as the protagonists, the repairmen Pompel and Pilt, sit down on it in the belief that it is a tuft of grass, a misconception that is gradually cleared up as the moffedille starts moving. The moffedille then asks for a key (by uttering a talking-bubble containing a drawing of a key). Pilt, who has earlier found a key, shows it to the moffedille, which immediately grabs it and eats it. It then leaves. This concludes the appearance of the moffedille in episode 2.

In episode 3, Pompel and Pilt meet up with the moffedille again. This time, it utters a big SOS inside a talking bubble. By uttering different semi-mysterious speech bubbles, along with rudimentary body language, the moffedille manages to communicate that it has a key inside of it, that it wants Pompel and Pilt to remove. Pompel, intending to do surgery on the moffedille, produces a saw. Pilt, however, does not approve of this, and suggests an alternative approach, where they feed the moffedille a length of rope, and make it dance. After the dance, they pull the rope out of the moffedille. It turns out that a large number of keys are now threaded onto the rope. One of them resembles the key that was swallowed by the moffedille in episode 2. Pilt takes this key, and the moffedille swallows all the others again. The moffedille then leads the way to a locked door. Pilt uses the key to unlock the door. The door opens, and a migrant (another type of fantasy creature) comes out. The moffedille eats the key again, and leaves.
