= Rhythm'A'Ning =

Live album by Thorgeir Stubo Quintet
- Released: 1986
- Recorded: 1983
- Genre: Jazz
- Length: 41:17
- Label: Cadence Jazz

Thorgeir Stubø chronology
Flight (1983)	Rhythm'A'Ning (1986)	The End Of a Tune (1988)

Rhythm'A'Ning (released 1986 in Oslo, Norway by Cadence Jazz Records - CJR 1030) is a live album (LP) by the Norwegian guitarist Thorgeir Stubo Quintet.

== Critical reception ==
Professional ratings
Review scores
Source	Rating
Allmusic	4.5/5 stars

Allmusic awarded the album 4.5 stars.

== Track listing ==
A side

1. «Rhythm-A-Ning» (9:39)
  (Thelonious Monk)
2. «Swingin' till the Girls Come Home» (9:19)
  (Oscar Pettiford)
3. «In a Sentimental Mood» (8:44)
  (Duke Ellington)

B side

1. «I Love You» (10:25)
  (Cole Porter)
2. «Moments Notice» (7:58)
  (John Coltrane)
3. «Hot House» (9:09)
  (Tadd Dameron)

== Personnel ==
- Thorgeir Stubø – guitar
- Krister Andersson – tenor saxophone
- Lars Sjösten – piano
- Terje Venaas – double bass
- Egil "Bop" Johansen – drums
