= Terje Bjørklund =

Norwegian jazz pianist and composer (1945–2024)

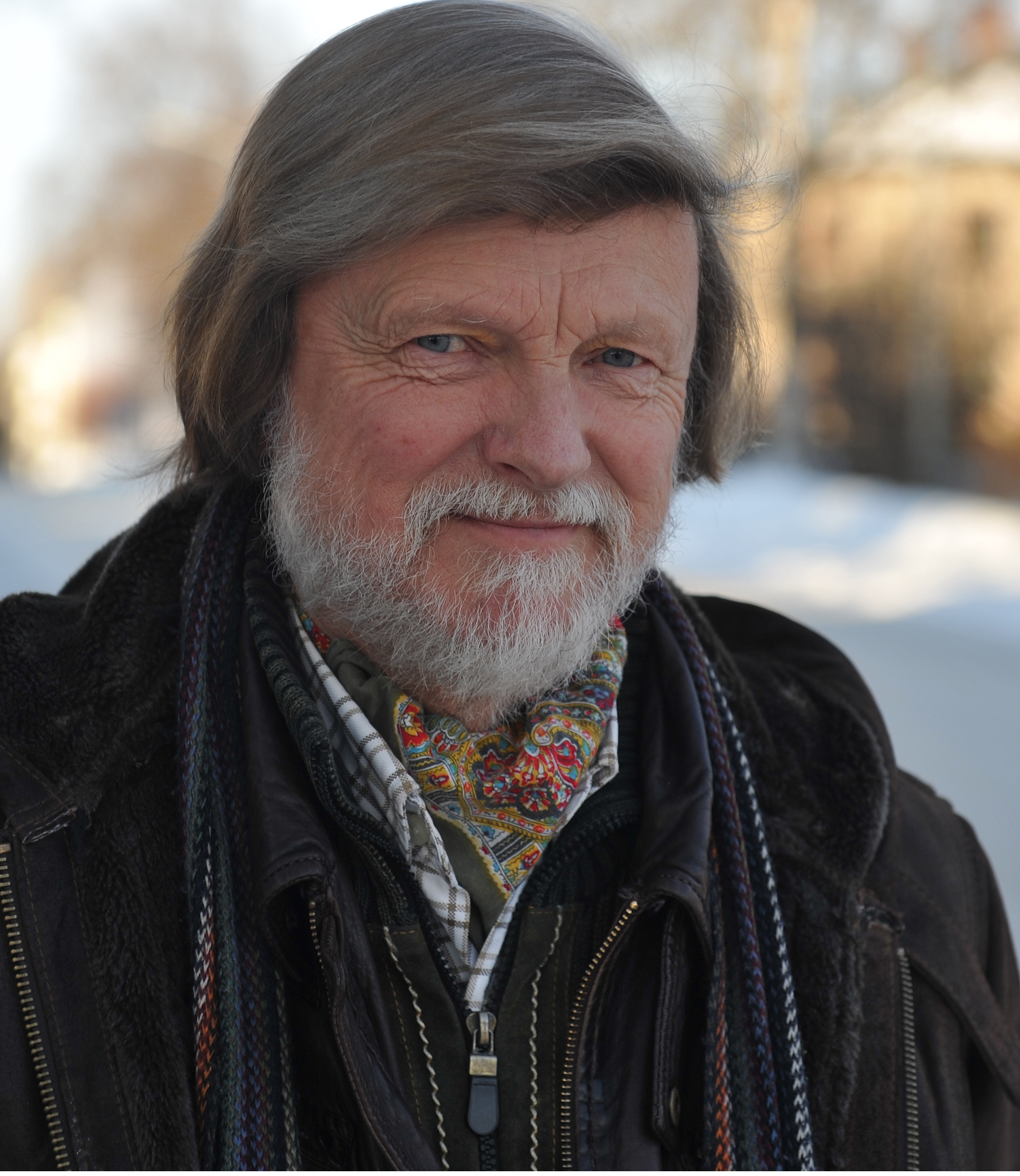

Background information
- Born: 2 January 1945; Narvik, German-occupied Norway
- Died: 3 October 2024 (aged 79)
- Genres: Jazz
- Occupations: Musician; composer
- Instrument: Piano

Terje Bjørklund (2 January 1945 – 3 October 2024) was a Norwegian jazz pianist and composer. He was an active jazz pianist until approximately 1980. From then on he concentrated on composing.

== Life and career ==
Bjørklund was born in Narvik. After obtaining his Master's Degree in Musicology at the University of Oslo in 1971, Bjørklund studied composition with Finn Mortensen at the Norwegian Academy of Music (1971–1973). Bjørklund collected his experiences as a jazz musician in the text book Moderne jazzimprovisasjon. In 1983 he was awarded the Norwegian Jazz Association's highest award: the Buddy prize, for his efforts within Norwegian jazz life.

From 1973 onwards Bjørklund was employed at the Conservatory of Music in Trondheim. In 1979 he initiated the Jazz Program at the Conservatory. The Conservatory is now part of The Department of Music (at the Norwegian University of Science and Technology) and Bjørklund was an Associate Professor there, with the responsibility for courses in composition and music theory.

As a composer Bjørklund was primarily oriented toward serious art music. In many of his works harmony is a main element. The way in which he handled harmony and sound is reminiscent of modern jazz. Bjørklund's music was played at the LOOC Festival "Olympic Winter Land" in Tokyo in 1993. He was the festival composer during the North Norwegian Festival in 1993 and at the Chamber Music Festival Vinterfestspill in Røros in 2004. He was "Artist/Composer of the Week" in the Norwegian national radio station NRK P2 in both 1991 and 2004.

Bjørklund wrote a number of commissioned works for choirs, orchestras and chamber music as well as solo settings. Bjørklund devoted much of his compositional career to writing for string ensembles, a testament to Trondheim’s rich string milieu. Key Bjørklund works include Sarek (1992) and Carmina (2008). The latter was recorded by the Trondheim Soloists and featured on the 2008 release Divertimenti, an album that received three 2009 Grammy nominations.

Bjørklund died on 3 October 2024, at the age of 79.

== Honours ==
- 1983: Buddyprisen

== Works ==
Terje Bjørklund wrote in particular for strings, partially because of the rich string milieu in Trondheim. He also wrote a series of works on commission for chorus, orchestra and various solo and chamber music groups. Among these are: Ole Edvard Antonsen, Christian Lindberg, Oslo Philharmonic Orchestra, The Chilingerian String Quartet, Trondheim Soloists, Marianne Thorsen, Nidaros Cathedral Boys' Choir, Aage Kvalbein, Stig Nilsson, Trondheim Symphony Orchestra and Bjarne Fiskum.

=== Selected works ===
- Sarek (1989); for string orchestra. When recorded with The Trondheim Soloists in 1992, Sarek received the following critique in the American music magazine Fanfare Magazine: "Terje Bjørklund's brief tone poem <…> with vistas of breathtaking expanse and lyrical outpourings that sound, in their strong melodic profile, almost like updated Grieg" This work was played as the opening piece for Anne-Sophie Mutter's USA tour with The Trondheim Soloists in November 2001.
- Carmina (1994); for string orchestra. Carmina was released in 2008 on the Trondheim Soloists' CD "Divertimenti." This CD was nominated for three Grammy Awards in 2009.
- Moréne (1983) and Narvik 2002 (2002); for symphony orchestra
- Magnificat, and Requiem for soloists, chorus and orchestra
- Arctos (1993); violin concerto
- Frøken Victoria' (1992); opera – based on Knut Hamsun's novel "Victoria.”

In the last few years of his life, Bjørklund also composed two full-evening so-called "crossover works":

- Norwegian Sanctus (2006) for jazz soloists, chorus and chamber orchestra had its premiere at the Molde Jazz Festival in 2006. It was also performed during St. Olav Festival in Trondheim the same year and during the Oslo International Church Music Festival in 2009.
- The Wedding (2009) written for jazz soloists and chamber orchestra was a commission from the Trondheim Jazz Festival on the occasion of the 30th anniversary of the founding of the Jazz Program at the Conservatory of Music in Trondheim.
- Bjørklund wrote a violin concerto, commissioned by the Trondheim Symphony Orchestra in cooperation with Concerts Norway. The concerto had its premiere on 30 September 2010.

== Publications ==
- Bjørklund, Terje (2000) Moderne jazz-improvisasjon. 2nd ed. Oslo, Norsk musikforlag. ISBN 82-7093-436-4
- Music and scores are published by the following: Pizzicato (Italy/Switzerland); Warner/Chappell; Norwegian Music Publishers (Norsk Musikkforlag); Music House Publishers (Musikkhusets forlag); Music Information Center in Oslo (MIC).

== Recordings ==
Bjørklund's music has been released on three dedicated CDs:

- “Music for Strings” (Hemera HCD 2923)
- “Sacred Music” (MIT CD 0197)
- “Silent Tracks” (Arctos CD 0104)

In addition, many of his works are included on other CDs. A complete list is found on his own website.

Awards
| Preceded by Radka Toneff | Recipient of the Buddyprisen; 1983 | Succeeded by Jon Balke |
