= Johannes Eick =

Norwegian bassist (born 1964)

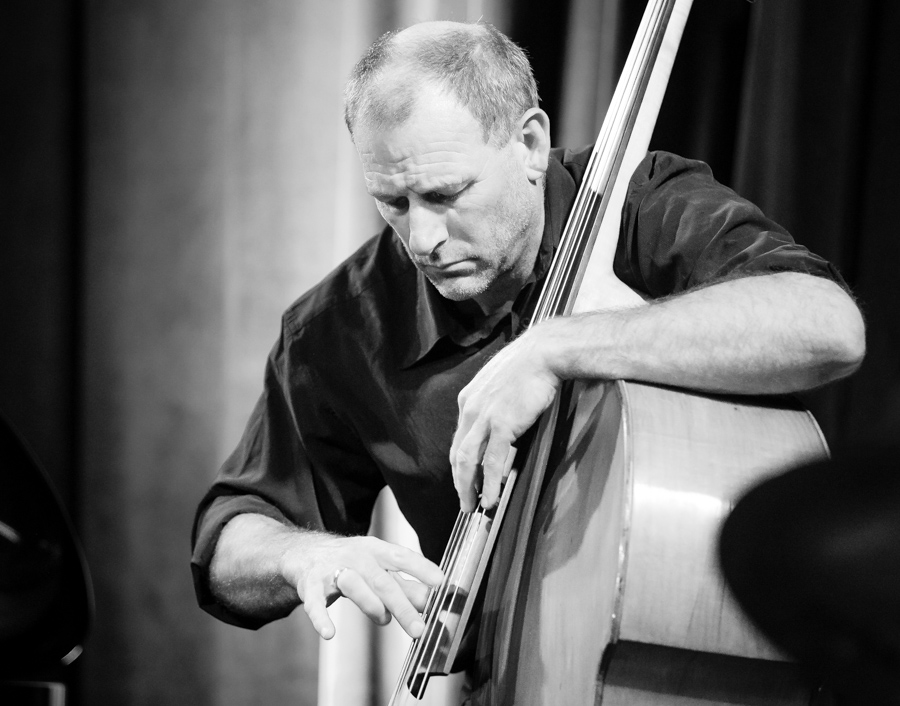
- Eick performing in 2019

Background information
- Born: 22 April 1964 (age 62); Eidsfoss, Vestfold
- Origin: Norway
- Genres: Jazz
- Occupations: Musician, composer
- Instrument: Upright bass
- Website: www.vestfoldnett.com/art/eick

Johannes Eick (born 22 April 1964) is a Norwegian bassist (double bass and electric bass guitar), the son of bassist and vibraphonist Jürgen Eick (b. 1937), and the older brother of musicians Trude Eick and Mathias Eick. In his youth he played in the band «Kix», with Elin Rosseland (1982–86), but is most known for cooperations with Karin Krog, John Surman, Vigleik Storaas, Christian Wallumrød, Sidsel Endresen and Hans Mathisen.

== Career ==
Eick was born in Eidsfoss, Vestfold. He studied on the jazz program at Trondheim Musikkonservatorium (1983–86). He was involved in several bands from the first year in Trondheim, including «Horn» and «Third Floor Ten Piece Band» 1983-84, «Visit» 1984-85, «Fair Play» 1987-90, «Nimbus» 1987-89, «Pentateuch» and «Nuku» from 1989 (with the album «Nuku» in 1991), «Airamero» fra 1990 (with an album in 1993), and «Vigleik Storaas Trio» from 1992 (with the albums «Bilder» 1994, «Andre bilder» 1996 and «Subsonic», released in 2002).

In 1983 he converted the double bass from 4 to 5 strings, and constructed at the same time a 5-string electric bass guitar. In 1991 he extended both to 6 strings. He festival debuted in Molde in 1985 with «Elin Rosseland Quintet», and released his first album with her in 1988 («Fair Play»). In 1985-87 he was a regional musician in Finnmark with the Quartet «NOOR», and in recent years he has had his base in Eastern Norway, and has cooperated with Michael Bloch (1991–92), Karin Krog & John Surman, and the quartet «Kalpa» (1992–94) among others.

== Honors ==
- Spellemannprisen 1995 in the class Jazz for the album «Bilder (1994), with the «Vigleik Storaas Trio»

== Discography (selection) ==
With Elin Rosseland

- Fair Play (Odin, 1989)
- Fair Play (2) (Grappa, 1993), feat. Norma Winstone (vocals)
- Fra himmelen er det langt ned (NorCD, 1997), as trio «The (3)» with Christian Wallumrød
- Moment (NorCD, 2004), as trio with Rob Waring

With «Nuku» (Bjørn Klakegg, Celio de Carvalho & Trond Kopperud)

- Det Absolutte Nullpunkt (Curling Legs, 1992)

With «Airamero» (Christian Wallumrød, Per Oddvar Johansen & Trygve Seim)

- Airamero (Odin, 1993)

With «Vigleik Storaas Trio»

- Bilder (Curling Legs, 1995)
- Andre bilder (Curling Legs, 1997)
- Subsonic (Curling Legs, 2002)

With Hans Mathisen

- Quiet songs (2002)
