= Club 7 =

Cultural club in Oslo, Norway

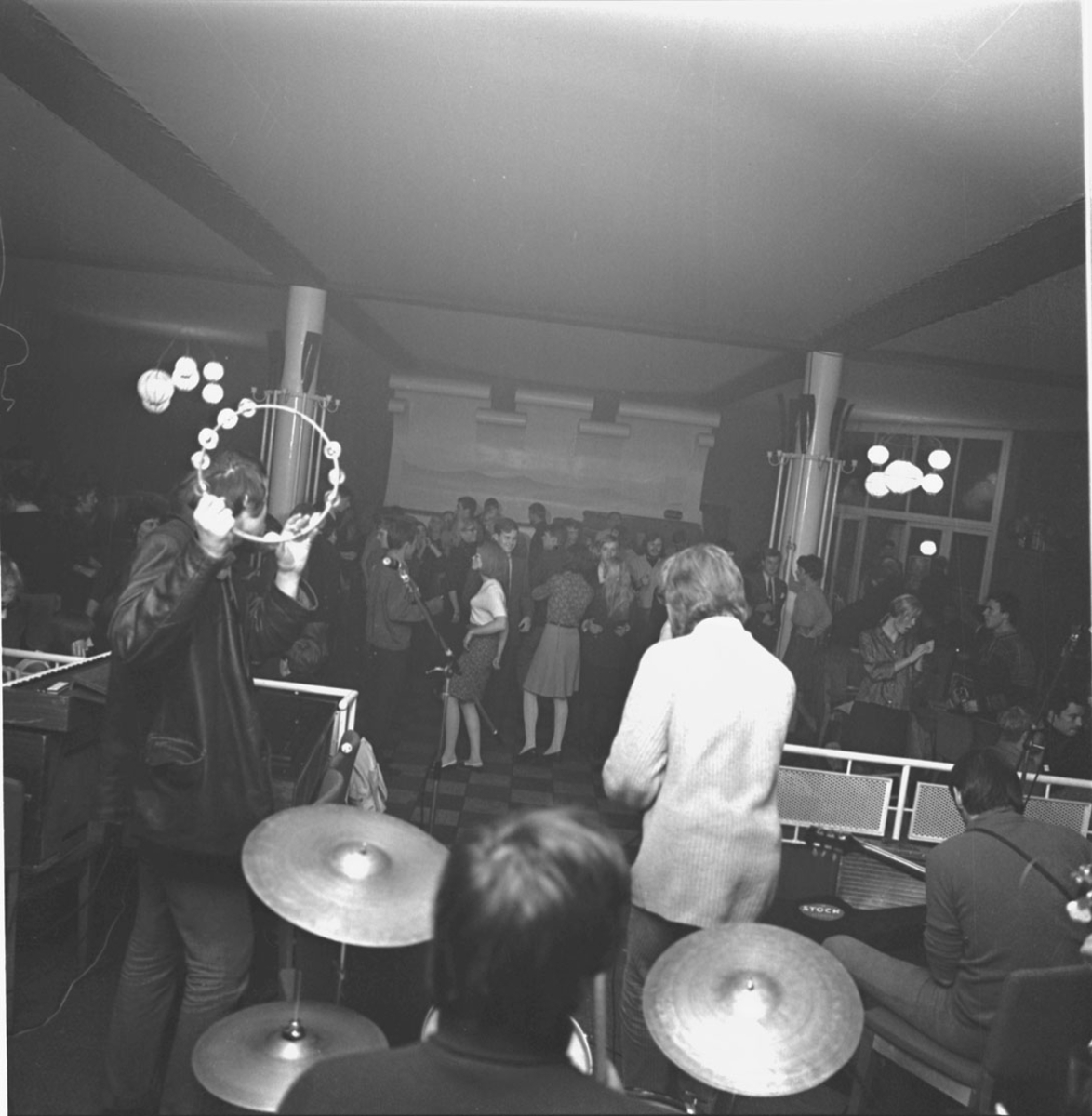
Public Enemies performing at Club 7 in 1966.

Club 7 was a cultural club in Oslo, Norway, active from 1963 to 1985. It was regarded a centre for counterculture in Norway in the 1960s through the 1970s. There was a wide tolerance for alternative lifestyles, including homosexuality.

== History ==
Club 7 was established in 1963 by Attila Horvath and Odd Schou. The first meeting took place at Kafé René at Lilletorget, Oslo. Among the pioneers was also poet Kate Næss, who is credited for inventing the name of the club. The name "Club 7" is supposed to mean the club should be "more than sex" (the number 6 in Norwegian is pronounced like "sex"). The avant-garde theatre Stage 7 (Norwegian: Scene 7) was started in 1966, with Sossen Krohg as artistical director. Other club activities were jazz concerts, poetry evenings, rock concerts, exhibitions, café and activities for children. The club had various locations over years, including Drammensveien 64, the Edderkoppen Theatre, the restaurant Kongen near Frognerkilen, and the Oslo Concert Hall. In the 1970s the club was located in Vika, in block D of Oslo Concert Hall, where it covered an area of 1,400 square meters, and had an average number of 300 visitors per evening. The club had its own library, gallery and newspaper. It hosted blues concerts, folk concerts and jazz concerts, movie shows and dance evenings. The theatre staged experimental plays by playwrights such as Ionesco, Fo and Cocteau. Among the theatre's greatest successes was a dance performance based on Gerd Brantenberg's novel Egalias døtre. Jens Bjørneboe's play Tilfellet Torgersen (The Torgersen Case) premiered at Stage 7 on 25 January 1973. The theatre also showed a series of children's plays written by Sossen Krohg, starting with Skinka Nøff og Grynta som ikke ville bli julebord in 1975.

The club closed in 1985 after bankruptcy.
