= Jan Erik Kongshaug =

Norwegian sound engineer (1944–2019)

- Born: 4 July 1944; Trondheim, Norway
- Died: 5 November 2019 (aged 75)
- Genre: Jazz
- Occupations: Sound engineering, producer, musician, composer, Band leader
- Instrument: Guitar
- Formerly of: Rainbow Studio
- Website: rainbowstudio.no

Jan Erik Kongshaug (4 July 1944 – 5 November 2019) was a Norwegian sound engineer, jazz guitarist, and composer.

== Career ==
Kongshaug was born in Trondheim, the son of guitarist John Kongshaug. During his childhood and adolescence, he began to play the accordion (1950), guitar (1958) and bass (1964). Kongshaug gained his examen artium in 1963, and trained in electronics at the Trondheim Technical School in 1967. Then he worked for the Arne Bendiksen Studio (1967–1974) and Talent Studio (1974–79) in Oslo, and undertook some jobs in New York. In 1984, he founded his own recording studio, Rainbow Studio in Oslo and evolved into being one of the grand masters of Sound engineering. Altogether, he produced over 4,000 records, and was particularly known for some 700 recordings for ECM Records made from 1970 onwards.

Kongshaug played with Åse Kleveland winning the Norsk Melodi Grand Prix in 1966, and was third in the Eurovision Song Contest (1966). He has also played on dozens of recordings, including with Asmund Bjørken, Frode Thingnæs, Sven Nyhus, Arild Andersen and Frode Alnæs.

Kongshaug died in Oslo from a chronic lung condition, aged 75. His critical role in the development of the "ECM Sound" was acknowledged in numerous obituaries.

== Honors ==
- Spellemannprisen 1982, Special Award Diploma
- Gammleng-prisen 2012, Studio Award

== Discography ==
- The Other World (ACT, 1999)
- All These Years (Ponca Jazz, 2003)

Preceded by Terje Rypdal	Recipient of the Spellemannprisen Special award 1982	Succeeded by No Special award
Preceded by Yngve Sætre & Frank Brodahl	Recipient of the Gammleng-prisen Studio award 2012	Succeeded by -
