= Chet Baker discography =

This article contains the discography of the American jazz trumpeter and singer Chet Baker. His most productive period was arguably for Pacific Records during the 1950s, which included his first vocal recordings.

== Discography ==
=== Pacific Jazz/World Pacific ===
- 1953: This Time the Dream's on Me: Chet Baker Quartet Live, Vol. 1 (2000)
- 1953: The Chet Baker Quartet (1953) with Russ Freeman
- 1953: Chet Baker Quartet featuring Russ Freeman (1953)
- 1953: Chet Baker Ensemble (1953)
- 1953-54: West Coast Live (1997) with Stan Getz
- 1954: Out of Nowhere: Chet Baker Quartet Live, Vol. 2 (2001)
- 1954: My Old Flame: Chet Baker Quartet Live, Vol. 3 (2001)
- 1954: Chet Baker Sings (1954)
- 1954: Chet Baker Sextet (1954)
- 1953-54: The Trumpet Artistry of Chet Baker (1955)
- 1954: Jazz at Ann Arbor (1954)
- 1953-55: Grey December (1992)
- 1955: Chet Baker Sings and Plays (1955) with Bud Shank, Russ Freeman And Strings
- 1955: Chet Baker in Europe (1955) - this album is sub-titled A Jazz Tour of the NATO Countries
- 1956: Chet Baker & Crew (1957)
- 1956: The Route (1989) with Art Pepper
- 1956: Chet Baker Big Band (1956)
- 1956: Playboys (1956) with Art Pepper – also released as Picture of Heath
- 1956: Quartet: Russ Freeman/Chet Baker (1957)
- 1953-57: Pretty/Groovy (World Pacific, 1958)
- 1957: Embraceable You (1995)
- 1965: A Taste of Tequila (World Pacific, 1966) with The Mariachi Brass
- 1966: Hats Off (World Pacific, 1966) with The Mariachi Brass
- 1966: Quietly There (World Pacific, 1966) with the Carmel Strings
- 1966: Double-Shot (World Pacific, 1966) with The Mariachi Brass
- 1966: Into My Life (World Pacific, 1966) with the Carmel Strings
- 1966: In The Mood (World Pacific, 1966) with The Mariachi Brass

=== Barclay/EmArcy ===
- Chet Baker Quartet (1955) – also known as Rondette
- Chet Baker Quartet (1955) – also known as Summertime
- Chet Baker and His Quintet with Bobby Jaspar (1956) – also known as Alone Together
- Chet in Paris, Vol. 1: Featuring Dick Twardzik (EmArcy, 1988) – recorded in 1955
- Chet in Paris, Vol. 2: Everything Happens to Me (EmArcy, 1988) – recorded in 1955
- Chet in Paris, Vol. 3: Cheryl (EmArcy, 1988) – recorded in 1955–56
- Chet in Paris, Vol. 4: Alternate Takes (EmArcy, 1988) – recorded in 1955–56. this series has been sub-titled...The Complete Barclay Recordings of Chet Baker.

=== Riverside/Jazzland ===
- (Chet Baker Sings) It Could Happen to You (1958)
- Chet Baker in New York (1958) – also released as Polka Dots and Moonbeams
- Chet Baker Introduces Johnny Pace with Johnny Pace (1958)
- Chet (1959) – this album is sub-titled The Lyrical Trumpet of Chet Baker
- Chet Baker Plays the Best of Lerner and Loewe (1959)
- Chet Baker in Milan (Jazzland, 1959)
- Chet Baker with Fifty Italian Strings (Jazzland, 1959) – also released as Angel Eyes

=== Prestige ===
- Smokin' with the Chet Baker Quintet (1965)
- Groovin' with the Chet Baker Quintet (1965)
- Comin' On with the Chet Baker Quintet (1965)
- Cool Burnin' with the Chet Baker Quintet (1965)
- Boppin' with the Chet Baker Quintet (1965)

=== SteepleChase ===
- The Touch of Your Lips (1979) - with Doug Raney, Niels-Henning Ørsted Pedersen
- No Problem (1979) - with Duke Jordan
- Daybreak (1979) - with Doug Raney, Niels-Henning Ørsted Pedersen
- This Is Always (1979 [1982]) - with Doug Raney, Niels-Henning Ørsted Pedersen
- Someday My Prince Will Come (1979 [1983]) - with Doug Raney, Niels-Henning Ørsted Pedersen
- Diane (1985) - with Paul Bley
- When Sunny Gets Blue (1986)

=== Enja ===
- Oh You Crazy Moon (1978 [2003])
- Peace (1982)
- Strollin' (1986) - with Philip Catherine, Jean-Louis Rassinfosse
- My Favourite Songs: The Last Great Concert (1988)
- Straight from the Heart: The Great Last Concert, Vol. 2 (1990)
- The Last Great Concert: My Favourite Songs, Vols. 1 & 2 (1988)

=== Circle ===
- Live in Paris (1980)
- Night Bird (1980)
- Tune Up (1980 [1981])
- My Funny Valentine (1980 [1981])
- Round Midnight (1980 [1982])
- In Your Own Sweet Way (1980 [1983])
- Just Friends: Chet Baker Live in the Subway Club (1980 [1984])
- I Remember You (1980 [1984])
- Conception (1980 [1985]) - with Karl Ratzer
- Down: Chet Baker Live in the Subway Club (1980 [1988])
- It Never Entered My Mind (1980 [1990])

=== Timeless ===
- Everything Happens To Me (1983) - with Kirk Lightsey Trio
- Mr. B (1983)
- Chet Baker Sings Again (1985)
- There'll Never Be Another You (1985 [1997]) - with Philip Catherine
- As Time Goes By (1986) - note: this album is sub-titled Love Songs
- Cool Cat (1986 [1989]) - note: this album is sub-titled Chet Baker Plays, Chet Baker Sings
- Farewell (1988)
- Live in Rosenheim (1988)
- Heartbreak: Chet Baker With Strings (1991)

=== Fresh Sound ===
- Inglewood Jam: Bird & Chet Live at the Trade Winds (1952) - with Charlie Parker
- Chet Baker Live at the Trade Winds (1952) - with Sonny Criss, Wardell Gray, Jack Montrose, Al Haig
- L.A. Get-Together! (1952–1953) - with Stan Getz
- At the Forum Theater (1956) - with Phil Urso, Bobby Timmons
- Burnin' at Backstreet (1980)
- Live at Fat Tuesday's (1981) - with Bud Shank

=== Philology ===
- Haig '53: The Other Piano Less Quartet (1953 [1996]) - with Stan Getz
- In Europe, 1955 (1955 [1991])
- A Trumpet for the Sky: Club 21, Paris - Vols. 1 & 2 (1983 [1993])
- Live from the Moonlight (1985 [1988])
- A Night at the Shalimar Club (1987 [1991])
- Little Girl Blue (1988) - with the Space Jazz Trio

=== Other labels ===
- Chet Baker & Strings (Columbia, 1954)
- Chet Baker Quintet Cools Out (Crown, 1963)
- Chet Is Back! (RCA, 1962)
- The Most Important Jazz Album of 1964/65 (Colpix, 1964)
- Baby Breeze (Limelight, 1965)
- Baker's Holiday (Limelight, 1965)
- Albert's House (Beverly Hills, 1969)
- Blood, Chet and Tears (Verve, 1970)
- She Was Too Good to Me (CTI, 1974)
- The Incredible Chet Baker Plays and Sings (Carosello Records, 1977)
- You Can't Go Home Again (A&M/Horizon, 1977)
- Ballads for Two with Wolfgang Lackerschmid (Sandra Music, 1979)
- Rendez-Vous (Bingow, 1979)
- Two A Day (All Life, 1979)
- Once Upon a Summertime (Artists House, 1980)
- Leaving (Intercord, 1980)
- Broken Wing (Inner City, 1981) - originally released on the Sonopresse label in 1979
- In Concert (India Navigation, 1982)
- The Improviser (Cadence Jazz, 1984)
- At Capolinea (Red, 1984)
- Blues for a Reason (Criss Cross, 1984)
- Chet's Choice (Criss Cross, 1985)
- Hazy Hugs (Limetree, 1985)
- Witch Doctor (Contemporary, 1985) - recorded 1953
- Chet Baker Plays Vladimir Cosma (Carrere, 1985)
- Candy (Sonet, 1985)
- Rique Pantoja & Chet Baker (Warner Music Brasil, 1987, WEA Latina, 1989)
- Live at Nick's (Criss Cross, 1987)
- Memories: Chet Baker in Tokyo (Paddle Wheel, 1988)
- Four: Chet Baker in Tokyo (Paddle Wheel, 1989)
- Stella by Starlight (West Wind, 1989)
- The Best Thing for You (A&M, 1989)
- Chet Baker Sings and Plays from the Film "Let's Get Lost" (Novus/RCA, 1989)
- Nightbird (live at Ronnie Scott's London) aka Love For Sale (Castle Communications/Jazz Door, 1990)
- Out of Nowhere (Milestone, 1991)
- Chet Baker and the Boto Brazilian Quartet (Dreyfus, 1991)
- Chet Baker in Bologna (Dreyfus, 1992)
- Live at Pueblo, Colorado 1966 (CCB, 1992)
- Somewhere Over The Rainbow (RCA, 1992) which contains six tunes in Chet Is Back! (1962)
- Chet Baker in Tokyo, Live with Harold Danko, Hein Van Der Geyn, John Engels (Evidence, 1996)
- Sings, Plays: Live at the Keystone Korner (HighNote, 2003)
- Live in London (Ubuntu, 2016)
- Live in London Volume II (Ubuntu, 2018)
- Round Midnight 79 (Wnts, 2018)
- Live In Paris: The Radio France Recordings 1983-1984 (Elemental Music, 2022)
- In Perfect Harmony: The Lost Album (Jazz Detective, 2024)
- Blue Room - The 1979 VARA Studio Sessions In Holland, 1979 (Jazz Detective, 2023)
- Live in Japan 1986 Sendai Vol.1 (Timeless Records, 2025)
- Live in Japan 1986 Sendai Vol.2 (Timeless Records, 2025)
- Chet Baker Performs & Sings Swimming By Moonlight (Slow Down Sounds, 2025)
- At George Jazzcafé, 1983, Arnhem, The Netherlands (Timeless, 2026)

=== As sideman ===
With Stan Getz

- Stan Meets Chet (Verve, 1958)
- Line for Lyons (Sonet, 1983)
- West Coast Live (Pacific, 1997)

With Jim Hall

- Concierto (CTI, 1975)
- Studio Trieste (CTI, 1982) also with Hubert Laws

With Gerry Mulligan

- Gerry Mulligan Quartet Volume 1 (Pacific Jazz, 1952)
- The Gerry Mulligan Quartet (Fantasy, 1953)
- Lee Konitz Plays with the Gerry Mulligan Quartet (Pacific Jazz, 1953)
- Gerry Mulligan Quartet Volume 2 (Pacific Jazz, 1953)
- Gene Norman Presents 'The Gerry Mulligan Quartet' (GNP, 1954)
- Reunion with Chet Baker (World Pacific, 1958)
- Annie Ross Sings a Song with Mulligan! (World Pacific, 1959)
- Carnegie Hall Concert (CTI, 1974)

With Art Pepper

- The Artistry of Pepper (Pacific Jazz, 1962)
- Art Pepper Plays Shorty Rogers & Others (Pacific Jazz, 1978)

With Bud Shank

- Michelle (World Pacific, 1966)
- California Dreamin' (World Pacific, 1966)
- Brazil! Brazil! Brazil! (World Pacific, 1966)
- Magical Mystery (World Pacific, 1968)

With others

- Harry Babasin, On the Coast (Jazz Showcase, 1978)
- Ron Carter, Patrão (Milestone, 1981)
- Philip Catherine, Jean-Louis Rassinfosse, Crystal Bells (LDH, 1983)
- Elvis Costello, Punch the Clock (Columbia, 1983)
- Miles Davis, At Last (Contemporary, 1985)
- Paul Desmond, Together: The Complete Studio Recordings (Epic, 1992)
- Lizzy Mercier Descloux, One for the Soul (Polydor, 1986)
- Astrud Gilberto, That Girl from Ipanema (Image, 1977)
- Jean-Jacques Goldman, Non homologué (Epic, 1985)
- Rachel Gould, All Blues (Bingow 1979)
- Michel Graillier, Dream Drops (Owl, 1982)
- Lars Gullin, The Great Lars Gullin Vol. 1 '55/'56 (Dragon, 1982)
- Charlie Haden, Silence (Soul Note, 1989) – recorded in 1987
- Herbie Hancock, Round Midnight (Columbia, 1986)
- Roland Hanna, Gershwin Carmichael Cats (CTI, 1982)
- Wolfgang Lackerschmid, Chet Baker / Wolfgang Lackerschmid (Sandra Music Productions, 1979)
- Wolfgang Lackerschmidt, Wolfgang Lackerschmidt & Chet Baker, Welcome Back (West Wind, 1992)
- Kirk Lightsey, Everything Happens to Me (Timeless, 1983)
- Joe Pass, A Sign of the Times (World Pacific, 1966)
- Jack Sheldon, Jack's Groove (GNP, 1961)
- Archie Shepp, In Memory Of (L+R, 1988)
- Dick Twardzik, The Last Set (Pacific Jazz, 1962)
- Jan Erik Vold, Blåmann! Blåmann! (Hot Club, 1988)
