= The Touch of Your Lips (disambiguation) =

"The Touch of Your Lips" is a song written by Ray Noble in 1936.

The song gave its title to the following albums:

- The Touch of Your Lips (Chet Baker album), 1979
- The Touch of Your Lips (Pat Boone album), 1964
- The Touch of Your Lips (Nat King Cole album), 1961
