= Oh You Crazy Moon (album) =

Live album by Chet Baker
- Released: 2003
- Recorded: December 9, 1978
- Venue: Stuttgart, West Germany
- Genre: Jazz
- Length: 64:10
- Label: Enja; ENJ-9453

Chet Baker chronology
Live at Nick's (1978)	Oh You Crazy Moon (2003)	Broken Wing (1978)

Oh You Crazy Moon (subtitled The Legacy: Vol. 4) is a live album by trumpeter Chet Baker which was recorded in 1978 but not released on the German Enja label until 2003.

== Reception ==
Professional ratings
Review scores
Source	Rating
Allmusic	3/5 stars
The Penguin Guide to Jazz Recordings	3/4 stars

The Allmusic review by Rick Anderson states "certainly worth hearing, if not quite essential. Baker's accompanists provide most of the truly transcendent musical moments ... Overall, this is an album his established fans will enjoy, but those looking for a good entry into his voluminous catalog will do best to start with the 1950s recordings that made him a star".

== Track listing ==
1. "The Touch of Your Lips" (Ray Noble) – 10:58
2. "Beautiful Black Eyes" (Wayne Shorter) – 14:30
3. "Oh, You Crazy Moon" (Jimmy Van Heusen, Johnny Burke) – 9:15
4. "Love for Sale" (Cole Porter) – 11:33
5. "Once Upon a Summertime" (Eddie Barclay, Michel Legrand, Eddy Marnay, Johnny Mercer) – 8:56
6. "My Funny Valentine" (Richard Rodgers, Lorenz Hart) – 8:58

== Personnel ==
- Chet Baker – trumpet, vocals
- Phil Markowitz – piano
- Scott Lee – bass
- Jeff Brillinger – drums
