= 91.0 FM =

FM radio frequency

The following radio stations broadcast on FM frequency 91.0 MHz:

== Germany ==
- hr1 in Middle Hesse

== Israel ==
- Radio Lev HaMedina in the Central District

== New Zealand ==
- ZM Auckland in Auckland

== Ukraine ==
- Kraina FM in Odesa
