= All Blues (disambiguation) =

"All Blues" is a jazz composition by Miles Davis.

All Blues may also refer to:

- All Blues (Clarke-Boland Big Band album), 1971
- All Blues (Ray Bryant album), 1978
- All Blues (Ron Carter album), 1974
- All Blues (Rachel Gould and Chet Baker album), 1979
- All Blues (GRP All-Star Big Band album), 1995
