= Live at Nick's =

Live album by Chet Baker Quartet featuring Phil Markowitz
- Released: 1987
- Recorded: November 30, 1978
- Venue: Nick Vollebregt's Jazzcafé, Laren, Netherlands
- Genre: Jazz
- Length: 69:05 CD release with bonus track
- Label: Criss Cross Jazz; 1027
- Producer: Gerry Teekens

Chet Baker chronology
| Live in Chateauvallon, 1978 (1978) | Live at Nick's (1987) | Oh You Crazy Moon (1978) |

Live at Nick's is a live album by trumpeter Chet Baker which was recorded in 1978 but not released on the Dutch Criss Cross Jazz label until 1987.

== Reception ==
Professional ratings
Review scores
| Source | Rating |
|---|---|
| Allmusic | 4/5 stars |

The Allmusic review by Scott Yanow states "Considering his erratic lifestyle, it is surprising how many good records Chet Baker made during his final 15 years. ... The quiet but swinging music is quite enjoyable and finds Baker in fine form".

== Track listing ==
1. "The Best Thing for You Is Me" (Irving Berlin) – 9:44
2. "Broken Wing" (Richie Beirach) – 9:56
3. "This Is Always" (Harry Warren, Mack Gordon) – 8:27
4. "Beautiful Black Eyes" (Wayne Shorter) – 17:11
5. "I Remember You" (Victor Schertzinger, Johnny Mercer) – 10:10 Bonus track on CD release
6. "Love for Sale" (Cole Porter) – 13:37 Bonus track on CD release

== Personnel ==
- Chet Baker – trumpet, vocals
- Phil Markowitz – piano
- Scott Lee – bass
- Jeff Brillinger – drums
