= Sonny Russo =

American jazz musician

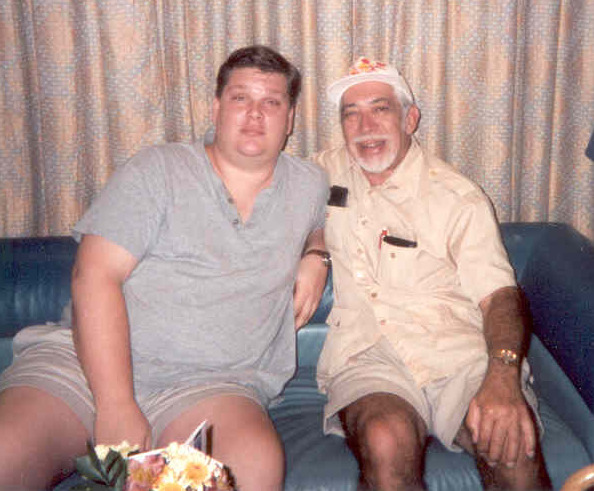
Jeff Albert and Sonny Russo

Santo J. "Sonny" Russo (March 20, 1929 – February 23, 2013) was an American jazz trombonist.

Russo grew up in a musical family; both his father and grandfather were professional horn players. He first played piano and violin, and played with his father's group at age 15. He had a long list of associations with noted jazz musicians; he started out with Buddy Morrow in 1947, and then played with Lee Castle (1948), Sam Donahue (1949), Artie Shaw (1949–50), Art Mooney (1950), Tito Puente, Jerry Wald, Tommy Tucker, Buddy Rich, Ralph Flanagan (1951–52), the Sauter-Finegan Orchestra (1953–55), Neal Hefti (1954–55), John LaPorta (1954–1957) where Russo played Trombone Jimmy Dorsey and Tommy Dorsey (1955–56), and Maynard Ferguson (1956). Starting in the mid-1950s Russo found work in the bands of various Broadway shows. In the late 1950s and 1960s he worked with Louie Bellson (1957), Celia Cruz-Tito Puente (1966), Machito, Bobby Hackett, Benny Goodman, and Doc Severinsen (1967). From 1969 to 1972 he was a member of The Tonight Show orchestra, and he worked with Frank Sinatra from 1967 to 1988. He also played on Urbie Green's 21 Trombones and solos on many others including Maynard Ferguson, Sauter Finnegan, Artie Shaw, Neil Hefti, and the World's Greatest Jazz Band in the 1970s. While touring with The World's Greatest Jazz Band Russo was invited to the White House to play for President Gerald Ford and First Lady Betty Ford.

He played again on an RCA Victor 1970-1979 various artists set.

Russo recorded extensively with singers; in addition to Frank Sinatra he played behind Jimmy Rushing, Tony Bennett, Lena Horne, Perry Como, Dinah Washington, Liza Minnelli, Elvis Presley, Paul Anka, Ray Charles, Steve Lawrence, and Eydie Gorme. Sonny also performs on the soundtracks to the films The Godfather, The Godfather II, Goodfellas, and Sophie's Choice. In 1971 during a performance on The Tonight Show Starring Johnny Carson with Louis Armstrong as one of the guests, Russo shared the stage with Louis in which he played the solo on the tune "Someday You'll Be Sorry". Sonny was a fixture in the recording studios for radio and television. while Jerry Lewis was doing the Muscular Dystrophy Telethon in New York City, Russo was a regular in the Orchestra always in demand he later worked with Lewis while Lewis performed his one-man show in Upstate New York. While touring around the world with Frank Sinatra during their performance and filming of Concert of the Americas, Sonny played the trombone solo on the tune "I've Got You Under My Skin" and Cocorvado and was announced by Sinatra during the performance. He has also done many Jazz gigs with the likes of Al Cohn, Zoot Simms, Mousey Alexander, and Milt Hinton. Sonny was a graduate from the Manhattan School of Music, where he earned his master's degree.

== Discography ==
=== As sideman ===
- Dorothy Ashby, The Fantastic Jazz Harp of Dorothy Ashby (Atlantic, 1965)
- Machito, Kenya (Roulette, 1958)
- Louie Bellson, Let's Call It Swing (Verve, 1957)
- Paul Butterfield, Put It in Your Ear (Bearsville, 1975)
- Dick Collins, King Richard the Swing Hearted (RCA Victor, 1955)
- Irving Cottler, I've Got You Under My Skins (Project 3, 1982)
- Larry Elgart, Flight of the Condor (RCA Victor, 1981)
- Maynard Ferguson, The Birdland Dreamband (Bluebird, 1987)
- Urbie Green, 21 Trombones (Project 3, 1973)
- Urbie Green, Urbie Green's Big Beautiful Band (Project 3, 1974)
- Quincy Jones, Quincy Plays for Pussycats (Mercury, 1965)
- Bob Keeshan, A Child's Introduction to Jazz (Golden, 1958)
- John LaPorta, Conceptions (Fantasy, 1956)
- Yank Lawson & Bob Haggart, Plays Duke Ellington (World Jazz, 1976)
- Yank Lawson & Bob Haggart, On Tour Vol 1 and 2 (World Jazz, 1977)
- Machito, Latin Soul Plus Jazz (Tico, 1973)
- Meco, Encounters of Every Kind (Millennium, 1977)
- Meco, Music Inspired by Star Wars and Other Galactic Funk (Millennium, 1977)
- Meco, The Wizard of Oz (RCA Victor, 1978)
- Meco, Superman and Other Galactic Heroes (Casablanca, 1979)
- Glenn Miller, In the Digital Mood (GRP, 1983)
- Tony Mottola, Tony Mottola and the Brass Menagerie (Project 3, 1974)
- Don Redman, The Don Redman All-Stars Vol 2 (Sesac, 1960)
- David Ruffin, Who I Am (Motown, 1975)
- Sauter-Finegan Orchestra, Inside Sauter-Finegan (RCA Victor, 1954)
- Sauter-Finegan Orchestra, Straight Down the Middle (RCA Victor, 1958)
- Don Sebesky, The Rape of El Morro (CTI, 1975)
- Artie Shaw, 1949 Previously Unreleased (MusicMasters, 1990)
- Jean Shepherd, Into the Unknown with Jazz Music (Abbott, 1956)
- Rex Stewart and Cootie Williams, Porgy & Bess Revisited (Warner Bros., 1959)
- Sonny Truitt, Drummer Delights (Music Minus One, 1961)
- Jerry Wald, Pennies from Heaven/Raisins and Almonds (Decca, 1955)
- Dinah Washington, Dinah Washington Sings Fats Waller (Mercury, 1959)
