= Soft Winds =

1940 jazz standard

"Soft Winds" is a 1940 jazz standard composed by Benny Goodman, with lyrics by Roy Alfred. Charlie Parker performed it regularly in the 1940s. In 1961, jazz harpist Dorothy Ashby released an album of the same name with the song as the title track, recorded at the Plaza Sound Studios in New York City. Canadian jazz pianist Oscar Peterson regularly performed the song in the 1970s and 1980s with the Oscar Peterson Quartet. Chet Baker, Dinah Washington and numerous others recorded it. The theme song to the British dating show Blind Date closely resembles the standard but Goodman is not credited.

== Covers ==
- Herb Ellis - Nothing But the Blues (1958)
- Dorothy Ashby - Soft Winds (1961)
