= Into My Life =

Into My Life may refer to:

- Into My Life (album), a 1966 album by Chet Baker and the Carmel Strings
- "Into My Life", a Men at Work song from the album Brazil
- "Into My Life", a Deborah Allen song from the 1993 album Delta Dreamland
- "Into My Life", an episode of the TV series Summerland
