= Anne Hall Levine =

American radio broadcaster (born 1960)

Anne Levine
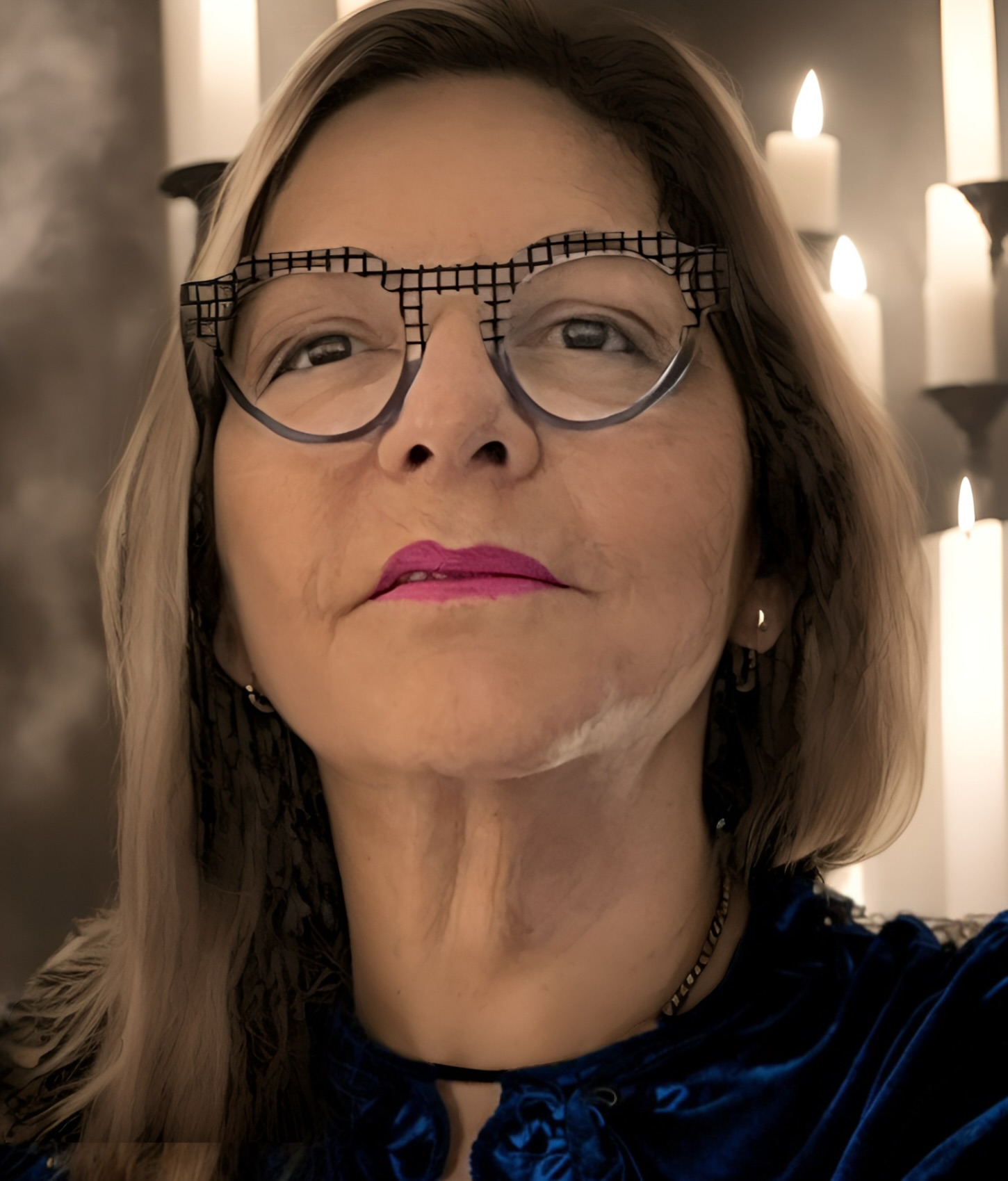
- Anne Levine in 2025
- Born: July 19, 1960; New York City, U.S.
- Died: April 28, 2026 (aged 65)
- Education: Choate Rosemary Hall; Sarah Lawrence College (1982)
- Father: Larry Levine

Anne Hall Levine (July 19, 1959 - April 28, 2026) was an American radio broadcaster.

== Early life and education ==
Levine was born in New York City to parents Emily and Larry Levine. She was raised in Sands Point, Long Island, where she attended Buckley Country Day School, followed by boarding school at Choate Rosemary Hall. She continued her education at Sarah Lawrence College, studying theatre and literature, and graduated in 1982. Levine received a degree in Hebrew Language fluency from Municipality Eliat.

== Career ==
In 1989, after working for her father in the Garment District, she started her own coat line at MDP Designs, Ltd., a manufacturer of women's coats.

She began her radio career in 1999 as an on-air talent with a terrestrial radio satirical call-in show, What's Your Diagnosis?, which she continued until 2004, when she moved to her family home on Cape Cod. She also worked as a cabaret singer.

In 2008, she launched The Anne Levine Show for a weekly broadcast on WOMR-FM. The show, available to stream, features her husband Michael Hill-Levine, and the two delve into pop culture, comic takes on assorted issues, and send-ups of people and places in their lives.

=== Journalism during the Russo-Ukrainian war ===
In March 2022, shortly after Russia invaded Ukraine, Anne read an article in The New Yorker about Kraina FM, one of the largest Ukrainian radio networks. The story told of how the station manager, Bogdan Bolkhovetsky, and program director, Roman Davydov, were managing to keep the network on the air throughout Ukraine while hiding in the Carpathian Mountains after their broadcast tower in Kyiv was bombed by the Russians, thus turning the radio station into a force of national resistance. After reading the article, Anne became determined to locate Bolkhovetsky and Davydov in order to help their cause.

She located Bolkhovetsky, who agreed to give her an interview. When a broadcast of the interview caught the interest of station managers at the Pacifica Radio Network, Anne was featured in a Pacifica Network article and was offered a show presenting interviews each week with people coping with the Russian invasion. The show, Ukraine 242 (edited by Pacifica's Ursula Rudenberg and recorded by Michael Hill-Levine), has been met with some acclaim, including two centerpiece stories in The Cape Cod Times, the inclusion of two Ukraine 242 interviews on the Pacifica Network show, Sprouts, as well as a feature in Patch. Among Anne's interview subjects on Ukraine 242 are Oleksandra Matviichuk, who won the Nobel Peace Prize in 2022, Iuliia Mendel, former press secretary to President Zelensky, Serhii Plokhy, director of the Harvard Ukrainian Research Institute, and a wide array of authors, physicians, heads of NGOs, experts in warcraft, and authors.

== Personal life ==
In 2003, Levine was diagnosed with Lymphangioleiomyomatosis (LAM), a progressive terminal lung disease.

Levine met Michael Hill in 2009, and the two moved in together in Cape Cod that year. The couple married in 2015. They were featured in 2015 on NPR's All Things Considered and were written up in The New York Times. They were also included in 2015 as one of ten couples The New York Times featured in a recap of the year's "how they met" stories. She had been previously married and divorced.

Levine died on April 28, 2026 from LAM.

== Publications ==
- The Main Street Rag, Volume 26, Number 1, Winter 2021, “Holiday”
- Poetica Magazine: Contemporary Jewish Writing, Fall 2021, “My Rose of Sharon”
- I-70 Review: Writing and Art from the Middle and Beyond, Summer/Fall 2021, “The Arab Boy” and “Near Belzen”
- Nixes Mate Review, September 2020, “Queen Mary’s Collection” and “Your Office After the 11th”
- Muddy River Poetry Review, Fall 2020, “The Last Day”
- Voices Israel Anthology 2020: Poetry from Israel and Abroad, Volume 46, “Entrada Elena” and “Wedding Reception”
- Tikkun, August 24, 2020, “Death and Amtrak”
