= Django/Misty =

Studio album by Dorothy Ashby
- Released: 1984
- Genre: Jazz
- Length: 34:03
- Label: Philips Records 818 280-2

Dorothy Ashby chronology
The Rubaiyat of Dorothy Ashby (1970)	Django/Misty (1984)	Concierto de Aranjuez (1984)

Professional ratings
Review scores
Source	Rating
AllMusic	3/5 stars
Sputnikmusic	3.5/5

Django/Misty is a studio album by jazz harpist Dorothy Ashby released via the Philips Records label in 1984. The album is named after two famous jazz compositions.

== Track listing ==
No.	Title	Writer(s)	Length
1.	"Django"	John Lewis	5:00
2.	"Softly, as in a Morning Sunrise"	Sigmund Romberg	3:24
3.	"Round Midnight"	Thelonious Monk / Cootie Williams	4:52
4.	"Blues for Mr. K"	Dorothy Ashby	3:43
5.	"My Favourite Things"	Richard Rodgers	5:49
6.	"September in the Rain"	Harry Warren	4:10
7.	"Misty"	Erroll Garner	3:45
8.	"Amor en Paz"	Antonio Carlos Jobim	3:20
Total length:			34:03

== Credits ==
- Design – Naoe Arano
- Harp – Dorothy Ashby
- Illustration – Yōko Ochida
