= Blues for a Reason =

Studio album by Chet Baker Quintet featuring Warne Marsh
- Released: 1985
- Recorded: September 30, 1984
- Studio: Studio 44, Monster, Holland
- Genre: Jazz
- Length: 57:33
- Label: Criss Cross Jazz
- Producer: Gerry Teekens

Chet Baker chronology
Chet Baker Plays Vladimir Cosma (1984)	Blues for a Reason (1985)	My Foolish Heart (1985)

Blues for a Reason is an album by trumpeter Chet Baker which was recorded in 1984 and released by Criss Cross Jazz.

== Reception ==
Professional ratings
Review scores
Source	Rating
The Penguin Guide to Jazz	4/4 stars
Allmusic	4.5/5 stars

The Penguin Guide to Jazz noted "Blues for a Reason stands out from much of the work of the period in including relatively unfamiliar charts, including three by Chet himself. ... This is an important and quietly salutary album that confounds the more casual dismissals of the trumpeter's latter-day work". The Allmusic review states "This combination works quite well. For what might have been the only time in their careers, trumpeter Chet Baker and tenor-saxophonist Warne Marsh were teamed together in a quintet ... Recommended".

== Track listing ==
All compositions by Chet Baker except where noted.

1. "Well Spoken" (Warne Marsh) – 9:05
2. "If You Could See Me Now" (Tadd Dameron) – 5:35
3. "We Know It's Love" – 6:28
4. "Looking Good Tonight" – 8:28
5. "Imagination" (Jimmy Van Heusen, Johnny Burke) – 7:30
6. "Blues for a Reason" – 8:38
7. "Looking Good Tonight" [Take 2] – 5:19 Bonus track on CD release
8. "We Know It's Love" [Take 2] – 6:30 Bonus track on CD release

== Personnel ==
- Chet Baker – trumpet
- Warne Marsh – tenor saxophone
- Hod O'Brien – piano
- Cecil McBee – bass
- Eddie Gladden – drums
