= The Fantastic Jazz Harp of Dorothy Ashby =

Studio album by Dorothy Ashby
- Released: 1965
- Recorded: May 3–4, 1965; New York City
- Genre: Jazz
- Label: Atlantic; 1447
- Producer: Arif Mardin and Ollie McLaughlin

Dorothy Ashby chronology
Dorothy Ashby (1962)	The Fantastic Jazz Harp of Dorothy Ashby (1965)	Afro-Harping (1968)

The Fantastic Jazz Harp of Dorothy Ashby is an album by jazz harpist Dorothy Ashby recorded in 1965 and released on the Atlantic label.

== Reception ==
Professional ratings
Review scores
Source	Rating
Allmusic	3.5/5 stars
DownBeat	4/5 stars

Allmusic reviewed the album awarding it 3½ stars stating "On 1965's The Fantastic Jazz Harp of Dorothy Ashby, the harpist is joined by bassist Richard Davis, drummer Grady Tate, percussionist Willie Bobo, and a sporadic horn section on four Ashby originals and six standards".

== Track listing ==
All compositions by Dorothy Ashby except as indicated

1. "Flighty" - 3:30
2. "Essence of Sapphire" - 3:14
3. "Why Did You Leave Me" - 2:58
4. "I Will Follow You" (Jerry Herman) - 3:08
5. "What Am I Here For" (Duke Ellington, Frankie Laine) - 2:21
6. "House of the Rising Sun" (Traditional) - 3:01
7. "Invitation" (Bronisław Kaper, Paul Francis Webster) - 2:59
8. "Nabu Corfa" - 3:47
9. "Feeling Good" (Anthony Newley, Leslie Bricusse) - 5:15
10. "Dodi Li" (Traditional) - 2:18

== Personnel ==
- Dorothy Ashby - harp
- Jimmy Cleveland, Quentin Jackson, Sonny Russo, Tony Studd - trombone (tracks 3, 5, 6, 8, 9 & 10)
- Richard Davis - bass
- Grady Tate - drums
- Willie Bobo - percussion (tracks 1 & 4–10)

=== Production ===
- Arif Mardin and Ollie McLaughlin - producers
- Tom Dowd - engineer
