= Ain't That a Shame (album) =

Studio album by Pat Boone
- Released: 1964
- Genre: Pop
- Label: Dot

Pat Boone chronology
The Touch of Your Lips (1964)	Ain't That a Shame (1964)	The Lord's Prayer and Other Great Hymns (1964)

Professional ratings
Review scores
Source	Rating
AllMusic	3/5 stars

Ain't That a Shame is the 24th studio album by Pat Boone. it was released in 1964 on Dot Records.

According to the AllMusic review by Arthur Rowe, the album is compiled of "leftovers from various recording sessions" from 1960 to 1963, with the exception of the title track, Boone's 1955 hit "Ain't That a Shame", appearing "in its original version with added reverb".

== Track listing ==
Side one
No.	Title	Writer(s)	Length
1.	"Ain't That a Shame"	Domino; Bartholomew
2.	"In the Room (Where I'm Missing You)"	Jan Crutchfield
3.	"Sunday, Monday or Always"	Burke; Van Heusen
4.	"Mister Moon"	Winfield Scott
5.	"He'll Have to Go"	J. Allison; A. Allison
6.	"In My Little Red Book"	Stillman; Bloch; Simon

Side two
No.	Title	Writer(s)	Length
1.	"That's Me Without You"	Johnson; - Glason - Coots
2.	"Everybody's Somebody's Fool"	Greenfield; Keller
3.	"It Sure Looks Lonesome Outside"	Gary Bruce
4.	"While You Were Away"
5.	"Where Are You"	Adamson; McHugh
6.	"Venus"	Ed Marshall
