= Herman Wright =

American jazz bassist (1932–1997)

Herman Wright (1932 - 1997) was an American jazz double bassist.

born in Detroit, Michigan, he began on drums as a teen before ultimately settling on upright bass. He worked with Dorothy Ashby, Wes Montgomery,Terry Gibbs, beat poet Allen Ginsberg, Yusef Lateef, George Shearing, Doug Watkins and on one occasion substituted for Charles Mingus when the latter wanted to play piano. He can also be heard on Allen Ginsberg's Ginsberg Sings Blake.

In 1960, he moved to New York City, where he resided until his death in 1997.

He had three sons, Herman Wright Jr. (brass and woodwinds), Paris Wright (drums), and Dewayne Wright (piano).

== Discography ==
=== As sideman ===
With Dorothy Ashby

- Hip Harp (Prestige, 1958)
- In a Minor Groove (New Jazz, 1958)
- Dorothy Ashby (Argo, 1961)
- Soft Winds (Jazzland, 1961)

With Chet Baker

- Smokin' with the Chet Baker Quintet (Prestige, 1965)
- Groovin' with the Chet Baker Quintet (Prestige, 1965)
- Comin' On with the Chet Baker Quintet (Prestige, 1965)
- Cool Burnin' with the Chet Baker Quintet (Prestige, 1965)
- Boppin' with the Chet Baker Quintet (Prestige, 1965)

With Allen Ginsberg

- Songs of Innocence and Experience (MGM, 1970)

With Al Grey

- Snap Your Fingers (Argo, 1962)
- Having a Ball (Argo, 1963)

With Yusef Lateef

- Cry! - Tender (New Jazz, 1959)
- The Three Faces of Yusef Lateef (Riverside, 1960)
- Into Something (New Jazz, 1961)
- The Golden Flute (Impulse!, 1966)

With Wes Montgomery

- Maximum Swing, The Unissued 1965 Half Note Recordings (Resonance Records, 2023)

With Billy Mitchell

- This Is Billy Mitchell (Smash, 1962)
- A Little Juicy (Smash, 1963)

With Archie Shepp

- Lover Man (Timeless, 1989)

With Sonny Stitt

- Pow! (Prestige, 1965 [1967])

With Doug Watkins

- Soulnik (New Jazz, 1960)
