= Concierto de Aranjuez (Dorothy Ashby album) =

Studio album by Dorothy Ashby
- Released: 1984
- Recorded: March 7–8, 1983
- Studio: Capital Recording Studio, Hollywood
- Genre: Jazz
- Label: Philips Records 814 197-2
- Producer: Kiyoshi Koyama

Dorothy Ashby chronology
Django/Misty (1984)	Concierto de Aranjuez (1984)

Professional ratings
Review scores
Source	Rating
AllMusic	3/5 stars

Concierto de Aranjuez is a studio album by jazz harpist Dorothy Ashby released via the Philips Records label in 1984. The record is her final album as a leader.

== Track listing ==
No.	Title	Writer(s)	Length
1.	"Concierto de Aranjuez"	Joaquín Rodrigo	9:26
2.	"Gypsy Airs"	Pablo de Sarasate	3:51
3.	"Green Sleeves"	Traditional	4:30
4.	"Gershwin Melody: Summer Time / Someone to Watch Over Me / Porgy"	George Gershwin	7:49
5.	"Autumn Leaves"	Joseph Kosma	5:14
6.	"Dear Old Stockholm"	Traditional	3:14
7.	"Yesterday"	Lennon–McCartney	2:57

== Credits ==
- Dorothy Ashby – harp
- Yōko Ochida – illustration
- Naoe Arano – design

Credits for Concierto de Aranjuez adapted from liner notes.
