= In a Minor Groove =

Studio album by Dorothy Ashby with Frank Wess
- Released: 1958
- Recorded: September 19, 1958
- Studio: Van Gelder Studio, Hackensack, New Jersey
- Genre: Jazz
- Length: 39:16
- Label: New Jazz; NJLP 8209
- Producer: Bob Weinstock

Dorothy Ashby chronology
Hip Harp (1958)	In a Minor Groove (1958)	Soft Winds (1961)

In a Minor Groove (also released as Dorothy Ashby Plays for Beautiful People) is an album by American jazz harpist Dorothy Ashby recorded in 1958 and released on the New Jazz label.

== Reception ==
Professional ratings
Review scores
Source	Rating
Allmusic	4.5/5 stars

Allmusic reviewed a compilation that contains this album plus another awarding the package 4½ stars stating "This is a delightful package that deserves further recognition as a project unique to jazz and modern music, perfectly showcasing Dorothy Ashby as an individualist for the ages".

== Track listing ==
All compositions by Dorothy Ashby except where noted

1. "Rascallity" – 3:54
2. "You'd Be So Nice to Come Home To" (Cole Porter) – 3:59
3. "It's a Minor Thing" – 3:56
4. "Yesterdays" (Otto Harbach, Jerome Kern) – 4:22
5. "Bohemia After Dark" (Oscar Pettiford) – 6:19
6. "Taboo" (Margarita Lecuona, Bob Russell) – 6:15
7. "Autumn in Rome" (Sammy Cahn, Alessandro Cicognini, Paul Weston) – 5:33
8. "Alone Together" (Howard Dietz, Arthur Schwartz) – 4:58

== Personnel ==
- Dorothy Ashby – harp
- Frank Wess – flute
- Herman Wright – bass
- Roy Haynes – drums

=== Production ===
- Bob Weinstock – supervisor
- Rudy Van Gelder – engineer
