= Hip Harp =

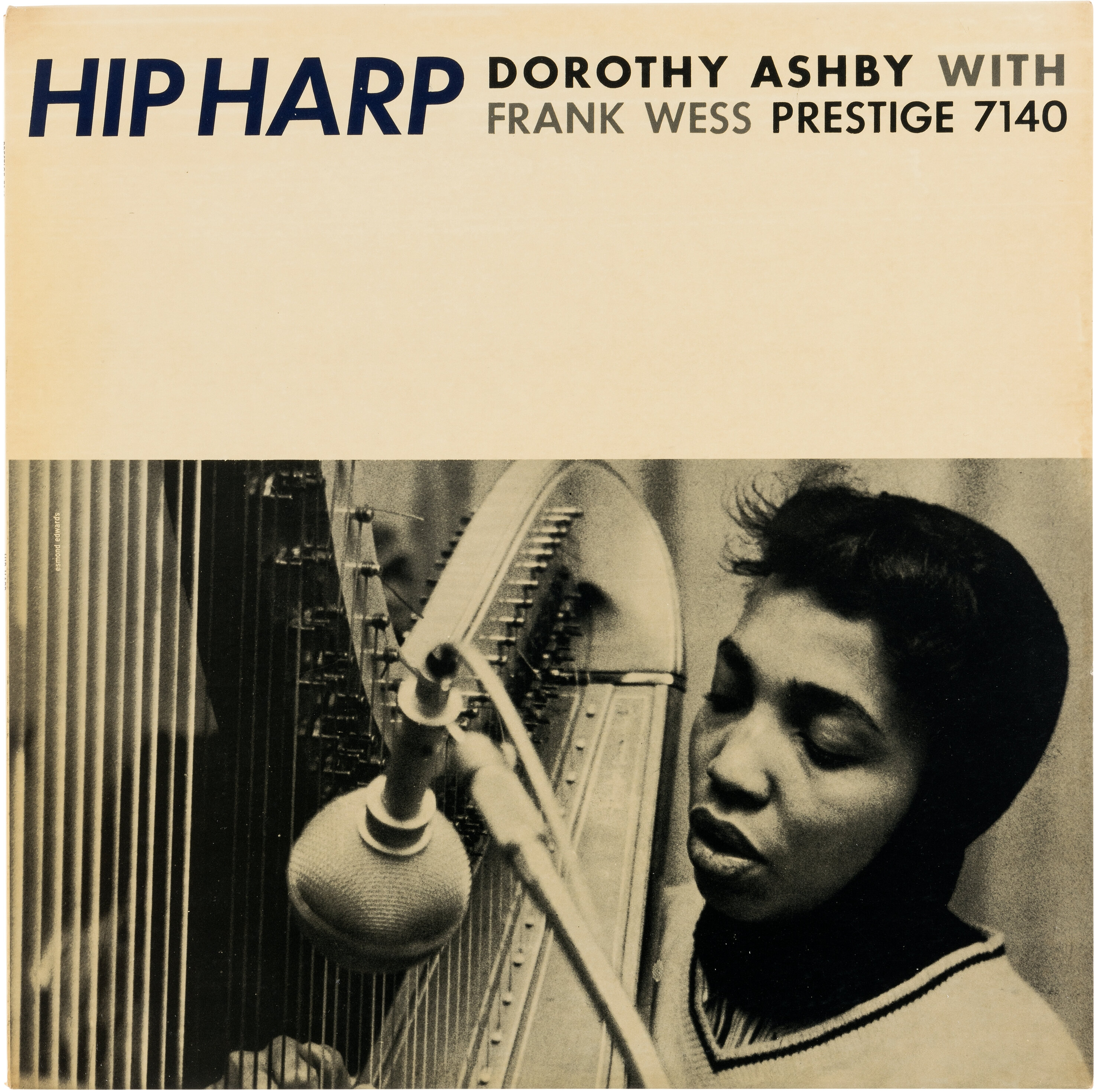

Studio album by Dorothy Ashby with Frank Wess
- Released: 1958
- Recorded: March 21, 1958; Van Gelder Studio, Hackensack, New Jersey
- Genre: Jazz
- Length: 35:51
- Label: Prestige; PR 7140; PR 7638
- Producer: Bob Weinstock

Dorothy Ashby chronology
The Jazz Harpist (1957)	Hip Harp (1958)	In a Minor Groove (1958)

Hip Harp (also released as The Best of Dorothy Ashby) is an album by jazz harpist Dorothy Ashby recorded in 1958 and released on the Prestige label.

== Reception ==
Professional ratings
Review scores
Source	Rating
Allmusic	4.5/5 stars
Sputnikmusic	4.1/5

Allmusic reviewed the album awarding it 4½ stars.

== Track listing ==
All compositions by Dorothy Ashby except as indicated

1. "Pawky" - 7:07
2. "Moonlight in Vermont" (John Blackburn, Karl Suessdorf) - 5:17
3. "Back Talk" - 5:07
4. "Dancing in the Dark" (Howard Dietz, Arthur Schwartz) - 4:45
5. "Charmaine" (Lew Pollack, Erno Rapee) - 4:04
6. "Jollity" - 3:38
7. "There's a Small Hotel" (Lorenz Hart, Richard Rodgers) - 5:53

== Personnel ==
- Dorothy Ashby - harp
- Frank Wess - flute
- Herman Wright - bass
- Art Taylor - drums

=== Production ===
- Bob Weinstock - supervisor
- Rudy Van Gelder - engineer
