= Dorothy's Harp =

Studio album by Dorothy Ashby
- Released: 1969
- Recorded: March 1969
- Studio: Ter Mar Studios, Chicago.
- Genre: Jazz, Soul-Jazz
- Length: 35:03
- Label: Cadet LPS 825
- Producer: Richard Evans

Dorothy Ashby chronology
Afro-Harping (1968)	Dorothy's Harp (1969)	The Rubaiyat of Dorothy Ashby (1970)

Dorothy's Harp is a studio album by jazz harpist Dorothy Ashby released in 1969 via the Cadet label. A few years after releasing Dorothy’s Harp, she started working with Stevie Wonder. The record includes two Brazilian-touched compositions: "Reza" and "Canto de Ossanha". The album was re-released as a CD in 2006.

== Reception ==
A reviewer of Dusty Groove wrote "One of the grooviest Dorothy Ashby albums of the 60s – a set that has her already-great jazz work on harp backed by Chicago soul arrangements from Richard Evans – all in a blend that's somewhere in the territory of the Soulful Strings, but even groovier! And as an added bonus, Odell Brown even plays a bit of Fender Rhodes on the record – which sounds especially great! Both Ashby and Evans are at the height of their powers here – mixing together bits of jazz, soul, and trippier elements in a sublime late 60s Cadet Records blend – one that's carried off perfectly on the original tunes "Truth Spoken Here", "Tornado", "Cause I Need It", and "Just Had To Tell Somebody" – but which also sounds great on some of the album's cool covers too! Other titles include Brazilian numbers "Reza" and "Canto De Ossanha" – both of which are transformed in Dorothy's hands – plus "This Girl's In Love", "By the Time I Get to Phoenix", and "Windmills of Your Mind"!".

== Track listing ==
No.	Title	Writer(s)	Length
1.	"By The Time I Get To Phoenix"	Jimmy Webb	3:31
2.	"Canto De Ossanha"	Baden Powell, Vinicius De Moraes	3:37
3.	"Love Is Blue"	André Popp, Bryan Blackburn	2:53
4.	"Reza"	Edu Lobo, Ruy Guerra	3:01
5.	"This Girl's In Love with You"	Burt Bacharach and Hal David	2:50
6.	"Truth Spoken Here"	Richard Evans	2:52
7.	"Toronado"	Richard Evans	3:06
8.	"The Windmills of Your Mind"	Alan and Marilyn Bergman, Michel Legrand	3:22
9.	"Cause I Need It"	Dorothy Ashby	3:02
10.	"Just Had To Tell Somebody"	Dorothy Ashby	3:09
11.	"Fool on the Hill"	John Lennon, Paul McCartney	3:40
Total length:			35:03

== Personnel ==
- Design – Randy Harter
- Electric piano [Fender] – Odell Brown
- Engineer – Stu Black
- Flute – Lennie Druss (tracks: B5)
- Oboe – Lennie Druss (tracks: B3)
- Photography – Jeff Lowenthal
- Producer – Richard Evans
