= Dorothy Ashby (album) =

Studio album by Dorothy Ashby
- Released: 1962
- Recorded: August 8, 1961; Ter Mar Studios, Chicago
- Genre: Jazz
- Label: Argo; LPS-690
- Producer: Max Cooperstein

Dorothy Ashby chronology
Soft Winds (1961)	Dorothy Ashby (1962)	The Fantastic Jazz Harp of Dorothy Ashby (1965)

Dorothy Ashby is a self-titled album by jazz harpist Dorothy Ashby, released on the Argo label in 1962.

== Reception ==
Professional ratings
Review scores
Source	Rating
AllMusic	3/5 stars

AllMusic rated the album 3 stars.

== Track listing ==
All compositions by Dorothy Ashby except as indicated

1. "Lonely Melody" (Ollie McLaughlin) - 3:45
2. "Secret Love" (Sammy Fain, Paul Francis Webster) - 3:32
3. "Gloomy Sunday" (Rezső Seress, László Jávor, Sam M. Lewis) - 2:34
4. "Satin Doll" (Duke Ellington) - 5:08
5. "John R." - 3:15
6. "Li'l Darlin'" (Neal Hefti) - 4:29
7. "Booze" - 2:15
8. "Django" (John Lewis) - 4:30
9. "You Stepped Out of a Dream" (Nacio Herb Brown, Gus Kahn) - 3:25
10. "Stranger in Paradise" (Robert Wright, George Forrest) - 3:14

== Personnel ==
- Dorothy Ashby - harp
- Herman Wright - bass
- John Tooley - drums
