= The Rubáiyát of Dorothy Ashby =

1970 studio album by jazz harpist Dorothy Ashby

Studio album by Dorothy Ashby
- Released: 1970, 2007 (reissue)
- Recorded: November 1969 – January 1970
- Studio: Ter Mar Studios, Chicago
- Genre: Jazz, jazz fusion, ethno jazz, experimental jazz
- Length: 39:17
- Label: Cadet; LPS-841 Dusty Groove (reissue); DGA 3002
- Producer: Richard Evans

Dorothy Ashby chronology
Dorothy's Harp (1969)	The Rubáiyát of Dorothy Ashby (1970)	Django/Misty (1984)

The Rubáiyát of Dorothy Ashby (subtitled Original compositions inspired by the words of Omar Khayyam, arranged and conducted by Richard Evans) is an album by jazz harpist Dorothy Ashby recorded in late 1969 and early 1970 and released on the Cadet label. On this album, Ashby plays the Japanese musical instrument, the koto, demonstrating her abilities to successfully integrate another instrument into jazz.

== Reception ==
Professional ratings
Review scores
Source	Rating
AllMusic	4.5/5 stars
Record Collector	4/5 stars
Sputnikmusic	4/5

Reviewing the album for AllMusic, Thom Jurek writes: "this is a head record. Time and space are suspended and new dimensions open up for anyone willing to take this killer little set on and let it spill its magic into the mind canal through the ears. Depending on how much of a jazz purist you are will give you a side to debate the place of this set in Ashby's catalogue. For those who remain open, this may be her greatest moment on record …"

A reviewer of Dusty Groove stated: "Incredible work from the amazing Dorothy Ashby – a brilliant set of funky and spiritual tunes, set to full backings from Chicago soul arranger Richard Evans! This album is easily one of Ashby's greatest, and it's dedicated to the writings of Omar Khayyam – one of the forces guiding Dorothy's more spiritual sound at the end of the 60s, clearly opened up in a way that's not unlike the direction of Alice Coltrane's work, but a lot more focused and a lot more funky! Ashby not only plays her usual jazz harp, but also koto as well, and even sings a bit too – and the larger group directed by Evans features work by Stu Katz on vibes and kalimba, Lenny Druss on flutes, and Cash McCall on guitar – all in a groove that's really a precursor to the Earth Wind & Fire generation of the Chicago scene!"

== Track listing ==
All compositions by Dorothy Ashby.

No.	Title	Length
1.	"Myself When Young"	5:16
2.	"For Some We Loved"	4:02
3.	"Wax and Wane"	4:25
4.	"Drink"	2:30
5.	"Wine"	3:56
6.	"Dust"	2:51
7.	"Joyful Grass and Grape"	3:38
8.	"Shadow Shapes"	3:32
9.	"Heaven and Hell"	3:10
10.	"The Moving Finger"	5:39
Total length:		38:59

== Personnel ==
- Dorothy Ashby – harp, koto, vocals
- Lenny Druss – flute, oboe, piccolo flute (tracks 1–5 & 10)
- Cliff Davis – alto saxophone (track 10)
- Stu Katz – vibraphone (tracks 1, 3, 4, 6 & 8–10)
- Cash McCall – guitar (track 10)
- Fred Katz – kalimba (tracks 2, 3 & 10)
- Ed Green – violin (track 2)
- Unidentified orchestra arranged and conducted by Richard Evans
