= Afro-Harping =

Studio album by Dorothy Ashby
- Released: 1968
- Recorded: February 1968; Ter Mar Studios, Chicago
- Genre: Jazz-funk; soul jazz
- Length: 35:56
- Label: Cadet; LPS-809
- Producer: Richard Evans

Dorothy Ashby chronology
The Fantastic Jazz Harp of Dorothy Ashby (1965)	Afro-Harping (1968)	Dorothy's Harp (1969)

Afro-Harping is an album by jazz harpist Dorothy Ashby recorded in February 1968 and released on the Cadet label.

== Reception ==
Professional ratings
Review scores
Source	Rating
Allmusic	4/5 stars
Mojo	4/5 stars

Ron Wynn of Allmusic deemed Afro-Harping "the best and most complete album" by Ashby, on which she "turned the harp into a lead instrument, and offered solos that were as tough and memorable as those done by any reed, brass, or percussion player."

A reviewer of Dusty Groove called it "One of the grooviest records ever – a sublime blend of African percussion, soulful orchestrations, and Dorothy Ashby's amazing electric harp...breaking down genres and expectations in the trademark style of the best late 60s sides from the Chicago underground. The record's got a bit of funk, a bit of jazz, and a heck of a lot of soul – and the setting works perfectly for Dorothy's harp, giving it a lot more room to work around than some of her smaller jazz combo albums".

== Track listing ==
1. "Soul Vibrations" (Richard Evans) - 3:22
2. "Games" (Dorothy Ashby) - 3:57
3. "Action Line" (Ashby) - 3:43
4. "Lonely Girl" (Redd Evans, Neal Hefti, Jay Livingston) - 3:15
5. "Life Has Its Trials" (Ashby) - 4:31
6. "Afro-Harping" (Ashby, Phil Upchurch) - 3:01
7. "Little Sunflower" (Freddie Hubbard) - 3:47
8. "Valley of the Dolls" (André Previn, Dory Previn) - 3:35
9. "Come Live With Me" (Russ Carlyle, Mike Caranda, Ivan Washabaugh) - 2:39
10. "The Look of Love" (Burt Bacharach, Hal David) - 4:06

== Personnel ==
- Dorothy Ashby - harp
- Unidentified orchestra arranged and conducted by Richard Evans
