= Larry Levine (fashion designer) =

American fashion designer

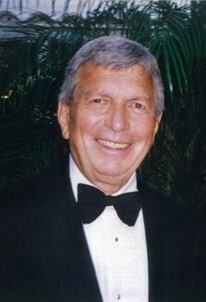
- Larry Levine in 2005
- Born: May 10, 1926; Bensonhurst, Brooklyn, New York, United States
- Died: February 9, 2008 (aged 81); Sarasota, Florida, United States
- Occupation: fashion designer

Larry Levine (May 10, 1926 – February 9, 2008) was an American designer of coats and suits.

He was born in Bensonhurst, Brooklyn to Polish, Jewish immigrants. He served in the US Navy in World War II and eventually got a job as a road salesman for Capri Coat in the 1940s. In 1951, Levine founded Larry Levine, Inc. By the mid-1960s his traditional, classic, coats and suits were sold in virtually every clothing store in the country. Larry Levine was one of a very few clothing manufacturers of his time to brand his own name. In the early 1970s, Larry Levine hired London based designer Gerald McCann to come to New York and design exclusively for him. Their successful partnership lasted through the 1990s. Levine created two labels for McCann: Gerald McCann and Emily Lawrence, LTD. Stan Rutstein, former president of Casual Corner, called Larry Levine Inc. "the strongest label in women's outerwear in the United States from the sixties through the eighties".

Levine's daughters, Anne Levine and Elena Levine, both worked with their father in design, styling and sales. Elena went on to design for Anne Klein's coat division. Anne had an eponymous line manufactured by MDP, Inc. in the 1990s. Levine's wife, Emily ran a group of retail stores called Emily Lawrence.

Levine sold part of his company to S. Rothschild, Inc. in 1991 but remained president. In 1996, Levine cut all ties with S. Rothschild.

Larry Levine coats and suits are an integral part of Federated Stores' matrix with garments sold in Macy's, Lord & Taylor and Nordstrom's.
