= The Jazz Harpist =

Studio album by Dorothy Ashby
- Released: March 21, 1957
- Recorded: August 1956
- Studio: Van Gelder Studio, Hackensack, New Jersey.
- Genre: Jazz
- Length: 29:31
- Label: Regent; MG-6039
- Producer: Ozzie Cadena

Dorothy Ashby chronology
The Jazz Harpist (1957)	Hip Harp (1958)

The Jazz Harpist is the debut studio album by American jazz harpist Dorothy Ashby released in 1957 by the Regent label.

== Reception ==
Professional ratings
Review scores
Source	Rating
Allmusic	4.5/5 stars
Sputnikmusic	3/5

Allmusic reviewed the album awarding it 4½ stars stating "Her first, and best, album has Frank Wess on flute".

A reviewer of Dusty Groove wrote 'Jazz harpist Dorothy Ashby has always had one of the most unusual sounds around – and even though it might sound a bit crazy at first, her mix of harp playing with tight jazzy backing is always a winning combination. This early album has Ms Ashby playing with a groovy little combo that includes Frank Wess on flute, Ed Thigpen on drums, and Wendell Marshall on bass. Even at this early age, Dorothy shows her writing skills well with the originals "Aeolian Groove, "Lamentation", and "Spicy" – and she does a nice job with the other standards she chooses to cover. A nice record, with a soulful sound that you wouldn't expect!"

== Track listing ==
All compositions by Dorothy Ashby except as indicated

1. "Thou Swell" (Lorenz Hart, Richard Rodgers) - 4:02
2. "Stella by Starlight" (Ned Washington, Victor Young) - 3:09
3. "Dancing on the Ceiling" (Hart, Rodgers) - 7:31
4. "Aeolian Groove" - 4:16
5. "Quietude" - 2:52
6. "Spicy" - 3:41
7. "Lamentation" - 4:03

== Personnel ==
- Dorothy Ashby - harp
- Frank Wess - flute
- Eddie Jones (tracks 3, 6 & 7), Wendell Marshall (tracks 1, 2, 4 & 5) - bass
- Ed Thigpen - drums

=== Production ===
- Ozzie Cadena - supervisor
- Rudy Van Gelder - engineer
