= Nicola Stilo =

Italian musician

Nicola Stilo (born 1956 in Italy), is a jazz and pop instrumentalist, specialising in flute and guitar.

Stilo began following Chet Baker in 1979, attending his concerts and recording sessions. Baker took him as part of his band for a tour of Italy the following year, and on subsequent tours, including to Brazil in 1985. After the last, Stilo stayed in Brazil for around a year before reuniting with Baker. Despite discouragement from Baker, who was a long-term drug addict, Stilo by this time had become addicted to heroin. Back together in Europe, Stilo commented: "Maybe I made the choice just to live the same life he was doing, you know? [...] We were like brothers, maybe sometimes fighting, but really taking care of each other." They continued to play together, with Stilo on flute and guitar. Stilo wrote the music for Baker's 1988 album Chet on Poetry; it "ranged from slick Europop to funk to a graceful jazz waltz". He also played on the album. He appeared on film in the 1988 documentary Let's Get Lost. After Baker's death later that year, Stilo gave up heroin.

Stilo subsequently recorded with Toninho Horta and with his own group.

== Discography ==
=== As leader/co-leader ===
- Flute Connection (1994)
- Errata Corrige (1995)
- Duets (1999)
- Immagini (Alfamusic, 2007)

=== As sideman ===
With Chet Baker

- Leaving (Intercord, 1980)
- At Capolinea (Red, 1983 [1987])
- Intimacy (Red Records, 1987)
- Let's Get Lost (RCA Novus, 1987)
- Chet on Poetry (1988)
- Live in Rosenheim: Chet Baker's Last Recording as Quartet (1988)
