= Soft Winds (album) =

Studio album by Dorothy Ashby
- Released: 1961
- Recorded: August 15 & 16, 1961; Plaza Sounds Studios, New York City
- Genre: Jazz
- Label: Jazzland; JLP 61
- Producer: John Levy

Dorothy Ashby chronology
In a Minor Groove (1958)	Soft Winds (1961)	Dorothy Ashby (1962)

Soft Winds (subtitled The Swinging Harp of Dorothy Ashby) is an album by jazz harpist Dorothy Ashby recorded in 1961 and released on the Jazzland label. The album takes its name from Goodman's 1940 standard "Soft Winds" which features as the first track.

== Reception ==
Professional ratings
Review scores
Source	Rating
Down Beat	3/5 stars
Allmusic	3/5 stars

Users on Allmusic have awarded the album an average of 3 stars.

== Track listing ==
All compositions by Dorothy Ashby except as indicated

1. "Soft Winds" (Benny Goodman) – 2:56
2. "Wild Is the Wind" (Dimitri Tiomkin, Ned Washington) – 4:21
3. "The Man I Love" (George Gershwin, Ira Gershwin) – 2:56
4. "My Ship" (Kurt Weill, Ira Gershwin) – 3:40
5. "Love Is Here to Stay" (George Gershwin, Ira Gershwin) – 2:42
6. "I've Never Been in Love Before" (Frank Loesser) – 2:27
7. "With Strings Attached" – 2:25
8. "Laura" (Johnny Mercer, David Raksin) – 2:59
9. "The Guns of Navarone" (Tiomkin) – 2:15
10. "Misty" (Erroll Garner) – 2:42
11. "The Gypsy in My Soul" (Clay Boland, Moe Jaffe) – 2:49

== Personnel ==
- Dorothy Ashby – harp
- Terry Pollard – piano, vibraphone
- Herman Wright – bass
- Jimmy Cobb – drums

=== Production ===
- John Levy – producer
- Ray Fowler – engineer
