= Someday My Prince Will Come (Chet Baker album) =

Live album by Chet Baker Trio
- Released: 1983
- Recorded: October 4, 1979
- Venue: Jazzhus Montmartre, Copenhagen, Denmark
- Genre: Jazz
- Length: 54:32 CD release with bonus tracks
- Label: SteepleChase; SCS 1180
- Producer: Nils Winther

Chet Baker chronology
This Is Always (1979)	Someday My Prince Will Come (1983)	Chet Baker / Wolfgang Lackerschmid (1979)

Someday My Prince Will Come is a live album by trumpeter/vocalist Chet Baker which was recorded in 1979 at the Jazzhus Montmartre and released on the Danish SteepleChase label.

Professional ratings
Review scores
Source	Rating
Allmusic	3/5 stars
The Penguin Guide to Jazz Recordings	3/4 stars

== Track listing ==
1. "Gnid" (Tadd Dameron) – 8:33 Bonus track on CD release
2. "Love Vibrations" (Horace Silver) – 9:51 Bonus track on CD release
3. "Sad Walk" (Bob Zieff) – 10:41
4. "Someday My Prince Will Come" (Frank Churchill, Larry Morey) – 7:48
5. "I'm Old Fashioned" (Jerome Kern, Johnny Mercer) – 7:25
6. "In Your Own Sweet Way" (Dave Brubeck) – 10:12

== Personnel ==
- Chet Baker – trumpet, vocals
- Doug Raney – guitar
- Niels-Henning Ørsted Pedersen – bass
