= Chet Baker / Wolfgang Lackerschmid =

1980 studio album by Chet Baker

Studio album by Chet Baker and Wolfgang Lackerschmid featuring Larry Coryell, Buster Williams and Tony Williams
- Released: 1980
- Recorded: November 1979
- Studio: Tonstudio Zuckerfabrik, Stuttgart, West Germany
- Genre: Jazz
- Length: 36:07
- Label: Sandra Music Productions; SMP 2110
- Producer: Sandra Music Productions

Chet Baker chronology
Someday My Prince Will Come (1979)	Chet Baker / Wolfgang Lackerschmid (1980)	Chet Baker / Steve Houben (1979)

Chet Baker / Wolfgang Lackerschmid is an album by trumpeter Chet Baker and vibraphonist Wolfgang Lackerschmid with guitarist Larry Coryell, bassist Buster Williams and drummer Tony Williams which was recorded in 1979 and first released on the Lackerschmid's Sandra Music Productions label.

== Reception ==
Professional ratings
Review scores
Source	Rating
Allmusic	2.5/5 stars

The Allmusic review by Scott Yanow states "The mostly little-known material (five originals by the sidemen plus "Here's That Rainy Day") suits Baker fine. The emphasis is on slower tempoes (other than Buster Williams' closing blues) including a pair of jazz waltzes. Baker's chops sound fine within the limited scope that he plays. The overall results are not essential but are worthwhile.".

== Track listing ==
1. "Mr. Biko" (Tony Williams) – 9:13
2. "Balzwaltz" (Wolfgang Lackerschmid) – 6:54
3. "The Latin One" (Larry Coryell) – 2:30
4. "Rue Gregoire du Tour" (Coryell) – 6:39
5. "Here's That Rainy Day" (Jimmy Van Heusen, Johnny Burke) – 4:19
6. "Toku Do" (Buster Williams) – 6:32

== Personnel ==
- Chet Baker – trumpet
- Wolfgang Lackerschmid – vibraphone
- Larry Coryell – guitar
- Buster Williams – bass
- Tony Williams – drums
