= Rendez-Vous (Chet Baker album) =

Studio album by Chet Baker, Jean Paul Florens, Henry Florens
- Released: 1980
- Recorded: September 4–5, 1979
- Studio: John Melner Studio, London, England
- Genre: Jazz
- Length: 36:20
- Label: Bingow; BGW 3104
- Producer: Philippe Gaviglio

Chet Baker chronology
The Touch of Your Lips (1979)	Rendez-Vous (1980)	All Blues (1979)

Rendez-Vous is an album by trumpeter/vocalist Chet Baker which was recorded in 1979 and released on the French Bingow label.

Professional ratings
Review scores
Source	Rating
The Rolling Stone Jazz Record Guide	3/5 stars

== Track listing ==
1. "Blues for Inge" (Jean Paul Florens) – 4:30
2. "What's New?" (Bob Haggart, Johnny Burke) – 5:01
3. "Old Date" (Henry Florens) – 6:16
4. "Darn That Dream" (Jimmy Van Heusen, Eddie DeLange) – 3:42
5. "My Funny Valentine" [Take II] (Richard Rodgers, Lorenz Hart) – 5:22
6. "Secret Love" (Sammy Fain, Paul Francis Webster) – 5:41
7. "Round Midnight" [Take II] (Thelonious Monk) – 5:48

== Personnel ==
- Chet Baker – trumpet, vocals
- Henry Florens – piano
- Jean Paul Florens – guitar
- Jim Richardson – bass
- Tony Mann – drums
