= At Capolinea =

Studio album by Chet Baker
- Released: 1984
- Recorded: October 1983
- Studio: Cap Studio, Milan, Italy
- Genre: Cool jazz
- Length: 41:01
- Label: Red Records
- Producer: Giorgio Vanni

Chet Baker chronology
Crystal Bells (1983)	At Capolinea (1983)	Live at New Morning (1983)

Al Capolinia Cover

At Capolinea is an album by jazz trumpeter Chet Baker, recorded in Milan and originally on the Italian Jii label as Al Capolinea before being more widely released by Red Records. It features, among others, Italian guitarist Nicola Stilo and French pianist Michel Graillier, both of which contributed with original compositions.

== Reception ==
Professional ratings
Review scores
Source	Rating
Allmusic	3/5 stars

The Allmusic review by Steve Loewy states "This studio session is distinguished by excellent, mostly Italian jazz tunes, and a very attractive group of players not usually associated with the trumpeter. ... This amounts to a very accessible, enjoyable set of tunes -- one that may not win any awards, but should reward those who appreciate the delicate and lovely nature of Chet Baker's art".

== Track listing ==
=== Side A ===
1. "Estate" (Bruno Martino, Bruno Brighetti) – 11:45
2. "Francamente" (Nicola Stilo) – 5:12
3. "Dream Drop" (Michel Graillier) – 4:20

=== Side B ===
1. "Lament" (J. J. Johnson) – 9:30
2. "Pioggia sul deserto" (Stilo) – 5:24
3. "Finestra sul mare" (Stilo) – 6:50

== Personnel ==
- Chet Baker – trumpet
- Diane Vavra – soprano saxophone
- Nicola Stilo – guitar, flute
- Michel Graillier – piano
- Riccardo dal Frà – bass
- Leo Mitchell – drums
