= Rachel Gould =

American jazz musician

- Born: 25 June 1953 (age 72); Camden, New Jersey, USA
- Genres: jazz
- Occupations: singer, composer
- Years active: 1972 –
- Website: rachelgould.net

Rachel Gould (born June 25, 1953, in Camden, New Jersey, as Rachel Field) is an American singer and teacher of Modern Jazz.

== Life and works ==
Gould studied cello and classical singing at Boston University.

She established herself as a jazz musician upon moving to Germany in 1975, formed her own quartet and toured Europe. She formed her own quartet and toured Europe. In 1979, she appeared in London with Chet Baker and recorded the much acclaimed album All Blues.

In the early 1980s, she performed at numerous European festivals, and worked with groups led by Ack van Rooyen, Lou Blackburn, Ferdinand Povel, Bobby Burgess, Michel Herr, Tom Nicholas, Dieter Reith and Erwin Lehn.

In 1983 Gould sang for quite a while in the United States and, in New York City, with Woody Herman, Sal Nistico and Jake Hanna.

Upon her return to Germany, she presented at the Leverkusen Jazz festival the band "Breath & Bones". She continued her work in Germany from 1984 onwards, consisting mainly of teaching: first as a lecturer at the conservatories in Maastricht, Cologne, Mainz and Hamburg, before travelling in 1987 to the Swiss Jazz School. She later went on to work with Joe Haider and Benny Bailey.

She played with Riccardo Del Fra on the 1989 album "A Sip of Your Touch", and, with his band, on a live album at the Montreux Jazz Festival 1991.

Gould taught at numerous music institutions across Europe. Her teaching career included positions at the Music University in Cologne, the Conservatory in Maastricht, the Swiss Jazz School in Bern, and the experimental Modelversuch program in Hamburg. She also led courses at the International Jazz Clinics in Tübingen, the University of Mainz, the Remscheid Jazz Clinic, as well as many other jazz workshops. Since 1991, she has worked as a lecturer in jazz singing at the Royal Conservatory of The Hague (Koninklijk Conservatorium Den Haag).

== Discography ==
- Chet Baker & Rachel Gould All Blues (with Henri Florens, Jean Paul Florens, Jim Richardson, Tony Mann, 1979)
- The Dancer (with Dennis Luxion, Wilson de Oliveira, Rudi Schroeder, Clarence Becton released as LP 1982, as CD 1999)
- A Sip Of Your Touch (with Riccardo Del Fra, 1989)
- Live In Montreux (with Stephan Kurmann and Strings, 1991)
- More of Me (with Allan Praskin, Larry Porter, Thomas Stabenow, Clarence Becton 1993)
- Rachel Gould & Luigi Tessarollo Tribute to Hoagy Carmichael (with Riccardo Fioravanti, Giovanni Gullino, 2007)

== Festivals ==
- Leverkusen Jazz Festival
- Kempten Jazz Festival
- JIM Festival Munchen
- International Jazz Vocalists Meeting in Samoc (Poland)
- Jazz Rally Brussels (Belgium)
- Jazz Festivals in Clertmont-Ferrand, Grenoble and Avignon (France)
- Umbria Jazz Festival (Italy)
- Comblain-La-Tour Jazz Festival
- Heineken Jazz Festival (Netherlands)

== Literature ==
- Martin Kunzler Jazz-Lexikon. Band 1. Reinbek 2002; ISBN 3-499-16512-0
