= Crystal Bells =

Studio album by Chet Baker, Philip Catherine, Jean-Louis Rassinfosse
- Released: 1983
- Recorded: September 1983
- Studio: Igloostudio, Brussels, Belgium
- Genre: Jazz
- Length: 43:29
- Label: LDH; LDH 1009
- Producer: LDH-ASBL

Chet Baker chronology
Chet Baker Live in Sweden with Åke Johansson Trio (1983)	Crystal Bells (1983)	At Capolinea (1983)

Crystal Bells is an album by trumpeter Chet Baker guitarist Philip Catherine and bassist Jean-Louis Rassinfosse which was recorded in 1983 and first released on the Belgian LDH label.

== Reception ==
Professional ratings
Review scores
Source	Rating
Allmusic	4/5 stars

The Allmusic review by Matt Collar states "by the '80s Baker's improvisation had coalesced into a beautifully logical, root harmony-based style in which one can discern the exact progressions of any given tune simply by listening to him. Here, his lines connect, turn by turn, melody upon melody like a pastel jigsaw puzzle forming before your eyes. Subsequently, Baker thrived in the company of the like-minded Belgians, whose bop-inflected technical prowess on their instruments was also matched by their deft sense for melodicism and sympathetic group interplay. ... Ultimately, Crystal Bells is an absolutely magical session with inspired performances that still ring true so many years after Baker's passing.".

== Track listing ==
1. "Crystal Bells" (Charlie Mariano) – 6:19
2. "Strollin" (Horace Silver) – 7:26
3. "Lament" (J. J. Johnson) – 7:39
4. "Leaving" (Richie Beirach) – 9:44
5. "Cherokee" (Ray Noble) – 6:50
6. "Estate" (Bruno Martino) – 5:31

== Personnel ==
- Chet Baker – trumpet
- Philip Catherine – guitar
- Jean-Louis Rassinfosse – bass
