= The Touch of Your Lips (Pat Boone album) =

Studio album by Pat Boone
- Released: 1964
- Genre: Pop
- Label: Dot

Pat Boone chronology
Sing Along Without Pat Boone! (1964)	The Touch of Your Lips (1964)	Ain't That a Shame (1964)

Professional ratings
Review scores
Source	Rating
AllMusic	2/5 stars
Billboard	4/4 stars

The Touch of Your Lips is the 23rd studio album by Pat Boone, released in early 1964 on Dot Records.

== Track listing ==
Side one
No.	Title	Writer(s)	Length
1.	"The Touch of Your Lips"	Ray Noble	2:17
2.	"Warm All Over"	Frank Loesser	2:18
3.	"Long Ago (and Far Away)"	Jerome Kern, Ira Gershwin	2:05
4.	"Just One More Chance"	Arthur Johnston, Sam Coslow	2:55
5.	"Here's to My Lady"	Rube Bloom, Johnny Mercer	2:20
6.	"I Concentrate on You"	Cole Porter	3:28

Side two
No.	Title	Writer(s)	Length
1.	"Close"	Cole Porter	2:41
2.	"My Romance"	Rodgers and Hart	1:55
3.	"I Love You Much Too Much"	Alexander Olshanetsky, Don Raye, Chaim Towber	2:34
4.	"In the Heat of the Day"	Gordon Jenkins	2:59
5.	"Alone Together"	Arthur Schwartz, Howard Dietz	2:45
6.	"Mam'selle"	Mack Gordon, Edmund Goulding	2:41
