= Baker's Holiday =

Studio album by Chet Baker
- Released: 1965
- Recorded: May 1965
- Studio: NYC
- Genre: Jazz
- Length: 32:03
- Label: Limelight; LM-82019/LS-86019
- Producer: Luchi DeJesus

Chet Baker chronology
Stella by Starlight (1964)	Baker's Holiday (1965)	Smokin' with the Chet Baker Quintet (1965)

Baker's Holiday is an album of songs associated with Billie Holiday by trumpeter/vocalist Chet Baker which was recorded in 1965 and released on the Limelight label.

== Reception ==
Professional ratings
Review scores
Source	Rating
Allmusic	3/5 stars
The Penguin Guide to Jazz Recordings	3/4 stars
DownBeat	3/5 stars

The Allmusic review by Scott Yanow states: "His performance of ten songs associated with Lady Day (most of which he had not recorded previously) is often exquisite".

== Track listing ==
1. "Trav'lin' Light" (Trummy Young, Jimmy Mundy, Johnny Mercer) – 3:10
2. "Easy Living" (Ralph Rainger, Leo Robin) – 3:21
3. "That Ole Devil Called Love" (Allan Roberts, Doris Fisher) – 3:15
4. "You're My Thrill" (Jay Gorney, Sidney Clare) – 2:58
5. "Crazy She Calls Me" (Carl Sigman, Bob Russell) – 3:21
6. "When Your Lover Has Gone" (Einar Aaron Swan) – 2:52
7. "Mean to Me" (Fred E. Ahlert, Roy Turk) – 3:35
8. "These Foolish Things" (Jack Strachey, Holt Marvell, Harry Link) – 3:29
9. "There Is No Greater Love" (Isham Jones, Marty Symes) – 2:32
10. "Don't Explain" (Arthur Herzog Jr., Billie Holiday) – 3:30

== Personnel ==
- Chet Baker – flugelhorn, vocals on 1,2,6, 8, and 9
- Leon Cohen, Henry Freeman, Wilford Holcombe, Seldon Powell, Alan Ross – reeds
- Hank Jones – piano
- Everett Barksdale – guitar
- Richard Davis – bass
- Connie Kay – drums
- Jimmy Mundy – arranger
