= Comin' On with the Chet Baker Quintet =

Studio album by Chet Baker
- Released: 1967
- Recorded: August 23, 25 & 29, 1965; New York City
- Genre: Jazz
- Length: 42:09
- Label: Prestige; PR 7478
- Producer: Richard Carpenter

Chet Baker chronology
Groovin' with the Chet Baker Quintet (1965)	Comin' On with the Chet Baker Quintet (1967)	Cool Burnin' with the Chet Baker Quintet (1965)

Comin' On with the Chet Baker Quintet is an album by trumpeter Chet Baker which was recorded in 1965 and released on the Prestige label.

== Reception ==
Professional ratings
Review scores
Source	Rating
Allmusic	3/5 stars
The Penguin Guide to Jazz Recordings	3/4 stars

Allmusic rated the album as 3 stars.

== Track listing ==
All compositions by Richard Carpenter except where noted.

1. "Comin' On" – 5:40
2. "Stairway to the Stars" (Matty Malneck, Mitchell Parish, Frank Signorelli) – 4:44
3. "No Fair Lady" (Jimmy Mundy) – 8:15
4. "When You're Gone" (J. J. Johnson) – 4:08
5. "Choose Now" (Tadd Dameron) – 5:51
6. "Chabootie" – 6:57
7. "Carpsie's Groove" (Richard Carpenter, Sonny Stitt) – 6:34

== Personnel ==
- Chet Baker – flugelhorn
- George Coleman – tenor saxophone
- Kirk Lightsey – piano
- Herman Wright – bass
- Roy Brooks – drums
