= Ballads for Two =

Studio album by Chet Baker and Wolfgang Lackerschmid
- Released: 1979
- Recorded: January 8 & 9, 1979
- Studio: Tonstudio Zuckerfabrik, Stuttgart, West Germany
- Genre: Jazz
- Length: 37:18
- Label: Sandra Music Productions; SMP 2102
- Producer: Sandra Music Productions

Chet Baker chronology
Two a Day (1978)	Ballads for Two (1979)	The Touch of Your Lips (1979)

Ballads for Two is an album by trumpeter Chet Baker and vibraphonist Wolfgang Lackerschmid which was recorded in 1979 and first released on Lackerschmid's Sandra Music Productions label.

== Reception ==
Professional ratings
Review scores
Source	Rating
Allmusic	4.5/5 stars

The Allmusic review by Bob Rusch states "This was a record not so much of rhythm as of tonal coloring, pitch and reverberation. This was also an avant-garde Chet Baker, without gimmicks, just meeting an interest to expand and further develop: to invent, expand, create. This was also very beautiful creativity; art for art's sake. Wolfgang Lackerschmid played vibes in a manner owing itself more to Red Norvo and Gary Burton than Milt Jackson, and proved himself to be a creator and artist in his ebb and flow with the trumpeter. Bravos for both artists".

== Track listing ==
All compositions by Wolfgang Lackerschmid except where noted

1. "Blue Bossa" (Kenny Dorham) – 3:51
2. "Five Years Ago" – 3:49
3. "Why Shouldn't You Cry"- 4:44
4. "Dessert" (Wolfgang Lackerschmid, Chet Baker) – 6:58
5. "Softly, as in a Morning Sunrise" (Sigmund Romberg, Oscar Hammerstein II) – 6:10
6. "You Don't Know What Love Is" (Gene de Paul, Don Raye) – 7:53
7. "Waltz for Susan" – 3:53

== Personnel ==
- Chet Baker – trumpet
- Wolfgang Lackerschmid – vibraphone
