= W. Royal Stokes =

American writer, music journalist, and music historian (1930–2021)

W. Royal Stokes (né William Royal Stokes; 27 June 1930 – 1 May 2021 Elkins, West Virginia) was an American writer, music journalist, and music historian.

== Books ==
- The Jazz Scene: An Informal History From New Orleans to 1990. Oxford University Press. 1991. ISBN 978-0-19-505409-5 – via Internet Archive. LCCN 90-14208; ISBN 0-1950-8270-2, ISBN 978-0-1950-8270-8; OCLC 848061522 (all editions); Scribd 477510387.
- The Jazz Scene: An Informal History from New Orleans to 1990. Oxford University Press, 1991
- Swing Era New York: The Jazz Photographs of Charles Peterson (foreword by Stanley Dance). Temple University Press. 1994. ISBN 9781566394642 – via Internet Archive. LCCN 94-10200; ISBN 1-5663-9227-6; OCLC 1151330294 (all editions).
- Living the Jazz Life: Conversations with Forty Musicians about Their Careers in Jazz. Oxford University Press, 2000
- Growing Up With Jazz: Twenty-Four Musicians Talk About Their Lives and Careers. Oxford University Press, 2005
- The Essential W. Royal Stokes: Jazz, Blues, and Beyond. Hannah Books, 2020

== Bibliography ==
=== References ===
- Washington Post (The); Richards, Chris (February 24, 2021). "90-Year-Old Jazz Critic W. Royal Stokes Has a New Book Out Compiling a Long Life Spent Listening To – And Loving – Music". (online ed.). ISSN 2641-9599; ProQuest 2493270691 (US Newsstream database).
- Washington Post (The); Schudel, Matt (May 4, 2021). "W. Royal Stokes, Who Chronicled Washington Jazz Scene for the Post, Dies at 90: A Onetime Classics Professor, He Wrote Several Books About Jazz and Was a Radio DJ". (online ed.). ISSN 2641-9599; ProQuest 2521837991 (US Newsstream database).
