= In the Mood (album) =

Studio album by Chet Baker and the Mariachi Brass
- Released: 1966
- Recorded: 1966; Los Angeles, California
- Genre: Jazz
- Label: World Pacific
- Producer: Richard Bock

Chet Baker chronology
Into My Life (1966)	In the Mood (1966)	Albert's House (1969)

In the Mood is a studio album by jazz trumpeter Chet Baker and the Mariachi Brass recorded in 1966 and released on the World Pacific label.

Most of the songs were previously recorded by Glenn Miller from 1939 to 1942. The exception is the theme song from the television show The Dating Game, which began airing in 1965. This record was recorded shortly before Baker was injured by thugs, leaving him unable to play his instrument for a couple of years.

== Reception ==
Professional ratings
Review scores
Source	Rating
Allmusic	1/5 stars

Allmusic rated the album with 1 star, stating: "This LP, which has absolutely terrible arrangements of songs associated with Glenn Miller finds Baker halfheartedly playing some of the boring melodies."

The album was released in the U.S., Canada, France, Australia, and New Zealand.

== Track listing ==
1. "Sunrise Serenade" (Frankie Carle, Jack Lawrence) - 2:15
2. "At Last" (Mack Gordon, Harry Warren) - 2:35
3. "Chattanooga Choo Choo" (Gordon, Warren) - 2:42
4. "Serenade In Blue" (Gordon, Warren) - 2:27
5. "In the Mood" (Wingy Manone, Andy Razaf, Joe Garland) - 2:45
6. "(I've Got a Gal In) Kalamazoo" (Gordon, Warren) - 2:30
7. "Little Brown Jug" (Joseph Winner) - 1:49
8. "Tuxedo Junction" (Erskine Hawkins, Bill Johnson, Julian Dash) - 2:38
9. "String of Pearls" (Jerry Gray, Eddie DeLange) - 2:45
10. "Moonlight Serenade" (Glenn Miller, Mitchell Parish) - 2:36
11. "Pennsylvania 6-5000" (Carl Sigman, Gray) - 1:55
12. "The Dating Game" (Chuck Barris, David Mook) - 2:10

== Personnel ==
- Chet Baker - flugelhorn
- The Mariachi Brass
- George Tipton - arranger, conductor
