= Dorothy Ashby =

American jazz harpist and composer (1932–1986)

Background information
- Born: Dorothy Jeanne Thompson; August 6, 1932; Detroit, Michigan, U.S.
- Died: April 13, 1986 (aged 53) Santa Monica, California, U.S.
- Education: Cass Technical High School; Wayne State University
- Genre: Jazz
- Occupation: Musician
- Instruments: Harp, piano, vocals, koto

Dorothy Jeanne Thompson (August 6, 1932 – April 13, 1986), better known as Dorothy Ashby, was an American jazz harpist, singer and composer. Hailed as one of the most "unjustly under loved jazz greats of the 1950s" and the "most accomplished modern jazz harpist", Ashby established the harp as an improvising jazz instrument, beyond earlier use as a novelty or background orchestral instrument, proving the harp could play bebop as adeptly as the instruments commonly associated with jazz, such as the saxophone or piano.

Ashby had to overcome many obstacles during the pursuit of her career. As an African-American female musician in a male-dominated industry, she was at a disadvantage. In a 1983 interview with W. Royal Stokes for his book Living the Jazz Life, she remarked of her career: "It's been maybe a triple burden in that not a lot of women are becoming known as jazz players. There is also the connection with Black women. The audiences I was trying to reach were not interested in the harp, period—classical or otherwise—and they were certainly not interested in seeing a Black woman playing the harp." Ashby successfully navigated these disadvantages, and subsequently aided in the expansion of who was listening to harp music and what the harp was deemed capable of producing as an instrument.

Ashby's albums were of the jazz genre, but often moved into R&B, world music, and other styles, especially her 1970 album The Rubaiyat of Dorothy Ashby, where she demonstrates her talents on another instrument, the Japanese koto, successfully integrating it into jazz.

== Early life and education ==
Ashby was born Dorothy Jeanne Thompson and grew up in the Paradise Valley/Black Bottom Community in Detroit, Michigan, where her father, Wiley Thompson, a self-taught jazz guitarist, often brought home fellow jazz musicians. Even as a young girl, Dorothy would provide support and background to their music by playing the piano.

She attended Cass Technical High School, where fellow students included such future musical talents and jazz greats as Donald Byrd, Gerald Wilson, and Kenny Burrell. While in high school, she tried her hand at a number of instruments including the saxophone and string bass before, influenced by her father and piano teacher, coming upon the harp. Instructed by Velma Froude, Ashby learned the strict classical style of harp playing influenced by French harpist Carlos Salzedo.

Aged 17, Ashby continued her music studies at Wayne State University in Detroit, where she majored in piano and music education.

== Career ==
After she graduated, she began playing the piano in the jazz scene in Detroit, though by 1952 she had made the harp her main instrument. At first, her fellow jazz musicians were resistant to the idea of adding the harp, which they perceived as an instrument of classical music and somewhat ethereal in sound in jazz performances. Ashby overcame their initial resistance and built support for the harp as a jazz instrument by organizing free shows and playing at dances and weddings with her trio. She recorded with Jimmy Cobb, Ed Thigpen, Richard Davis, Frank Wess and others in the late 1950s and early 1960s. During the 1960s, she also had her own radio show in Detroit where she would occasionally perform live shows with her husband, and talk.

Ashby partially contributed to the spread of unstereotypical music education in Detroit during 1967. Robert H. Klotman, a divisional director of music education was inspired by her and Cass Technical Highschool's harp and vocal ensemble, placing 10 Troubadour harps in five inner-city schools.

Ashby's trio, including her husband, John Ashby, on drums, regularly toured the country, recording albums for several record labels. She played with Louis Armstrong and Woody Herman, among others. In 1962, Ashby won DownBeat magazine's critics' and readers' awards for best jazz performers.

Her first full jazz LP, The Jazz Harpist, was recorded for Savoy in 1957, with Frank Wess on flute, Eddie Jones and Wendell Marshall on bass and Ed Thigpen on drums. The album was a mix of standards, such as "Thou Swell" and "Stella by Starlight", and Ashby's originals. It was critically well received, but the record-buying public ignored it. Her next album, Hip Harp (1958), on Prestige, featured Frank Wess on flute, Herman Wright on bass, and Art Taylor on drums. In all, Dorothy led 10 sessions between 1957 and 1970 for Atlantic, Cadet and many other labels. She was fearless in her musical choices as she played not just bop, but soul, Brazilian, African, Middle Eastern and like her contemporary (and other great jazz harpist) Alice Coltrane, free jazz. Ashby pioneered the use of the Japanese koto in jazz on her 1970 album The Rubaiyat of Dorothy Ashby, which was somewhat maligned in its time, but has become appreciated as an iconoclastic marriage of soul, world music and free jazz.

=== The Ashby Players and theatre work ===
In the 1960s, Ashby, together with her husband, formed a theatrical group to produce plays that would be relevant to the African-American community of Detroit. This production group went by several names depending on the theater production.

They created a series of theatrical musical plays that Dorothy and John Ashby produced together as this theatrical company, the Ashby Players of Detroit. In the case of most of the plays, John Ashby wrote the scripts and Ashby wrote the scores. Ashby also played harp and piano on the soundtracks to all of her plays. She starred in the production of the play 3–6–9 herself. Most of the music that she wrote for these plays is available only on a handful of the reel-to-reel tapes that Ashby recorded herself. Only a couple of the many songs she created for her plays later appeared on LPs that she released. Later in her career, she would make recordings and perform at concerts primarily to raise money for the Ashby Players theatrical productions.

The theatrical production group The Ashby Players not only produced black theater in Detroit and Canada but provided early theatrical and acting opportunities for black actors. Ernie Hudson (of Ghostbusters, credited as Earnest L. Hudson) was a featured actor in the Artists Productions version of the play 3–6–9. In the late 1960s, the Ashbys gave up touring and settled in California, where Dorothy broke into the studio recording system as a harpist through the help of the soul singer Bill Withers, who recommended her to Stevie Wonder. As a result, she was called upon for a number of studio sessions, playing for more pop-oriented acts.

== Death ==
Ashby died aged 53 from cancer on April 13, 1986, in her home located in Santa Monica, California. Her body was cremated, and her ashes were scattered over Santa Monica Bay after a memorial service.

== Influence ==
In the 1990s, Pete Rock, Rahzel and Ugly Duckling sampled Ashby's harp music for their own works.

Throughout the 2000s and 2010s, multiple high-profile artists continued to sample Ashby's work, including Jay-Z, Mac Miller, J Dilla, Madlib, and many more.

In 2018, Drake included a sample of Ashby's rendition of "The Windmills of Your Mind" in his song "Final Fantasy" from the album Scorpion.

== Discography ==
=== As leader ===
- 1957: The Jazz Harpist (Regent) – with Frank Wess
- 1958: Hip Harp (Prestige) – with Frank Wess
- 1958: In a Minor Groove (New Jazz) – with Frank Wess
- 1961: Soft Winds (Jazzland)
- 1962: Dorothy Ashby (Argo)
- 1965: The Fantastic Jazz Harp of Dorothy Ashby (Atlantic)
- 1966: The Sounds of Christmas (Tab) – with Jimmy Clark and Tom Montgomery
- 1968: Afro-Harping (Cadet)
- 1969: Dorothy's Harp (Cadet)
- 1970: The Rubaiyat of Dorothy Ashby (Cadet)
- 1984: Django/Misty (Philips)
- 1984: Concierto de Aranjuez (Philips)

=== As sidewoman ===
With Bill Withers

- +'Justments (Columbia, 1974)

With Bobbi Humphrey

- Fancy Dancer (Blue Note, 1975)

With Minnie Riperton

- Adventures in Paradise (Epic, 1975)

With Wade Marcus

- Metamorphosis (ABC/Impulse!, 1976)

With Stanley Turrentine

- Everybody Come On Out (Fantasy, 1976)

With Stevie Wonder

- Songs in the Key of Life (Motown, 1976)

With Sonny Criss

- Warm & Sonny (Impulse!, 1977)

With Gene Harris

- Tone Tantrum (Blue Note, 1977)

With Freddie Hubbard

- Bundle of Joy (Columbia, 1977)

With Billy Preston

- Late at Night (Motown, 1979)

With Bobby Womack

- The Poet (Beverly Glenn, 1981)
- The Poet II (Beverly Glenn, 1984)

With Osamu Kitajima

- The Source (1984)

== See also ==
- Brandee Younger
- Alice Coltrane
