= A Taste of Tequila =

Studio album by Chet Baker and the Mariachi Brass
- Released: 1966
- Recorded: December 1965; Los Angeles, California
- Genre: Jazz
- Length: 24:38
- Label: World Pacific; WP 1839
- Producer: Richard Bock

Chet Baker chronology
Boppin' with the Chet Baker Quintet (1965)	A Taste of Tequila (1966)	Hats Off (1966)

A Taste of Tequila is an album by jazz trumpeter Chet Baker and the Mariachi Brass recorded in 1965 and released on the World Pacific label.

== Reception ==
Professional ratings
Review scores
Source	Rating
Allmusic	1.5/5 stars

Scott Yanow of Allmusic states, "During 1965-1966, he cut six remarkably commercial throwaways for the once viable World Pacific label. A Taste of Tequila was the first, featuring Baker's unenthusiastic solos on ten poppish tunes while joined by the Mariachi Brass, a rather weak derivative of the Tijuana Brass".

== Track listing ==
1. "Flowers on the Wall" (Lew DeWitt) - 2:19
2. "Tequila" (Chuck Rio) - 2:06
3. "Mexico" (Boudleaux Bryant) - 2:14
4. "Cuando Calienta el Sol" (Rafael Gaston Perez) - 2:44
5. "Hot Toddy" (Ralph Flanagan, Herb Hendler) - 2:12
6. "Twenty Four Hours from Tulsa" (Burt Bacharach, Hal David) - 3:10
7. "Speedy Gonzales" (Buddy Kaye, Ethel Lee, David Hess) - 2:36
8. "Come a Little Bit Closer" (Tommy Boyce, Bobby Hart, Wes Farrell) - 2:52
9. "El Paso" (Marty Robbins) - 3:10
10. "La Bamba" (Traditional) - 2:15

== Personnel ==
- Chet Baker - flugelhorn
- Tony Terran - trumpet
- The Mariachi Brass (at least):

- Marcus Cabuto
- Jerry Williams

- Jack Nitzsche - arranger, conductor
