= Cool Burnin' with the Chet Baker Quintet =

Studio album by Chet Baker
- Released: 1967
- Recorded: August 23, 25 & 29, 1965; New York City
- Genre: Jazz
- Length: 42:35
- Label: Prestige; PR 7496
- Producer: Richard Carpenter

Chet Baker chronology
Comin' On with the Chet Baker Quintet (1965)	Cool Burnin' with the Chet Baker Quintet (1967)	Boppin' with the Chet Baker Quintet (1965)

Cool Burnin' with the Chet Baker Quintet is an album by trumpeter Chet Baker which was recorded in 1965 and released on the Prestige label.

== Reception ==
Professional ratings
Review scores
Source	Rating
Allmusic	3/5 stars
The Penguin Guide to Jazz Recordings	3/4 stars

Allmusic rated the album with 3 stars.

== Track listing ==
All compositions by Richard Carpenter and Gladys Bruce except where noted.

1. "Hurry" – 4:53
2. "I Waited for You" (Gil Fuller, Dizzy Gillespie) – 6:33
3. "The 490" (Tadd Dameron) – 6:10
4. "Cut Plug" (Richard Carpenter, Sonny Stitt) – 4:39
5. "Boudoir" – 6:23
6. "Etude in 3" – 5:12
7. "Sleeping Susan" (Jimmy Mundy) – 8:45

== Personnel ==
- Chet Baker – flugelhorn
- George Coleman – tenor saxophone
- Kirk Lightsey – piano
- Herman Wright – bass
- Roy Brooks – drums
