= Smokin' with the Chet Baker Quintet =

Studio album by Chet Baker
- Released: 1965
- Recorded: August 23, 25 & 29, 1965; New York City
- Genre: Jazz
- Length: 38:45
- Label: Prestige; PR 7449
- Producer: Richard Carpenter

Chet Baker chronology
Baker's Holiday (1965)	Smokin' with the Chet Baker Quintet (1965)	Groovin' with the Chet Baker Quintet (1965)

Smokin' with the Chet Baker Quintet is an album by trumpeter Chet Baker which was recorded in 1965 and released on the Prestige label.

== Reception ==
Professional ratings
Review scores
Source	Rating
Allmusic	3/5 stars

Scott Yanow of Allmusic states, "these sessions let one know he could break through his "cool" image by playing heated bop when he wanted to. It also finds him debuting on fluegelhorn and the softer tone of the horn fit his introverted sound well".

== Track listing ==
1. "Grade "A" Gravy" (Richard Carpenter, Gladys Bruce) - 6:27
2. "Serenity" (Carpenter, Bruce) - 5:21
3. "Fine and Dandy" (Isham Jones, Kay Swift) - 7:23
4. "Have You Met Miss Jones?" (Lorenz Hart, Richard Rodgers) - 6:38
5. "Rearin' Back" (Carpenter, Sonny Stitt) - 6:04
6. "So Easy" (Tadd Dameron) - 6:52

== Personnel ==
- Chet Baker - flugelhorn
- George Coleman - tenor saxophone
- Kirk Lightsey - piano
- Herman Wright - bass
- Roy Brooks - drums
