= Groovin' with the Chet Baker Quintet =

Studio album by Chet Baker
- Released: 1966
- Recorded: August 23, 25 & 29, 1965; New York City
- Genre: Jazz
- Length: 39:23
- Label: Prestige; PR 7460
- Producer: Richard Carpenter

Chet Baker chronology
Smokin' with the Chet Baker Quintet (1965)	Groovin' with the Chet Baker Quintet (1966)	Comin' On with the Chet Baker Quintet (1965)

Groovin' with the Chet Baker Quintet is an album by trumpeter Chet Baker which was recorded in 1965 and released on the Prestige label.

== Reception ==
Professional ratings
Review scores
Source	Rating
Allmusic	3/5 stars
The Penguin Guide to Jazz Recordings	3/4 stars

Allmusic rated the album with 3 stars.

== Track listing ==
All compositions by Richard Carpenter and Gladys Bruce except as indicated

1. "Madison Avenue" - 5:51
2. "Lonely Star" - 7:49
3. "Wee, Too" - 7:37
4. "Tan Gaugin" - 6:16
5. "Cherokee" (Ray Noble) - 6:45
6. "Bevan Beeps" (Tadd Dameron) - 5:05

== Personnel ==
- Chet Baker - flugelhorn
- George Coleman - tenor saxophone
- Kirk Lightsey - piano
- Herman Wright - bass
- Roy Brooks - drums
