= Hats Off (Chet Baker album) =

Studio album by Chet Baker and the Mariachi Brass
- Released: 1966
- Recorded: April 1966; Los Angeles, California
- Genre: Jazz
- Label: World Pacific; WP 1842
- Producer: Richard Bock

Chet Baker chronology
A Taste of Tequila (1965)	Hats Off (1966)	Quietly There (1966)

Hats Off is an album by jazz trumpeter Chet Baker and the Mariachi Brass recorded in 1966 and released on the World Pacific label.

== Reception ==
Professional ratings
Review scores
Source	Rating
Allmusic	3/5 stars

Allmusic rated the album with 3 stars.

== Track listing ==
1. "Happiness Is" (Paul Evans, Paul Parnes) - 1:57
2. "Sure Gonna Miss Her" (Bobby Russell) - 2:29
3. "Bang Bang (My Baby Shot Me Down)" (Sonny Bono) - 2:40
4. "The Phoenix Love Theme (Senza Fine)" (Gino Paoli, Norman Newell) - 2:43
5. "These Boots Are Made for Walkin'" (Lee Hazlewood) - 2:54
6. "On the Street Where You Live" (Alan Jay Lerner, Frederick Loewe) - 2:04
7. "Armen's Theme" (Ross Bagdasarian, Sr.) - 2:32
8. "Spanish Harlem" (Jerry Leiber, Phil Spector) - 2:23
9. "Chiquita Banana" (Garth Montgomery, Len MacKenzie, William Wirges) - 1:55
10. "When the Day Is All Done (Foy O)" (A. Tracy, P. Tracy, W. Holt) - 2:15
11. "You Baby" (P. F. Sloan, Steve Barri) - 2:38
12. "It's Too Late" (Bobby Goldsboro) - 2:38

== Personnel ==
- Chet Baker - flugelhorn
- Tony Terran - trumpet
- The Mariachi Brass
- Jack Nitzsche (tracks 5, 9 & 11), George Tipton (tracks 1–4, 6–8, 10 & 12) - arranger, conductor
