= Quietly There =

Studio album by Chet Baker and the Carmel Strings
- Released: 1966
- Recorded: June 1966; Los Angeles, California
- Genre: Jazz
- Label: World Pacific; WP 1847
- Producer: Richard Bock

Chet Baker chronology
Hats Off (1966)	Quietly There (1966)	Double-Shot (1966)

Quietly There is an album by jazz trumpeter Chet Baker and the Carmel Strings recorded in 1966 and released on the World Pacific label.

== Reception ==
Professional ratings
Review scores
Source	Rating
Allmusic	3/5 stars

Allmusic rated the album with 3 stars.

== Track listing ==
1. "Early Autumn" (Ralph Burns, Woody Herman, Johnny Mercer) - 2:43
2. "I Left My Heart in San Francisco" (George Cory, Douglass Cross) - 2:29
3. "Forget Him" (Tony Hatch) - 2:41
4. "The Christmas Song" (Mel Tormé, Bob Wells) - 3:05
5. "Quietly There" (Johnny Mandel, Morgan Ames) - 2:38
6. "Spring Can Really Hang You Up the Most" (Fran Landesman, Tommy Wolf) - 2:52
7. "Stranger on the Shore" (Acker Bilk) - 2:39
8. "You Don't Have to Say You Love Me" (Pino Donaggio, Vito Pallavicini, Vicki Wickham, Simon Napier-Bell) - 2:35
9. "The More I See You" (Harry Warren, Mack Gordon) - 2:48
10. "No More Blues (Chega de Saudade)" (Antônio Carlos Jobim, Vinícius de Moraes) - 2:24
11. "Message to Michael" (Burt Bacharach, Hal David) - 2:42
12. "(You're My) Soul and Inspiration" (Barry Mann, Cynthia Weil) - 2:38

== Personnel ==
- Chet Baker - flugelhorn
- The Carmel Strings
- Harry Betts, Julian Lee - arranger, conductor
