= Double-Shot =

Studio album by Chet Baker and the Mariachi Brass
- Released: 1966
- Recorded: June 1966; Los Angeles, California
- Genre: Jazz
- Label: World Pacific
- Producer: Richard Bock

Chet Baker chronology
Quietly There (1966)	Double-Shot (1966)	Into My Life (1966)

Double-Shot is a studio album by jazz trumpeter Chet Baker and the Mariachi Brass recorded in 1966 and released on the World Pacific label.

== Reception ==
Professional ratings
Review scores
Source	Rating
Allmusic	2/5 stars

Allmusic rated the album with 2 stars.

== Track listing ==
1. "Dancing in the Street" (Marvin Gaye, William "Mickey" Stevenson, Ivy Jo Hunter) – 2:18
2. "Ring of Fire" (June Carter, Merle Kilgore) – 2:10
3. "Yesterday's Gone" (Chad Stuart, Wendy Kidd) – 2:29
4. "Danke Schoen" (Bert Kaempfert, Kurt Schwabach, Milt Gabler) – 2:12
5. "The Blue Dove" (Farlan Myer, Hal Levy) – 2:17
6. "Red Rubber Ball" (Paul Simon, Bruce Woodley) – 2:22
7. "When You're Smiling" (Larry Shay, Mark Fisher, Joe Goodwin) – 1:50
8. "Enamorado" (Keith Colley, Paul Rubio) – 1:59
9. "Agua Caliente" (Mike Miller, George Freeborn) – 2:30
10. "Wheels" (Richard Stephens, Jimmy Torres, Norman Petty) – 2:05
11. "But Not Today" (Buddy Scott, Jimmy Radcliffe, Bert Kaempfert) – 2:37
12. "Green Grass" (Roger Greenaway, Roger Cook) – 2:10

== Personnel ==
- Chet Baker – flugelhorn
- The Mariachi Brass
- George Tipton – arranger, conductor
