= Albert's House =

Studio album by Chet Baker
- Released: 1969
- Recorded: 1969; Los Angeles, California
- Genre: Jazz
- Length: 45:45
- Label: Beverly Hills
- Producer: Meadowlane Enterprises Inc.

Chet Baker chronology
In the Mood (1966)	Albert's House (1969)	Blood, Chet and Tears (1970)

Albert's House is a studio album by jazz trumpeter Chet Baker recorded in 1969 and released on the Beverly Hills label. The album features 11 compositions by Steve Allen who organized the recording date to assist Baker in restarting his career after a horrific injury wrecked his embouchure.

== Reception ==
Professional ratings
Review scores
Source	Rating
Allmusic	1/5 stars
The Rolling Stone Jazz Record Guide	3/5 stars

Scott Yanow of Allmusic states, "In 1968 Baker had his teeth knocked out by a group of thugs. In 1969 he recorded this remarkably bad set of music... Baker, who sounds as if he is struggling to get any air at all out of his horn, rarely ventures out of the lower register or away from the themes. He sounds in sad shape, so why does this music repeatedly get reissued?"

== Track listing ==
All compositions by Steve Allen except as indicated

1. "Albert's House" – 2:34
2. "Farewell, San Francisco" – 5:01
3. "Time" – 4:42
4. "I Should Have Told You So" – 4:39
5. "How Dare You, Sir" – 4:39
6. "End of the Line" – 3:32
7. "Sunday in Town" – 4:56
8. "A Man Who Used to Be" (John H. Fitch, Jr.) – 3:31
9. "Never Had This Feeling Before" – 3:39
10. "Life" – 4:25
11. "Nice Little Girls" – 4:07

== Personnel ==
- Chet Baker – trumpet, vocals
- Paul Smith – piano, organ
- Barney Kessel – guitar
- Jim Hughart – bass
- Frank Capp – drums
