= Wolfgang Lackerschmid =

German jazz musician

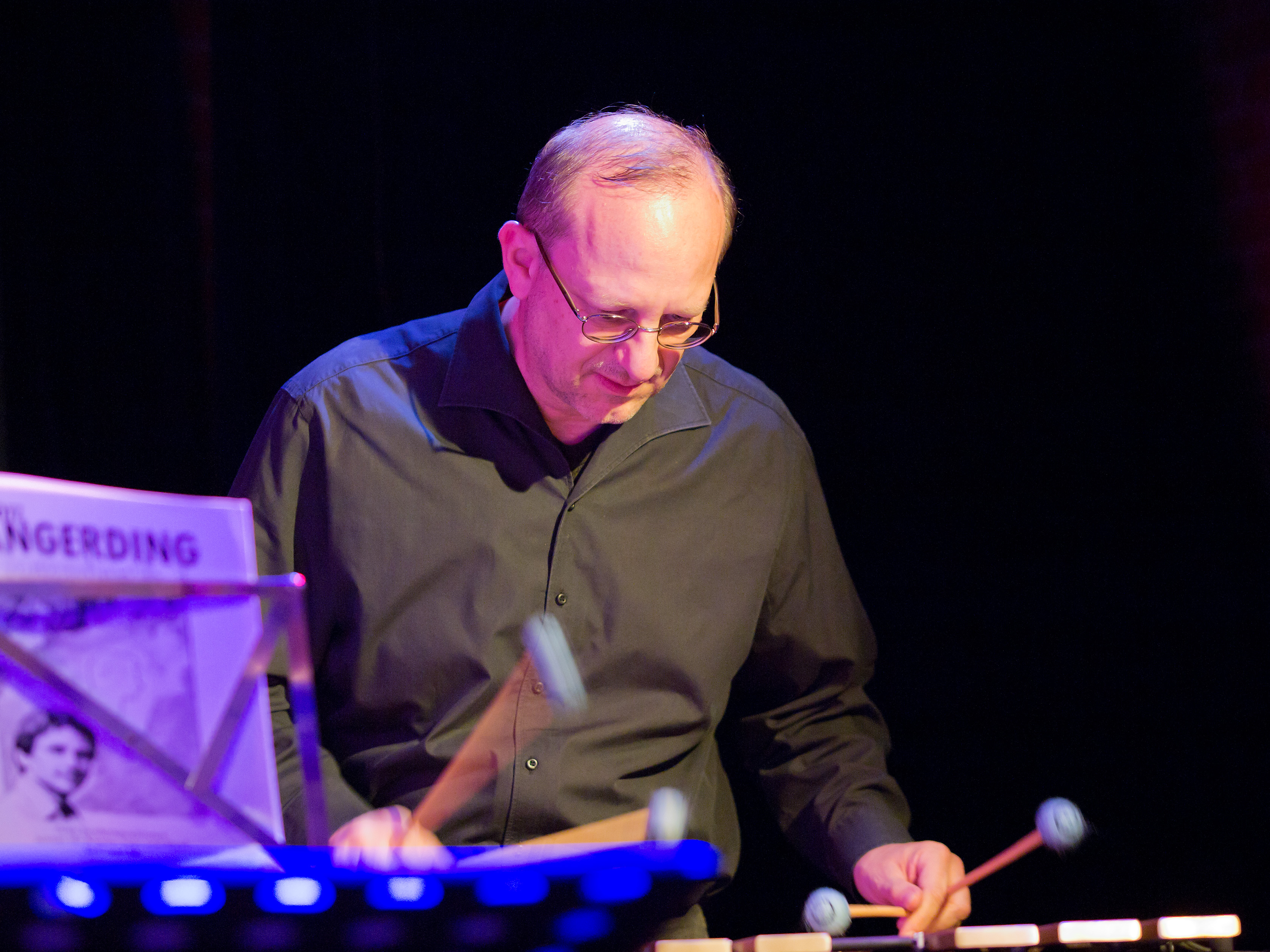
Wolfgang Lackerschmid in 2011

Wolfgang Lackerschmid (born 19 September 1956 in Tegernsee) is a German jazz musician, bandleader and composer. His main instrument is the vibraphone, but he also plays many other percussion instruments. Lackerschmid grew up in Ehingen and now lives in Augsburg, where he operates a recording studio.

== Biography ==
Lackerschmid grew up in Ehingen/Donau. From 1975 to 1980 he studied composition and music theory with Martin Gümbel and percussion with Gyula Rasz at the Stuttgart University of Music and Performing Arts.

In 1976 Lackerschmid founded his Mallet Connection, with which he recorded the LP of the same name in the same year. On this LP he worked with artists like Rocky Knauer, Gerhart Ziegler, Janusz Stefanski, Dieter Bihlmaier, Leszek Żądło and Herbert Joos. In 1978, Joachim-Ernst Berendt brought him to the first Vibraphone Summit together with Karl Berger, David Friedman and Tom van der Geld.

Through these engagements and collaborations, Lackerschmid gained increasing fame in the European jazz scene. In January 1979 came the lastingly important collaboration with trumpeter Chet Baker. When the two met at a festival, Lackerschmid suggested Baker to record a duo album. Enthusiastic about the idea, the two found themselves in the studio in Stuttgart a few months later and recorded the LP Ballads for Two, followed by Chet Baker / Wolfgang Lackerschmid, with Larry Coryell, Buster Williams, and Tony Williams.

Lackerschmid concentrated more on his record company Sandra Musik in the early 1980s, and in 1988 received his first major commission from a theater stage. He wrote the ballet music for Snow White at the Augsburg City Theater.

After moving to Augsburg, Lackerschmid became involved in more projects. He wrote commissioned works for the Augsburg Theater (Faust, Peer Gynt) and the Augsburger Puppenkiste (Paula and the Box Goblins, A Midsummer Night's Dream). He also set to music poetry by the famous Augsburg writer Bertolt Brecht and the Bäsle letters by W.A. Mozart and dedicated the composition Stone Sound, History of a City to the city.

Since about 1980 he has also been touring outside of Europe, mainly in the United States of America. Alongside Chet Baker, Attilla Zoller is one of his most important companions.

According to discographer Tom Lord, he was involved in 48 recording sessions between 1976 and 2016. He lives in Augsburg, where he also runs a recording studio. Since 2016 he has been a member of the national board of the German Jazz Union (formerly the Union of German Jazz Musicians).

== Discography ==
=== As leader ===
- Mallet Connection (Plane, 1978)
- Ballads for Two (Sandra, 1979)
- Chet Baker / Wolfgang Lackerschmid (Sandra, 1980)
- Live Conversation (In-akustik, 1985)
- Originals (Art & Sound, 1988)
- Live Highlights '92 with Attila Zoller (Bhakti, 1992)
- One More Life (Bhakti, 1992)
- Gently but Deep (Bhakti, 1996)
- Colors (Hot Wire, 1997)
- Hurry Up and Wait (Hipjazz, 2007)
- Common Language, Common Sense (Hipjazz, 2011)
- Magic Brewery (Hipjazz, 2013)
- Wolfgang Lackerschmid Quartet (TCB, 2015)
- Samba Gostoso (Hipjazz, 2016)
- Studio Konzert (Neuklang, 2018)
