= Blood, Chet and Tears =

Studio album by Chet Baker
- Released: 1970
- Recorded: July 6, 1970
- Studio: Sunwest Recording Studios, Hollywood, California
- Genre: Jazz
- Label: Verve
- Producer: Jerry Styner

Chet Baker chronology
Albert's House (1969)	Blood, Chet and Tears (1970)	In Concert (1974)

Blood, Chet and Tears is a studio album by jazz trumpeter Chet Baker recorded in 1970 and released on the Verve label.

== Reception ==
Professional ratings
Review scores
Source	Rating
Allmusic	1.5/5 stars

Allmusic rated the album with 1½ stars stating "Blood, Chet & Tears is legendary for being one of the most shameful releases in his catalog, but the reality of the album isn't quite as bad as the legend behind it... Blood, Chet & Tears finds Baker trying to sound like somebody else and that's the worst thing about the album. It literally sounds like Baker is hiding his true musical personality rather than expanding upon that personality. And when you come right down to it, that really is selling out as opposed to what George Benson and others were doing during this same period".

== Track listing ==
1. "Easy Come, Easy Go" (Jack Keller, Diane Hildebrand) – 2:51
2. "Sugar, Sugar" (Jeff Barry, Andy Kim) – 2:52
3. "Something" (George Harrison) – 3:20
4. "Spinning Wheel" (David Clayton-Thomas) – 3:16
5. "Vehicle" (Jim Peterik) – 2:44
6. "The Letter" (Wayne Carson Thompson) – 3:34
7. "And When I Die" (Laura Nyro) – 2:57
8. "Come Saturday Morning" (Fred Karlin, Dory Previn) – 2:48
9. "Evil Ways" (Clarence "Sonny" Henry) – 3:35
10. "You've Made Me So Very Happy" (Brenda Holloway, Patrice Holloway, Frank Wilson, Berry Gordy) – 3:40

== Personnel ==
- Chet Baker – trumpet, vocals
- Tony Terran, Ray Triscari, Ollie Mitchell – trumpet
- Miles Anderson, Dick Hyde, – trombone
- George Roberts – bass trombone
- Plas Johnson – tenor saxophone
- Buddy Collette – reeds
- Larry Knechtel – keyboards
- Al Casey, Mike Deasy, Joe Pass, Tommy Tedesco – guitar
- Joe Osborn, Ray Pohlman – electric bass
- Hal Blaine – drums
- Gary Coleman – percussion
- The Sid Sharp Strings arranged and conducted by Jerry Styner
