= Jeff Brillinger =

- Born: July 12, 1947 (age 78) Kingston, New York, U.S.
- Genres: Jazz
- Occupation: jazz musician
- Instrument: Drums

Jeffrey Paul Brillinger is an American jazz musician and drummer.

Brillinger was born in Kingston, New York on July 12, 1947 to parents Emily (Hosley) and Joseph Brillinger Sr. He and his brother Joseph Brillinger Jr. were raised in Sherburne, New York. He has one half-sister, Anne Hall Levine, and was predeceased by half-siblings Richard Henry Levine and Elena Esther Levine Smith.

Brillinger credits Anthony (Tony) Monforte, with whom he studied as a boy in Binghamton, New York at the Monforte School of Modern Drumming, with having tremendous and lasting influence on his musicianship.

In 1964, Brillinger moved to Boston to attend the Berklee College of Music and made his first recording with the student ensemble (Jazz in the Classroom, Volume XII). During this time he also performed with Clark Terry, Zoot Sims, Bob Brookmeyer, Mel Tormé, and Mose Allison. In 1974/75 Brillinger toured and recorded with Woody Herman and His Orchestra (Herd at Montreux, 1974)

In the following years, he worked, toured, and recorded with such Jazz musicians as Chet Baker (Broken Wing, 1978, Live at Nick's, 1987, Two a Day, 1979), Stan Getz (Jazzbühne Berlin '78, Ravens Wood), Horace Silver, Chris Connor, Gunther Schuller, Jackie Cain, Roy Kral, and Jack McDuff. From the 1990s on, he worked with Hod O'Brien, John Patitucci, Jed Levy, Ken Peplowski, Tom Harrell, Ron McClure, Andy Laverne (The Spirit of '76, 1992), Roger Rosenberg, Joel Weiskopf (New Beginning, 2001), and Cecilia Coleman (Oh Boy!, 2011).
