= Boppin' with the Chet Baker Quintet =

Studio album by Chet Baker
- Released: 1967
- Recorded: August 23, 25 & 29, 1965; New York City
- Genre: Jazz
- Label: Prestige; PR 7512
- Producer: Richard Carpenter

Chet Baker chronology
Cool Burnin' with the Chet Baker Quintet (1965)	Boppin' with the Chet Baker Quintet (1967)	A Taste of Tequila (1965)

Boppin' with the Chet Baker Quintet is an album by trumpeter Chet Baker which was recorded in 1965 and released on the Prestige label.

== Reception ==
Professional ratings
Review scores
Source	Rating
Allmusic	3/5 stars
The Penguin Guide to Jazz Recordings	3/4 stars

Allmusic rated the album as 3 stars.

== Track listing ==
All compositions by Richard Carpenter except where noted.

1. "Go-Go" – 4:32
2. "Lament for the Living" (Tadd Dameron) – 7:00
3. "Pot Luck" – 8:14
4. "Bud's Blues" (Sonny Stitt) – 6:17
5. "Romas" (Dameron) – 6:52
6. "On a Misty Night" (Dameron) – 7:33

== Personnel ==
- Chet Baker – flugelhorn
- George Coleman – tenor saxophone
- Kirk Lightsey – piano
- Herman Wright – bass
- Roy Brooks – drums
