= All Blues (Rachel Gould and Chet Baker album) =

Studio album by Rachel Gould and Chet Baker
- Released: 1979
- Recorded: September 5, 1979
- Studio: John Melner Studio, London, England
- Genre: Jazz
- Length: 36:20
- Label: Bingow; BGW 3103
- Producer: Philippe Gaviglio

Chet Baker chronology
Rendez-Vous (1979)	All Blues (1979)	No Problem (1979)

All Blues is an album by vocalist Rachel Gould and trumpeter Chet Baker which was recorded in 1979 and released on the French Bingow label.

Professional ratings
Review scores
Source	Rating
Allmusic	3/5 stars

== Track listing ==
1. "All Blues" (Miles Davis) – 5:31
2. "My Funny Valentine" (Richard Rodgers, Lorenz Hart) – 5:36
3. "Baubles, Bangles, & Beads" (Robert Wright, George Forrest) – 6:52
4. "Straight" (Thelonious Monk) – 3:51
5. "Round Midnight" (Monk, Cootie Williams, Bernie Hanighen) – 5:05
6. "I've Got You Under My Skin" (Cole Porter) – 4:57
7. "Phil's Bossa" (Jean Paul Florens) – 5:30

== Personnel ==
- Rachel Gould – vocals
- Chet Baker – trumpet
- Henry Florens – piano
- Jean Paul Florens – guitar
- Jim Richardson – bass
- Tony Mann – drums
