= Kraina FM =

Ukrainian language radio station

Kraina FM / Країна ФМ
- Type: Radio network and website
- Country: Ukraine
- Availability: International
- Owner: RadioCorp
- Key people: Roman Davydov (Head of Service)
- Launch date: 9 November 2016
- Webcast: http://185.65.245.34:8000/kiev
- Official website: krainafm.com.ua Kraina FM on Facebook

Kraina FM (Ukrainian: Країна ФМ) — Ukraine's first all-Ukrainian-language radio, broadcast in 26 cities in Ukraine and online prior to the Russian invasion of Ukraine in February 2022. It appeared from «Radio EU» November 9, 2016. Oleh Skrypka works as one of radio broadcasters.

In late February 2022, following the Russian invasion of Ukraine and the bombing of its broadcast tower in Kyiv, Kraina FM re-launched from an undisclosed location through remaining radio broadcast towers and online at as "The Radio of National Resistance," becoming a clearinghouse for broadcasting requests for humanitarian, medical, and military materiel and connecting donors with those requesting help, as reported by The New Yorker, "The Anne Levine Show" on WOMR, CBC, and other media outlets. As Kraina FM General Manager Bogdan Bolkhovetsky explained to Cape Cod radio host Anne Levine, "We invite our military listeners to call in and to say what they need right now. And they might need binoculars, they might need printers to print out some documents or papers. They might need socks. They might need computers or laptop. They might need some medicine. And people who listen to the station, if this member of the audience, if he has a laptop at home, he just brings him to the military guys ... or they just contact us through the webpage or through social media [and] we just text him the phone number of the person who was asking for a printer ... the information you listen to, it will save your life ... It might literally save your life or you might save somebody's life."

== Locations of broadcasting ==
Broadcasting map of radio «Kraina FM».

- Kyiv - 100.0 FM
- Kramatorsk - 89.4 FM
