= The Touch of Your Lips (Chet Baker album) =

Studio album by Chet Baker Trio
- Released: 1979
- Recorded: June 21, 1979
- Genre: Jazz
- Length: 47:43 CD release with bonus track
- Label: SteepleChase; SCS 1122
- Producer: Nils Winther

Chet Baker chronology
Ballads for Two (1979)	The Touch of Your Lips (1979)	Rendez-Vous (1979)

The Touch of Your Lips is an album by trumpeter/vocalist Chet Baker, recorded in 1979 and released on the Danish SteepleChase label.

== Reception ==
Professional ratings
Review scores
Source	Rating
AllMusic	4/5 stars
The Penguin Guide to Jazz Recordings	3.5/4 stars
The Rolling Stone Jazz Record Guide	3/5 stars

The Globe and Mail wrote that, "with his subtle trumpet and vocal styles, he is one of the great expressionists, an artist whose emotional power exceeds his musical virtuosity."

The AllMusic review by Scott Yanow states: "This was the perfect setting during his later years. The trumpeter (who also sings on two of the six songs) sounds very relaxed and comfortable".

== Track listing ==
1. "I Waited for You" (Dizzy Gillespie, Gil Fuller) – 8:08
2. "But Not for Me" (George Gershwin, Ira Gershwin) – 6:04
3. "Autumn in New York" (Vernon Duke) – 5:57
4. "The Blue Room" (Richard Rodgers, Lorenz Hart) – 8:40
5. "The Touch of Your Lips" (Ray Noble) – 8:19
6. "Star Eyes" (Gene de Paul, Don Raye) – 5:45
7. "Autumn in New York" [take 2] (Duke) – 4:47 Bonus track on CD release

== Personnel ==
- Chet Baker – trumpet, vocals
- Doug Raney – guitar
- Niels-Henning Ørsted Pedersen – bass
