= Chet Baker Plays Vladimir Cosma =

Studio album by Chet Baker
- Released: 1985
- Recorded: 1985
- Genre: Cool jazz, soundtrack
- Length: 35:21
- Label: Carrere Records

Chet Baker Plays Vladimir Cosma is a 1985 album by jazz trumpeter Chet Baker, released by French company Carrere Records. It features rearrangements of songs written by Romanian film score composer Vladimir Cosma.

== Track listing ==
All songs composed by Vladimir Cosma.

=== Side A ===
1. "B.B. Blues" – 5:56
2. "Yves et Danielle (Thème du film Salut l'artiste)" – 3:28
3. "Hobbylog" – 4:53
4. "Promenade sentimentale (Thème du film Diva)" – 3:43

=== Side B ===
1. "12+12 (Thème du film Le jumeau)" – 4:15
2. "Two Much" – 4:54
3. "Douceurs ternaires" – 4:56
4. "Pintade a jeun (Thème du film Nous irons tous au paradis)" – 3:16

== Personnel ==
- Chet Baker – trumpet, vocals
- Pierre Gossez – saxophone, clarinet
- Herve Sellin – piano
- Maurice Vander – piano
- Jean-Jacques Justafre – French horn
- Paul Minck – French horn
- Niels-Henning Ørsted Pedersen – double bass
- John Guerin – drums
