= The Touch of Your Lips =

Single by Al Bowlly accompanied by Ray Noble and His Orchestra
- Published: 1936
- Genre: Romantic Ballad
- Composer: Ray Noble

The Touch of Your Lips" is a romantic ballad written by Ray Noble in 1936. The original version of the song, which has become a standard, was by Al Bowlly accompanied by Ray Noble and His Orchestra.

Three versions of the song reached the charts of the day in the USA in 1936. They were by Hal Kemp (#3), Bing Crosby (#4) and Ray Noble (#12). The Crosby version was recorded on March 24, 1936 with Victor Young and his Orchestra.

== Versions ==
"The Touch of Your Lips" has appeared on the following albums:

- Chet Baker - The Touch of Your Lips (1979)
- Tony Bennett – The Tony Bennett/Bill Evans Album (1975); duet with pianist Bill Evans
- Pat Boone - The Touch of Your Lips (1964)\
- Nat King Cole – The Touch of Your Lips (1961)
- Vic Damone - That Towering Feeling! (1956)
- Bill Evans - Bill Evans at the Montreux Jazz Festival (1968)
- Bill Evans – Alone (Again) (recorded in December 1975 but not released until 1977)
- Art Farmer - Modern Art (1958)
- Clare Fischer – Alone Together (1977; rec. 1975; released in US, 1980)
- The Hi-Lo's – The Hi-Lo's On Hand (1956)
- Frankie Laine - You Are My Love (1960)
- Johnny Mathis – This Is Love (1964)
- Oscar Peterson – Ben Webster Meets Oscar Peterson (1959)
- Cliff Richard – Cliff Sings (1959); with Norrie Paramor & his Orchestra
- Bobby Timmons – Soul Time (1960); with Art Blakey, Blue Mitchell, and Sam Jones
- Andy Williams – Warm and Willing
