= Into My Life (album) =

Studio album by Chet Baker and the Carmel Strings
- Released: 1966
- Recorded: October 1966; Los Angeles, California
- Genre: Jazz
- Label: World Pacific
- Producer: Richard Bock

Chet Baker chronology
Double-Shot (1966)	Into My Life (1966)	In the Mood (1966)

Into My Life is a studio album by jazz trumpeter Chet Baker and the Carmel Strings recorded in 1966 and released on the World Pacific label.

== Reception ==
Professional ratings
Review scores
Source	Rating
Allmusic	3/5 stars

Allmusic rated the album with 3 stars.

== Track listing ==
1. "A Man and a Woman (Un Homme et une Femme)" (Francis Lai) - 2:10
2. "Guantanamera" (Joseíto Fernández) - 3:05
3. "I've Got My Love to Keep Me Warm" (Irving Berlin) - 3:04
4. "The Ballad of the Sad Young Men" (Jay Landesman, Fran Landesman, Thomas Wolf) - 4:09
5. "Here, There and Everywhere" (John Lennon, Paul McCartney) - 2:45
6. "Cherry Pink (and Apple Blossom White)" (Louis Guglielmi, Mack David) - 2:50
7. "Serenata" (Mitchell Parish, Leroy Anderson) - 1:50
8. "More and More Amor" (Sol Lake) - 2:59
9. "All" - 2:56
10. "If He Walked Into My Life" (Jerry Herman) - 4:03
11. "Trains and Boats and Planes" (Burt Bacharach, Hal David) - 2:22
12. "Got to Get You Into My Life" (Lennon, McCartney) - 2:15

== Personnel ==
- Chet Baker - flugelhorn
- The Carmel Strings
- Harry Betts - arranger, conductor
