= Beautiful Black Eyes =

Song

Beautiful Black Eyes is a song attributed variously to either Wayne Shorter or Lou McConnell. Chet Baker recorded several live versions of this song between 1978 and 1980, sometimes introducing it onstage as Lovely Black Eyes

Other performances include the Andrew Colman Quartet and Julian & Roman Wasserfuhr.

Morton, Brian; Cook, Richard (2010). The Penguin Jazz Guide: The History of the Music in the 1000 Best Albums.
