= Roy Haynes discography =

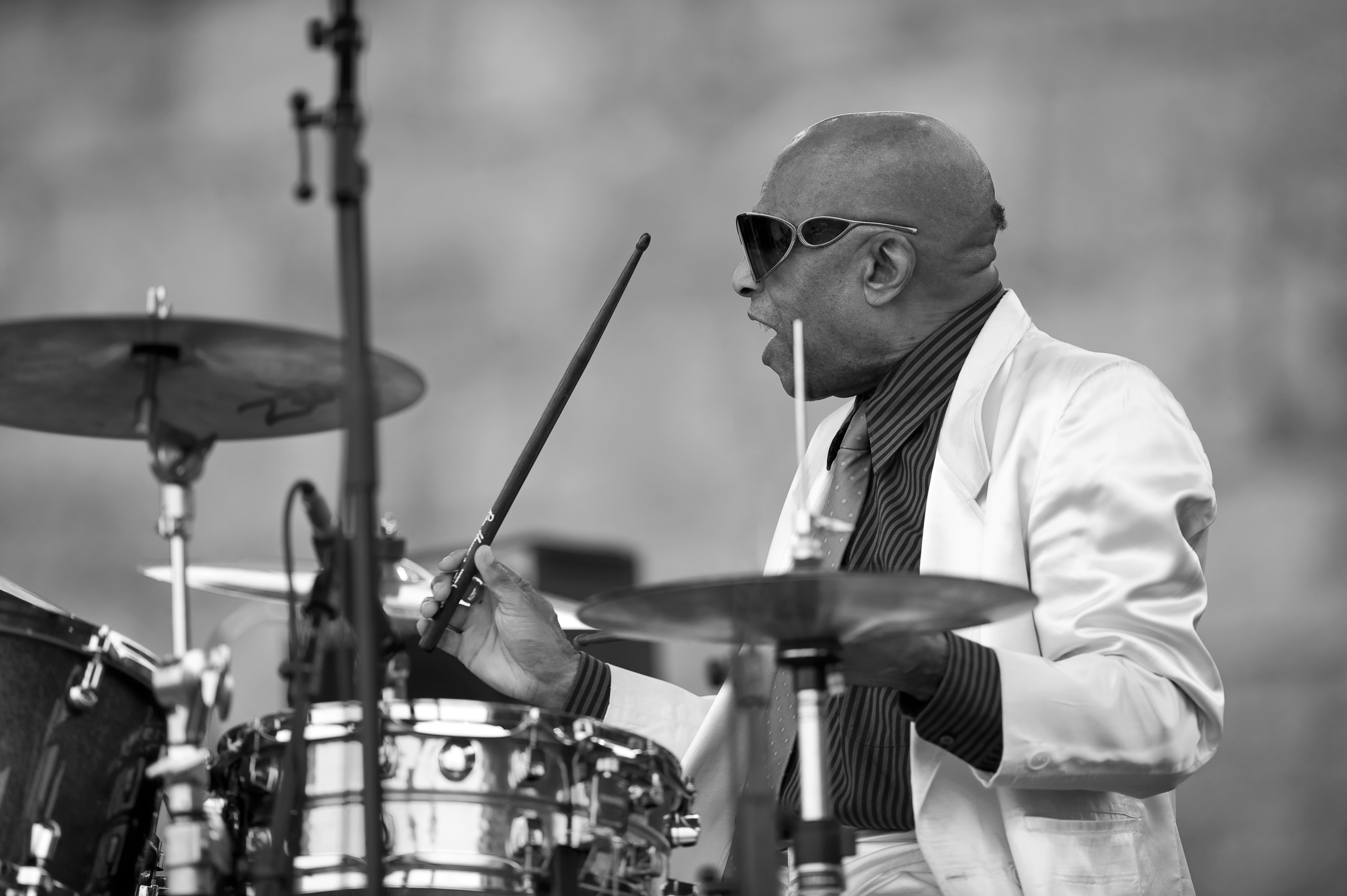
Haynes, George Wein's CareFusion Jazz Festival 55, Newport, Rhode Island, 2009

The discography of American jazz drummer Roy Haynes includes at least 32 records with Haynes as leader or co-leader, as well as a large number of records where he played as a sideman, and a number of compilation albums.

== As leader/co-leader ==
- Roy Haynes Modern Group (Swing, 1955) – recorded in 1954
- Busman's Holiday (EmArcy, 1955)
- Jazz Abroad (Mercury, 1956) – recorded in 1953. split album with Quincy Jones.
- We Three with Paul Chambers & Phineas Newborn (New Jazz, 1959) – recorded in 1958
- Just Us (New Jazz, 1960)
- Out of the Afternoon (Impulse!, 1962)
- Cracklin' with Booker Ervin (New Jazz, 1963)
- Cymbalism (New Jazz, 1963)
- People (Pacific Jazz, 1964)
- Hip Ensemble (Mainstream, 1971)
- Senyah (Mainstream, 1972)
- Booty with Blue Mitchell, Charles Kynard, Charles Williams (Mainstream, 1974)
- Togyu (RCA, 1975) – recorded in 1973
- Jazz a Confronto Vol. 29 (Horo, 1976)
- Sugar Roy (Kitty, 1976)
- Thank You Thank You (Galaxy, 1977)
- Vistalite (Galaxy, 1979) – recorded in 1977
- True or False (Freelance, 1986)
- Encounters with Mark Isaacs, Dave Holland (ABC, 1990) – recorded in 1988
- Equipoise (Mainstream, 1991) – reissue of Hip Ensemble (1971) with 1 additional track "Roy's Tune"
- When It's Haynes It Roars (Dreyfus Jazz, 1992)
- Live at the Riverbop (Marge, 1993) – live recorded in 1979
- Homecoming (Evidence, 1994) – live recorded in 1992
- Te Vou! (Dreyfus Jazz, 1994)
- My Shining Hour with Thomas Clausen's Jazzparticipants (Storyville, 1995) – recorded in 1994
- Praise (Dreyfus Jazz, 1998)
- The Roy Haynes Trio featuring Danilo Perez & John Patitucci (Verve, 2000) – recorded in 1999
- Birds of a Feather: A Tribute to Charlie Parker (Dreyfus Jazz, 2001) – Grammy-nominated album
- Love Letters (Eighty-Eight's, 2002)
- Whereas (Dreyfus Jazz, 2006)
- The Island (Explore, 2007) – recorded in 1990
- Roy-Alty (Dreyfus Jazz, 2011)

== Compilations ==
- Fountain of Youth (Dreyfus Jazz, 2004) – Grammy-nominated album
- Quiet Fire (Galaxy, 2004) – reissue of Thank You Thank You (1977) and Vistalite (1977)
- A Life in Time: The Roy Haynes Story (Dreyfus Jazz, 2007) [3CD + DVD-Video] – Grammy-nominated track included

== As sideman ==
In recorded year order

- 1947: Lester Young, The Complete Aladdin Recordings of Lester Young (Blue Note, 1995)[2CD]
- 1949: Kai Winding, Modern Jazz Trombones (Prestige, 1952)
- 1949–1950: Stan Getz, Stan Getz Quartets (Prestige)
- 1950: Charlie Parker, Bird at St. Nick's (Jazz Workshop, 1958)
- 1949–51: Bud Powell, The Amazing Bud Powell (Blue Note, 1952)[10 inch]
- 1950–52: Wardell Gray, Memorial Album (Prestige, 1964)[2LP]
- 1951–53: Miles Davis, Miles Davis and Horns (Prestige, 1956)
- 1950–54: Stan Getz, The Complete Roost Recordings (Blue Note, 1997)
- 1954: Sarah Vaughan, Sarah Vaughan (EmArcy, 1955)
- 1954?: Cal Tjader, Vibist (Savoy, 1954)
- 1954?: Eddie Shu, I Only Have Eyes For Shu (Bethlehem, 1955)
- 1955: Sarah Vaughan, In the Land of Hi-Fi (EmArcy, 1955)
- 1955: Nat Adderley, Introducing Nat Adderley (Wing, 1955)
- 1949–56: Milt Jackson, Meet Milt Jackson (Savoy, 1956)
- 1956: Red Rodney Quintet, Modern Music from Chicago (Fantasy, 1983)
- 1954–57: Sarah Vaughan, Swingin' Easy (EmArcy, 1957)
- 1957: Sonny Rollins, The Sound of Sonny (Riverside, 1957)
- 1958: Sarah Vaughan, After Hours at the London House (Mercury, 1959)
- 1958: Thelonious Monk, Thelonious in Action (Riverside, 1958) – live
- 1958: Thelonious Monk, Misterioso (Riverside, 1958) – live
- 1958: Thelonious Monk, Live at the Five Spot Discovery! (Blue Note, 1993)
- 1958: Art Farmer, Portrait of Art Farmer (Contemporary, 1958)
- 1958: Art Blakey, Drums Around the Corner (Blue Note, 1999)
- 1958: Sonny Rollins, Brass & Trio (MetroJazz, 1958)
- 1958: Dorothy Ashby, In a Minor Groove (New Jazz, 1958)
- 1958: John Handy, In the Vernacular (Roulette, 1958)
- 1958: George Shearing, Latin Affair (Capitol, 1959)
- 1959: Randy Weston, Live at the Five Spot (United Artists, 1959) – live
- 1959: Kenny Burrell, A Night at the Vanguard (Argo, 1959) – live
- 1959: Phineas Newborn, Jr. Piano Portraits by Phineas Newborn (Roulette, 1959)
- 1959: Sonny Stitt, The Sonny Side of Stitt (Roost, 1960)
- 1959: Phineas Newborn, Jr. I Love a Piano (Roulette, 1960)
- 1959: Lee Konitz, You and Lee (Verve, 1959)
- 1960: Eric Dolphy, Outward Bound (New Jazz, 1960)
- 1960: Eric Dolphy, Out There (New Jazz, 1961)
- 1960: Eric Dolphy, Far Cry (New Jazz, 1962)
- 1960: Etta Jones, Don't Go to Strangers (Prestige, 1960)
- 1960: Booker Little, Booker Little (Time, 1960)
- 1960: Betty Roché, Singin' & Swingin' (Prestige, 1960)
- 1960: Tommy Flanagan, The Tommy Flanagan Trio (Moodsville, 1960)
- 1960: Eddie "Lockjaw" Davis Big Band, Trane Whistle (Prestige, 1960)
- 1960: Oliver Nelson, Taking Care of Business (New Jazz, 1960)
- 1960: Oliver Nelson, Nocturne (Moodsville, 1961)
- 1960: Oliver Nelson, King Curtis & Jimmy Forrest, Soul Battle (Prestige, 1962)
- 1960: Sonny Stitt Stittsville, Sonny Side Up (Roost, 1961)
- 1960: Kai Winding & J. J. Johnson, The Great Kai & J. J. (Impulse!, 1961)
- 1960: Lem Winchester, Lem Winchester with Feeling (Moodsville, 1961)
- 1960: Steve Lacy, The Straight Horn of Steve Lacy (Candid, 1961)
- 1960: Ray Charles, Genius + Soul = Jazz (Impulse!, 1961)
- 1960: Oliver Nelson, Screamin' the Blues (New Jazz, 1961)
- 1960–61: Etta Jones, Something Nice (Prestige, 1961)
- 1961: Oliver Nelson, Straight Ahead (New Jazz, 1961)
- 1961: Oliver Nelson, The Blues and the Abstract Truth (Impulse!, 1961)
- 1961: Jaki Byard, Here's Jaki (New Jazz, 1961)
- 1961: Ted Curson, Plenty of Horn (Old Town, 1961)
- 1961: Stan Getz and Bob Brookmeyer, Recorded Fall 1961 (Verve, 1961)
- 1961: Stan Getz, Focus (Verve, 1962)
- 1962: Jackie Paris, The Song Is Paris (Impulse!, 1962)
- 1962: Roland Kirk, Domino (Mercury, 1962)
- 1962: Willis Jackson, Bossa Nova Plus (Prestige, 1962)
- 1960–62: Sonny Stitt, Stitt in Orbit (Roost, 1963)
- 1960–62: Jimmy Forrest, Soul Street (New Jazz, 1962)
- 1962: McCoy Tyner, Reaching Fourth (Impulse!, 1963)
- 1962: Ted Curson, Ted Curson Plays Fire Down Below (Prestige, 1963)
- 1961-63: John Coltrane, Impressions (Impulse!, 1963)
- 1961–63: John Coltrane, Newport '63 (Impulse!, 1993)
- 1963: Frank Wess, Yo Ho! Poor You, Little Me (Prestige, 1963)
- 1963: Andrew Hill, Black Fire (Blue Note, 1964)
- 1963: Andrew Hill, Smokestack (Blue Note, 1966)
- 1963: Jackie McLean, Destination... Out! (Blue Note, 1964)
- 1964: Jackie McLean, It's Time! (Blue Note, 1965)
- 1961–64: Jaki Byard, Out Front! (Prestige, 1965)
- 1964: Jimmy Witherspoon, Blue Spoon (Prestige, 1964)
- 1966: Stan Getz, The Stan Getz Quartet in Paris (Verve, 1967)
- 1966: Gary Burton, Tennessee Firebird (RCA, 1967)
- 1967: Gary Burton, Duster (RCA, 1967)
- 1966–68: Stan Getz, What the World Needs Now: Stan Getz Plays Burt Bacharach and Hal David (Verve, 1968)
- 1968: Archie Shepp, The Way Ahead (Impulse!, 1968)
- 1968: Chick Corea, Now He Sings, Now He Sobs (Solid State, 1968)
- 1968: Jack DeJohnette, The DeJohnette Complex (Milestone, 1969)
- 1969: Gary Burton, Country Roads & Other Places (RCA, 1968)
- 1969: Leon Thomas, Spirits Known and Unknown (Flying Dutchman, 1970)
- 1969: Oliver Nelson, Black, Brown and Beautiful (Flying Dutchman, 1970)
- 1969: Clifford Jordan, In the World (Strata-East, 1972)
- 1970: Leon Thomas, The Leon Thomas Album (Flying Dutchman, 1970)
- 1970–71: Pharoah Sanders, Thembi (Impulse!, 1971)
- 1971: Gato Barbieri, Under Fire (Flying Dutchman, 1973)
- 1974: Dave Brubeck, All The Things We Are (Atlantic, 1976)
- 1975: Duke Jordan Quartet, Misty Thursday (SteepleChase, 1976)
- 1976: Duke Jordan Trio, Live in Japan (SteepleChase, 1977)
- 1976: Duke Jordan Trio, Flight to Japan (SteepleChase, 1978)
- 1976: Tommy Flanagan, Trinity (Inner City, 1980)
- 1976: Warne Marsh, How Deep, How High (Interplay, 1980)
- 1977: Mary Lou Williams, A Grand Night For Swinging (High Note, 2008)
- 1977?: Nick Brignola Sextet with Pepper Adams, Baritone Madness (Galaxy, 1978)
- 1978: Dizzy Reece, Manhattan Project (Bee Hive, 1978)
- 1978: Dizzy Reece and Ted Curson, Blowin' Away (Interplay, 1978)
- 1978?: Johnny Griffin, Birds and Ballads (Galaxy, 1978)
- 1978: Gary Burton, Times Square (ECM, 1979)
- 1978: Alice Coltrane, Transfiguration (Warner Bros., 1978)[2LP]
- 1978: Art Pepper, Art Pepper Today (Galaxy, 1979)
- 1978: Sal Nistico, Neo/Nistico (Bee Hive, 1978)
- 1978: Red Garland, Equinox (Galaxy, 1979)
- 1978: Hank Jones, Ain't Misbehavin' (Galaxy, 1979)
- 1978: Stanley Cowell, Equipoise (Galaxy, 1979)
- 1978: Archie Shepp, Lady Bird (Denon, 1979)
- 1979: Ted Curson, The Trio (Interplay, 1979)
- 1979: Joe Albany, Bird Lives! (Interplay, 1979)
- 1981: Chick Corea, Trio Music (ECM, 1982)
- 1983: Freddie Hubbard, Sweet Return (Atlantic, 1983)
- 1983?: Toshiyuki Honda, Dream (Eastworld, 1983)
- 1984: Chick Corea, Trio Music Live in Europe (ECM, 1986) – live. Grammy nominated album.
- 1987: McCoy Tyner, Blues for Coltrane: A Tribute to John Coltrane (Impulse!, 1988) – Grammy won album
- 1987: Michel Petrucciani, Michel plays Petrucciani (Blue Note, 1988)
- 1987: Chick Corea, Live in Montreaux (GRP, 1994) – live
- 1988: Mark Isaacs, Encounters, with Dave Holland (ABC, 1990 & 1995; veraBra, 1991; Gracemusic, 2013)
- 1989: Pat Metheny, Question and Answer (Geffen, 1990)
- 1994: Kenny Barron, Wanton Spirit (Verve, 1994) – Grammy nominated album
- 1995: Michel Petrucciani & Stephane Grappelli, Flamingo (Dreyfus, 1996)
- 1996: Chick Corea, Remembering Bud Powell (Stretch, 1997) – Grammy nominated album
- 1997: Gary Burton, Like Minds (Concord, 1998) – Grammy won album
- 2010: Sonny Rollins, Road Shows vol. 2 (Doxy, 2011) – live
