= Flight to Denmark =

Studio album by Duke Jordan
- Released: 1974
- Recorded: November 25 & December 2, 1973
- Studio: Sound Track studio in Copenhagen, Denmark
- Genre: Jazz
- Length: 67:31 CD with bonus tracks
- Label: SteepleChase SCS 1011
- Producer: Nils Winther

Duke Jordan chronology
The Murray Hill Caper (1973)	Flight to Denmark (1974)	Two Loves (1974)

Flight to Denmark is an album led by pianist Duke Jordan. It was recorded in 1973 and released on the Danish SteepleChase label.

== Reception ==
Professional ratings
Review scores
Source	Rating
AllMusic	4.5/5 stars
The Penguin Guide to Jazz Recordings	2.5/4 stars

In his review for AllMusic, Michael G. Nastos said "This is Duke Jordan at his most magnificent, with the ever-able Vinding and expert Thigpen playing their professional roles perfectly, producing perhaps the second best effort (next to Flight to Jordan from 13 years hence) from the famed bop pianist".

== Track listing ==
All compositions by Duke Jordan except as indicated

1. "No Problem" – 6:41
2. "Here's That Rainy Day" (Jimmy Van Heusen, Johnny Burke) – 7:25
3. "Everything Happens To Me" (Matt Dennis, Tom Adair) – 5:34
4. "Glad I Met Pat" [Take 3] – 5:03 Bonus track on CD release
5. "Glad I Met Pat" [Take 4] – 5:22
6. "How Deep Is the Ocean?" (Irving Berlin) – 7:31
7. "On Green Dolphin Street" (Bronisław Kaper, Ned Washington) – 8:15
8. "If I Did - Would You?" [Take 1] – 3:41 Bonus track on CD release
9. "If I Did - Would You?" [Take 2] – 3:50
10. "Flight to Denmark" – 5:43
11. "No Problem" – 7:09 Bonus track on CD release
12. "Jordu" – 4:54 Bonus track on CD release

== Personnel ==
- Duke Jordan – piano
- Mads Vinding – bass
- Ed Thigpen – drums
