= Time on My Hands =

Time on My Hands may refer to:

- "Time on My Hands" (song), a 1930 popular song
- Time on My Hands (John Scofield album), 1990
- Time on My Hands (Duke Jordan album), 1988
- "Time on My Hands" (Dad's Army), an episode of the British situation comedy Dad's Army
- "Time on My Hands" an episode of the animated television series Rocky and Bullwinkle
- Time on My Hands (film), a 1932 animated film
