= Two for the Show =

Two for the Show may refer to:

- Two for the Show (musical), a 1940 Broadway musical
- Two for the Show (Jack Greene and Jeannie Seely album), 1972
- Two for the Show (Trooper album), 1976
- Two for the Show (Kansas album), 1978
- Two for the Show (David Friesen album), 1994
