= Tivoli One =

Tivili One

Live album by Duke Jordan Trio
- Released: 1984
- Recorded: December 16–17, 1978
- Venue: The Tivolis Koncertsal in Copenhagen, Denmark
- Genre: Jazz
- Length: 64:51
- Label: SteepleChase SCS 1189
- Producer: Nils Winther

Duke Jordan chronology
The Great Session (1978)	Tivili One (1984)	Tivoli Two (1978)

Tivoli One is a live album by pianist Duke Jordan's Trio recorded at the Tivolis Koncertsal and first released on the Danish SteepleChase label in 1984.

== Reception ==
Professional ratings
Review scores
Source	Rating
AllMusic	4.5/5 stars
The Penguin Guide to Jazz Recordings	2.5/4 stars

AllMusic reviewer Scott Yanow stated "This is a fine all-around trio date for veteran pianist Duke Jordan".

== Track listing ==
All compositions by Duke Jordan except as indicated

1. "Subway Blues" - 7:31
2. "Embraceable You" (George Gershwin, Ira Gershwin) - 6:17
3. "Night Train from Snekkersten" - 7:41
4. "My Heart Skips a Beat" - 8:19 Bonus track on CD reissue
5. "If I Did - Would You?" - 6:13 Bonus track on CD reissue
6. "Glad I Met Pat" - 8:26 Bonus track on CD reissue
7. "Four" (Eddie "Cleanhead" Vinson) - 5:28
8. "Misty Thursday" - 4:31
9. "I Remember April" (Gene de Paul, Patricia Johnston, Don Raye) - 8:32
10. "Jordu" - 1:53

== Personnel ==
- Duke Jordan - piano
- Wilbur Little - bass
- Dannie Richmond - drums
