= Lover Man (Duke Jordan album) =

Studio album by Duke Jordan Trio
- Released: 1979
- Recorded: November 18, 1975 in NYC
- Genre: Jazz
- Length: 55:41 CD with bonus tracks
- Label: SteepleChase SCS 1127
- Producer: Nils Winther

Duke Jordan chronology
Duke's Delight (1975)	Lover Man (1979)	Live in Japan (1976)

Lover Man is an album led by pianist Duke Jordan recorded in 1975 but not released on the Danish SteepleChase label until 1979.

== Reception ==
Professional ratings
Review scores
Source	Rating
AllMusic	3/5 stars
The Penguin Guide to Jazz Recordings	3/4 stars

AllMusic awarded the album 3 stars.

== Track listing ==
All compositions by Duke Jordan except as indicated

1. "Dig" (Miles Davis) - 4:22
2. "Dancer's Call" - 6:11
3. "Love Train" - 8:51
4. "Don't Blame Me" (Dorothy Fields, Jimmy McHugh) - 5:57 Bonus track on CD release
5. "Sea" (Al Foster) - 4:08 Bonus track on CD release
6. "Lover Man" (Jimmy Davis, Ram Ramirez, Jimmy Sherman) - 6:59
7. "They Say It's Wonderful" (Irving Berlin) - 6:19
8. "Out of Nowhere" (Johnny Green, Edward Heyman) - 6:13

== Personnel ==
- Duke Jordan - piano
- Sam Jones - bass
- Al Foster - drums
