= Dedication (Mal Waldron album) =

Studio album by Mal Waldron & David Friesen
- Released: 1988
- Recorded: November 18, 1985
- Genre: Jazz
- Length: 53:03
- Label: Soul Note

Mal Waldron chronology
Songs of Love and Regret (1985)	Dedication (1988)	Space (1986)

Dedication is an album by American jazz pianist Mal Waldron and bassist David Friesen recorded in 1985 and released by the Italian Soul Note label.

== Reception ==
The Allmusic review awarded the album 3 stars.

Professional ratings
Review scores
Source	Rating
Allmusic	3/5 stars
The Penguin Guide to Jazz Recordings	3/4 stars

== Track listing ==
All compositions by Mal Waldron except as indicated

1. "Dedication" (David Friesen, Mal Waldron) — 10:02
2. "All God's Chillun Got Rhythm" (Bronislaw Kaper, Walter Jurmann, Gus Kahn) — 6:05
3. "It Never Entered My Mind" (Lorenz Hart, Richard Rodgers) — 8:27
4. "Rhythmics" — 13:29
5. "Mowgly the Cat" — 5:00
6. "Tapestry" (Friesen) — 3:59
7. "Batik" (Friesen) — 6:01
  - Recorded in Milan, Italy on November 18, 1985

== Personnel ==
- Mal Waldron — piano
- David Friesen — bass
