= Duke's Delight =

Studio album by Duke Jordan Quintet
- Released: 1976
- Recorded: November 18, 1975
- Studio: C. I. Recording Studios, NYC
- Genre: Jazz
- Length: 60:11 CD with bonus tracks
- Label: SteepleChase SCS 1046
- Producer: Nils Winther

Duke Jordan chronology
Misty Thursday (1975)	Duke's Delight (1976)	Lover Man (1975)

Duke's Delight is an album led by pianist Duke Jordan recorded in 1975 and released on the Danish SteepleChase label.

== Reception ==
Professional ratings
Review scores
Source	Rating
AllMusic	4.5/5 stars
The Penguin Guide to Jazz Recordings	3.5/4 stars

In his review for AllMusic, Scott Yanow said "The date lives up to its potential".

== Track listing ==
All compositions by Duke Jordan except as indicated

1. "Truth" – 7:55
2. "(In My) Solitude" (Eddie DeLange, Duke Ellington, Irving Mills) – 5:36
3. "Sultry Eve" – 9:46
4. "Undecided Lady" – 6:07
5. "Tall Grass" – 9:13
6. "Duke's Delight" – 7:25
7. "Undecided Lady" [Alternate Take] – 6:32 Bonus track on CD release
8. "Duke's Delight" [Alternate Take] – 7:37 Bonus track on CD release

== Personnel ==
- Duke Jordan – piano
- Richard Williams – trumpet (tracks 1 & 3–8)
- Charlie Rouse – tenor saxophone (tracks 1 & 3–8)
- Sam Jones – bass (tracks 1 & 3–8)
- Al Foster – drums (tracks 1 & 3–8)
