= As Time Goes By (Duke Jordan album) =

Studio album by Duke Jordan Trio
- Released: 1989
- Recorded: July 29, 1985, in Copenhagen, Denmark; Bonus tracks recorded January–February 1979
- Genre: Jazz
- Length: 58:35; CD reissue with 5 bonus tracks
- Label: SteepleChase SCS 1247
- Producer: Nils Winther

Duke Jordan chronology
| Time on My Hands (1985) | As Time Goes By (1989) | Acoustic Live at 3361 Black (1987) |

As Time Goes By is an album by pianist Duke Jordan recorded in 1985 and released on the Danish SteepleChase label.

== Reception ==
Professional ratings
Review scores
| Source | Rating |
|---|---|
| AllMusic | 4/5 stars |

AllMusic awarded the album 4 stars.

== Track listing ==
1. "In a Mellow Tone" (Duke Ellington, Milt Gabler) - 6:45
2. "Lady Dingbat" (Duke Jordan) - 3:09 Bonus track on CD reissue
3. "A Foggy Day" (George Gershwin, Ira Gershwin) - 6:36
4. "Answer Me" (Gerhard Winkler, Carl Sigman) - 3:37
5. "Layout Blues" (Jordan) - 4:43
6. "Glad I Met Pat" (Jordan) - 3:38 Bonus track on CD reissue
7. "W'utless" (Jordan) - 2:58 Bonus track on CD reissue
8. "As Time Goes By" (Herman Hupfeld) - 5:02
9. "Jordanish" (Jordan) - 2:43 Bonus track on CD reissue
10. "Drawers" (Jordan) - 6:48
11. "Lush Life/Smoke Gets in Your Eyes" (Billy Strayhorn/Jerome Kern, Otto Harbach) - 5:32
12. "When You're Smiling" (Mark Fisher, Joe Goodwin, Larry Shay) - 3:57
13. "Mellow Mood" (Jordan) - 3:07 Bonus track on CD reissue

== Personnel ==
- Duke Jordan - piano
- Jesper Lundgaard - bass (tracks 1, 3–5, 8 & 10–12)
- Billy Hart - drums (tracks 1, 3–5, 8 & 10–12)
