= Thinking of You (Duke Jordan album) =

Studio album by Duke Jordan Trio
- Released: 1982
- Recorded: July 11, 1978 in New York City and October 29, 1979 in Copenhagen, Denmark
- Genre: Jazz
- Length: 42:13 CD with bonus tracks
- Label: SteepleChase SCS 1165
- Producer: Nils Winther

Duke Jordan chronology
Solo Masterpieces Vol. 2 (1979)	Thinking of You (1982)	Change a Pace (1979)

Thinking of You is an album led by pianist Duke Jordan recorded in 1979 in Denmark (with one track from 1978) and released on the Danish SteepleChase label in 1982.

== Reception ==
Professional ratings
Review scores
Source	Rating
AllMusic	4.5/5 stars

AllMusic awarded the album 4½ stars stating it "swings nicely in an underplayed fashion".

== Track listing ==
All compositions by Duke Jordan

1. "The Fuzz" - 4:46
2. "Thinking of You" - 5:47
3. "Anything Can Happen" - 6:32
4. "The Peanut Bar" - 4:00
5. "Foxie Cakes" - 5:27
6. "Light Foot" - 5:41
7. "My Queen Is Home to Stay" - 4:21
8. "Deacon's Blues" - 5:11
9. "Diamond Stud" - 5:03 Bonus track on CD reissue
10. "It's Hard to Know" - 7:14 Bonus track on CD reissue

== Personnel ==
- Duke Jordan - piano
- Niels-Henning Ørsted Pedersen - bass (tracks 1–4 & 6–10)
- Billy Hart - drums (tracks 1–4 & 6–10)
