= Art Pepper with Duke Jordan in Copenhagen 1981 =

Live album by Art Pepper and Duke Jordan
- Released: 1996
- Recorded: July 3, 1981
- Venue: Jazzhus Montmartre, Copenhagen, Denmark
- Genre: Jazz
- Length: 141:59
- Label: Galaxy; 2GCD 8201-2
- Producer: Ik Skovgaard

Art Pepper chronology
One September Afternoon (1980)	Art Pepper with Duke Jordan in Copenhagen 1981 (1996)	Roadgame (1981)

Duke Jordan chronology
Change a Pace (1979)	Art Pepper with Duke Jordan in Copenhagen 1981 (1981)	So Nice Duke (1982)

Art Pepper with Duke Jordan in Copenhagen 1981 is a live album by saxophonist Art Pepper and pianist Duke Jordan, recorded in 1981 at the Jazzhus Montmartre by Danmarks Radio and released on the Galaxy label as a double CD in 1996.

== Reception ==
Professional ratings
Review scores
Source	Rating
AllMusic	4/5 stars
The Penguin Guide to Jazz Recordings	3/4 stars

The AllMusic review by Steven McDonald noted, "Art Pepper was in the process of dying at the time this recording was made, but there's no lack of energy, no loss of vitality. A two-CD live jazz set that's well worth having and should not be overlooked".

== Track listing ==
All compositions by Art Pepper except where noted.

Disc one

1. "Blues Montmartre" – 14:01
2. "What Is This Thing Called Love?" (Cole Porter) – 9:27
3. "Over the Rainbow" (Harold Arlen, Yip Harburg) – 7:18
4. "Caravan" (Juan Tizol, Duke Ellington, Irving Mills) – 15:48
5. "Rhythm-a-Ning" (Thelonious Monk) – 14:26
6. "You Go to My Head" (J. Fred Coots, Haven Gillespie) – 12:18

Disc two

1. "Bésame Mucho" (Consuelo Velázquez, Sunny Skylar) – 22:06
2. "Cherokee" (Ray Noble) – 8:46
3. "Radio Blues" – 11:40
4. "Good Bait" (Tadd Dameron, Count Basie) – 10:41
5. "All the Things You Are" (Jerome Kern, Oscar Hammerstein II) – 15:28

== Personnel ==
- Art Pepper – alto saxophone, clarinet
- Duke Jordan – piano
- David Williams – bass
- Carl Burnett – drums
