= The Great Session =

Studio album by Duke Jordan
- Released: 1981
- Recorded: June 30, 1978 in New York City
- Genre: Jazz
- Length: 50:30 CD with bonus tracks
- Label: SteepleChase SCS 1150
- Producer: Nils Winther

Duke Jordan chronology
Duke's Artistry (1978)	The Great Session (1981)	Tivoli One (1978)

The Great Session is an album led by pianist Duke Jordan recorded in 1978 and released on the Danish SteepleChase label in 1981.

== Reception ==
Professional ratings
Review scores
Source	Rating
AllMusic	3.5/5 stars
The Penguin Guide to Jazz Recordings	3/4 stars

AllMusic awarded the album 3½ stars stating "There's a bit of hyperbole in the album's title, as the play list is hardly adventurous and the arrangements are average, in spite of the strong personnel".

== Track listing ==
1. "All the Things You Are" (Oscar Hammerstein II, Jerome Kern) - 6:36
2. "Moonglow" (Eddie DeLange, Will Hudson, Irving Mills) - 7:28
3. "Satin Doll" (Duke Ellington, Billy Strayhorn, Johnny Mercer) - 6:38
4. "Thinking of You" (Duke Jordan) - 8:55 Bonus track on CD release
5. "A Night in Tunisia" (Dizzy Gillespie, Frank Paparelli) - 9:53
6. "Lady Bird" (Tadd Dameron) - 6:57
7. "Blues in the Closet" (Oscar Pettiford) - 4:11

== Personnel ==
- Duke Jordan - piano
- David Friesen - bass
- Philly Joe Jones - drums
