= Truth (Duke Jordan album) =

Studio album by Duke Jordan Trio
- Released: 1983
- Recorded: March 2, 1975 in Copenhagen, Denmark
- Genre: Jazz
- Length: 46:28 CD with bonus tracks
- Label: SteepleChase SCS 1175
- Producer: Nils Winther

Duke Jordan chronology
| Two Loves (1973) | Truth (1983) | Misty Thursday (1975) |

Truth is an album led pianist Duke Jordan recorded in 1975 but not released on the Danish SteepleChase label until 1983.

== Reception ==
Professional ratings
Review scores
| Source | Rating |
|---|---|
| AllMusic | 3/5 stars |
| The Penguin Guide to Jazz Recordings | 3/4 stars |

In his review for AllMusic, Ken Dryden said "Although the eight originals performed on this session (with two alternate takes added for the CD reissue) never became very well known as his hit "Jordu," there are a number of enjoyable tunes".

== Track listing ==
All compositions by Duke Jordan

1. "Layout Blues" - 5:42
2. "32nd Street Love" - 5:33
3. "Truth" - 6:23
4. "There's a Star for You" - 6:04
5. "Misty Thursday" - 5:57
6. "Hymn to Peace" - 5:04
7. "Lady Linda" - 7:16
8. "Night Train from Snekkersten" - 4:40
9. "32nd Street Love" [Take 3] - 5:44 Bonus track on CD release
10. "Layout Blues" [Take 1] - 3:03 Bonus track on CD release

== Personnel ==
- Duke Jordan - piano
- Mads Vinding - bass
- Ed Thigpen - drums
