= Two Loves (album) =

Studio album by Duke Jordan Trio
- Released: 1974
- Recorded: November 25 and December 2, 1973
- Studio: Sound Track, Copenhagen, Denmark
- Genre: Jazz
- Length: 62:27 CD with bonus tracks
- Label: SteepleChase SCS 1024
- Producer: Nils Winther

Duke Jordan chronology
Flight to Denmark (1974)	Two Loves (1974)	Truth (1975)

Two Loves is an album led by pianist Duke Jordan recorded in 1973 and released on the Danish SteepleChase label.

== Reception ==
Professional ratings
Review scores
Source	Rating
AllMusic	4.5/5 stars
The Penguin Guide to Jazz Recordings	3/4 stars

In the review for AllMusic, Lee Bloom said "Jordan's style is perhaps the most subdued of the first generation bebop pianists; his touch is gentle, his chords are simply constructed, and his preference for medium tempos is evident. Though not the most flashy of beboppers, Jordan is quite an excellent composer. ...Overall, an enjoyable session despite a piano with less than perfect intonation and an unfortunately dry drum sound".

== Track listing ==
All compositions by Duke Jordan except as indicated

1. "Subway Inn" - 8:11
2. "My Old Flame" (Sam Coslow, Arthur Johnston) - 8:45
3. "Blue Monk" (Thelonious Monk) - 5:14
4. "Two Loves" - 3:05
5. "No Problem" [Take 1] - 7:09 Bonus track on CD release
6. "Glad I Met Pat" [Take 2] - 5:03 Bonus track on CD release
7. "Here's That Rainy Day" (Johnny Burke, Jimmy Van Heusen) - 1:55 Bonus track on CD release
8. "On Green Dolphin Street" (Bronisław Kaper, Ned Washington) - 8:05 Bonus track on CD release
9. "Embraceable You" (George Gershwin, Ira Gershwin) - 7:15
10. "Wait and See" - 2:44
11. "I'll Remember April" (Gene de Paul, Patricia Johnston, Don Raye) - 5:34
12. "Lady Dingbat" - 4:08
13. "Jordu" - 5:19

== Personnel ==
- Duke Jordan - piano
- Mads Vinding - bass
- Ed Thigpen - drums
