= Tivoli Two =

Live album by Duke Jordan Trio
- Released: 1984
- Recorded: December 16–17, 1978
- Venue: The Tivolis Koncertsal in Copenhagen, Denmark
- Genre: Jazz
- Length: 51:04
- Label: SteepleChase SCS 1193
- Producer: Nils Winther

Duke Jordan chronology
| Tivoli One (1978) | Tivoli Two (1984) | Wait and See (1978) |

Tivoli Two is a live album by pianist Duke Jordan's Trio recorded at the Tivolis Koncertsal and first released on the Danish SteepleChase label in 1984.

== Reception ==
Professional ratings
Review scores
| Source | Rating |
|---|---|
| AllMusic | 4.5/5 stars |

AllMusic reviewer Scott Yanow stated "Jordan is heard at the top of his game during these swinging and probing performances".

== Track listing ==
All compositions by Duke Jordan except as indicated

1. "No Problem" - 10:44
2. "How Deep Is the Ocean?" (Irving Berlin) - 6:37
3. "All the Things You Are" (Oscar Hammerstein II, Jerome Kern) - 6:51
4. "Jealous Blues" - 6:22
5. "I Cover the Waterfront" (Johnny Green, Edward Heyman) - 5:25
6. "A Night in Tunisia" (Dizzy Gillespie, Frank Paparelli) - 13:10
7. "Jordu" - 1:55

== Personnel ==
- Duke Jordan - piano
- Wilbur Little - bass
- Dannie Richmond - drums
