= Flight to Japan =

Studio album by Duke Jordan Trio
- Released: 1978
- Recorded: September 25, 1976
- Studio: Victor Studios in Tokyo, Japan
- Genre: Jazz
- Length: 42:36 (CD with bonus track)
- Label: SteepleChase SCS 1088
- Producer: Nils Winther

Duke Jordan chronology
Osaka Concert Vol. 2 (1976)	Flight to Japan (1978)	Flight to Norway (1976)

Flight to Japan is an album led by the pianist Duke Jordan, recorded in 1976 in Tokyo, and released on the Danish SteepleChase label in 1978.

== Reception ==
Professional ratings
Review scores
Source	Rating
AllMusic	3/5 stars
The Encyclopedia of Popular Music	3/5 stars
The Penguin Guide to Jazz Recordings	2.5/4 stars

AllMusic awarded the album 3 stars.

== Track listing ==
All compositions by Duke Jordan except as indicated

1. "Lullaby of the Orient" - 6:12
2. "Bridgetown" - 3:50
3. "The Bullet" - 3:41
4. "Love Hotel" - 5:27
5. "Stone Wall Blues" - 5:14
6. "I Can't Get Started" (Vernon Duke, Ira Gershwin) - 9:29
7. "Flight to Japan" - 4:47
8. "Table Chess" - 3:56 Bonus track on CD release

== Personnel ==
- Duke Jordan - piano
- Wilbur Little - double bass
- Roy Haynes - drums
