= Change a Pace =

Studio album by Duke Jordan Trio
- Released: 1980
- Recorded: October 29, 1979 in Copenhagen, Denmark
- Genre: Jazz
- Length: 51:16 CD with bonus tracks
- Label: SteepleChase SCS 1135
- Producer: Nils Winther

Duke Jordan chronology
Thinking of You (1979)	Change a Pace (1980)	Art Pepper with Duke Jordan in Copenhagen 1981 (1981)

Change a Pace is an album led by pianist Duke Jordan recorded in 1979 in Denmark and released on the Danish SteepleChase label in 1980.

== Reception ==
Professional ratings
Review scores
Source	Rating
AllMusic	2.5/5 stars

AllMusic awarded the album 2½ stars with a review by Ken Dryden stating "While none of Duke Jordan's compositions on this date ever became as well known as his "Jordu," "Flight to Jordan," or "No Problem," this session is warmly recommended".

== Track listing ==
All compositions by Duke Jordan.

1. "Change a Pace" - 5:46
2. "I Thought You'd Call Today" - 5:42
3. "Double Scotch" - 7:06
4. "Miss Kissed" - 5:24
5. "Diamond Stud" - 5:46
6. "It's Hard to Know" - 7:18
7. "Anything Can Happen" - 6:45 Bonus track on CD reissue
8. "Deacon's Blues" - 4:57 Bonus track on CD reissue
9. "My Queen Is Home to Stay" - 2:47 Bonus track on CD reissue

== Personnel ==
- Duke Jordan - piano
- Niels-Henning Ørsted Pedersen - bass
- Billy Hart - drums
