= Duke's Artistry =

Studio album by Duke Jordan Quartet
- Released: 1978
- Recorded: June 30, 1978 in New York City
- Genre: Jazz
- Length: 49:45 CD with bonus tracks
- Label: SteepleChase SCS 1103
- Producer: Nils Winther

Duke Jordan chronology
Flight to Norway (1976)	Duke's Artistry (1978)	The Great Session (1978)

Duke's Artistry is an album led by pianist Duke Jordan recorded in 1978 and released on the Danish SteepleChase label.

== Reception ==
Professional ratings
Review scores
Source	Rating
The Penguin Guide to Jazz Recordings	3/4 stars

In review issued on May 3, 1980, Billboard editors said that the songs of the album were "unspectacular" but the "beauty of this LP lies in its simplicity".

== Track listing ==
All compositions by Duke Jordan

1. "My Heart Skips a Beat" - 5:52
2. "Midnight Moonlight" - 6:39
3. "My Heart Skips a Beat" [Alternate Take 1] - 5:49 Bonus track on CD release
4. "My Heart Skips a Beat" [Alternate Take 2] - 4:55 Bonus track on CD release
5. "Lady Dingbat" - 8:18
6. "Midnite Bump No. 1" - 6:06 Bonus track on CD release
7. "Midnite Bump No. 2" - 6:09
8. "Dodge City Roots" - 5:57

== Personnel ==
- Duke Jordan - piano
- Art Farmer - flugelhorn
- David Friesen - bass
- Philly Joe Jones - drums
