= David Friesen =

American jazz bassist

- Born: May 6, 1942 (age 84); Tacoma, Washington, U.S.
- Spouse(s): Kirsten Friesen (m. 1964; died 2002) Natalie Digtyar
- Children: 3
- Relatives: Dyan Cannon (sister); Jennifer Grant (niece)
- Musical career
- Genre: Jazz
- Instruments: Double bass Electric upright bass

David Friesen (born May 6, 1942) is an American jazz bassist. He plays double bass and electric upright bass.

== Career ==
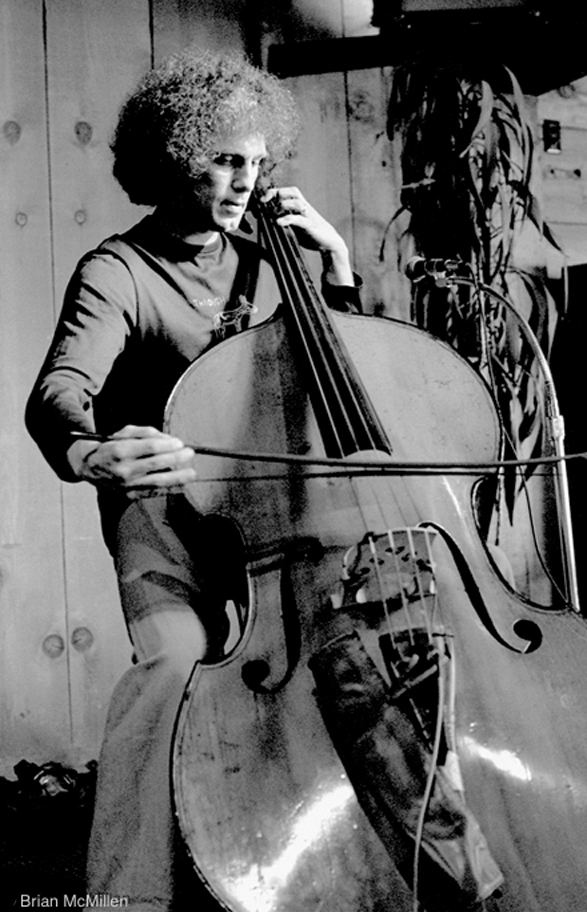
David Friesen at Bach Dancing & Dynamite Society, Half Moon Bay CA 1978

Friesen began playing bass while serving in the United States Army in Germany. He played with John Handy and Marian McPartland and following this, with Joe Henderson; in 1975, he toured in Europe with Billy Harper. His first album as a session leader appeared that year. In 1976, he began collaborating with guitarist John Stowell; the pair would work together often. He appeared with Ted Curson at the Monterey Jazz Festival in 1977. Following this, he worked with Ricky Ford, Duke Jordan, Mal Waldron, and Paul Horn. His 1989 album Other Times, Other Places reached No. 11 on the U.S. Billboard Top Jazz Albums chart. He has also played with Chick Corea, Michael Brecker, Stan Getz, Dexter Gordon, Kenny Garrett, and Dizzy Gillespie.

== Personal life ==
Friesen is the younger brother of actress Dyan Cannon, and the uncle of actress Jennifer Grant. He is the son of Ashkenazi Jewish mother Claire (née Portnoy) and Canadian Mennonite father Ben Friesen. He was married to Kirsten Friesen from 1964 until her death in 2002; they had three children. He has since been remarried to Natalie Digtyar, a fashion designer from the Czech Republic.

== Discography ==
=== As leader/co-leader ===
- Color Pool (Muse, 1975)
- Star Dance (Inner City, 1976)
- Waterfall Rainbow (Inner City, 1977)
- Through the Listening Glass (Inner City, 1978)
- Other Mansions (Inner City, 1979)
- Paths Beyond Tracing (SteepleChase, 1980)
- Heart to Heart (Golden Flute, 1980)
- Storyteller (Muse, 1981)
- Yet to Come with Linc Chamberland (Muse, 1981)
- Voices (Westwind, 1983)
- Amber Skies (Palo Alto, 1983)
- Encounters with Mal Waldron (Muse, 1985) – rec. 1984
- Inner Voices (Global Pacific, 1987)
- Other Times, Other Places (Global Pacific, 1989)
- Departure (Global Pacific, 1990)
- Long Trip Home (ITM Pacific, 1992)
- In Concert with Denny Zeitlin (ITM Pacific, 1992) – live
- Two for the Show (ITM Pacific, 1994)
- 1･2･3 (Burnside, 1994)
- The Spirit of Christmas with Jeannie Hoffman (Burnside, 1994)
- Ancient Kings with Airto Moreira, Gary Barone (Shamrock, 1994)
- Returning with Glen Moore (Burnside, 1995)
- Three to Get Ready (Summit, 1995)
- Upon the Swing (Shamrock, 1996)
- Facing the Wind with Leszek Możdżer (Power Bros, 1996)
- Castles and Flags (Shamrock, 1996)
- Still Waters with Ralf Illenberger, Ulrike Dinter (Shamrock, 1997)
- Tomorrow's Dream (Shamrock, 1998)
- Live at Jazz Bakery with Denny Zeitlin (Intuition, 1999) – live rec. 1996
- Grace with Jeff Gardner (Khaeon, 2000)
- Made in Berlin with Uwe Kropinski (ITM, 2001)[DVD-Video]
- With You in Mind with Gary Versace (Summit, 2001)
- Songs of the Night Wind with Ulli Dinter (Dominant Thomastik Infeld, 2001)
- The Name of a Woman (Intuition, 2001)[2CD] – rec. 1999–2000
- Midnight Mood: Live in Stockholm (Intuition, 2004) – live rec. 2002
- Made in Istanbul with Uwe Kropinski (ITM, 2004)
- Connection (ITM, 2006)[2CD] – rec. 2001 & 2005
- Christmas at Woodstock (West Wind, 2006)
- Circle Of Three (ITM, 2009)
- Brilliant Heart (ITM, 2013) – rec. 2012
- Morning Star (Color Pool Music, 2014)
- Where the Light Falls (Origin, 2014)[2CD]
- Bactrian with Glen Moore (Origin, 2015)
- Triple Exposure (Origin, 2016)
- Structures (Origin, 2017)[2CD]
- Another Time Another Place (Rattle, 2017)
- My Faith, My Life (Origin, 2018)[2CD]
- Interaction (Origin, 2019)
- Testimony (Origin, 2020)
- Passage with Bob Ravenscroft (Origin, 2021)
- Day of Rest (Origin, 2021) – rec. 2020

Collaborations
With Eddie Moore, Jim Pepper, Julian Priester and Mal Waldron

- Remembering the Moment (Soul Note, 1994) – live rec. 1987

With John Gross, Gary Barone and Alan Jones

- Four to Go (ITM Pacific, 1996) – rec. 1995

With Christian Hassenstein and Joost Lijbaart

- Textures (DJAMtones, 2014)

=== As sideman ===
With Ted Curson

- Jubilant Power (Inner City, 1976)
- Snake Johnson (Chiaroscuro, 1981) – rec. 1980

With Duke Jordan

- Duke's Artistry (SteepleChase, 1978)
- The Great Session (SteepleChase, 1981) – rec. 1978

With Mal Waldron

- One Entrance, Many Exits (Palo Alto, 1983) – rec. 1982
- Dedication (Soul Note, 1988) – rec. 1985

With others

- Kenny Drew, Ruby, My Dear (SteepleChase, 1980)
- Ricky Ford, Manhattan Plaza (Muse, 1978)
- Billy Harper, Black Saint (Black Saint, 1975)
- Uwe Kropinski, Dancing with the Bass (ITM, 1989)
