= Wait and See (album) =

Live album by Duke Jordan Trio
- Released: 1985
- Recorded: December 16–17, 1978
- Venue: The Tivolis Koncertsal in Copenhagen, Denmark
- Genre: Jazz
- Length: 56:00
- Label: SteepleChase SCS 1211
- Producer: Nils Winther

Duke Jordan chronology
Tivoli Two (1978)	Wait and See (1985)	Solo Masterpieces Vol. 1 (1979)

Wait and See is a live album by pianist Duke Jordan's Trio recorded at the Tivolis Koncertsal and first released on the Danish SteepleChase label in 1985.

== Reception ==
Professional ratings
Review scores
Source	Rating
AllMusic	3/5 stars
The Penguin Guide to Jazz Recordings	2.5/4 stars

AllMusic reviewer Scott Yanow stated "Another excellent bop-oriented Duke Jordan session, one of many for SteepleChase".

== Track listing ==
All compositions by Duke Jordan except as indicated

1. "Love Train" - 7:28
2. "Misty" (Johnny Burke, Erroll Garner) - 7:28
3. "My Heart Skips a Beat" - 7:20
4. "Dancer's Call" - 7:39 Bonus track on CD reissue
5. "The Bullet" - 6:30 Bonus track on CD reissue
6. "Undecided Lady" - 6:13
7. "Wait and See" - 4:31
8. "Out of Nowhere" (Johnny Green, Edward Heyman) - 6:41
9. "Jordu" - 2:10

== Personnel ==
- Duke Jordan - piano
- Wilbur Little - bass
- Dannie Richmond - drums
