= Misty Thursday =

Studio album by Duke Jordan Quartet
- Released: 1976
- Recorded: June 30, 1975 in NYC
- Genre: Jazz
- Length: 55:41 CD with bonus tracks
- Label: SteepleChase SCS 1053
- Producer: Nils Winther

Duke Jordan chronology
Truth (1975)	Misty Thursday (1976)	Duke's Delight (1975)

Misty Thursday is an album led by pianist Duke Jordan recorded in 1975 and released on the Danish SteepleChase label.

== Reception ==
Professional ratings
Review scores
Source	Rating
AllMusic	3/5 stars
The Penguin Guide to Jazz Recordings	2.5/4 stars

AllMusic awarded the album 3 stars.

== Track listing ==
All compositions by Duke Jordan except as indicated

1. "There's a Star for You" - 6:28
2. "Hymn to Peace" - 4:51
3. "Misty Thursday" - 5:56
4. "Night Train from Snekkersten" - 6:20
5. "Jealous Blues" - 5:31
6. "Lady Linda" - 7:46
7. "I'm Gonna Learn Your Style" - 8:55
8. "Hymn to Peace" [Alternate Take] - 4:21 Bonus track on CD release
9. "Night Train from Snekkersten" [Alternate Take] - 5:33 Bonus track on CD release

== Personnel ==
- Duke Jordan - piano
- Chuck Wayne - guitar
- Sam Jones - bass
- Roy Haynes - drums
