= Duke Jordan =

American jazz pianist

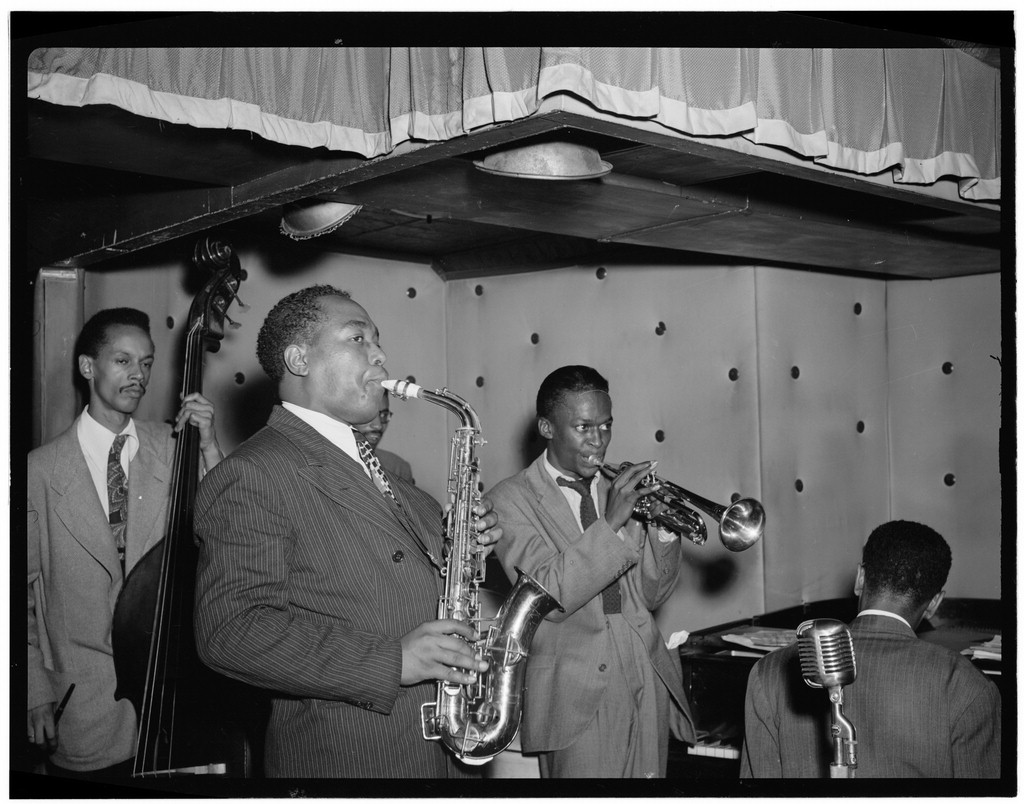
- Jordan (seated), in the Charlie Parker Quintet at the Three Deuces in 1947. (photo William P. Gottlieb)

Background information
- Born: Irving Sidney Jordan; April 1, 1922; Brooklyn, New York, U.S.
- Died: August 8, 2006 (aged 84) Valby, Copenhagen, Denmark
- Genres: Bebop
- Occupation: Musician
- Instrument: Piano
- Labels: Signal, Blue Note, SteepleChase

Irving Sidney "Duke" Jordan (April 1, 1922 – August 8, 2006) was an American jazz pianist.

== Biography ==
Jordan was born in New York and raised in Brooklyn where he attended Boys High School. An imaginative and gifted pianist, Jordan was a regular member of Charlie Parker's quintet during 1947–48, which also featured Miles Davis. He participated in Parker's Dial sessions in late 1947 that produced "Dewey Square", "Bongo Bop", "Bird of Paradise", and the ballad "Embraceable You". These performances are featured on Charlie Parker on Dial.

Jordan had a long solo career from the mid-1950s onwards, although for a period in the mid-1960s he drove a taxi in New York. After periods accompanying Sonny Stitt and Stan Getz, he performed and recorded in the trio format. His composition "Jordu" became a jazz standard when trumpeter Clifford Brown adopted it into his repertoire. Another of his compositions, "No Problem", has been recorded several times, notably by Art Blakey, under the title "No Hay Problema", and Chet Baker as well as others.

Beginning in 1978, he lived in Copenhagen, Denmark, having recorded an extensive sequence of albums for the SteepleChase label; his first record date for the company was in 1973. In the view of some listeners his style did not change over the course of his career.

From 1952 to 1962, he was married to the jazz singer Sheila Jordan. Their union produced a daughter, Tracey J. Jordan. He died in Valby, Copenhagen.

== Discography ==
=== As leader/co-leader ===
Year recorded	Title	Label	Year released	Notes
1954	Jordu	Prestige	1971	Trio, with Gene Ramey (bass), Lee Abrams (drums); includes two 1949 tracks led by Don Lanphere (tenor sax)
1955	Jazz Laboratory Series, Vol. 1	Signal	1955	Some tracks trio, with Oscar Pettiford (bass), Kenny Clarke (drums); some tracks with Gigi Gryce (alto sax) overdubbed
1955	Duke Jordan Trio and Quintet	Signal	1955	Some tracks trio, with Percy Heath (bass), Art Blakey (drums); one track quartet, with Cecil Payne (baritone sax) added; some tracks quintet, with Eddie Bert (trombone) added; reissued by Savoy as Flight to Jordan, but this is different from the 1960 Blue Note album
1959?	Les Liaisons Dangereuses	Charlie Parker	1962	Music from the original soundtrack From the motion picture. One track trio, with Eddie Khan (bass), Art Taylor (drums); most tracks quintet, with Sonny Cohn (trumpet), Charlie Rouse (tenor sax) added
1960	Flight to Jordan	Blue Note	1960	Quintet, with Dizzy Reece (trumpet), Stanley Turrentine (tenor sax), Reggie Workman (bass), Art Taylor (drums)
1962	East and West of Jazz	Charlie Parker	1962	One track quartet, with Johnny Coles (trumpet), Wendell Marshall (bass) Walter Bolden (drums); most tracks quintet, with Cecil Payne (baritone sax) added; album shared with Sadik Hakim
1973	Brooklyn Brothers	Muse	1973	Quartet, with Cecil Payne (baritone sax, flute), Sam Jones (bass), Al Foster (drums)
1973	The Murray Hill Caper	Spotlite	1973	Quartet, with Cecil Payne (baritone sax), David Williams (bass), Al Foster (drums)
1973	Flight to Denmark	SteepleChase	1974	Trio, with Mads Vinding (bass), Ed Thigpen (drums)
1973	Two Loves	SteepleChase	1974	Trio, with Mads Vinding (bass), Ed Thigpen (drums)
1973	Montmartre ´73 featuring Bent Jædig	SteepleChase	2022	Quartet, with Bent Jædig (tenor sax), Allan Gregersen, Johnny Dyani, Eddie Gomez (bass), Jørn Elniff (drums)
1975	Truth	SteepleChase	1983	Trio, with Mads Vinding (bass), Ed Thigpen (drums)
1975	Misty Thursday	SteepleChase	1976	Quartet, with Chuck Wayne (guitar), Sam Jones (bass), Roy Haynes (drums)
1975	Duke's Delight	SteepleChase	1976	One track solo; most tracks quintet, with Richard Williams (trumpet), Charlie Rouse (tenor sax), Sam Jones (bass), Al Foster (drums) added
1975	Lover Man	SteepleChase	1979	Trio, with Sam Jones (bass), Al Foster (drums)
1976	Live in Japan	SteepleChase	1977	Trio, with Wilbur Little (bass), Roy Haynes (drums); in concert
1976	Osaka Concert Vol. 1	SteepleChase	1990	Trio, with Wilbur Little (bass), Roy Haynes (drums); in concert
1976	Osaka Concert Vol. 2	SteepleChase	1990	Trio, with Wilbur Little (bass), Roy Haynes (drums); in concert
1976	Flight to Japan	SteepleChase	1978	Trio, with Wilbur Little (bass), Roy Haynes (drums)
1978	Duke's Artistry	SteepleChase	1978	Quartet, with Art Farmer (flugelhorn), David Friesen (bass), Philly Joe Jones (drums)
1978	The Great Session	SteepleChase	1981	Trio, with David Friesen (bass), Philly Joe Jones (drums)
1978	Flight to Norway	SteepleChase	2003	Trio, with Wilbur Little (bass), Dannie Richmond (drums); in concert
1978	Tivoli One	SteepleChase	1984	Trio, with Wilbur Little (bass), Dannie Richmond (drums); in concert
1978	Tivoli Two	SteepleChase	1984	Trio, with Wilbur Little (bass), Dannie Richmond (drums); in concert
1978	Wait and See	SteepleChase	1985	Trio, with Wilbur Little (bass), Dannie Richmond (drums); in concert
1979	Solo Masterpieces Vol. 1	SteepleChase	1992	Solo piano
1979	Midnight Moonlight	SteepleChase	1980	Solo piano
1979	Change a Pace	SteepleChase	1980	Trio, with Niels-Henning Ørsted Pedersen (bass), Billy Hart (drums)
1978– 1979	Thinking of You	SteepleChase	1982	One track solo piano; most tracks trio, with Niels-Henning Ørsted Pedersen (bass), Billy Hart (drums)
1979	Solo Masterpieces Vol. 2	SteepleChase	1992	Solo piano
1981	Art Pepper with Duke Jordan in Copenhagen 1981	Galaxy	1996	Quartet, with Art Pepper (alto sax, clarinet), David Williams (bass), Carl Burnett (drums); in concert
1982	So Nice Duke	Three Blind Mice	1982	Trio, with Jesper Lundgaard (bass), Aage Tanggaard (drums); in concert
1983	Blue Duke	Baystate (JP)	1983	Trio, with Harry Emmery (bass), James Martin (drums)
1983	Jealousy	Marshmallow	1984	Trio, with Jesper Lundgaard (bass), Ed Thigpen (drums); plus Kristian Jørgensen (violin)
1983	Plays Standards	Marshmallow	1984	Trio, with Jesper Lundgaard (bass), Aage Tanggaard (drums)
1985	Time on My Hands	SteepleChase	1988	Trio, with Jesper Lundgaard (bass), Billy Hart (drums)
1985	As Time Goes By	SteepleChase	1989	Trio, with Jesper Lundgaard (bass), Billy Hart (drums)
1987	Acoustic Live at 3361 Black	3361 Black (JP)	1987	Trio, with Major Holley (bass), Jake Hanna (drums); in concert
1987	Live Live Live	3361 Black (JP)	1987	Trio, with Major Holley (bass), Jake Hanna (drums); in concert
1989	Kiss of Spain	3361 Black (JP)	1989	Trio, with Nobuyoshi Ino (bass), Masahiko Togashi (drums)
1990	Always	Marshmallow	1992	Trio, with Jesper Lundgaard (bass), Ange Tanggaard (drums)
1991	White Key	3361 Black (JP)	1991	Quartet, with Yuka Kido (flute), Chikuhoh (shakuhachi), Hiroshi Yoshino (bass)
1991	Black Key	3361 Black (JP)	1991	Quartet, with Yuka Kido (flute), Chikuhoh (shakuhachi), Hiroshi Yoshino (bass)
1993	One for the Library	Storyville	1994	Solo piano
1994	Live in Paris	Marshmallow	2001	Trio, with Luigi Trussardi (bass), Al Levitt (drums); in concert
1995	Beauty of Scandinavia	Key'stone (JP)	2000	Trio, with Jesper Lundgaard (bass), Ed Thigpen (drums)

Compilations

- When You're Smiling (Steeple Chase, 1996) – combined Time on My Hands (1988) and As Time Goes By (1989) plus ten bonus tracks
- Double Duke (Steeple Chase, 1997) – combined Change a Pace (1980) and Thinking of You (1982) plus five bonus tracks

=== As sideman ===
With Gene Ammons

- The Happy Blues (Prestige, 1956)
- All Star Sessions (Prestige, 1956) – rec. 1950–1955
- Blues Up and Down, Vol. 1 (Prestige, 1970) – rec. 1950

With Eddie Bert

- Eddie Bert (Discovery, 1952)[10"]
- Eddie Bert Quintet (Discovery, 1953)[10"]

With Kenny Burrell

- Blue Lights Vols. 1 & 2 (Blue Note, 1958)
- Swingin' (Blue Note (JP), 1980) – rec. 1958 only

With Stan Getz

- Duke Ellington 25th Anniversary Concert (FDC (It) 1005)
- Getz Age (Roost RLP 2258)
- Hooray for Stan Getz (Session Disc 108)
- Move! (Natasha Imports 4005)
- Sweetie Pie (Philology (It) W 40-2)
- The Complete Roost Recordings (Roost CDP 7243 8 59622-2)
- Stan Getz Plays (Norgran, 1952)
- Stan Getz Quartet (Queen Disc (It) Q 013)
- Live at Carnegie Hall (Fresh Sound (Sp) FSCD 1003)
- Live at the Hi-Hat 1953, Vol. 1 (Fresh Sound (Sp) FSCD 1014)
- Live at the Hi-Hat 1953, Vol. 2 (Fresh Sound (Sp) FSCD 1015)
- That Top Tenor Technician Stan Getz (Alto AL 704)

With Cecil Payne

- Patterns of Jazz (Savoy, 1956)
- Cecil Payne Quartet and Quintet (Signal, 1957)
- Shaw 'Nuff (Charlie Parker, 1961)
- Cecil Payne Performing Charlie Parker Music (Charlie Parker, 1961)
- The Connection (Charlie Parker, 1962)
- Bird Gets The Worm (Muse, 1976)

With Sonny Stitt

- Stitt's Bits (Prestige, 1958) – rec. 1950
- Sonny Stitt & the Top Brass (Atlantic, 1963) – rec. 1962
- The Champ (Muse, 1974) – rec. 1973

With Barney Wilen

- Un Témoin Dans La Ville (Fontana (FR), 1959) – soundtrack for Witness in the City
- Barney (RCA (FR), 1960) – live rec. 1959

With The Birdlanders

- The Birdlanders, Vol. 1 (Period, 1957) – rec. 1954
- The Birdlanders, Vol. 2 (Period, 1957) – rec. 1954
- The Birdlanders, Vol. 3 (Period, 1957) – rec. 1954

With others

- Ernestine Anderson, It's Time for Ernestine (Metronome (SE), 1958)
- Chet Baker, No Problem (SteepleChase, 1980) – rec. 1979
- Paul Bascomb, Bad Bascomb (Delmark, 1976) – rec. 1952
- Art Blakey, Les Liaisons Dangereuses 1960 (Fontana, 1960) – rec. 1959. Original Soundtrack with Barney Wilen.
- Tina Brooks, True Blue (Blue Note, 1960)
- Joe Carroll, "Joe Carroll" (Charlie Parker, 1962)[7"]
- Teddy Edwards, The Inimitable Teddy Edwards (Xanadu, 1976)
- Rolf Ericson, Rolf Ericson and his American All Stars (Metronome (SE) JMLP 2–105, EmArcy MG 36106)
- Art Farmer, Art Farmer Quintet featuring Gigi Gryce (Prestige, 1956) – rec. 1955
- Gigi Gryce, Doin' the Gigi (Uptown, 2011) – compilation
- Coleman Hawkins, Coleman Hawkins and His Orchestra (Crown, 1960)
- Joe Holiday, Holiday for Jazz (Decca DL 8487)
- Howard McGhee, The Return of Howard McGhee (Bethlehem, 1956) – rec. 1955
- Charles McPherson, Beautiful! (Xanadu 115)
- Barry Miles, Miles of Genius (Charlie Parker PLP 804)
- Sam Most, Mostly Flute (Xanadu 133)
- Charlie Parker, Complete Charlie Parker on Dial, Charlie Parker on Dial (Jazz Classics, Spotlite)
- Oscar Pettiford, Oscar Pettiford (Bethlehem, 1954)
- Doug Raney, Introducing Doug Raney (SteepleChase, 1978) – rec. 1977
- Dizzy Reece, Comin' On! (Blue Note, 1999) – rec. 1960
- Louis Smith, Here Comes Louis Smith (Blue Note, 1958)
- Clark Terry, Live at the Wichita Jazz Festival (Vanguard 1974, VSD 79355)
- Doug Watkins, Watkins at Large (Transition TRLP 20)
- Julius Watkins, Julius Watkins Sextet (Blue Note, 1995) – rec. 1954–1955
- Teddy Williams, Touch of the Blues c/w Dumb Woman Blues (Prestige 715)

Various Artists

- Birds Night: A Night at the Five Spot (Signal S 1204) Savoy (1958) (Savoy Jazz 2 LPs Celebration of Music of Charlie Parker)
- International Jam Sessions (Xanadu 122)
- Lestorian Mode (Savoy MG 12105)
- The Piano Players (Xanadu 171)
- Birdology vols. 1&2 (Birdology, Verve 1990 CDs)
