= Uwe Kropinski =

German jazz guitarist and composer

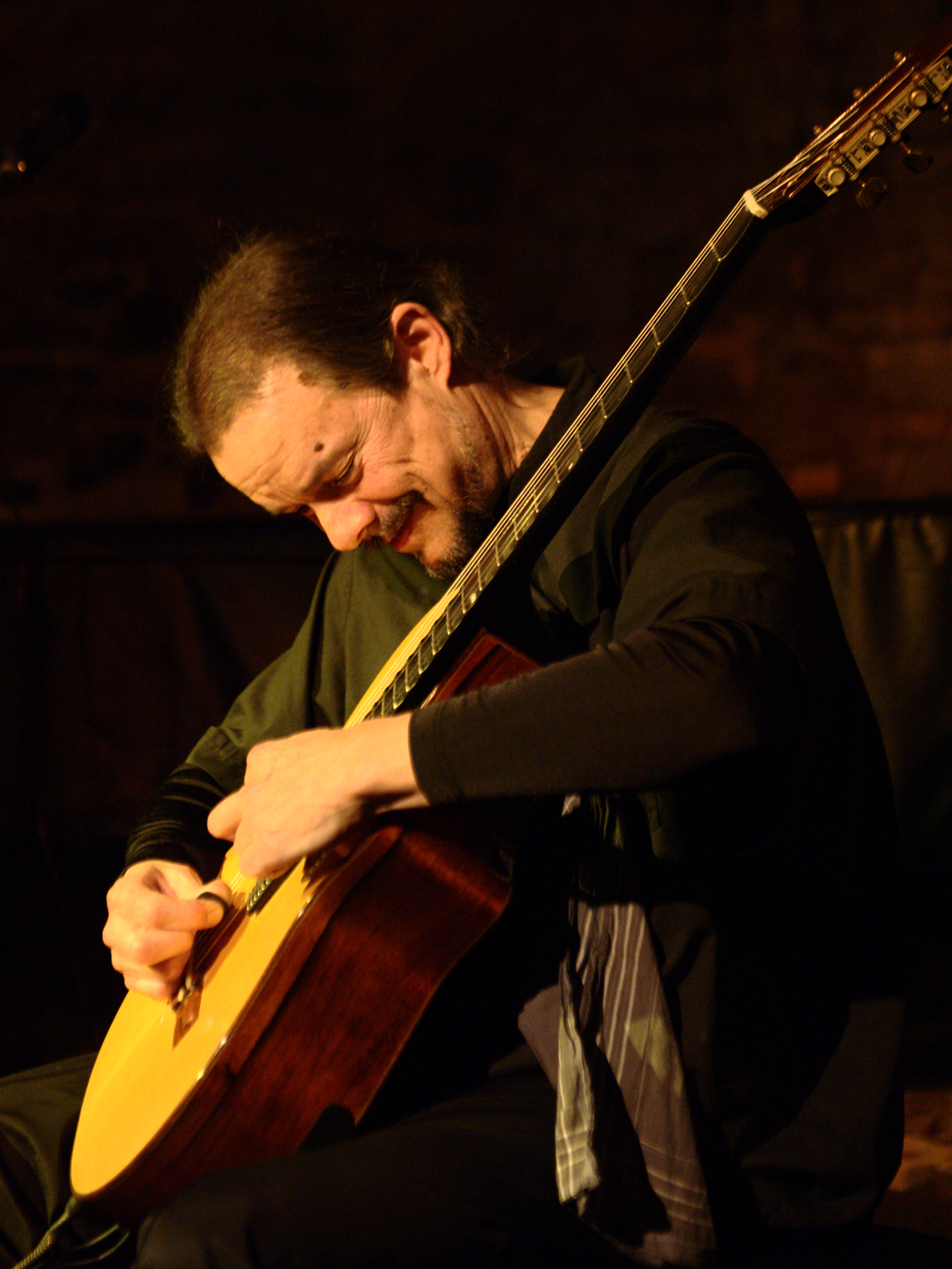
- Uwe Kropinski in 2012

Background information
- Born: February 20, 1952 (age 74); East Berlin, East Germany
- Genres: Jazz, Avant-garde jazz
- Occupations: Musician, composer
- Instrument: Guitar
- Years active: 1977-present
- Website: Official website

Uwe Kropinski is a German jazz guitarist and composer. Having started his career during the 1970s and 1980s in East Germany, he is known for his work in the genres of avant-garde jazz and improvised acoustic guitar playing.

== Life and career ==
Born in former East Berlin, Kropinski started out as a rock musician in 1966, playing in a highschool band in Treptow. From 1973 to 1976, he studied jazz and classical guitar at the Hochschule für Musik "Hanns Eisler". He began his concert career playing free jazz and improvised music in 1977 and was a member of various East German jazz formations until 1986. Among others, he played with trombone player Conny Bauer and other leading jazz musicians in the GDR. Further, Kropinski founded a quartet with Volker Schlott on saxophone, Günter Bartel on bass and Peter Gröning on drums. Other partners of his were Günter "Baby" Sommer and Adelhard Roidinger.

In 1986, after a concert in Bavaria, Kropinski did not return to East Germany and initially lived in Nuremberg, later in Cologne. In 1993 he and flautist Michael Heupel were invited by the Goethe-Institute on a tour to Africa. On this tour, they visited six countries in six weeks: Sudan, Kenya, Tanzania, Madagascar, Zimbabwe, and Ethiopia. Back home, Kropinski and Heupel recorded the album African Notebook.

Kropinski first travelled to the U.S. to play with Portland bass player David Friesen in 1988 and since then has continued this cooperation in numerous concerts both in the U.S. and Europe. Since then, he has also played with musicians such as Moroccan ethno-jazz musician Majid Bekkas, Jamaaladeen Tacuma, John Stowell, Cecil McBee, and Pheeroan Aklaff. In Germany, he has performed with pianist Joachim Kühn, clarinette player Rolf Kühn and pianist Dieter Köhnlein, among others. Following German reunification, Kropinski moved back to Berlin in 1998.

Since 1989 Kropinski has played his custom-made guitars with 39 frets, one with steel and one with nylon strings, made by Dutch guitar maker Theo Scharpach. He uses these guitars for his personal playing techniques, at times also for percussion. In addition to his concert activities, Kropinski has been teaching improvisation workshops. Further, he has composed numerous works, published in cooperation with David Friesen.

Kropinski has been described by All about Jazz as "a hard musician to classify with forays into classical technique, avant-garde musings, folk-like thematic material and even vocalizing and percussive effects."

== Discography ==
- Solo (Amiga, 1985)
- So Oder So (ITM, 1987)
- Dancing with the Bass (ITM, 1989)
- By the Way with Dieter Köhnlein (Aho, 1989)
- Departure with David Friesen (Global Pacific, 1990)
- Berlin Concert Live (ITM, 1991)
- Guitar Guitar (ITM, 1991)
- First Time in Manhattan with Cecil McBee and Pheeroan Aklaff (ITM, 1993)
- In und um C with Dieter Köhnlein (ITM, 1996)
- Dinner for Two with Volker Schlott (Acoustic Music, 1994)
- African Notebook with Michael Heupel (Aho, 1996)
- Faces (ITM, 1997)
- Picture in Black and White with John Stowell (Acoustic Music, 1997)
- Made in Berlin with David Friesen (ITM, 1999)
- Stringed Together with Dieter Köhnlein (ITM, 2002)
- Made in Istanbul with David Friesen (ITM, 2004)
- American Dream (Acoustic Music, 2005)
- Sentimental Moods with Michael Heupel (ITM, 2005)
- Universal Language (Self-released, 2006)
- Made with Friends with David Friesen (Jazzwerkstatt, 2007)
- Hey Joe Hey Uwe with Joe Sachse (Jazzwerkstatt, 2008)
- Marula in All with Michael Heupel, Majid Bekkas, Aly Keïta (Morgenland Records, 2008)
- Zwei with Jamaaladeen Tacuma (Jazzwerkstatt, 2009)
- Gallery born (Kunstraum Heiddorf, 2015)
- Scratching the Silence with Dieter Köhnlein (2015)
- Blätter aus dem Garten der Schubartin with Ludwig Schumann (2015)
- A Kind of Now with Michael Heupel (Jazzwerkstatt 2018)
- Instant stories with Dieter Köhnlein (2022)

== Literature ==
- Bundesstiftung zur Aufarbeitung der SED-Diktatur (ed.). "Kropinski, Uwe". www.bundesstiftung-aufarbeitung.de (in German).
- Bush, Andre (2011-11-14). Modern Jazz Guitar Styles. Mel Bay Publications. ISBN 978-1-61065-830-0.
- Kaldewey, Helma (2020). A People's Music: Jazz in East Germany, 1945–1990. Cambridge University Press. pp. 222–223. ISBN 978-1-108-48618-7.
