= Live in Japan (Duke Jordan album) =

Live album by Duke Jordan Trio
- Released: 1977
- Recorded: September 20, 1976
- Venue: Denki Hall, Fukuoka, Japan
- Genre: Jazz
- Label: SteepleChase SCS 1063/64
- Producer: Nils Winther

Duke Jordan chronology
Lover Man (1975)	Live in Japan (1977)	Osaka Concert Vol. 1 (1976)

Live in Japan is a live album by pianist Duke Jordan's Trio recorded on their 1976 Japanese Tour and first released on the Danish SteepleChase label as a double LP in 1977 then as two separate volumes on CD with additional material in 1994.

== Reception ==
Professional ratings
Review scores
Source	Rating
AllMusic	3/5 stars

AllMusic rated the album with 3 stars.

== Track listing ==
All compositions by Duke Jordan except as indicated

1. "I'll Remember April" (Gene de Paul, Patricia Johnston, Don Raye) - 3:17 Bonus track on Vol. 1 CD release
2. "Flight to Jordan" - 6:10
3. "Forecast" - 6:40
4. "Paula" - 3:25
5. "There's a Star for You" - 7:17 Bonus track on Vol. 1 CD release
6. "Bluebird" (Charlie Parker) - 5:55
7. "Misty Thursday" - 5:40
8. "W'utless" - 5:35
9. "Scotch Blues" - 6:45
10. "Jordu" - 5:55
11. "Two Loves" - 3:15
12. "(In My) Solitude" (Duke Ellington, Eddie DeLange, Irving Mills) - 3:30
13. "No Problem" - 9:10
14. "Cold Bordeaux Blues" - 6:45
15. "Tall Grass" - 4:05
16. "I'm Gonna Learn Your Style" - 4:10
17. "Embraceable You" (George Gershwin, Ira Gershwin) - 4:40
18. "Night Train from Snekkersten" - 6:10
19. "Cherokee" (Ray Noble) - 9:22 Bonus track on Vol. 2 CD release
20. "Jordu" - 2:25
21. "Flight to Japan" - 1:40

== Personnel ==
- Duke Jordan - piano
- Wilbur Little - bass
- Roy Haynes - drums
