= Duke Jordan Trio and Quintet =

Studio album by Duke Jordan
- Released: 1955
- Recorded: October 10 and November 20, 1955
- Studio: Van Gelder Studio, Hackensack, New Jersey
- Genre: Jazz
- Length: 44:35
- Label: Signal; S 1202
- Producer: Don Schlitten

Duke Jordan chronology
Jazz Laboratory Series, Vol. 1 (1955)	Duke Jordan Trio and Quintet (1955)	Flight to Jordan (1960)

Duke Jordan Trio and Quintet is an album by American pianist Duke Jordan recorded in 1955 and first released on Don Schlitten's Signal label before being acquired by the Savoy label.

== Reception ==
Professional ratings
Review scores
Source	Rating
Allmusic	3/5 stars

The Allmusic review by Jim Todd stated: "The title of this 1955 Savoy release by pianist Duke Jordan succinctly points to the set's merits and shortcomings. The five trio performances with Art Blakey (drums) and Percy Heath (bass) work well. The five tracks from the same group augmented by Cecil Payne (baritone sax) and Eddie Bert (trombone) don't come up to the mark".

== Track listing ==
All compositions by Duke Jordan, except as indicated

1. "Forecast" - 4:50
2. "Sultry Eve" - 3:56
3. "They Can't Take That Away from Me" (George Gershwin, Ira Gershwin) - 4:34
4. "A Night in Tunisia" (Dizzy Gillespie, Frank Paparelli) - 5:09
5. "Summertime" (G. Gershwin, I. Gershwin, DuBose Heyward) - 4:24
6. "Flight to Jordan" - 4:42
7. "Two Lovers" - 3:07
8. "Cu-Ba" (Cecil Payne) - 3:31
9. "Yesterdays" (Otto Harbach, Jerome Kern) - 5:45
10. "Scotch Blues" - 4:33
- Recorded at the Van Gelder Studio, Hackensack, New Jersey on October 10 (tracks 1–5) and November 20 (tracks 6–10), 1955.

== Personnel ==
- Duke Jordan - piano
- Eddie Bert - trombone (tracks 6–8 & 10)
- Cecil Payne - baritone saxophone (tracks 6–10)
- Percy Heath - bass
- Art Blakey - drums
