= Mads Vinding =

Danish jazz double-bassist

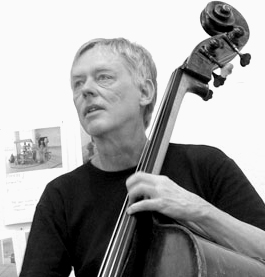

Background information
- Born: December 7, 1948; Copenhagen, Denmark
- Genres: Jazz, classical
- Occupations: Musician, composer
- Instrument: Double bass
- Years active: 1960s–present
- Labels: Sonet, Stunt
- Website: www.vinding.dk

Mads Vinding (born 7 December 1948, Copenhagen, Denmark) is a Danish jazz double-bassist.

== Music career ==
Vinding began his professional career when he was 16 as the house bassist for Jazzhus Montmartre, a jazz club in Copenhagen. He has played on more than 800 recordings and more than 1000 Radio/TV shows.

== Awards ==
- Best soloist, Nordring, 1978
- Ben Webster Prize, 1982
- Palæ Jazz Prize, 1997
- Launy Grøndahl's honorary prize, 2000
- Django d’Or, 2007

== Gallery ==
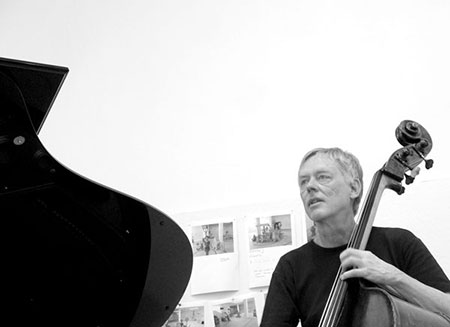

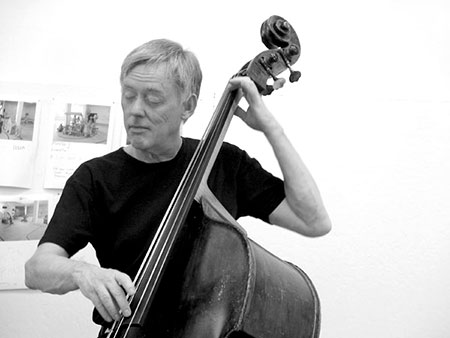

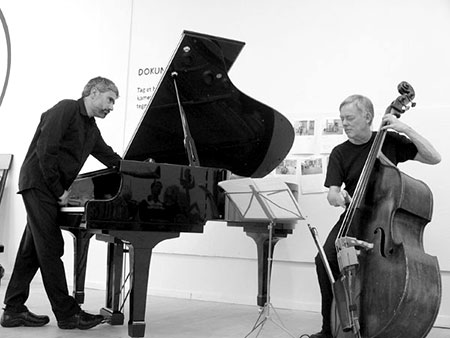

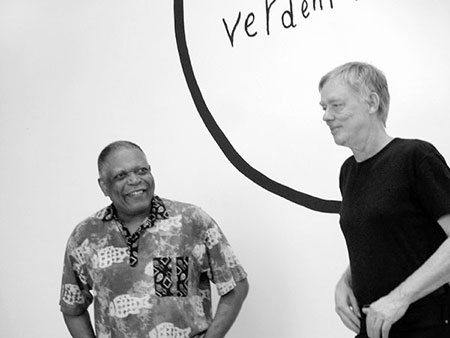

== Discography ==
- Mads Vinding Group (Cosmos Collector, 1977)
- The Kingdom (Stunt, 1998)
- Daddio Don (Stunt, 2000)
- Six Hands Three Minds One Heart (Stunt, 2002)
- Over the Rainbow (Cope, 2002)
- Two Basses (ZYX/Touche/Weaving, 2005)
- Abrikostræet (Calibrated, 2005)
- In Our Own Sweet Way (Storyville, 2009)
- Open Minds (Storyville, 2011)
- Composing (Storyville, 2015)
- Yesterdays (Stunt, 2017)

=== As sideman ===
With Yelena Eckemoff

- Cold Sun (L & H, 2010)
- Grass Catching the Wind (L & H, 2010)

With Kenny Drew

- Your Soft Eyes (Soul Note, 1981)

With Art Farmer

- Manhattan (Soul Note, 1981)

With Johnny Griffin

- Blues for Harvey (SteepleChase, 1973)

With Hank Jones

- Trio (Storyville, 1991)
- Hank Jones in Copenhagen - Live at Jazzhus Slukefter 1983 (Storyville, 2018) - trio with Shelly Manne, drums

With Duke Jordan

- Flight to Denmark (SteepleChase, 1974) - recorded in 1973
- Two Loves (SteepleChase, 1975) - recorded in 1973
- Truth (SteepleChase, 1983) - recorded in 1975

With Doug Raney

- Guitar Guitar Guitar (SteepleChase, 1985)

With Idrees Sulieman

- Groovin' (SteepleChase, 1985)

With Kai Winding and Curtis Fuller

- Giant Bones '80 (Sonet, 1980)
