= Senyah =

Studio album by Roy Haynes
- Released: 1972
- Recorded: 1972
- Genre: Hard bop; jazz rock
- Length: 30:55
- Label: Mainstream; MRL 351
- Producer: Bob Shad

Roy Haynes chronology
Hip Ensemble (1971)	Senyah (1972)	Booty (1974)

Senyah is an album recorded by American drummer Roy Haynes in 1972 for the Mainstream label.

== Reception ==
Professional ratings
Review scores
Source	Rating
AllMusic	4/5 stars

AllMusic awarded the album 4 stars and its review by Ron Wynn states "This set is a burner, featuring Haynes in an entirely new light".

== Track listing ==
All compositions by Roy Haynes except as indicated

1. "Sillie Willie" (George Adams) – 7:48
2. "Little Titan" (Marvin Peterson) – 7:22
3. "Senyah" (Joe Bonner) – 5:30
4. "Full Moon" (Adams) – 6:14
5. "Brujeria con Salsa" – 4:01

== Personnel ==
- Roy Haynes – drums, timpani
- Marvin Peterson – trumpet
- George Adams – tenor saxophone
- Carl Schroeder – piano
- Roland Prince – guitar
- Don Pate – bass
- Lawrence Killian – congas
