= Cracklin' =

Studio album by Roy Haynes with Booker Ervin
- Released: July 1963
- Recorded: April 6, 1963
- Studio: Van Gelder Studio, Englewood Cliffs, New Jersey
- Genre: Jazz, hard bop
- Length: 40:53
- Label: New Jazz; NJLP 8286
- Producer: Ozzie Cadena

Roy Haynes chronology
Out of the Afternoon (1962)	Cracklin' (1963)	Cymbalism (1963)

Cracklin' is an album recorded by American jazz drummer Roy Haynes with tenor saxophonist Booker Ervin and released in July 1963 by Prestige Records. The two tracks written by pianist Ronnie Mathews–"Honeydew" and "Dorian"– were also released on single by the parent Prestige label.

== Reception ==
Professional ratings
Review scores
Source	Rating
Allmusic	4/5 stars
The Penguin Guide to Jazz Recordings	3/4 stars

Allmusic awarded the album 4 stars stating: "Most of drummer Roy Haynes' dates as a leader put the focus on a star soloist... Ervin's unique sound, soulful yet very advanced, is well showcased".

== Track listing ==
1. "Scoochie" (Booker Ervin) – 5:53
2. "Dorian" (Ronnie Mathews) – 6:48
3. "Sketch of Melba" (Randy Weston) – 7:37
4. "Honeydew" (Mathews) – 3:46
5. "Under Paris Skies" (Hubert Giraud) – 7:40
6. "Bad News Blues" (Roy Haynes) – 6:49

== Personnel ==
- Roy Haynes – drums
- Booker Ervin – tenor saxophone
- Ronnie Mathews – piano
- Larry Ridley – bass
