= We Three (jazz album) =

Studio album by Roy Haynes with Phineas Newborn and Paul Chambers
- Released: May 1959
- Recorded: November 14, 1958
- Studios: Van Gelder Studio, Hackensack, New Jersey
- Genre: Jazz
- Length: 39:29
- Labels: New Jazz; NJLP 8210
- Producer: Esmond Edwards

Roy Haynes chronology
Jazz Abroad (1956)	We Three (1959)	Just Us (1960)

We Three is an album by the American jazz drummer Roy Haynes, pianist Phineas Newborn, and bassist Paul Chambers. It was recorded in November 1958 and released through the New Jazz label in May 1959.

== Reception ==
Professional ratings
Review scores
Source	Rating
AllMusic	4.5/5 stars
The Penguin Guide to Jazz Recordings	3/4 stars

AllMusic stated: "This trio had a brief recording career together, but as this solid set shows, they made the best of it."

== Track listing ==
1. "Reflection" (Ray Bryant) - 4:24
2. "Sugar Ray" (Phineas Newborn, Jr.) - 6:25
3. "Solitaire" (King Guion, Carl Nutter, Renee Borek) - 8:54
4. "After Hours" (Avery Parrish) - 11:21
5. "Sneakin' Around" (Bryant) - 4:24
6. "Our Delight" (Tadd Dameron) - 4:01

== Personnel ==
- Roy Haynes - drums
- Phineas Newborn Jr. - piano
- Paul Chambers - bass
