= Out of the Afternoon =

Studio album by Roy Haynes
- Released: July or August 1962
- Recorded: May 16 & 23, 1962
- Studio: Van Gelder Studio, Englewood Cliffs, New Jersey
- Genre: Post-bop, modal jazz
- Length: 37:33
- Label: Impulse!
- Producer: Bob Thiele

Roy Haynes chronology
Just Us (1960)	Out of the Afternoon (1962)	Cracklin' (1962)

Professional ratings
Review scores
Source	Rating
Allmusic	4.5/5 stars
Down Beat	4.5/5 stars
New Record Mirror	3/5 stars
The Rolling Stone Jazz Record Guide	4/5 stars
The Penguin Guide to Jazz Recordings	3.5/4 stars

Out of the Afternoon is an album by jazz drummer Roy Haynes, released in the summer of 1962 on Impulse! Records. It features multi-instrumentalist Roland Kirk among the musicians in Haynes' quartet.

== Track listing ==
1. "Moon Ray" (Artie Shaw, Paul Madison, Arthur Quenzer) – 6:41
2. "Fly Me to the Moon (In Other Words)" (Bart Howard) – 6:40
3. "Raoul" (Haynes) – 6:01
4. "Snap Crackle" (Haynes) – 4:11
5. "If I Should Lose You" (Leo Robin, Ralph Rainger) – 5:49
6. "Long Wharf" (Haynes) – 4:42
7. "Some Other Spring" (Arthur Herzog Jr., Irene Kitchings) – 3:39

== Personnel ==
- Roland Kirk - tenor saxophone, manzello, stritch, C flute, nose flute
- Tommy Flanagan - piano
- Henry Grimes - bass
- Roy Haynes - drums

== In popular culture ==
The album's song "Snap Crackle" was featured in the soundtrack of the video game Grand Theft Auto IV, from the fictional in-game jazz music radio station "JNR 108.5 (Jazz Nation Radio)" in which Haynes himself is the DJ of that station.
