= Vistalite (album) =

Studio album by Roy Haynes
- Released: 1979
- Recorded: July 12 and 20, 1977
- Studio: Fantasy Studios, Berkeley, CA
- Genre: Jazz
- Label: Galaxy; GXY-5116
- Producer: Ed Michel

Roy Haynes chronology
Thank You Thank You (1977)	Vistalite (1979)	Trio Music (1982)

Vistalite is an album by drummer Roy Haynes, recorded in 1977 and released on the Galaxy label.

== Reception ==
Professional ratings
Review scores
Source	Rating
AllMusic	2.5/5 stars
DownBeat	2.5/5 stars

The Bay State Banner wrote that Hayne's "subtle accompaniment, pacing, and solos, are magnificent, and it's also great to hear Joe Henderson on tenor sax sound like he cares again."

The AllMusic review by Scott Yanow called it "an interesting but sometimes uncomfortable mixture of advanced hard bop with electric instruments, aspects of funk, and the influence in spots of the avant-garde" and stated "None of the group originals are all that memorable either, making this date a slight disappointment".

== Track listing ==
1. "Vistalite" (Roy Haynes) – 5:55
2. "More Pain Than Purpose" (Stanley Cowell) – 5:42
3. "Wonderin'" (Cecil McBee) – 4:06
4. "Venus Eyes" (John Stubbledfield) – 4:39
5. "Rok Out" (Marcus Fiorillo) – 6:32
6. "Water Children" (Kenneth Nash) – 6:42
7. "Invitation" (Bronisław Kaper, Paul Francis Webster) – 6:02

== Personnel ==
- Roy Haynes – drums
- Ricardo Strobert – alto saxophone, flute (tracks 1, 2, 4 & 5)
- Joe Henderson – tenor saxophone (tracks 1, 2, 5 & 7)
- Stanley Cowell (tracks 1–4 & 7), George Cables (tracks 3 & 6) – piano, electric piano
- Milcho Leviev – electric piano (track 6)
- Marcus Fiorillo – guitar (tracks 1–6)
- Cecil McBee – bass (tracks 3 & 6)
- Dave Jackson – electric bass (tracks 1, 2, 4, 5 & 7)
- Kenneth Nash – percussion, tambourine (tracks 1 & 3–6)
