= Cymbalism =

Studio album by Roy Haynes
- Released: 1963
- Recorded: September 10, 1963
- Studio: Van Gelder Studio, Englewood Cliffs, New Jersey
- Genre: Jazz
- Length: 37:00
- Label: New Jazz; NJLP 8287
- Producer: Ozzie Cadena

Roy Haynes chronology
Cracklin' (1963)	Cymbalism (1963)	People (1964)

Cymbalism is an album recorded by American drummer Roy Haynes in 1963 for the New Jazz label.

== Reception ==
Professional ratings
Review scores
Source	Rating
AllMusic	3/5 stars
The Penguin Guide to Jazz Recordings	3/4 stars

AllMusic awarded the album 3 stars and its review by Alex Henderson states "it's a pleasing, well-rounded effort that deserves credit for diversity".

== Track listing ==
1. "Modette" (Frank Strozier) – 9:47
2. "I'm Getting Sentimental Over You" (George Bassman, Ned Washington) – 5:36
3. "Go 'n' Git It!" (Ronnie Mathews) – 3:52
4. "La Palomeinding" (Strozier) – 6:40
5. "Medley: Hag/Cymbalism/Oleo" (Strozier/Roy Haynes, Richard Wyands/Sonny Rollins) – 11:05

== Personnel ==
- Roy Haynes – drums
- Frank Strozier – alto saxophone, flute
- Ronnie Mathews – piano
- Larry Ridley – bass
