= Two for the Show (David Friesen album) =

Two for the Show is a 1994 album by David Friesen.

== Track listing ==
1. "Airegin" - (04:56) Friesen / Michael Brecker
2. "True Blue" - (07:48) Friesen / John Scofield
3. "I Want To Be Happy" - (02:55) Friesen / Clark Terry
4. "In Times Past" - (07:12) Friesen / Denny Zeitlin
5. "Alone Together" - (04:46) Friesen / Bud Shank
6. "On The Road With Jazz" - (04:53) Friesen / Uwe Kropinski
7. "Signs And Wonders" - (06:04) Friesen / Michael Brecker
8. "Old Folks" - (06:15) Friesen / John Scofield
9. "Breeze" - (05:18) Friesen / Clark Terry
10. "Maybe In Spring" - (07:46) Friesen / Denny Zeitlin
11. "Double Take" - (03:14) Friesen / Bud Shank
12. "Pianola" - (04:10) Friesen / Uwe Kropinski
