= Hip Ensemble =

Studio album by Roy Haynes
- Released: 1971
- Recorded: 1971
- Genre: Jazz
- Length: 34:44
- Label: Mainstream; MRL 313
- Producer: Bob Shad

Roy Haynes chronology
People (1964)	Hip Ensemble (1971)	Senyah (1972)

Hip Ensemble is an album recorded by American drummer Roy Haynes in 1971 for the Mainstream label.

== Reception ==
Professional ratings
Review scores
Source	Rating
AllMusic	4/5 stars

AllMusic awarded the album 4 stars and its review by Ron Wynn states "This explosive session helped cement the reputations of George Adams and Hannibal Marvin Peterson".

== Track listing ==
All compositions by Roy Haynes except as indicated

1. "Equipoise" (Stanley Cowell) - 4:18
2. "I'm So High" - 4:10
3. "Tangiers" - 5:59
4. "Nothing Ever Changes My Love for You" (Marvin Fisher, Jack Segal) - 4:13
5. "Satan's Mysterious Feeling" (George Adams) - 6:38
6. "You Name It/List Ev'ry Voice and Sing" (Adams/James Weldon Johnson, John Rosamond Johnson) - 9:26

== Personnel ==
- Roy Haynes - drums, timpani
- Marvin Peterson - trumpet
- George Adams - tenor saxophone, flute
- Carl Schroeder - piano
- Teruo Nakamura - bass
- Mervin Bronson - Fender bass
- Lawrence Killian - congas
- Elwood Johnson - bongos, tambourine
