= Just Us (Roy Haynes album) =

Studio album by The Roy Haynes Trio
- Released: 1960
- Recorded: July 5, 1960
- Studios: Van Gelder Studio, Englewood Cliffs, New Jersey
- Genre: Jazz
- Length: 40:53
- Labels: New Jazz; NJLP 8245
- Producer: Esmond Edwards

Roy Haynes chronology
We Three (1959)	Just Us (1960)	Out of the Afternoon (1962)

Just Us is an album recorded by the American drummer Roy Haynes's Trio in 1960 for the New Jazz label.

== Reception ==
Professional ratings
Review scores
Source	Rating
Allmusic	3/5 stars

Allmusic awarded the album 3 stars stating "Haynes' concise drum solos always hold one's interest, and even though this tasteful date is far from definitive, the music is enjoyable".

== Track listing ==
1. "Down Home" (Curtis Fuller) - 7:26
2. "Sweet and Lovely" (Gus Arnheim, Harry Tobias, Jules LeMare) - 6:56
3. "As Long as There's Music" (Sammy Cahn, Jule Styne) - 3:43
4. "Well Now" (Haynes) - 1:56
5. "Cymbalism" (Roy Haynes, Richard Wyands) - 7:00
6. "Con Alma" (Dizzy Gillespie) - 6:31
7. "Speak Low" (Ogden Nash, Kurt Weill) - 7:03

== Personnel ==
- Roy Haynes - drums
- Richard Wyands - piano
- Eddie De Haas - bass
