= Flight to Jordan =

Studio album by Duke Jordan
- Released: 1960
- Recorded: August 4, 1960
- Studio: Van Gelder Studio, Englewood Cliffs, NJ
- Genre: Jazz
- Length: 48:01
- Label: Blue Note; BLP 4046
- Producer: Alfred Lion

Duke Jordan chronology
| Duke Jordan Trio and Quintet (1955) | Flight to Jordan (1960) | Les Liaisons Dangereuses (1962) |

Flight to Jordan is an album by American pianist Duke Jordan recorded in 1960 and released on the Blue Note label.

== Reception ==
Professional ratings
Review scores
| Source | Rating |
|---|---|
| Allmusic | 5/5 stars |
| The Penguin Guide to Jazz Recordings | 3/4 stars |

The Allmusic review by Scott Yanow awarded the album 5 stars and stated "the music has plenty of strong melodies and variety. This is one of Duke Jordan's better recordings and is quite enjoyable".

== Track listing ==
All compositions by Duke Jordan except as indicated

1. "Flight to Jordan" - 5:32
2. "Star Brite" - 7:49
3. "Squawkin'" - 5:00
4. "Deacon Joe" - 8:43
5. "Split Quick" - 5:11
6. "Si-Joya" (No Problem) - 6:46
7. "Diamond Stud" - 5:04 Bonus track on CD reissue
8. "I Should Care" (Sammy Cahn, Axel Stordahl, Paul Weston) - 3:49 Bonus track on CD reissue
- Recorded at Van Gelder Studio, Englewood Cliffs, New Jersey on August 4, 1960.

== Personnel ==
- Duke Jordan - piano - solo track 8
- Dizzy Reece - trumpet
- Stanley Turrentine - tenor saxophone
- Reggie Workman - bass
- Art Taylor - drums

== Charts ==
Chart performance for Flight to Jordan
| Chart (2026) | Peak position |
|---|---|
| Greek Albums (IFPI) | 57 |
