= Birds of a Feather (Roy Haynes album) =

Birds of a Feather: A Tribute to Charlie Parker

Studio album by Roy Haynes
- Released: September 11, 2001
- Recorded: March 26–27, 2001
- Studio: Clinton Recording Studio, NYC
- Genre: Jazz
- Label: Dreyfus Jazz
- Producer: Roy Haynes & Don Sickler

Roy Haynes chronology
The Roy Haynes Trio (1998)	Birds of a Feather: A Tribute to Charlie Parker (2001)	Love Letters (2003)

Birds of a Feather: A Tribute to Charlie Parker is a studio album by Roy Haynes released in 2001 by Dreyfus Jazz.

== Reception ==
Professional ratings
Review scores
Source	Rating
AllMusic	3/5 stars
The Penguin Guide to Jazz Recordings	3/4 stars

The album received Grammy Award nominations in the Best Jazz Instrumental Album category.

In a review for AllMusic, David R. Adler stated that the album "comes across as a casual blowing date, albeit an illustrious and sometimes surprising one."

C. Michael Bailey of All About Jazz wrote: "Birds of a Feather is no hallow tribute. It is a necessary... reconsideration of the Parker Canon, with everybody smiling."

Writing for JazzTimes, Harvey Siders commented: "it comes as no surprise that Haynes is in complete control of a combo that thrives on no-nonsense hard bop... Like their leader, all of the musicians on Birds of a Feather are hard-driving, take-no-prisoners players, perfect for the material they’re working with."

A reviewer for PopMatters noted that the album "shows that there is still a need for a fresh perspective on familiar territory," and stated that Haynes "has assembled a collection of musicians who are genuinely intrigued by the prospect of conversing and sharing, immersing themselves in what Charlie Parker, and the music that represents him on this disc, has come to mean to their art."

== Track listing ==
No.	Title	Writer(s)	Length
1.	"Diverse"	Charlie Parker	5:20
2.	"Ah Leu Cha"	Charlie Parker	5:14
3.	"April In Paris"	Yip Harburg, Vernon Duke	5:14
4.	"Moose The Mooche"	Charlie Parker	5:40
5.	"Now's The Time"	Charlie Parker	6:05
6.	"Rocker"	Gerry Mulligan	6:02
7.	"Barbados"	Charlie Parker	5:03
8.	"Yarbird Suite"	Charlie Parker	4:48
9.	"The Gypsy"	Billy Reid	6:44
10.	"My Heart Belongs To Daddy"	Cole Porter	7:02
11.	"What Is This Thing Called Love"	Cole Porter	7:24

== Personnel ==
Musicians

- Roy Haynes – drums
- Kenny Garrett – alto saxophone
- Roy Hargrove – trumpet
- Dave Holland – bass
- David Kikoski – piano

Production

- Roy Haynes – producer
- Don Sickler – producer
- Alan Bergman – executive producer
- Douglas Yoel – executive producer
- Troy Halderson – engineer
- Gene Paul – engineer (mastering)
- Jim Anderson – engineer (mixing)
- 27.12 Design Ltd. – design
- Ching Ming Cheung – photography
