= Thank You Thank You =

Studio album by Roy Haynes
- Released: 1977
- Recorded: July 16, 18 & 20, 1977
- Studio: Fantasy Studios, Berkeley, CA
- Genre: Jazz
- Length: 39:24
- Label: Galaxy; GXY-5103
- Producer: Ed Michel

Roy Haynes chronology
Sugar Roy (1976)	Thank You Thank You (1977)	Vistalite (1978)

Thank You Thank You is an album by drummer Roy Haynes, recorded in 1977 and released on the Galaxy label.

== Reception ==
Professional ratings
Review scores
Source	Rating
AllMusic	3/5 stars
DownBeat	4/5 stars

The AllMusic review by Scott Yanow stated: "This somewhat obscure outing features Haynes in a variety of settings... The music ranges from poppish to more straightahead with plenty of diverse moods explored".

== Track listing ==
1. "Thank You Thank You" (George Cables) – 7:01
2. "Bullfight" (Roy Haynes) – 11:08
3. "Quiet Fire" (Cables) – 8:14
4. "Processional" (Kenneth Nash, Roy Haynes) – 5:24
5. "Sweet Song" (Stanley Cowell) – 6:19

== Personnel ==
- Roy Haynes – drums
- John Klemmer – tenor saxophone (track 1)
- Stanley Cowell (tracks 2 & 5), George Cables (tracks 1 & 3) – piano, electric piano
- Milcho Leviev – piano (track 2)
- Bobby Hutcherson – vibraphone (tracks 1, 2 & 5)
- Marcus Fiorillo – guitar (track 2)
- Ron Carter (track 1), Cecil McBee (tracks 2, 3 & 5) – bass
- Kenneth Nash – percussion (tracks 2–4)
