= Time on My Hands (Duke Jordan album) =

Studio album by Duke Jordan Trio
- Released: 1988
- Recorded: July 29, 1985, in Copenhagen, Denmark; Bonus tracks recorded January–February 1979
- Genre: Jazz
- Length: 60:03; CD reissue with 5 bonus tracks
- Label: SteepleChase SCS 1232
- Producer: Nils Winther

Duke Jordan chronology
Chocolate Shake (1985)	Time on My Hands (1988)	As Time Goes By (1985)

Time on My Hands is an album by pianist Duke Jordan recorded in 1985 and released on the Danish SteepleChase label.

== Reception ==
Professional ratings
Review scores
Source	Rating
AllMusic	3/5 stars

AllMusic awarded the album 3 stars.

== Track listing ==
1. "Rosetta" (Earl Hines, Henri Woode) - 5:31
2. "If I Did - Would You?" (Duke Jordan) - 4:40 Bonus track on CD reissue
3. "Time on My Hands" (Harold Adamson, Mack Gordon, Vincent Youmans) - 5:44
4. "As Time Goes By" (Herman Hupfeld) - 6:27
5. "Tall Grass" (Jordan) - 2:52 Bonus track on CD reissue
6. "When You're Smiling" (Mark Fisher, Joe Goodwin, Larry Shay) - 1:56
7. "Dancer's Call" (Jordan) - 3:41 Bonus track on CD reissue
8. "Orange Mist" (Jordan) - 3:12 Bonus track on CD reissue
9. "All of Me" (Gerald Marks, Seymour Simons) - 5:32
10. "I've Never Been in Love Before" (Frank Loesser) - 2:00 Bonus track on CD reissue
11. "I Didn't Know What Time It Was" (Lorenz Hart, Richard Rodgers) - 4:19
12. "Easy Living" (Ralph Rainger, Leo Robin) - 5:12
13. "Jeepers Creepers" (Johnny Mercer, Harry Warren) - 6:22

== Personnel ==
- Duke Jordan - piano
- Jesper Lundgaard - bass (tracks 1, 3, 4, 6, 9 & 11–13)
- Billy Hart - drums (tracks 1, 3, 4, 6, 9 & 11–13)
