= Jazz Abroad =

Studio album by Roy Haynes/Quincy Jones
- Released: 1955
- Recorded: November 10, 1953 and October 3, 1954
- Studios: Stockholm, Sweden
- Genre: Jazz
- Length: 45:07
- Label: EmArcy

Roy Haynes chronology
Roy Haynes Modern Group (1956)	Jazz Abroad (1955)	We Three (1959)

Quincy Jones chronology
Jazz Abroad (1955)	This Is How I Feel About Jazz (1956)

Jazz Abroad is a split album by the American jazz drummer Roy Haynes and Quincy Jones with tracks recorded in Sweden in 1953 and 1954 and released by EmArcy.

== Reception ==
Professional ratings
Review scores
Source	Rating
Allmusic	3/5 stars

Allmusic awarded the album 3 stars.

== Track listing ==
Side A:

1. "Pogo Stick" (Quincy Jones) - 6:20
2. "Liza (All the Clouds'll Roll Away)" (George Gershwin, Ira Gershwin, Gus Kahn) - 5:36
3. "Jones' Bones" (Jones) - 5:42
4. "Sometimes I'm Happy" (Irving Caesar, Clifford Grey, Vincent Youmans) - 5:54

Side B:

1. "Little Leona" (Adrian Acea) - 4:56
2. "Miss Mopsy" (Joe Benjamin) - 5:07
3. "Gone Again" (Curtis Lewis) - 6:03
4. "Hagnes" (Roy Haynes, Sahib Shihab) - 5:29
- Recorded in Stockholm, Sweden on November 10, 1953 (Side A) and October 3, 1954 (Side B)

== Personnel ==
Side A:

- Quincy Jones - arranger, conductor
- Art Farmer - trumpet
- Jimmy Cleveland - trombone
- Åke Persson - trombone
- Arne Domnerus - alto saxophone, clarinet
- Lars Gullin - baritone saxophone
- Bengt Hallberg - piano
- Simon Brehm - bass
- Alan Dawson - drums

Side B:

- Åke Persson - trombone (tracks 1 & 2)
- Bjarne Nerem - tenor saxophone (tracks 1–3)
- Ed Gregory (Sahib Shihab) - baritone saxophone, alto saxophone (tracks 1–3)
- Adrian Acea - piano
- Joe Benjamin - bass
- Roy Haynes - drums
