= Roy Haynes =

American jazz drummer and group leader (1925–2024)

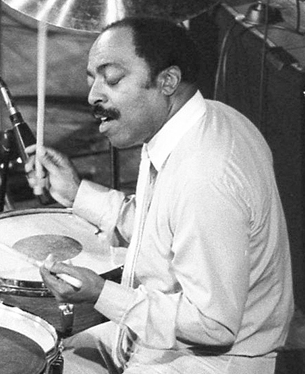
- Haynes performing in 1981

Background information
- Born: Roy Owen Haynes; March 13, 1925; Boston, Massachusetts, U.S.
- Died: November 12, 2024 (aged 99) Nassau County, New York, U.S.
- Genre: Jazz
- Occupation: Musician
- Instrument: Drums
- Years active: 1942–2020
- Labels: Mainstream, EmArcy, Galaxy, Impulse!, New Jazz, Vogue, Pacific Jazz, Evidence, Marge

Roy Owen Haynes (March 13, 1925 – November 12, 2024) was an American jazz drummer. In the 1950s, he was given the nickname "Snap Crackle" for his distinctive snare drum sound and musical vocabulary. He is among the most recorded drummers in jazz. In a career spanning more than eight decades, he played swing, bebop, jazz fusion and avant-garde jazz. He is considered to be a pioneer of jazz drumming.

Haynes led bands, including the Hip Ensemble. His albums Fountain of Youth and Whereas were nominated for a Grammy Award. He was inducted into the Modern Drummer Hall of Fame in 1999.

== Career ==
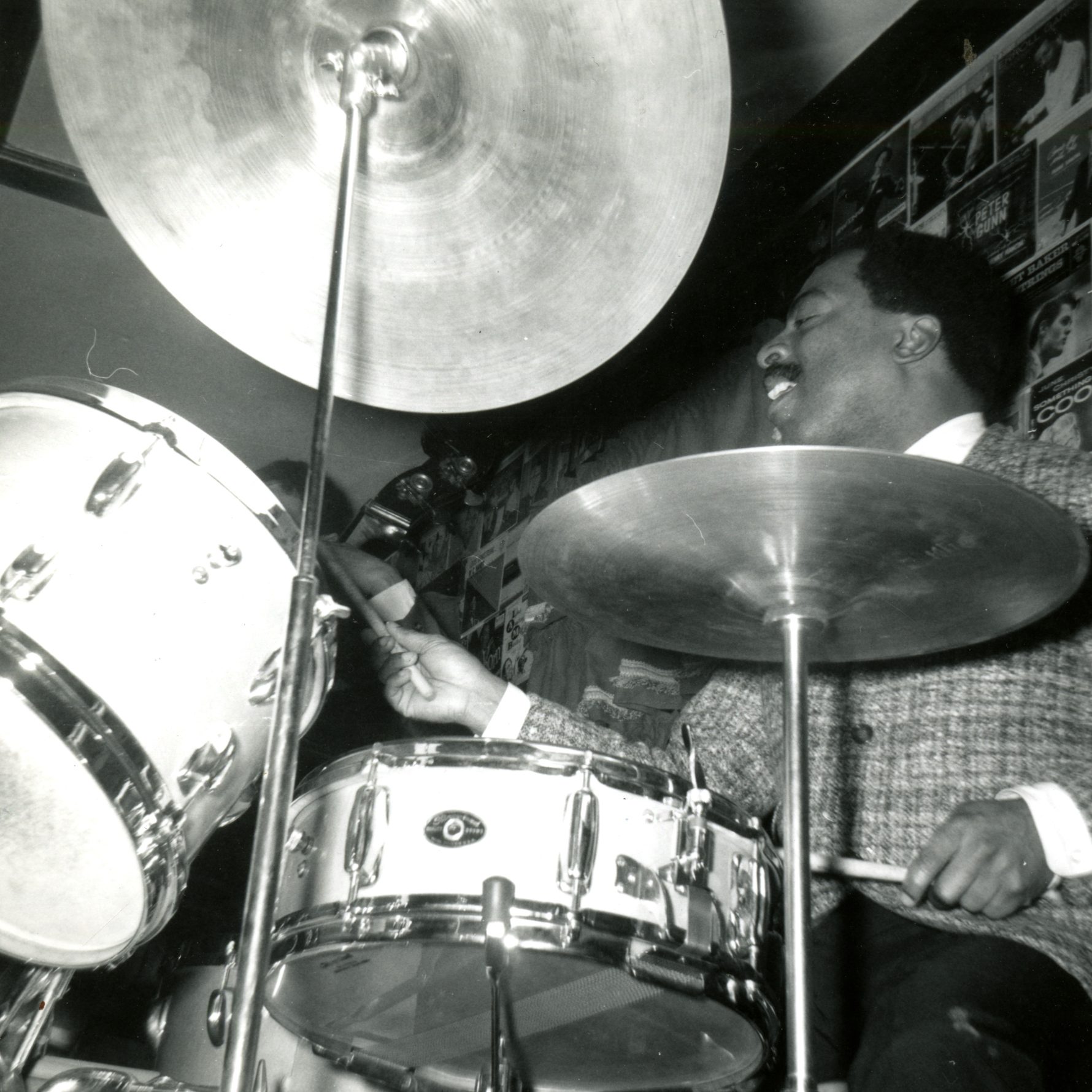
Haynes performing in 1964

Haynes was born on March 13, 1925, in the Roxbury neighborhood of Boston, to Gustavas and Edna Haynes, immigrants from Barbados. His younger brother, Michael E. Haynes, became an important leader in the African American community in Massachusetts, working with Martin Luther King Jr. during the civil rights movement, representing Roxbury in the Massachusetts House of Representatives and for forty years serving as pastor of the Twelfth Baptist Church. King had been a member at the church while he pursued his doctoral degree at Boston University.

Haynes made his professional debut in 1942 in Boston and began his full-time professional career in 1945. From 1947 to 1949 he worked with saxophonist Lester Young, and from 1949 to 1952 was a member of saxophonist Charlie Parker's quintet. He also recorded at the time with pianist Bud Powell and saxophonists Wardell Gray and Stan Getz. From 1953 to 1958, he toured with singer Sarah Vaughan and recorded with her. In the 1950s he was given the nickname "Snap Crackle". In the 1960s, he was a member of the John Coltrane Quartet, often working as a sub for drummer Elvin Jones. In 1990, he co-led the album Question and Answer with Pat Metheny. Haynes led bands including the Hip Ensemble.

A tribute song was recorded by Jim Keltner and Charlie Watts of the Rolling Stones, and he appeared on stage with the Allman Brothers Band in 2006 and Page McConnell of Phish in 2008. "Age seems to have just passed him by," Watts observed. "He's eighty-three and in 2006 he was voted Best Contemporary Jazz Drummer [in Modern Drummer magazine's readers' poll]. He's amazing."

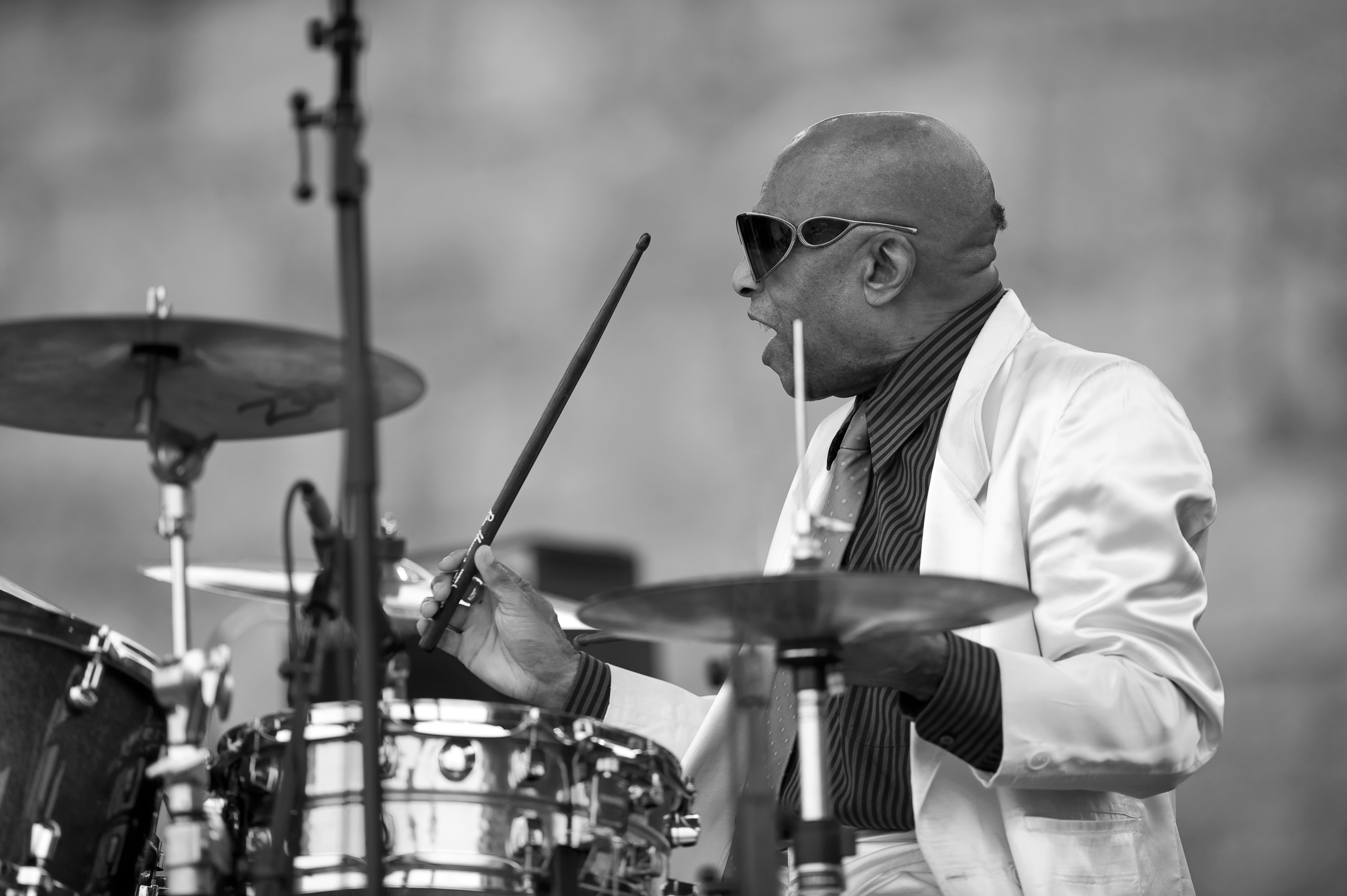
Haynes, George Wein's CareFusion Jazz Festival 55, Newport, Rhode Island, August 2009

In 2008, Haynes voiced a DJ for the fictional classic jazz radio station, Jazz Nation Radio 108.5 on the open-world video game Grand Theft Auto IV. His last album, Roy-Alty, was released in 2011.

== Personal life ==
His son Graham Haynes is a cornetist; another son Craig Holiday Haynes and grandson Marcus Gilmore are both drummers.

Haynes was known to celebrate his birthdays on stage and in later years at the Blue Note Jazz Club in New York City. His 95th birthday celebration in 2020 was canceled due to the COVID-19 pandemic.

On November 12, 2024, following a short illness, Haynes died at age 99 in Nassau County, New York, on the South Shore of Long Island.

== Awards and honors ==
A Life in Time – The Roy Haynes Story was named by The New Yorker magazine as one of the Best Boxed Sets of 2007 and was nominated for an award by the Jazz Journalist's Association. WKCR-FM, New York, surveyed Haynes's career in 301 hours of programming, January 11–23, 2009. Esquire named Roy Haynes one of the best-dressed men in America in 1960, along with Fred Astaire, Miles Davis, Clark Gable, and Cary Grant.

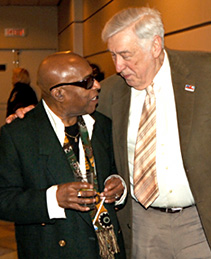
Roy Haynes (left) and Gunther Schuller, January 2008

In 1994 Haynes was awarded the Danish Jazzpar Prize, and in 1996 the French government knighted him with the Chevalier de l'Ordre des Arts et des Lettres, France's top literary and artistic honor. In 1995, the U.S. National Endowment for the Arts named Haynes as a NEA Jazz Master. Haynes received honorary doctorates from the Berklee College of Music (1991), and the New England Conservatory of Music (2004), as well as a Peabody Medal, the highest honor bestowed by the Peabody Institute of The Johns Hopkins University, in 2012. He was inducted into the DownBeat magazine Hall of Fame in 2004. On October 9, 2010, he was awarded the Mid Atlantic Arts Foundation's BNY Mellon Jazz Living Legacy Award at the Kennedy Center for the Performing Arts in Washington, DC. In 2001, Haynes's album Birds of a Feather: A Tribute to Charlie Parker was nominated for the 44th Annual Grammy Awards as Best Jazz Instrumental Album.

On December 22, 2010, Haynes was named a recipient of a Grammy Lifetime Achievement Award by the National Academy of Recording Arts and Sciences, and he received the award at the Special Merit Awards Ceremony & Nominees Reception of the 54th Annual Grammy Awards on February 11, 2012. In 2019, he was given the Lifetime Achievement Award by the Jazz Foundation of America at the 28th Annual Loft Party.

Year	Result	Award	Category	Work
1988	Nominated	Grammy Award	Best Jazz Instrumental Performance, Group	Chick Corea – Trio Music, Live in Europe
1989	Won	Grammy Award	Best Jazz Instrumental Performance, Group	McCoy Tyner – Blues for Coltrane: A Tribute to John Coltrane
1996	Nominated	Grammy Award	Best Jazz Instrumental Performance, Individual or Group	Kenny Barron – Wanton Spirit
1998	Nominated	Grammy Award	Best Jazz Instrumental Performance, Individual or Group	Chick Corea – Remembering Bud Powell
2000	Won	Grammy Award	Best Jazz Instrumental Performance, Individual or Group	Gary Burton – Like Minds
2001	Won	DownBeat Critics Poll	Drums	
2002	Nominated	Grammy Award	Best Jazz Instrumental Album	Birds of a Feather: A Tribute to Charlie Parker
2002	Won	DownBeat Critics Poll	Drums	
2003	Won	DownBeat Critics Poll	Drums	
2004	Won	DownBeat Critics Poll	Hall of Fame	
2004	Won	DownBeat Critics Poll	Drums	
2005	Nominated	Grammy Award	Best Jazz Instrumental Album, Individual or Group	Fountain of Youth
2005	Won	DownBeat Critics Poll	Drums	
2007	Nominated	Grammy Award	Best Jazz Instrumental Solo	"Hippidy Hop" in A Life in Time: The Roy Haynes Story
2007	Won	DownBeat Critics Poll	Drums	
2008	Won	DownBeat Critics Poll	Drums	
2009	Won	DownBeat Critics Poll	Drums	
2010	Won	DownBeat Critics Poll	Drums	
2012	Won	Grammy Award	Lifetime Achievement Award	
2019	Won	Jazz Foundation of America	Lifetime Achievement Award	

== Selected discography ==
- Busman's Holiday (EmArcy, 1955)
- Jazz Abroad (Mercury, 1956) – recorded in 1953. split album with Quincy Jones.
- We Three with Paul Chambers & Phineas Newborn (New Jazz, 1959) – recorded in 1958
- Just Us (New Jazz, 1960)
- Out of the Afternoon (Impulse!, 1962)
- Cracklin' with Booker Ervin (New Jazz, 1963)
- Cymbalism (New Jazz, 1963).
- Hip Ensemble (Mainstream, 1971)
- Senyah (Mainstream, 1972)
- Thank You Thank You (Galaxy, 1977)
- Vistalite (Galaxy, 1979) – recorded in 1977
- Birds of a Feather: A Tribute to Charlie Parker (Dreyfus Jazz, 2001) – Grammy-nominated album
- Whereas (Dreyfus Jazz, 2006)

=== Compilations ===
- Fountain of Youth (Dreyfus Jazz, 2004) – Grammy-nominated album
