= Yusef Lateef discography =

A discography of the multi-instrumentalist Yusef Lateef (1920–2013).

== Discography ==
=== As leader/co-leader ===
Recording date	Title / Co-leader	Label	Year released	Notes
1957-04	Jazz for the Thinker	Savoy	1957	Album from Savoy Records
1957-04	Jazz Mood	Savoy	1957	Debut album from the second recording session
1957-04	Stable Mates	Savoy	1957	Split album with A. K. Salim
1957-04	Before Dawn: The Music of Yusef Lateef	Verve	1958	
1957–10	Prayer to the East	Savoy	1957	
1957–10	Jazz and the Sounds of Nature	Savoy	1958	
1957–10	The Sounds of Yusef	Prestige	1958	
1957–10	Other Sounds also released as Expression! (1969)	Prestige/New Jazz	1959	
1958–04	Lateef at Cranbrook	Argo	1958	Live at Cranbrook Academy of Art in Detroit
1959–06	The Dreamer	Savoy	1959	
1959–06	The Fabric of Jazz	Savoy	1959	
1957–10, 1959-10	Cry! – Tender	Prestige/New Jazz	1960	
1960–05	The Three Faces of Yusef Lateef also released as This Is Yusef Lateef (1968)	Riverside	1960	
1960-10	The Centaur and the Phoenix	Riverside	1960	Bonus tracks are recorded in 1961
1961–08	Lost in Sound	Charlie Parker	1962	
1961–09	Eastern Sounds	Prestige/Moodsville	1962	
1961–12	Into Something	Prestige/New Jazz	1962	
1963–12	Jazz 'Round the World	Impulse!	1964	
1964–06	Live at Pep's (Volume 1 & Volume 2)	Impulse!	1965	Live at Pep's in Philadelphia
1965–02	1984	Impulse!	1965	
1965–07	Psychicemotus	Impulse!	1965	
1965–12, 1966-01	Live in London	Harkit	2004	Live at Ronnie Scott's Jazz Club in London
1966–03	A Flat, G Flat and C	Impulse!	1966	
1966–06	The Golden Flute	Impulse!	1967	
1967–06	The Complete Yusef Lateef	Atlantic	1968	
1968–04	The Blue Yusef Lateef	Atlantic	1968	
1967–06, 1969-02	Yusef Lateef's Detroit	Atlantic	1969	
1968–04, 1969-05	The Diverse Yusef Lateef	Atlantic	1970	
1970–04	Suite 16	Atlantic	1970	
1970–04, 1971-09	The Gentle Giant	Atlantic	1972	
1972-05, 1972-09	Hush 'N' Thunder	Atlantic	1973	
1971–09, 1973-04, 1973-05, 1973-12	Part of the Search	Atlantic	1974	
1974–07	10 Years Hence	Atlantic	1975	[2LP] Live recording at Keystone Korner with studio overdubs
1976–03	The Doctor Is In... and Out	Atlantic	1976	
1977–10	Autophysiopsychic	CTI	1977	With Art Farmer (trumpet)
1977–11	At The Bottom Line	YAL	2006	Live at The Bottom Line in NYC
1979–05	In a Temple Garden	CTI	1979	
1983?	Hikima: Creativity	Ahmadu Bello University	1983	[LP] Research in Centre for Nigerian Cultural Studies. Reissued in 2019.
1983–07	In Nigeria	Landmark	1985	
1987–06	Yusef Lateef's Little Symphony	Atlantic	1987	Grammy Award for Best New Age Recording
1986–05, 1988-03	Concerto for Yusef Lateef	Atlantic	1988	
1989?	Nocturnes	Atlantic	1989	
1990?	Meditations	Atlantic	1990	
1991–01	Yusef Lateef's Encounters	Atlantic	1991	Backing Vocals – Nnenna Freelon
1991	Yusef Lateef's Metamusic	YAL	2020	[CD] Limited edition
1992–01	Heart Vision	YAL	1992	Recorded in Bentonia, Mississippi
1992–01	Tenors of Yusef Lateef and Archie Shepp with Archie Shepp	YAL	1992	
1992?	Concerto for Woodwinds	YAL	1992	
1992–07	Tenors of Yusef Lateef and Von Freeman with Von Freeman	YAL	1992	
1992–12	Yusef Lateef Plays Ballads	YAL	1993	
1993–05	Tenors featuring Rene McLean	YAL	1993	With René McLean (tenor saxophone)
1993–07	Woodwinds	YAL	1993	With Ralph M. Jones III
1993–10, 1993-11	The African-American Epic Suite (For Quintet and Orchestra)	ACT	1994	Recorded at WDR Cologne
1993–12	Metamorphosis ∞	YAL/Bomba	1994	
1993–12	Claiming Open Spaces: Music from the Soundtrack	YAL	1994	Soundtrack of the documentary film Claiming Open Spaces (1995) by Austin Allen
1994–05	Suite Life	YAL	1994	
1994	Tenors of Yusef Lateef & Ricky Ford with Ricky Ford	YAL/Bomba	1996	
1994–12	Cantata	YAL	1995	Research album
1995-06	The World at Peace (Music For 12 Musicians) with Adam Rudolph	YAL/Meta	1997	[2CD] Live at The Jazz Bakery in Los Angeles
1995–12	Yusef Lateef's Fantasia for Flute	YAL	1996	
1996–05	Full Circle	YAL	1996	
1997–01	Earth and Sky (Tenors and Flutes) with Sayyd Abdul Al-Khabyyr	YAL	1997	
1997	Sonata Fantasia with Alex J. Marcelo	YAL	1997	
1997	Chnops: Gold and Soul	YAL	1997	
1998	9 Bagatelles	YAL	1998	
1998	Like the Dust (Flutes, Guitars & Percussion)	YAL	1999	
1999–01	Live in Seattle with Adam Rudolph	YAL	1999	Live album
2000–02	Beyond the Sky with Adam Rudolph	YAL/Meta	2000	In celebration of Lateef's 80th birthday year
2000	A G.I.F.T. (Goodness Inwardness Forgiving Tolerance)	YAL	2000	
2001	So Peace	YAL	2001	Featuring Sylvia Cooper O'Daniel
2001-04	Live at The Luckman Theater with Eternal Wind	YAL	2001	[CD / DVD-Video] Live at The Luckman Theater, California State University, Los Angeles
2001	Ear Riptus	YAL	2002	With Matt Waugh
2002-02	Homage To Yusef Lateef with Corvini & Iodice Roma Jazz Ensemble	YAL	2002	Live at The Teatro Metastasio in Prato (Metastasio Jazz 2002)
2002-09	A Tribute Concert for Yusef Lateef	YAL	2002	YAL's 10th Anniversary live album
2003-03	In the Garden with Adam Rudolph and "Go: Organic Orchestra"	YAL/Meta	2003	[2CD] Live at The Electric Lodge in Los Angeles
2004–03, 2004-08	Roots Run Deep	RogueArt	2012	With Nicolas Humbert and Marc Parisotto
2005–03	Influence with Stéphane Belmondo and Lionel Belmondo	B-Flat recordings	2007	[2CD]
2008–12	Voice Prints with Roscoe Mitchell, Adam Rudolph and Douglas R. Ewart	Meta	2013	Live at The Walker Art Center in Minneapolis
2009-09	Towards the Unknown with Adam Rudolph	Meta	2010	With Go: Organic Orchestra Strings. Recorded at Roulette Intermedium in NYC.
2012-06	Live at the Olympia with Ahmad Jamal	Meta	2014	[2CD + DVD-Video] Live at The Olympia in Paris

Compilation

- The Last Savoy Sessions (Savoy Jazz, 2000)[2CD]

=== As a member ===
Universal Quartet
(With Adam Rudolph, Kasper Tranberg and Kresten Osgood)

- Universal Quartet (Blackout Music, 2009) – rec. 2008
- Light (ILK Music, 2013) – rec. 2009

=== As sideman ===
With Cannonball Adderley

- 1962: The Cannonball Adderley Sextet in New York (Riverside, 1962)
- 1962: Cannonball in Europe! (Capitol, 1962)
- 1962: Jazz Workshop Revisited (Riverside, 1962)
- 1963 Nippon Soul (Riverside, 1964) – live
- 1963 Autumn Leaves (Riverside, 1975) – live
- 1962-1963 The Sextet (Milestone, 1982)

With Curtis Fuller

- Images of Curtis Fuller (Savoy, 1960)
- Boss of the Soul-Stream Trombone (Warwick, 1961) – rec. 1960

With Charles Mingus

- 1960: Pre-Bird (Mercury, 1961) – reissued as Mingus Revisited (Limelight)
- 1960: Jazz Makers (Mercury, 1963)

With others

- Nat Adderley, That's Right! (Riverside, 1960)
- Ernestine Anderson, My Kinda Swing (Mercury, 1961) – rec. 1960
- Art Blakey, The African Beat (Blue Note, 1962)
- Donald Byrd, Byrd Jazz (Transition, 1956) – live rec. 1955
- Paul Chambers, 1st Bassman (Vee Jay, 1961) – rec. 1960
- Art Farmer, Something You Got (CTI, 1977)
- Dizzy Gillespie, The Complete RCA Victor Recordings (Bluebird, 1995) – compilation
- Grant Green, Grantstand (Blue Note, 1962) – rec. 1961
- Slide Hampton, Drum Suite (Epic, 1964) – rec. 1962
- Louis Hayes, Louis Hayes (Vee-Jay, 1960) – re-issued as Contemplation (1974) under Lateef's name
- Les McCann, Invitation to Openness (Atlantic, 1972) – rec. 1971
- Don McLean, Homeless Brother (United Artists, 1974)
- Sonny Red, Breezing (Jazzland, 1961) – rec. 1960
- Leon Redbone, Double Time (Warner Bros., 1977)
- A. K. Salim, Afro-Soul/Drum Orgy (Prestige, 1965) – rec. 1964
- Clark Terry, Color Changes (Candid, 1961) – rec. 1960
- Doug Watkins, Soulnik (New Jazz, 1960)
- Randy Weston, Uhuru Afrika (Roulette, 1961) – rec. 1960
- Various Artists, Jazz Is Busting Out All Over (Savoy, 1958)
