= Blue Bird Inn =

Jazz night club in Detroit, Michigan, US

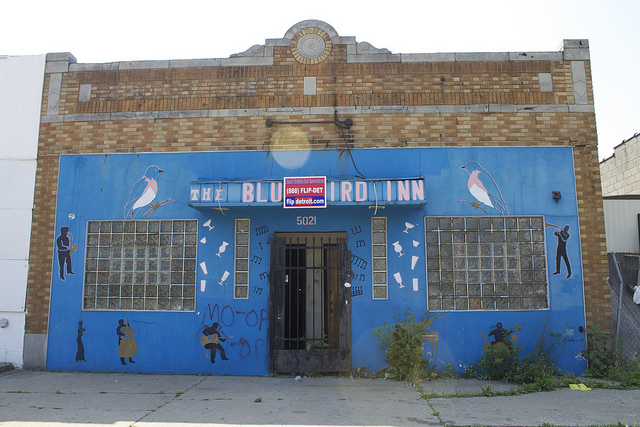
Blue Bird Inn, July 2011

The Blue Bird Inn, at 5021 Tireman, was a jazz night club in Detroit presenting music every night except Monday. An African American owned venue, by the end of the 1940s it was the most important live outlet for bop in the city.

Thad Jones' composition "5021" refers to the Blue Bird's address and Tommy Flanagan placed tribute to the venue in the title track to an album with Kenny Burrell titled Beyond the Blue Bird (1990).

== Background ==
The venue had featured live music since the 1930s, but in 1948 Phil Hill was hired to assemble a house band that could play bebop. Hill's first trio there comprised Abe Woodly on vibraphone and Art Mardigian on drums, with Hill on piano.

The following year, Hill and Mardigan were joined by Wardell Gray, James "Beans" Richardson on bass and Jack Tiant on bongos, and, as the Phil Hill Quintet, recorded a live album on July 20, 1949. The following April, the Wardell Gray Quartet, with Hill, Richardson and Mardigan recorded for Prestige.

In the latter half of 1949, the trio was headlined by Tate Houston, and later by Frank Foster.

In the early 1950s, the Billy Mitchell Quintet, featuring Elvin Jones, replaced Hill's trio as the house band. In 1953, Miles Davis joined the band, and would return many times with his own groups.

Other performers included Pepper Adams, Sonny Stitt, Ahmad Jamal, Donald Byrd, Frank Gant, and Curtis Fuller.

In 2018, Detroit Sound Conservancy, local music preservation and advocacy nonprofit, purchased the building.

The National Park Service conducted a study of the site and United Sound Systems in 2019 but found they were not suitable to be an affiliated area of the national park system.

In 2020, the club was designated a local Historic District by the City of Detroit.

In 2025, Detroit Sound Conservancy received a 1.9 million dollar grant from The Mellon Foundation. The current plan is to restore the club and use it, not only as a music venue, but also as a cultural heritage center and space for community programming.

== House bands ==
Led by

- 1948: Phil Hill
- 1951: Billy Mitchell, featuring various musicians, including Oliver Jackson (drums) and his brother, Ali Jackson (bass), as well as Thad Jones, but later becoming a quartet with Terry Pollard, Beans Richardson and Elvin Jones
- 1954: Beans Anderson
- 1955: Alvin Jackson
- 1958: Ernie Farrow and/or Yusef Lateef
