= Bemsha Swing (album) =

Live album by Woody Shaw
- Released: 1997
- Recorded: February 26 & 27, 1986; Baker's Keyboard Lounge, Detroit, Michigan
- Genre: Jazz
- Labels: Blue Note; CDP 7243
- Producer: Michael Cuscuna

Woody Shaw chronology
Double Take (1985)	Bemsha Swing (1997)	Solid (1986)

Bemsha Swing is a live album led by trumpeter Woody Shaw which was recorded by drummer Roy Brooks (who plays on the album) in Detroit in 1986. The music was first released on the Blue Note label in 1997. Shaw and Brooks were both in pianist Horace Silver's band in the mid-1960s (though at different times), and they recorded together under Brooks' leadership on the 1972 live album The Free Slave.

== Reception ==
Professional ratings
Review scores
Source	Rating
Allmusic	4/5 stars
The Penguin Guide to Jazz Recordings	3.5/4 stars

Scott Yanow of Allmusic stated, "Despite worsening health and terrible eyesight, he was still in very good playing form in 1986 when he performed the music (recorded at Baker's Keyboard Lounge in Detroit) that resulted in this previously unissued double-CD from 1997... There is no feeling of decline or even world-weariness in the trumpeter's playing, and his solos are full of constant invention and enthusiastic ideas. This highly recommended set was one of Woody Shaw's last great recordings". Bill Shoemaker reviewed the album for JazzTimes in December 1997 stating "while the trumpeter's career was declining, and his life tragically unraveling, his creative abilities were still, at least occasionally, at the level of his high-profile '70s zenith'... the great trumpeter's legacy is well-served by Bemsha Swing".

== Track listing ==
All compositions by Woody Shaw except as indicated

Disc One:

1. "Bemsha Swing" (Denzil Best, Thelonious Monk) - 10:29
2. "Ginseng People" - 12:06
3. "Well, You Needn't" (Monk) - 14:34
4. "Eric" (Geri Allen) - 6:05
5. "United" (Wayne Shorter) - 11:39

Disc Two:

1. "Nutty" (Monk) - 13:08
2. "In a Capricornian Way" - 15:40
3. "Star Eyes" (Gene de Paul, Don Raye) - 15:38
4. "Theloniously Speaking" (Roy Brooks) - 9:30
- Recorded at Baker's Keyboard Lounge in Detroit, Michigan on February 26 (Disc One, track 1 and Disc Two) and February 27 (Disc One, tracks 2–5), 1986

== Personnel ==
- Woody Shaw - trumpet
- Geri Allen - piano
- Robert Hurst - bass
- Roy Brooks - drums
