= Buster Cooper =

American jazz trombonist (1929–2016)

George "Buster" Cooper (April 4, 1929 – May 13, 2016) was an American jazz trombonist.

== Career ==
A native of St. Petersburg, Florida, United States, Cooper played in a territory band with Nat Towles in Texas in the late 1940s and with Lionel Hampton in 1953. He played in the house band at the Apollo Theater in New York City in the mid-1950s, and following this he was in Benny Goodman's band. Late in the 1950s he and his brother Steve formed the Cooper Brothers Band. From 1962 to 1969, he was a trombonist in Duke Ellington's Orchestra. In 1973, he moved to Los Angeles, and played in jazz orchestras over the next several decades, including Bill Berry's band and The Capp-Pierce Juggernaut. He led a trio at a restaurant in St. Petersburg, Florida.

In 1993, Cooper appeared as a jazz trombonist in the film Murder Between Friends, set in New Orleans.

George "Buster" Cooper died on May 13, 2016, of prostate cancer in St. Petersburg, Florida, at the age of 87.

== Discography ==
=== As leader ===
- E-Bone-Ix with Thurman Green (Blue Lady, 1998)

=== As sideman ===
With The Capp-Pierce Juggernaut

- Juggernaut (Concord Jazz, 1977)
- Live at the Century Plaza (Concord Jazz, 1978)
- Juggernaut Strikes Again! (Concord Jazz, 1982)
- Live at the Alley Cat (Concord Jazz, 1987)

With Duke Ellington

- The Symphonic Ellington (Reprise, 1963)
- Afro-Bossa (Reprise, 1963)
- Ellington '65 (Reprise, 1964)
- Plays with the Original Motion Picture Score Mary Poppins (Reprise, 1964)
- Harlem 1964 (Pablo, 1985)
- Duke Ellington's Concert of Sacred Music (RCA Victor, 1966)
- The Popular Duke Ellington (RCA Victor, 1966)
- Antibes Concert (Verve, 1967)
- The Far East Suite (RCA Victor, 1967)
- Liederhalle Stuttgart 1967 (SWR, Jazzhaus, 2020)
- And His Mother Called Him Bill (RCA, 1968)
- Second Sacred Concert (Fantasy, 1968)
- Yale Concert (Fantasy, 1973)
- The Great Paris Concert (Atlantic, 1973)
- Duke Ellington's Jazz Violin Session (Atlantic, 1976)
- Up in Duke's Workshop (Pablo, 1979)
- Concert in the Virgin Islands (Discovery, 1981)
- Serenade to Sweden (Black Lion, 1982)
- Harlem (Pablo, 1985)
- All Star Road Band Volume 2 (Doctor Jazz, 1985)

With Ella Fitzgerald & Duke Ellington

- Ella at Duke's Place (Verve, 1966)
- The Stockholm Concert 1966 (Pablo, 1984)
- Ella & Duke at the Cote D'Azur (Verve, 1997)

With Lionel Hampton

- Wailin' at the Trianon (Columbia, 1955)
- Lionel Hampton (Amiga, 1976)
- Aurex Jazz Festival '81 (EastWorld, 1981)
- Ambassador at Large (Glad-Hamp, 1984)

With Johnny Hodges

- Everybody Knows (Impulse!, 1964)
- Triple Play (RCA Victor, 1967)
- Swing's Our Thing (Verve, 1968)

With A. K. Salim

- Stable Mates (Savoy, 1957)
- Pretty for the People (Savoy, 1957)
- Blues Suite (Savoy, 1958)

With others

- Cat Anderson, A Chat with Cat Anderson (Columbia, 1963)
- Billy Brooks, Windows of the Mind (Crossover, 1974)
- Ruth Brown, Fine and Mellow (Fantasy, 1992)
- Milt Buckner, The Definitive Black & Blue Sessions (Black and Blue, 1998)
- Lawrence Brown, Inspired Abandon (Impulse!, 1965)
- Arnett Cobb, Smooth Sailing (Prestige, 1959)
- Arnett Cobb, The Wild Man from Texas (Black and Blue, 1977)
- Harry "Sweets" Edison, For My Pals (Pablo, 1988)
- Jimmy Forrest, Soul Street (Original Jazz Classics, 1998)
- Benny Goodman, Happy Session (Columbia, 1959)
- Earl Hines, Once Upon a Time (Impulse! 1966)
- Abdullah Ibrahim, Bra Joe from Kilimanjaro (The Sun, 1979)
- Abdullah Ibrahim, Tintinyana (Kaz, 1988)
- Mundell Lowe, Satan in High Heels (Charlie Parker, 1961)
- Mundell Lowe, Blues for a Stripper (Charlie Parker, 1962)
- Oscar Peterson, Plays Duke Ellington (Pablo, 1999)
- Bobby Short, Guess Who's in Town (Atlantic, 1987)
- Frank Sinatra, Francis A. & Edward K. (Reprise, 1988)
- O. C. Smith, Love Changes (Motown 1982)
- Billy Strayhorn, Lush Life (Red Baron, 1992)
- Dinah Washington, Wise Woman Blues (Rosetta, 1984)
- Gerald Wilson, Calafia (Trend, 1985)
