= Terry Pollard =

American jazz musician (1931–2009)

Terry Pollard (August 15, 1931 – December 16, 2009) was an American jazz pianist and vibraphonist active in the Detroit jazz scene of the 1940s and 1950s. She has been described as a "major player who was inexplicably overlooked."

Pollard began her career by collaborating with other Detroit musicians, such as Billy Mitchell (and Elvin Jones, in the house band at the Blue Bird Inn), Johnny Hill, and the Emmitt Slay Trio. She was discovered by Terry Gibbs and toured with him in the early 1950s, playing piano and vibraphone. They recorded several albums, including Terry Gibbs Quartet - Featuring Terry Pollard. Pollard appeared with Gibbs on an episode of The Tonight Show hosted by Steve Allen. Her collaborations with Gibbs from 1953 to 1957 marked the height of her career.

Pollard also performed with John Coltrane, Charlie Parker, Miles Davis, Chet Baker, Nat King Cole, Dinah Washington, Duke Ellington and Ella Fitzgerald.

Pollard recorded a self-titled solo album for Bethlehem Records in 1955 and won DownBeat magazine's New Artist award in 1956. Pollard retired from her full-time music career shortly thereafter in order to raise a family, but she continued to play locally in Detroit and performed with artists including Diana Ross and The Supremes. She was inducted into the Michigan Jazz Hall of Fame.

Her contributions to the mid-century Detroit jazz scene were recognized in the book Before Motown: A History of Jazz in Detroit 1920-1960, by Lars Bjorn and Jim Gallert.

== Discography ==
- Terry Pollard Quintet (Bethlehem, 1955)
- Terry Pollard And Her Septet: Cats vs. Chicks - A Jazz Battle Of The Sexes (album shared with Clark Terry Septet, MGM 1954)

With Terry Gibbs

- Terry (Brunswick, 1954 [1955])
- Terry Gibbs [AKA Terry Gibbs Quartet Featuring Terry Pollard] (EmArcy 1955)
- Mallets-A-Plenty (EmArcy 1956)
- Swingin' with Terry Gibbs and His Orchestra (EmArcy, 1957)

With Yusef Lateef

- Lateef at Cranbrook (Argo, 1958)
- The Dreamer (Savoy, 1959)
- The Fabric of Jazz (Savoy, 1959)
- Angel Eyes, (Savoy Jazz, 1979) 2LP reissue of The Dreamer and The Fabric of Jazz
- Beautiful Flowers (Savoy Jazz, 2005) CD compilation of Savoy tracks
- At Cranbrook and Elsewhere (2009)

With Dorothy Ashby

- Soft Winds (Jazzland, 1961)

With Don Fagerquist

- Portrait of a Great Jazz Artist (2005)
