= Left Bank Jazz Society =

Organization formed in 1964 to promote jazz in Baltimore, Maryland, US

The Left Bank Jazz Society was a Baltimore, Maryland-based organization that promoted jazz in Baltimore. It formed in 1964, hosting a series of concerts featuring nationally acclaimed performers like John Coltrane and Duke Ellington. Recordings of these performances were tied up in legal disputes and few were officially released until 2000 (with the notable exception of two mid-1990s Verve Records releases by Joe Henderson).

Left Bank was founded by Vernon L. Welsh (10 February 1919 – 8 August 2002 Baltimore, Maryland) and Benny Kearse (16 March 1930 Allendale, South Carolina – 29 June 1999 Baltimore, Maryland). Welsh recorded more than 800 jazz performances at the Famous Ballroom during the 1960s and 1970s. The tapes recorded by Welsh had been stored at the Morgan State University library for years. Veteran record producer Joel Dorn of the Label M record company, who acquired the tapes, began reissuing them and they subsequently found favor with critics and jazz aficionados.

For seven years, Kearse was president of the group, which sponsored 47 concerts a season at its peak. The Left Bank's first gig was held at the Al-Ho Club, in the 2500 block of Frederick Ave., the year it was founded. After three moves, the society established a long run at the Famous Ballroom in 1967. Portions of Robert Mugge's 1980 documentary, Sun Ra: A Joyful Noise, were shot at the Famous Ballroom during the Left Bank's residency there. The hall is the site of the expanded Charles Theatre.

== Selected discography ==
As producer and live performance venue

- Jam Gems: Live at the Left Bank - Freddie Hubbard and Jimmy Heath, Label M (1965)
- Straight, No Chaser - Joe Henderson with The Wynton Kelly Trio, Verve (recorded 1968)
- Four - Joe Henderson with The Wynton Kelly Trio, Verve (recorded 1968)
- The Free Slave - Roy Brooks (1970)
- Left Bank Encores - Sonny Stitt and Gene Ammons (1973)
