= Kiane Zawadi =

- Born: Bernard Atwell McKinney; November 26, 1932; Detroit, Michigan, U.S.
- Died: May 21, 2024 (aged 91) Brooklyn, New York, U.S.
- Genres: Jazz
- Occupation: Soloist
- Instruments: Euphonium, trombone

Bernard Atwell McKinney, later Kiane Zawadi (November 26, 1932 – May 21, 2024) was an American jazz trombonist and euphonium player, one of the few jazz soloists on the latter instrument.

== Biography ==
McKinney was born into a family of ten children, several of whom also became musicians. He is the uncle of R&B producer and jazz pianist Carlos "Los Da Mystro" McKinney. He first worked with Barry Harris and Sonny Stitt in 1951, and played with Alvin Jackson's band early in the decade. Toward the middle of the 1950s he was with Art Blakey, and he moved with Yusef Lateef to New York City in 1959. In the 1960s he played with Illinois Jacquet, James Moody, and Curtis Fuller. Later that decade he adopted the name Kiane Zawadi. In the 1970s he performed with Archie Shepp, Carlos Garnett, Harold Vick, Frank Foster, Charles Tolliver, Abdullah Ibrahim, and McCoy Tyner. In 1978, he played in the pit orchestra for Dancin', a Broadway show. He appeared at a Charlie Parker tribute at Town Hall in New York City in 1985.

Other musicians Zawadi worked with include Mongo Santamaría, Dizzy Gillespie, Clark Terry, Joe Henderson, and Aretha Franklin.

McKinney died in Brooklyn, New York, on May 21, 2024, at the age of 91.

== Discography ==
=== As sideman ===
With Frank Foster

- 1968 Manhattan Fever
- 1978 Shiny Stockings

With Slide Hampton

- Slide Hampton and His Horn of Plenty (Strand, 1959)
- Sister Salvation (Atlantic, 1960)

With Freddie Hubbard

- 1962 Ready for Freddie (Blue Note)
- 1966 Blue Spirits (Blue Note)
- 1967 High Blues Pressure

With Clifford Jordan

- 1991 Down Through the Years (Milestone)
- 1997 Play What You Feel (Mapleshade)

With Yusef Lateef

- The Dreamer (Savoy, 1959)
- The Fabric of Jazz (Savoy, 1959)

With others

- 1955 Byrd Jazz Donald Byrd
- 1957 The Cool Sound of Pepper Adams, Pepper Adams
- 1961 Cookin' the Blues, James Moody
- 1961 The Futuristic Sounds of Sun Ra, Sun Ra
- 1966 A Slice of the Top, Hank Mobley
- 1966 Cookin' Time, Howard McGhee
- 1968 My People, Freddie Roach
- 1972 Attica Blues, Archie Shepp
- 1972 Willis Jackson Recording Session, Willis "Gator" Jackson
- 1973 African Space Program, Dollar Brand
- 1973 Song of the New World, McCoy Tyner
- 1974 Another Beginning, Les McCann (Atlantic)
- 1974 One for Me, Shirley Scott
- 1974 Your Baby Is a Lady, Jackie DeShannon
- 1974 Don't Look Back, Harold Vick
- 1975 Impact, Charles Tolliver (Strata-East)
- 1975 Let This Melody Ring On, Carlos Garnett (Muse)
- 1975 Vance 32, Kenny Vance
- 1976 Sound of a Drum, Ralph MacDonald
- 1977 Phyllis Hyman, Phyllis Hyman
- 1977 Saturday Night Fever, Cornell Dupree
- 1978 Easy, Grant Green (Versatile)
- 1982 Sentimental Mood, Mickey Bass
- 1988 Jacquet's Got It!, Illinois Jacquet
- 1995 Last Chance for Common Sense, Rodney Kendrick
- 1996 Big Band, Joe Henderson
- 1998 Live in Harlem, Patience Higgins

== Sources ==
- Kiane Zawadi at Allmusic
- Kiane Zawadi discography at Discogs
