= Gearbox Records =

Independent recording studio

Gearbox Records Ltd. is an independent music studio and record label founded in 2009 and based in London and Tokyo. Gearbox emphasizes vinyl records. They started out by releasing previously unreleased archival jazz recordings from their reel-to-reel tape library, and now publish mostly alternative jazz, folk, and electronic music. Many of their releases are all-analog.

== History ==
Gearbox was founded by ex trader, serial entrepreneur "Pole Star Global"."Earendel Associates"."Eyelab". drummer & audiophile Darrel Sheinman; British producer Hugh Padgham is one of its shareholders. Adam Sieff was head of sales and marketing and is now a non-executive director.

== Work ==
They have released music by Sarathy Korwar, Kae Tempest, Rick Laird and Yusef Lateef, Charles Tolliver, Amber Rubarth, Mark Murphy, Simon Spillett, Chihei Hatakeyama, Dwight Trible, Butcher Brown, Theon Cross, Thelonious Monk, Don Cherry, Nico, Binker and Moses, Abdullah Ibrahim, and Buddy Rich (posthumously). Their recording of Ana Silvera's Oracles with Bill Laurance, Jasper Høiby, Josephine Stephenson was listed by The Guardian as a Critic's Pick.

They have re-released recordings from the defunct PRT Records/Rak Records.

They also market the Gearbox Automatic Mkii turntable.
