= Alvin Jackson (musician) =

American jazz double bassist

- Origin: United States
- Genres: Jazz
- Occupation: Musician
- Instrument: Double bass
- Years active: 1940s–1960s

Alvin "AJ" Jackson was an American jazz double bassist.

His first performances were in his high school band with his younger brother, Milt Jackson, and Willie Anderson, Lucky Thompson, Art Mardigan, and George Sirhagen, around 1939–40.

Around 1947, he was playing with Tommy Flanagan's trio with Kenny Burrell, before briefly joining the house band led by Billy Mitchell at Detroit's Blue Bird Inn, before leading it himself in 1955.

The Billy Mitchell–led house band comprised Flanagan, Tate Houston, and Milt Jackson, who had just returned from touring with Woody Herman.

While Alvin Jackson was leading the house band at the Blue Bird in 1955, the line-up comprised Yusef Lateef, Donald Byrd, Bernard McKinney, Barry Harris, and drummers Art Mardigan or Frank Gant.

In September 1959, with house drummer Frank Gant, he backed Thelonious Monk and Charlie Rouse at Detroit's Club 12.

== Discography ==
=== As sideman ===
- 1948: Milt Jackson & His All Stars – Milt Jackson with John Lewis, Alvin Jackson, Kenny Clarke, and Chano Pozo
- 1956: Donald Byrd, Byrd Jazz (Transition)
- 1959: Evans Bradshaw, Pieces of Eighty-Eight (Riverside)
- 1964: Milt Jackson, Vibrations (Atlantic, recorded 1960–1)
