= Hugh Lawson (jazz pianist) =

American jazz musician

- Born: 12 March 1935; Detroit, Michigan, U.S.
- Died: 11 March 1997 (aged 61) White Plains, New York, U.S.
- Genres: Jazz
- Occupation: Musician
- Instrument: Piano
- Years active: 1957–1989
- Labels: Strata-East; Jazzcraft; Storyville; Soul Note; Somethin' Else
- Formerly of: Yusef Lateef

Hugh Lawson (March 12, 1935 – March 11, 1997) was an American jazz pianist from Detroit who worked with Yusef Lateef for more than 10 years.

Inspired by Bud Powell, Hampton Hawes, and Bill Evans, Lawson first gained recognition for his work with Lateef from 1957 onwards. He recorded with Harry "Sweets" Edison (1962), Roy Brooks, and Lateef again on several occasions in the 1960s. In 1972, he performed with "The Piano Choir" (Strata-East), a group with seven pianists including Stanley Cowell and Harold Mabern. He went on to tour with Charles Mingus in 1975 and 1977 and made recordings with Charlie Rouse (1977), George Adams, and as a leader.

Lawson died of colon cancer in White Plains, New York, on March 11, 1997, at the age of 61.

== Discography ==
=== As leader/co-leader ===
Recording year	Title	Label	Release year	Notes / Personnel
1972	Handscapes	Strata-East	1973	With the Piano Choir; in concert
1974	Handscapes 2	Strata-East	1975	With the Piano Choir
1977	Prime Time	Jazzcraft/Storyville		Trio; with Bob Cranshaw (bass), Ben Riley (drums)
1983	Colour	Soul Note		Trio; with Calvin Hill (bass), Louis Hayes (drums)
1989?	Casablanca	Somethin' Else		Trio

=== As sideman ===
With George Adams

- Hand to Hand (Soul Note, 1980) with Dannie Richmond
- Gentleman's Agreement (Soul Note, 1983) with Dannie Richmond
- Nightingale (Blue Note, 1989)
- America (Blue Note, 1990)

With Jimmy Forrest

- Sit Down and Relax with Jimmy Forrest (Prestige, 1961)
- Most Much! (Prestige, 1961)
- Soul Street (New Jazz, 1962)

With Yusef Lateef

- Jazz for the Thinker (Savoy, 1957)
- Stable Mates (Savoy, 1957)
- Jazz Mood (Savoy, 1957)
- Before Dawn: The Music of Yusef Lateef (Verve, 1957)
- Jazz and the Sounds of Nature (Savoy, 1957)
- Prayer to the East (Savoy, 1957)
- The Sounds of Yusef (Prestige, 1957)
- Other Sounds (Prestige, 1957)
- Cry! - Tender (New Jazz, 1959)
- The Three Faces of Yusef Lateef (Riverside, 1960)
- Jazz 'Round the World (Impulse!, 1963)
- A Flat, G Flat and C (Impulse!, 1966)
- The Golden Flute (Impulse!, 1966)
- The Complete Yusef Lateef (Atlantic, 1967)
- The Blue Yusef Lateef (Atlantic, 1968)
- Yusef Lateef's Detroit (Atlantic, 1969)
- The Diverse Yusef Lateef (Atlantic, 1969)

With others

- Roy Brooks, The Free Slave (Muse, 1972) – rec. 1970
- Kenny Burrell, God Bless the Child (CTI, 1971)
- Eddie "Lockjaw" Davis and Harry "Sweets" Eddison, Jawbreakers (Riverside, 1962)
- Al Grey, Having a Ball (Argo, 1963)
- Charlie Rouse, Moment's Notice (Storyville, 1977)
- Doug Watkins, Soulnik (New Jazz, 1960) – with Yusef Lateef
- Joe Williams, Joe Williams Live! A Swingin' Night at Birdland (Roulette, 1962)
