= Stable Mates =

Studio album by Yusef Lateef/A. K. Salim
- Released: 1957
- Recorded: April 5 & 9, 1957; New York City
- Genre: Jazz
- Length: 40:14
- Label: Savoy; MG 12115
- Producer: Ozzie Cadena

A. K. Salim chronology
Flute Suite (1957)	Stable Mates (1957)	Pretty for the People (1957)

Yusef Lateef chronology
Jazz for the Thinker (1957)	Stable Mates (1957)	Jazz Mood (1957)

Stable Mates is a split album by A. K. Salim and Yusef Lateef recorded in 1957 for the Savoy label.

== Reception ==
Professional ratings
Review scores
Source	Rating
AllMusic	4.5/5 stars

AllMusic awarded the album 4½ stars.

== Track listing ==
Side One: All compositions by Yusef Lateef

1. "Beauregard" - 3:20
2. "Ameena" - 7:00
3. "G' Bouk" - 10:00

Side Two: All compositions by A. K. Salim

1. "A Private Cloud" - 4:40
2. "Dejeuner" - 6:20
3. "Black Talk" - 3:38
4. "D Minor Dipper" - 5:16

== Personnel ==
Side One:

- Yusef Lateef - tenor saxophone, flute, arghul, percussion
- Curtis Fuller - trombone
- Hugh Lawson - piano
- Ernie Farrow - bass, rebab
- Louis Hayes - drums, percussion

Side Two:

- A. K. Salim - arranger, director
- Johnny Coles - trumpet
- Buster Cooper - trombone
- Johnny Griffin - tenor saxophone
- Howard Austin - baritone saxophone
- Tommy Flanagan - piano
- Kenny Burrell - guitar
- George Duvivier - bass
- Osie Johnson - drums
