= Pretty for the People =

Studio album by A. K. Salim
- Released: February 1958
- Recorded: September 17, 1957
- Studio: Van Gelder Studio, Hackensack, New Jersey
- Genre: Jazz
- Length: 39:32 Original LP
- Label: Savoy; MG 12118
- Producer: Ozzie Cadena

A. K. Salim chronology
Stable Mates (1957)	Pretty for the People (1958)	Blues Suite (1958)

Pretty for the People is an album by American jazz composer and arranger A. K. Salim featuring Kenny Dorham and Johnny Griffin recorded in 1957 for the Savoy label.

== Reception ==
Professional ratings
Review scores
Source	Rating
Allmusic	3/5 stars

Allmusic awarded the album 3 stars

== Track listing ==
All compositions by A. K. Salim

1. "Blu-Binsky" - 6:12
2. "R.U.1.2." - 8:00
3. "Shirley Ray" - 6:03
4. "Ba-Lu-Ee-Du" - 5:48
5. "Pretty for the People" - 8:05
6. "Takin' Care of Business" - 5:24
7. "Blu-Binsky" [Alternate Take] - 6:02 Bonus track on CD reissue
8. "Pretty for the People" [Alternate Take] - 8:29 Bonus track on CD reissue

== Personnel ==
- A. K. Salim - arranger, director
- Kenny Dorham - trumpet
- Buster Cooper - trombone
- Johnny Griffin - tenor saxophone
- Pepper Adams - baritone saxophone, tenor saxophone
- Wynton Kelly - piano
- Paul Chambers - bass
- Max Roach - drums
- Chino Pozo - congas
