= Lateef at Cranbrook =

Live album by Yusef Lateef
- Released: 1958
- Recorded: April 8, 1958
- Venue: Cranbrook Academy of Art, Detroit, Michigan
- Genre: Jazz
- Length: 36:38
- Label: Argo; LP 634
- Producer: Dave Usher

Yusef Lateef chronology
Other Sounds (1957)	Lateef at Cranbrook (1958)	The Dreamer (1959)

Lateef at Cranbrook (also reissued as Yusef Lateef) is a live album by multi-instrumentalist Yusef Lateef recorded in 1958 at the Cranbrook Academy of Art and released on the Argo label.

== Reception ==
Professional ratings
Review scores
Source	Rating
Allmusic	3/5 stars

The Allmusic site awarded the album 3 stars.

== Track listing ==
All compositions by Yusef Lateef except as indicated

1. "Morning" - 15:05
2. "Brazil" (Ary Barroso) - 2:54
3. "Let Every Soul Say Amen" - 3:57
4. "Woody N' You" (Dizzy Gillespie) - 14:42

== Personnel ==
- Yusef Lateef - tenor saxophone, flute, oboe, argol, percussion
- Frank Morelli - baritone saxophone
- Terry Pollard - piano
- William Austin - bass, rabat
- Frank Gant - drums, gong, finger cymbals
