= The Diverse Yusef Lateef =

Studio album by Yusef Lateef
- Released: January 15, 1970
- Recorded: April 1968 – May 1969
- Genre: Jazz fusion World fusion music
- Length: 27:49
- Label: Atlantic
- Producer: Joel Dorn

Yusef Lateef chronology
Yusef Lateef's Detroit (1969)	The Diverse Yusef Lateef (1970)	Suite 16 (1970)

Professional ratings
Review scores
Source	Rating
Allmusic	3/5 stars

The Diverse Yusef Lateef is a jazz album by saxophonist Yusef Lateef released in 1970. In it are mixed influences from rhythm and blues and soul music (particularly on "Live Humble") and world music (notably on "A Long Time Ago" or "Chandra").

== Track listing ==
All compositions by Yusef Lateef except as indicated.

1. "Live Humble" – 6:48
2. "A Long Time Ago" – 6:37
3. "Eboness" (Roy Brooks) – 4:44
4. "Chandra" – 9:37

== Personnel ==
- Yusef Lateef – tenor saxophone, track 1 - flute, 2–4 - bamboo flute, Chinese globular flute, Chinese Buddhist flute, kulintang, -track 2 Chinese cymbals, tambura, string arrangement
- Richard Tee – piano - track 1
- Chuck Rainey – Fender bass
- Cecil McBee – acoustic bass
- Ray Baretto – congas - track 1
- Bernard Purdie – drums, timbales
- Hugh Lawson – piano, 3 and 4 Indian bells - track 2
- Roy Brooks – drums, shofar, Chinese gong, large conga drum
- Selwart Clarke, Jesse Tryon, Alfred Brown, Kermit Moore – string quartet - track 4
- The Sweet Inspirations – vocal backgrounds - tracks 1 and 2
- Joel Dorn – producer
