= Ernie Farrow =

American jazz musician

Ernest Farrow (November 13, 1928 – July 14, 1969) was an American jazz musician, primarily a bassist. His half-sister was Alice Coltrane.

== Early life ==
Farrow was born in Huntington, West Virginia, on November 13, 1928. He started on piano before adding bass and drums. In his teens he had piano lessons from an uncle, Charles Lewis, who was a professional pianist. During high school he formed his own bands.

== Later life and career ==
Farrow's career as a professional musician began in the early 1950s, playing with Terry Gibbs in 1954 and Stan Getz the following year. He then played with Yusef Lateef, recording with him during the period 1957–64. For Lateef, he also played other instruments, including the rabat. Farrow performed in his own groups, and was bassist in pianist Red Garland's band in 1960. He died in a swimming accident on July 14, 1969.

== Discography ==
With Barry Harris

- Newer Than New (Riverside, 1961)

With Yusef Lateef

- Jazz for the Thinker (Savoy, 1957)
- Stable Mates (Savoy, 1957)
- Jazz Mood (Savoy, 1957)
- Before Dawn: The Music of Yusef Lateef (Verve, 1957)
- Jazz and the Sounds of Nature (Savoy, 1957)
- Prayer to the East (Savoy, 1957)
- The Sounds of Yusef (Prestige, 1957)
- Other Sounds (New Jazz, 1957)
- Cry! - Tender (New Jazz, 1957)
- Eastern Sounds (Prestige, 1961)
- Jazz 'Round the World (Impulse!, 1963)
- Live at Pep's (Impulse!, 1964)
