= Look Out for Evans Bradshaw! =

Studio album by Evans Bradshaw
- Released: 1958
- Recorded: June 9, 1958; Reeves Sound Studio, New York City
- Genre: Jazz
- Label: Riverside; RLP 12-263
- Producer: Orrin Keepnews

Evans Bradshaw chronology
Look Out for Evans Bradshaw! (1958)	Pieces of Eighty-Eight (1959)

Look Out for Evans Bradshaw! is the debut album by American jazz pianist Evans Bradshaw featuring tracks recorded in 1958 for the Riverside label.

== Reception ==
Professional ratings
Review scores
Source	Rating
Allmusic	3/5 stars

Allmusic awarded the album 3 stars.

== Track listing ==
1. "Georgia on My Mind" (Stuart Gorrell, Hoagy Carmichael) - 4:04
2. "Hallelujah!" (Vincent Youmans, Leo Robin, Clifford Grey) - 5:37
3. "The Prophet" (Evans Bradshaw) - 7:25
4. "Love for Sale" (Cole Porter) - 4:26
5. "Coolin’ the Blues" (Hampton Hawes) - 6:55
6. "Blueinet" (Zoot Sims) - 7:35
7. "Angel Eyes" (Earl Brent, Matt Dennis) - 4:58
8. "Old Devil Moon" (Yip Harburg, Burton Lane) - 2:53

== Personnel ==
- Evans Bradshaw - piano
- George Joyner - bass
- Philly Joe Jones - drums
