= Jazz Mood =

Studio album by Yusef Lateef
- Released: 1957
- Recorded: April 9, 1957; Van Gelder Studio, Hackensack, NJ
- Genre: Jazz
- Label: Savoy; MG 12103
- Producer: Ozzie Cadena

Yusef Lateef chronology
Stable Mates (1957)	Jazz Mood (1957)	Before Dawn: The Music of Yusef Lateef (1957)

Jazz Mood is the first released album by multi-instrumentalist Yusef Lateef recorded in 1957 and released on the Savoy label. The album was produced from Lateef's second recording session.

== Reception ==
Professional ratings
Review scores
Source	Rating
Allmusic	4.5/5 stars

The Allmusic site awarded the album 4½ stars.

== Track listing ==
All compositions by Yusef Lateef

1. "Metaphor" – 8:09
2. "Yusef's Mood" – 8:36
3. "The Beginning" – 4:13
4. "Morning" – 10:38
5. "Blues in Space" – 7:07

== Personnel ==
- Yusef Lateef – tenor saxophone, flute, track 1 – argol, intro track 1 – scraper
- Curtis Fuller – trombone, tambourine
- Hugh Lawson – piano
- Ernie Farrow – bass, rabat
- Louis Hayes – drums
- Doug Watkins – finger cymbals, percussion
