= Duet in Detroit =

1993 live album by drummer Roy Brooks

Live album by Roy Brooks
- Released: 1993
- Recorded: August 26, 1983; May 25, 1984; July 2, 1987; and February 25, 1989
- Venue: Detroit Institute of Arts
- Genre: Jazz
- Length: 68:56
- Label: Enja

Roy Brooks chronology
The Smart Set (1979)	Duet in Detroit (1993)

Duet in Detroit is a live album by the drummer Roy Brooks, recorded between 1983 and 1989 and released by Enja in 1993.

== Reception ==
Professional ratings
Review scores
Source	Rating
AllMusic	4/5 stars
The Penguin Guide to Jazz on Compact Disc	3.5/4 stars

AllMusic awarded the album 4 stars, with a review by Scott Yanow stating: "The music is full of surprises and generally holds one's interest with the trumpet-drums duets being the most unusual." Jazz Times called it an "exceptionally varied, satisfying collection." The Guardian deemed it "one of the enduring documents of Brooks's sensitivity to a variety of music approaches."

== Track listing ==
All compositions by Roy Brooks except as indicated

1. Introduction – 0:56
2. "Zulu" (Randy Weston) – 8:04
3. "Waltz for Sweetcakes" (Weston) – 6:20
4. "Elegy for Eddie Jefferson" (Roy Brooks, Woody Shaw) – 12:06
5. "Jeffuso" (Brooks, Shaw) – 2:27
6. Introduction – 0:37
7. "Forever Mingus" – 11:34
8. "Healing Force" (Don Pullen) – 14:52
9. "Samba del Sol" – 4:27
10. "Duet in Detroit" – 7:33

Recorded August 26, 1983 (#4, 5); May 25, 1984 (#1, 2, 3); July 2, 1987 (#6, 7, 8); February 25, 1989 (#9, 10).

== Personnel ==
- Roy Brooks – drums, percussion, musical saw
- Woody Shaw – trumpet (tracks 4 & 5)
- Geri Allen (tracks 9 & 10), Don Pullen (tracks 7 & 8), Randy Weston (tracks 2 & 3) – piano
