= The Centaur and the Phoenix =

Studio album by Yusef Lateef
- Released: 1960
- Recorded: October 4 and 6, 1960 (1–7); June 23, 1961 (8–9)
- Studio: Plaza Sound (New York City) (1–7); Bell Sound (New York City) (8–9)
- Genre: Hard bop, modal jazz
- Length: 42:24
- Label: Riverside; RLP 337
- Producer: Orrin Keepnews

Yusef Lateef chronology
The Three Faces of Yusef Lateef (1959)	The Centaur and the Phoenix (1960)	Lost in Sound (1961)

The Centaur and the Phoenix is an album by multi-instrumentalist Yusef Lateef, recorded in 1960 and released on the Riverside label.

== Reception ==
Professional ratings
Review scores
Source	Rating
AllMusic	4/5 stars
DownBeat	4.5/5 stars
The Penguin Guide to Jazz Recordings	3.5/4 stars

The AllMusic review by Stacia Proefrock stated that the performance "takes the risks and the innovations that Lateef was known for, and expands them in a number of different directions all at once, leading to an album that bursts with new ideas and textures, while remaining accessible, and above all, beautiful. Lateef seems eager here to take the next step musically by breaking the mold of his previous albums".

Don DeMicheal gave the album 4.5 stars in his review for DownBeat. He wrote, "What makes this album outstanding is that the playing and writing are equally strong. Usually, one or the other dominates... The album is a mature statement by a mature artist".

== Track listing ==
All compositions by Yusef Lateef except as indicated

1. "Revelation" (Kenny Barron) - 6:02
2. "Apathy" - 5:25
3. "Ev'ry Day (I Fall in Love)" (Sammy Fain, Irving Kahal) - 6:59
4. "The Centaur and the Phoenix" (Charles Mills) - 5:37
5. "Iqbal" - 4:51
6. "Summer Song" (Mills) - 5:26
7. "The Philanthropist" - 4:02

Bonus tracks on CD reissue:

1. "Jungle Fantasy" (Esy Morales) - 2:42
2. "Titora" (Billy Taylor) - 2:25

== Personnel ==
- Yusef Lateef - tenor saxophone, flute, arghul, oboe
- Richard Williams - trumpet
- Clark Terry - flugelhorn, trumpet
- Curtis Fuller - trombone
- Josea Taylor - bassoon
- Tate Houston - baritone saxophone
- Joe Zawinul - piano
- Ben Tucker - bass
- Lex Humphries - drums
- Kenny Barron - arranger
