= A Flat, G Flat and C =

Studio album by Yusef Lateef
- Released: August 1966
- Recorded: March 8–9, 1966
- Studio: Van Gelder Studio, Englewood Cliffs, NJ
- Genre: Jazz
- Length: 37:29
- Label: Impulse!
- Producer: Bob Thiele

Yusef Lateef chronology
Psychicemotus (1965)	A Flat, G Flat and C (1966)	The Golden Flute (1966)

A Flat, G Flat and C is an album by American jazz multi-instrumentalist Yusef Lateef, featuring performances recorded in 1966 for the Impulse! label.

== Reception ==
Professional ratings
Review scores
Source	Rating
Allmusic	link

The Allmusic review by Scott Yanow stated:

Yusef Lateef (heard on tenor, alto, flute, oboe and the mysterious-sounding theremin) is in explorative and consistently colorful form... Lateef performs ten songs (eight are his originals) that are all at least in abstract form related to the blues. Well worth several listens.

== Track listing ==
All tracks are written by Yusef Lateef.

No.	Title	Length
1.	"Warm Hearted Blues"	4:34
2.	"Nile Valley Blues"	3:45
3.	"Robbie"	2:40
4.	"Psyche Rose"	2:31
5.	"Chuen Blues"	4:45
6.	"Feather Comfort"	5:16
7.	"Blind Willie"	2:40
8.	"Feelin' Alright"	3:07
9.	"Sound Wave"	3:57
10.	"Kyoto Blues"	4:14

== Personnel ==
- Yusef Lateef – tenor saxophone, alto saxophone, flute, oboe, chuen, theremin
- Hugh Lawson – piano
- Reggie Workman – bass
- Roy Brooks – drums
