= Suite 16 (album) =

Studio album by Yusef Lateef
- Released: November 2, 1970
- Recorded: April 6–9, 1970; Regent Sound Studios, New York City; June 24, 1970; Corner Studios, Cologne
- Genre: Jazz
- Length: 34:54
- Labels: Atlantic; SD 1563
- Producer: Joel Dorn

Yusef Lateef chronology
| The Diverse Yusef Lateef (1969) | Suite 16 (1970) | The Gentle Giant (1970) |

Professional ratings
Review scores
| Source | Rating |
|---|---|
| Allmusic | 2/5 stars |

Suite 16 is an album by multi-instrumentalist Yusef Lateef recorded in 1970 and released on the Atlantic label.

== Track listing ==
All compositions by Yusef Lateef except as indicated.

1. "Buddy and Lou" - 3:13
2. "Down in Atlanta" - 4:15
3. "Nocturne" - 4:02
4. "When a Man Loves a Woman" (Calvin Lewis, Andrew Wright) - 3:20
5. "Michelle" (John Lennon, Paul McCartney) - 1:44
6. "Symphonic Blues Suite: First Movement; Folia" - 2:21
7. "Symphonic Blues Suite: Second Movement; Minuet (Hybrid, Atonal)" - 2:10
8. "Symphonic Blues Suite: Third Movement; Blues (Twelve Measure Form) Variational Interlude" - 6:53
9. "Symphonic Blues Suite: Fourth Movement; Passacaglia" - 2:06
10. "Symphonic Blues Suite: Fifth Movement; Chorale / Sixth Movement; Blues (Extended Form)" - 2:13
11. "Symphonic Blues Suite: Seventh Movement; Blues, Coda" - 2:37
- Recorded at Regent Sound Studios in New York City on April 6, 1970 (track 3), April 7, 1970 (track 4), April 8, 1970 (track 1), and April 9, 1970 (track 2) and at Corner Studios in Cologne, West Germany on June 24, 1970 (tracks 5–10)

== Personnel ==
- Yusef Lateef - tenor saxophone, flute, bamboo flute, pneumatic bamboo flute, oboe, bells, tambourine
- Neal Boyar - vibraphone (track 3)
- Joe Zawinul (tracks 1–4) - piano
- Barry Harris (tracks 6–11) - piano
- Eric Gale (tracks 1–5) - guitar
- Earl Klugh (track 5) - guitar
- Chuck Rainey - electric bass (tracks 1–4)
- Robert Cunningham - bass, electric bass (tracks 6–11)
- Albert Heath (tracks 6–11), Jimmy Johnson (tracks 1–4) - drums
- Selwart Clarke - viola (tracks 2 & 4)
- Kermit Moore - cello (tracks 2 & 4)
- Cologne Radio Orchestra conducted by William S. Fischer (tracks 6–11)
- The Sweet Inspirations - backing vocals (tracks 1–5)
