= The Doctor Is In... and Out =

The Doctor is In... and Out

Studio album by Yusef Lateef
- Released: 1976
- Recorded: March 1976
- Studio: Regent Sound Studios, New York City
- Genre: Jazz
- Length: 43:24
- Label: Atlantic; SD 1685
- Producer: Joel Dorn

Yusef Lateef chronology
| 10 Years Hence (1974) | The Doctor is In... and Out (1976) | Autophysiopsychic (1977) |

The Doctor is In... and Out is an album by multi-instrumentalist Yusef Lateef recorded in 1976 and released on the Atlantic label.

== Reception ==
Professional ratings
Review scores
| Source | Rating |
|---|---|
| Allmusic | 4.5/5 stars |

Allmusic awarded the album 4½ stars with the review by Thom Jurek calling it "a weird and wonderful record".

== Track listing ==
All compositions by Yusef Lateef except as indicated

1. "The Improvisers" - 7:55
2. "Hellbound" (Kenny Barron) - 6:38
3. "Mystique" (Barron) - 7:42
4. "Mississippi Mud" - 2:53
5. "Mushmouth" (Barron) - 6:28
6. "Technological Homosapien" - 5:19
7. "Street Musicians" - 2:57
8. "In a Little Spanish Town ('Twas on a Night Like This)" (Sam M. Lewis, Mabel Wayne, Joe Young) - 3:26

== Personnel ==
- Yusef Lateef – alto saxophone, tenor saxophone, oboe, flute, bamboo flute
- Kenny Barron – keyboards
- Leonard Goines –
- Joe Wilder – trumpet
- Jack Jeffers - trombone
- Jim Buffington – French horn
- Jonathan Dorn – tuba
- Dana McCurdy – ARP 2500
- Billy Butler – guitar
- Bob Cunningham – bass
- Ron Carter – bass
- Anthony Jackson – bass
- Al Foster – drums
- Dom Um Romao – percussion
- Judy Clay – backing vocals
- Cissy Houston – backing vocals
- Bob Cunningham – narration (track 6)
- David Nadien – violin (track 7)
