= Jazz for the Thinker =

Studio album by Yusef Lateef
- Released: 1957
- Recorded: April 5, 1957; New York City
- Genre: Jazz
- Label: Savoy; MG 12109
- Producer: Ozzie Cadena

Yusef Lateef chronology
Jazz for the Thinker (1957)	Stable Mates (1957)

Jazz for the Thinker is the debut album by multi-instrumentalist Yusef Lateef recorded in 1957 and released on the Savoy label. The album was produced from Lateef's earliest recording session and was the second album released under his leadership.

== Reception ==
Professional ratings
Review scores
Source	Rating
Allmusic	3/5 stars

The Allmusic site awarded the album 3 stars.

== Track listing ==
All compositions by Yusef Lateef

1. "Happyology" – 10:50
2. "O' Blues" – 9:00
3. "Midday" – 7:46
4. "Polarity" – 6:58
5. "Space" – 5:48

== Personnel ==
- Yusef Lateef – tenor saxophone, flute, arghul, scraper, vocalizing
- Curtis Fuller – trombone, tambourine
- Hugh Lawson – piano
- Ernie Farrow – bass, rabat
- Louis Hayes – drums
- Doug Watkins – finger cymbals, percussion
