= In a Temple Garden =

Studio album by Yusef Lateef
- Released: 1979
- Recorded: May 1979
- Studios: Van Gelder, Englewood Cliffs, New Jersey
- Genre: Jazz
- Length: 37:55
- Labels: CTI; CTI 7088
- Producer: Creed Taylor

Yusef Lateef chronology
Autophysiopsychic (1977)	In a Temple Garden (1979)	Hikima: Creativity (1983)

In a Temple Garden is an album by American multi-instrumentalist and composer Yusef Lateef, recorded in 1979 and released on the CTI label.

== Critical reception ==
Professional ratings
Review scores
Source	Rating
AllMusic	3/5 stars
DownBeat	4/5 stars

The Bangor Daily News deemed the music "an innovative blend of jazz fusion." The Edmonton Journal called the album "a genuine abomination, with few redeeming moments."

== Track listing ==
All compositions by Jeremy Wall except where noted.

1. "In a Temple Garden" – 5:15
2. "Bismillah" – 4:06
3. "Confirmation" – 6:53
4. "Nayaz" – 3:02
5. "Jeremiah" – 6:27
6. "Honky Tonk" (Bill Doggett) – 3:55
7. "How I Loved You" (Yusef Lateef) – 3:55
8. "Morocco" – 4:22

== Personnel ==
- Yusef Lateef – flute, tenor saxophone, vocals
- Randy Brecker – trumpet
- Jim Pugh – trombone, bass trombone
- Michael Brecker – tenor saxophone
- Jerry Dodgion – alto saxophone
- Tom Schuman – piano, electric piano, synthesizer
- Jeremy Wall – keyboards, percussion, piano, synthesizer, arranger
- Eric Gale – guitar
- Will Lee – bass
- Steve Gadd, Jimmy Madison – drums
- Thomas Bayer – synthesizer drums
- Ray Barretto, Sammy Figueroa – percussion
- Suzanne Ciani – synthesizer programming
