= The Fabric of Jazz =

Studio album by Yusef Lateef
- Released: 1959
- Recorded: June 11, 1959
- Studio: Van Gelder, Hackensack, New Jersey
- Genre: Jazz
- Label: Savoy; MG 12140
- Producer: Ozzie Cadena

Yusef Lateef chronology
| The Dreamer (1959) | The Fabric of Jazz (1959) | Cry! – Tender (1959) |

The Fabric of Jazz is an album by multi-instrumentalist Yusef Lateef, recorded in 1959 and released on the Savoy label.

== Reception ==
Professional ratings
Review scores
| Source | Rating |
|---|---|
| AllMusic | 3/5 stars |
| DownBeat | 2.5/5 stars |

A review in the British Gramophone magazine stated: "When the mood takes him, Lateef can rip through tile choruses, eating up the chord changes like a man with only minutes to live, but most of the time he is more concerned in using his considerable instrumental technique to its best advantage and displaying one of the most gorgeous tenor saxophone tones since Don Byas".

== Track listing ==
All compositions by Yusef Lateef except as indicated

1. "Moon Tree" - 5:48
2. "Stella by Starlight" (Ned Washington, Victor Young) - 5:51
3. "Valse Bouk" - 4:19
4. "Half Breed" (Abe Woodley) - 8:37
5. "Poor Butterfly" (John Golden, Raymond Hubbell) - 6:38

== Personnel ==
- Yusef Lateef - tenor saxophone, flute track 5
- Bernard McKinney - euphonium except track 5
- Terry Pollard - piano
- William Austin - bass, rabat
- Frank Gant - drums, percussion
