= Roy Brooks =

American drummer (1938–2005)

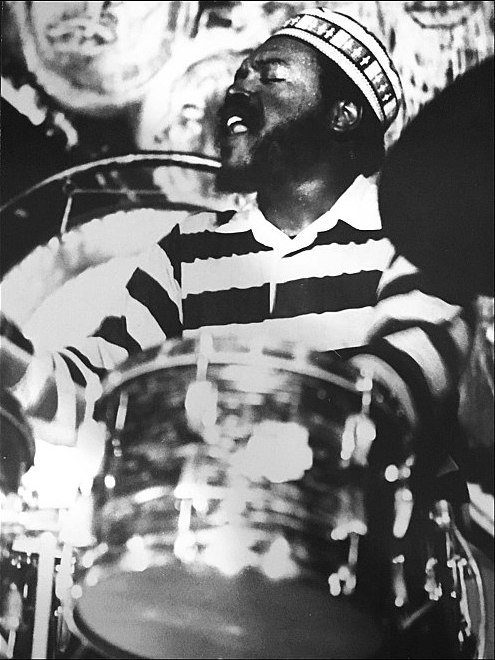

Background information
- Born: March 9, 1938; Detroit, Michigan, United States
- Died: November 15, 2005 (aged 67) Detroit
- Genres: Jazz
- Occupation: Musician
- Instrument: Drums
- Formerly of: Barry Harris, Beans Bowles, Blue Mitchell, Charles McPherson, Chet Baker, Dexter Gordon, Four Tops, Horace Silver, Junior Cook, Lee Morgan, Pharoah Sanders, Sonny Stitt, Wes Montgomery

Roy Brooks (March 9, 1938 – November 15, 2005) was an American jazz drummer.

== Biography ==
=== Early life ===
Brooks was born in Detroit and drummed since childhood, his earliest experiences of music coming through his mother, who sang in church. He was an outstanding varsity basketball player as a teenager and was offered a scholarship to the Detroit Institute of Technology; he attended the school for three semesters and then dropped out to tour with Yusef Lateef.

=== Career ===
After time with Lateef and Barry Harris, he played with Beans Bowles and with the Four Tops in Las Vegas. He played with Horace Silver from 1959 to 1964, including on the album Song for My Father; in 1963 he released his first album as a leader. Following this he freelanced in New York City through the 1960s and early 1970s, playing with Lateef again (1967–70), Sonny Stitt, Lee Morgan, Dexter Gordon, Chet Baker, Junior Cook, Blue Mitchell, Charles McPherson, Pharoah Sanders (1970), Wes Montgomery, Dollar Brand, Jackie McLean, James Moody (1970–72), Charles Mingus (1972–73), and Milt Jackson. He married Hermine Brooks in 1967. His 1970 album The Free Slave featured Cecil McBee and Woody Shaw. Later in 1970 he joined Max Roach's ensemble M'Boom, and in 1972 put together the ensemble The Artistic Truth.

Roy Brooks in later years

Brooks's performances often included unusual instruments such as the musical saw and drums with vacuum tubes set up so as to regulate the pitch. He began to acquire a reputation for bizarre behavior on and off stage, and occasionally sought treatment for mental disorders. In 1975 he left New York and returned to Detroit, and began using lithium to regulate his behavior. In the 1980s he returned to The Artistic Truth and gigged regularly in Detroit with Kenny Cox, Harold McKinney, and Wendell Harrison. With those three he co-founded M.U.S.I.C. (Musicians United to Save Indigenous Culture), and later also founded the Aboriginal Percussion Choir, an ensemble devoted to the use of non-Western percussion instruments. He used his basement as a practice and learning space, working with children as well as accomplished musicians.

In the 1990s Detroit's jazz scene waned, and Brooks ceased taking medication; he again began breaking down at gigs, and in 1994 was institutionalized for three weeks. In 1997, he threatened his neighbor with a shotgun during a dispute over a lost set of house keys. He was charged with assault but was declared mentally unfit to stand trial and was sentenced to mental treatment; however, he missed many of his appointments, and in 1999 he threatened another neighbor with a bullwhip and a machete over property rights to an adjacent vacant lot. Sentenced to further psychiatric treatment, he disappeared again, and when probation officers found him, he was imprisoned late in 2000. He served time at Marquette Prison until 2004, when he was placed in a nursing home where he died in late 2005.

=== Posthumous albums ===
In June 2011, Sagittarius A-Star Records of Italy released a vinyl LP entitled Roy Brooks & the Improvisational Sphere, recorded by Charles Jazzrenegade Wood on September 3, 1999 Live at Lelli's, a well known Italian restaurant in Detroit. This is the sole available recording of this innovative select group assembled by Roy Brooks as the Improvisational Sphere for the three-day performance run at Lelli's. Personnel: Roy Brooks: Drums, Marimba, Steel Drum, Keyboard; Amina Claudine Myers: Hammond B-3 Organ and Vocals; Ray Mantilla: Congas, Bells, Percussion; Jerry LeDuff: Tabla, Cuica, Shekere, Berimbau, Percussion; Rodney Rich: Guitar. This recording was released with thanks and the approval of Hermine Brooks and Raheem Brooks.

In 2021, the Reel To Real label released Understanding, a two-CD live recording from 1970 featuring Brooks with saxophonist Carlos Garnett, trumpeter Woody Shaw, pianist Harold Mabern, and bassist Cecil McBee.

== Discography ==
=== As leader ===
- Beat (Workshop Jazz, 1963)
- The Free Slave (Muse, 1970)
- Understanding (Reel To Real, 1970 [2021])- with Carlos Garnett, Woody Shaw, Harold Mabern, and Cecil McBee
- Ethnic Expressions (Im-Hotep, 1973)
- Black Survival: The Sahel Concert at Town Hall (Im-Hotep, 1974)
- Live at Town Hall (Baystate, 1978)
- The Smart Set (Baystate, 1979)
- Duet in Detroit (Enja, 1993) - with Woody Shaw, Don Pullen, Geri Allen and Randy Weston
- Roy Brooks & the Improvisational Sphere (Sagittarius A-Star, 2011) - with Amina Claudine Myers, Ray Mantilla, Jerry LeDuff and Rodney Rich

=== As sideman ===
With Chet Baker

- Smokin' with the Chet Baker Quintet (Prestige, 1965)
- Groovin' with the Chet Baker Quintet (Prestige, 1965)
- Comin' On with the Chet Baker Quintet (Prestige, 1965)
- Cool Burnin' with the Chet Baker Quintet (Prestige, 1965)
- Boppin' with the Chet Baker Quintet (Prestige, 1965)

With Junior Cook

- Junior's Cookin' (Jazzland, 1961)

With Red Garland

- Auf Wiedersehen (MPS, 1971 [1975])

With Dexter Gordon

- The Jumpin' Blues (Prestige, 1970)

With Abdullah Ibrahim

- Banyana - Children of Africa (1976)
- The Children of Africa (Enja, 1976)
- Buddy Tate Meets Dollar Brand (Chiaroscuro Records, 1977) with Buddy Tate
- The Journey (Chiaroscuro Records, 1977)

With Yusef Lateef

- A Flat, G Flat and C (1966, Impulse!)
- The Golden Flute (Impulse!, 1966)
- The Complete Yusef Lateef (Atlantic, 1967)
- The Blue Yusef Lateef (Atlantic, 1968)
- Yusef Lateef's Detroit (Atlantic, 1969)
- The Diverse Yusef Lateef (1970)

With M'Boom / with Max Roach

- Re: Percussion (Strata-East, 1973)
- M'Boom (Columbia, 1979)
- Collage (Soul Note, 1984)
- To the Max! (Enja, 1990–91)

With Charles McPherson

- McPherson's Mood (Prestige, 1969)

With Blue Mitchell

- Blue's Moods (Riverside, 1960)
- The Cup Bearers (Riverside, 1962)
- Step Lightly (Blue Note, 1963)

With David Newman

- Newmanism (Atlantic, 1974)

With Sonny Red

- Out of the Blue (Blue Note, 1960)

With Red Rodney

- Bird Lives! (Muse, 1973)
- Bluebird (Camden, 1973–81)

With Hilton Ruiz

- Excition (SteepleChase, 1977)
- Steppin' Into Beauty (SteepleChase, 1977 [1982])

With Shirley Scott

- Happy Talk (Prestige, 1962)
- Drag 'em Out (Prestige, 1963)

With Woody Shaw

- Bemsha Swing (Blue Note, 1986 [1997])

With Horace Silver

- Horace-Scope (1960)
- Doin' the Thing (1961)
- Silver's Serenade (1963)
- Song for My Father (1963)

With Sonny Stitt

- Pow! (Prestige, 1965 [1967])
- Constellation (Cobblestone, 1972)
- Keeper of the Flame (Camden, 1971–73)
- The Champ (1973)

With Buddy Tate

- Groovin' with Buddy Tate (Swingville, 1961)
- Buddy Tate Meets Dollar Brand (Chiaroscuro, 1977) with Dollar Brand

With John Wright

- Makin' Out (Prestige, 1961)
