= Lost in Sound =

Studio album by Yusef Lateef
- Released: November 1962
- Recorded: August 14, 1961
- Studio: Peter Ind, New York City.
- Genre: Hard bop
- Length: 33:37
- Label: Charlie Parker PLP-814-S
- Producer: Aubrey Mayhew

Yusef Lateef chronology
The Centaur and the Phoenix (1960)	Lost in Sound (1962)	Eastern Sounds (1962)

Professional ratings
Review scores
Source	Rating
AllMusic	3/5 stars
The Penguin Guide to Jazz Recordings	2.5/4 stars

Lost in Sound is a studio album by American multi-instrumentalist Yusef Lateef, released in 1962 by the Charlie Parker label. This record is the Yusef Lateef's only album for the label. Since its initial release, the album has been re-released several times via multiple labels.

== Track listing ==
No.	Title	Writer(s)	Length
1.	"Outside Blues"	Vincent Pitts	3:15
2.	"Soul Blues"	Pitts	3:28
3.	"Blue Rocky"	Pitts	4:30
4.	"Dexterity"	Charlie Parker	6:07
5.	"Trudy's Delight"	Pitts	4:17
6.	"Introlude"	Pitts	4:12
7.	"Train Stop"	Pitts	4:04
8.	"Big Foot"	Parker	3:44
Total length:			33:37

== Personnel ==
Musicians

- Yusef Lateef – tenor saxophone
- Ray McKinny – bass
- Clifford Jarvis – drums (tracks: 1, 2, 4–6, 8)
- George Scott – drums (tracks: 3, 7)
- Vincent Pitts – trumpet
- John Harmon – piano

Production

- Peter Ind – engineer
- Doris Parker – liner notes
- Aubrey Mayhew – producer
