= The Three Faces of Yusef Lateef =

Studio album by Yusef Lateef
- Released: June 1960
- Recorded: May 9, 1960; New York City
- Genre: Jazz
- Length: 42:24
- Label: Riverside; RLP 325
- Producer: Orrin Keepnews

Yusef Lateef chronology
Cry! – Tender (1959)	The Three Faces of Yusef Lateef (1960)	The Centaur and the Phoenix (1960)

The Three Faces of Yusef Lateef is an album by multi-instrumentalist Yusef Lateef recorded in 1960 and released on the Riverside label.

== Reception ==
Professional ratings
Review scores
Source	Rating
Allmusic	4.5/5 stars

The Allmusic review by Stacia Proefrock states: "Not quite as expansive or daring as much of Lateef's other recordings, The Three Faces of Yusef Lateef still documents a fine musician at work during the peak of his career".

== Track listing ==
All compositions by Yusef Lateef except as indicated

1. "Goin' Home" (Antonín Dvořák, William Arms Fisher) - 5:02
2. "I'm Just a Lucky So-and-So" (Duke Ellington, Mack David) - 4:35
3. "Quarantine" (Abe Woodley) - 7:00
4. "From Within" - 4:11
5. "Salt Water Blues" - 6:47
6. "Lateef Minor 7th" (Joe Zawinul) - 4:58
7. "Adoration" - 4:31
8. "Ma (He's Making Eyes at Me)" (Sidney Clare, Con Conrad) - 4:56

== Personnel ==
- Yusef Lateef - tenor saxophone (tracks 1, 3 & 8), oboe (tracks 2 & 5), flute (tracks 4, 6 & 7)
- Hugh Lawson - piano, celeste
- Ron Carter - cello (tracks 1, 2 & 4–7)
- Herman Wright - bass
- Lex Humphries - drums, timpani
