= Psychicemotus =

Studio album by Yusef Lateef
- Released: January 1966
- Recorded: July 21–22, 1965
- Studio: Van Gelder Studio, Englewood Cliffs, NJ
- Genre: Jazz
- Length: 39:41
- Label: Impulse!
- Producer: Bob Thiele

Yusef Lateef chronology
1984 (1965)	Psychicemotus (1966)	A Flat, G Flat and C (1966)

Professional ratings
Review scores
Source	Rating
Allmusic	3.5/5 stars
The Penguin Guide to Jazz Recordings	3/4 stars

Psychicemotus is a 1965 album by Yusef Lateef.

== Track listing ==
1. "Psychicemotus" (Yusef Lateef) – 5:05
2. "Bamboo Flute Blues" (Lateef) – 4:02
3. "Semiocto" (Lateef) – 4:31
4. "Why Do I Love You?" (Oscar Hammerstein II, Jerome Kern) – 6:32
5. "First Gymnopédie" (Erik Satie) – 3:29
6. "Medula Sonata" (Lateef) – 6:35
7. "I'll Always Be in Love with You" (Bud Green, Harry Ruby, Sam H. Stept) – 4:42
8. "Ain't Misbehavin'" (Brooks, Andy Razaf, Fats Waller) – 4:45

== Personnel ==
Musicians

- Yusef Lateef – flute, percussion, arranger, oboe, tenor saxophone, tambourine, chinese flutes, bamboo flute
- Georges Arvanitas – piano
- Reggie Workman – double bass
- James Black – drums, percussion, indian bells
