= The Dreamer (Yusef Lateef album) =

Studio album by Yusef Lateef
- Released: 1959
- Recorded: June 11, 1959
- Studio: Van Gelder Studio, Hackensack, New Jersey
- Genre: Jazz
- Label: Savoy; MG 12139
- Producer: Ozzie Cadena

Yusef Lateef chronology
Lateef at Cranbrook (1958)	The Dreamer (1959)	The Fabric of Jazz (1959)

The Dreamer is an album by multi-instrumentalist Yusef Lateef recorded in 1959 and released on the Savoy label.

== Reception ==
Professional ratings
Review scores
Source	Rating
Allmusic	4/5 stars

A review in the British Gramophone magazine stated: "a great deal of his passionate, richtoned saxophone work can be heard here".

== Track listing ==
All compositions by Yusef Lateef except as indicated

1. "Oboe Blues" - 5:49
2. "Angel Eyes" (Earl Brent, Matt Dennis) - 5:13
3. "The Dreamer" - 6:53
4. "Arjuna" - 7:39
5. "Can't Help Lovin' Dat Man" (Oscar Hammerstein II, Jerome Kern) - 8:02

== Personnel ==
- Yusef Lateef - tenor saxophone, oboe - track 1
- Bernard McKinney - euphonium
- Terry Pollard - piano
- William Austin - bass, rabat
- Frank Gant - drums, percussion
