= Four (Joe Henderson album) =

Live album by Joe Henderson
- Released: November 1994
- Recorded: April 21, 1968
- Genre: Jazz
- Length: 71:37
- Label: Verve

Joe Henderson chronology
Tetragon (1968)	Four (1994)	Straight, No Chaser (1994)

Professional ratings
Review scores
Source	Rating
Allmusic	4.5/5 stars

Four is an album by jazz saxophonist Joe Henderson, recorded on April 21, 1968, but only released in 1994 by the Verve label. It features a live performance by Henderson with pianist Wynton Kelly, bassist Paul Chambers and drummer Jimmy Cobb. The Allmusic review by Scott Yanow states: "Henderson really pushes the rhythm section (which, although they had not played with the tenor previously, had been together for a decade) and he is certainly inspired by their presence. This is a frequently exciting performance by some of the modern bop greats of the era". Further selections from this concert were released as Straight, No Chaser.

== Track listing ==
1. "Autumn Leaves" (Kosma, Prévert, Mercer) – 13:37
2. "Four" (Davis) – 12:16
3. "On the Trail" (Grofe) – 14:55
4. "Stardust/Old Folks" (Carmichael, Parish/Robison, Hill) – 11:47
5. "On Green Dolphin Street" (Washington, Kaper) – 16:05
6. "The Theme" (Davis) – 2:57
  - Recorded at Left Bank Jazz Society, Baltimore, MD on April 21, 1968

== Personnel ==
- Joe Henderson – tenor saxophone
- Wynton Kelly – piano
- Paul Chambers – bass
- Jimmy Cobb – drums
