= The Gentle Giant =

Studio album by Yusef Lateef
- Released: January/February 1972
- Recorded: April 7 & 9, 1970; September 1–2, 1971
- Studio: Regent Sound Studios & Atlantic Recording Studios, New York City
- Genre: Jazz, Jazz Fusion
- Length: 38:39
- Label: Atlantic; SD 1602
- Producer: Joel Dorn

Yusef Lateef chronology
Suite 16 (1970)	The Gentle Giant (1972)	Hush 'N' Thunder (1972)

The Gentle Giant is an album by multi-instrumentalist Yusef Lateef recorded in 1970 and 1971 and released on the Atlantic label.

== Reception ==
Professional ratings
Review scores
Source	Rating
Allmusic	3/5 stars

Allmusic awarded the album 3 stars with the review by Michael G. Nastos stating, "While inconsistent and at times uneven, there's more to praise than damn in the grooves and unique musicianship he offers with this small ensemble of focused and singular-minded players... this album is clear evidence of how great a musician Yusef Lateef was, but not in the context of his best music".

== Track listing ==
All compositions by Yusef Lateef except as indicated

1. "Nubian Lady" (Kenny Barron) - 6:39
2. "Lowland Lullabye" (Traditional) - 2:23
3. "Hey Jude" (John Lennon, Paul McCartney) - 9:01
4. "Jungle Plum" (Barron) - 4:33
5. "The Poor Fisherman" - 3:41
6. "African Song" (Barron) - 3:50
7. "Queen of the Night" - 2:13
8. "Below Yellow Bell" - 5:07
- Recorded at Regent Sound Studios in New York City on April 7, 1970 (track 3) and April 9, 1970 (track 7) and at Atlantic Recording Studios in New York City on September 1, 1971 (tracks 2, 5 & 6) and September 2, 1971 (tracks 1, 4 & 8)

== Personnel ==
- Yusef Lateef - tenor saxophone, flute, bamboo flute, pneumatic bamboo flute, oboe, bells, tambourine
- Eric Gale - guitar (tracks 3 & 7)
- Neal Boyar - vibraphone, chimes (track 3)
- Chuck Rainey - electric bass (tracks 3 & 7)
- Albert Heath - drums, flute (tracks 1, 2, 4–6 & 8)
- Jimmy Johnson - drums (tracks 3 & 7)
- The Sweet Inspirations - backing vocals (track 3)
- Kermit Moore - cello (track 2)
- Kenny Barron, Ray Bryant - piano, electric piano (tracks 1, 4, 6 & 8)
- Bob Cunningham, Sam Jones - bass (tracks 1, 4, 6 & 8)
- Bill Salter - electric bass (tracks 1, 4, 6 & 8)
- Ladji Camara - African percussion (track 1, 4, 6 & 8)
