= Frank Gant =

American drummer

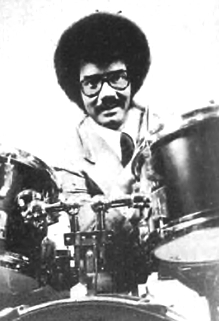
- Jazz drummer Frank Gant in a 1976 DownBeat advertisement

Background information
- Born: May 26, 1931; Detroit, Michigan
- Died: July 19, 2021 (aged 90)
- Occupation: Jazz musician
- Instrument: Drums

Frank Gant (May 26, 1931- July 19, 2021) was an American jazz drummer.

Gant, a native of Detroit, Michigan, recorded with Donald Byrd, Sonny Stitt, and extensively with Yusef Lateef in the late 1950s. He then worked with Red Garland before joining Ahmad Jamal's trio (1966-1976).

His first gigs were with Billy Mitchell and Pepper Adams. After working with Little John Wilson and his Merry Men at the Madison Ballroom including four days backing Billie Holiday, Gant joined Alvin Jackson's house band at the Blue Bird.

As the house drummer at Detroit's Club 12, with Jackson's band, he backed Thelonious Monk and Charlie Rouse in September 1959.

In the 1970s, he accompanied Jamil Nasser and Harold Mabern as the rhythm section for workshops run by Cobi Narita.

== Discography ==
=== As sideman ===
With Sonny Stitt

- 1958: Sonny Stitt
- 1960: Burnin' (recorded 1958)

With Yusef Lateef

- 1958: Lateef at Cranbrook
- 1959: The Dreamer
- 1959: The Fabric of Jazz
- 1960: Cry! - Tender

With Red Garland

- 1962: The Nearness of You
- 1962: Solar
- 1984: Misty Red

With Ahmad Jamal

- 1966: Heat Wave
- 1968: Tranquility
- 1970: The Awakening
- 1971: Freeflight
- 1971: Outertimeinnerspace
- 1976: Recorded Live at Oil Can Harry's

With Al Haig

- 1977: Manhattan Memories (Sea Breeze, re. 1983)

With others

- 1955: Byrd Jazz – Donald Byrd
- 1958: Breakin' It Up – Barry Harris
- 1964: Proof Positive – J. J. Johnson (Impulse!)
- 1979: Monty Alexander in Tokyo – Monty Alexander with Gant and Andy Simpkins
- 1986: Moonray – Adam Makowicz with Gant, Jamil Nasser, Deborah Henson-Conant and Ed Saindon
