= Yusef Lateef's Detroit =

Yusef Lateef's Detroit Latitude 42° 30′ Longitude 83°

Studio album by Yusef Lateef
- Released: June 1969
- Recorded: February 4–5, 1969
- Studios: Century Sound, New York City
- Genre: Jazz
- Length: 31:02
- Labels: Atlantic; SD 1525
- Producer: Joel Dorn

Yusef Lateef chronology
The Blue Yusef Lateef (1968)	Yusef Lateef's Detroit Latitude 42° 30′ Longitude 83° (1969)	The Diverse Yusef Lateef (1969)

Yusef Lateef's Detroit (subtitled Latitude 42° 30′ Longitude 83°) is an album by multi-instrumentalist Yusef Lateef, recorded in 1969 (with one track from The Complete Yusef Lateef recording sessions in 1967) and released on the Atlantic label.

== Reception ==
Professional ratings
Review scores
Source	Rating
AllMusic	4/5 stars
The Penguin Guide to Jazz Recordings	2/4 stars

AllMusic reviewer Thom Jurek described it as "one of Lateef's most misunderstood recordings".

== Recording ==
The album was recorded at Century Sound, a small Detroit studio that typically produced commercial pop and disco records. Producer Joel Dorn sought to blend Lateef's jazz sound with Motown elements by combining two rhythm sections: Lateef's traditional jazz group and Atlantic Records' R&B musicians (including Eric Gale on guitar, Chuck Rainey on electric bass, and Bernard Purdie on drums). Initially, tension existed between the musicians due to their different playing styles, but during the sessions the two rhythm sections merged organically. According to Dorn, it was "one of the few times where oil and water produced a whole new liquid."

== Chart performance ==
The album debuted on Billboard magazine's Top LP's chart in the issue dated August 16, 1969, peaking at No. 183 during a five-week run on the chart.

== Track listing ==
All compositions by Yusef Lateef except as indicated

1. "Bishop School" – 3:00
2. "Livingston Playground" – 3:37
3. "Eastern Market" – 4:15
4. "Belle Isle" – 3:12
5. "Russell and Elliot" – 4:47
6. "Raymond Winchester" – 2:35
7. "Woodward Avenue" – 2:11
8. "That Lucky Old Sun" (Haven Gillespie, Beasley Smith) – 7:25
- Recorded at Century Sound Studios in New York City on February 4, 1969 (tracks 1, 4, 5 & 7), and February 5, 1969 (tracks 2, 3, & 6), and on June 1, 1967, in New York City (track 8)

== Record Store Day re-release ==
The album was re-released in the UK for Record Store Day on April 22, 2023, as a limited edition of 2,000 copies. It was selected by Giles Peterson from the Warner archive for re-release on his Arc Records label, it was re-mastered in mono from the original tapes by Bernie Grundman and pressed on 180-gram black vinyl. This is the only re-issue the album has had on vinyl since its original release in 1969.

== Personnel ==
- Yusef Lateef – alto saxophone, tenor saxophone, flute, oboe, vocals
- Thad Jones (tracks 1, 4, 5 & 7), Danny Moore (tracks 2, 3, & 6), Jimmy Owens (tracks 1–7), Snooky Young (tracks 1–7) – trumpet
- Eric Gale – guitar (tracks 1–7)
- Hugh Lawson – piano
- Cecil McBee – bass
- Chuck Rainey – electric bass (tracks 1–7)
- Bernard Purdie (tracks 1–7) – drums, Roy Brooks (track 8),
- Ray Barretto (tracks 1, 4, 5 & 7), Norman Pride (tracks 2, 3, & 6) – congas
- Albert Heath – percussion (tracks 1–7)
- Selwart Clarke, James Tryon – violin (tracks 1, 3, 4 & 6)
- Alfred Brown – viola (tracks 1, 3, 4 & 6)
- Kermit Moore – cello (tracks 1, 3, 4 & 6)

== Charts ==
Chart (1969)	Peak position
US Billboard Top LPs	183
