= Jazz and the Sounds of Nature =

Studio album by Yusef Lateef
- Released: 1958
- Recorded: October 9–10, 1957
- Studio: Van Gelder Studio, Hackensack, New Jersey
- Genre: Jazz
- Label: Savoy; MG 12120
- Producer: Ozzie Cadena

Yusef Lateef chronology
Before Dawn: The Music of Yusef Lateef (1957)	Jazz and the Sounds of Nature (1958)	Prayer to the East (1957)

Jazz and the Sound of Nature is an album by multi-instrumentalist Yusef Lateef recorded in 1957 and released on the Savoy label.

== Reception ==
Professional ratings
Review scores
Source	Rating
Allmusic	4.5/5 stars

The Allmusic site awarded the album 4½ stars.

== Track listing ==
All compositions by Yusef Lateef except as indicated

1. "Seulb" (Wilbur Harden) - 6:13
2. "Song of Delilah" (Ray Evans, Jay Livingston, Victor Young) - 8:21
3. "Sounds of Nature" - 3:47
4. "I Got It Bad (and That Ain't Good)" (Duke Ellington, Paul Francis Webster) - 6:19
5. "8540 Twelfth Street" - 4:25
6. "Check Blues" - 6:40
7. "Gypsy Arab" (Harden) - 3:26

== Personnel ==
- Yusef Lateef - tenor saxophone, flute - track 2, tambourine, Indian reed whistle
- Wilbur Harden - flugelhorn, tambourine
- Hugh Lawson - piano, ocarina
- Ernie Farrow - bass, rebab
- Oliver Jackson - drums, gong
