= Flute Suite =

Studio album by A. K. Salim
- Released: 1957
- Recorded: March 21, 1957
- Studio: Van Gelder Studio, Hackensack, NJ
- Genre: Jazz
- Length: 32:32
- Label: Savoy; MG 12102
- Producer: Ozzie Cadena

A. K. Salim chronology
Flute Suite (1957)	Stable Mates (1957)

Flute Suite is an album by American jazz composer and arranger A. K. Salim featuring flautists Frank Wess and Herbie Mann recorded in 1957 for the Savoy label.

== Reception ==
Professional ratings
Review scores
Source	Rating
Allmusic	3/5 stars

Allmusic awarded the album 3 stars

== Track listing ==
All compositions by A. K. Salim, except where noted.

1. "Duo-Flautist" - 2:45
2. "Miltown Blues" - 7:20
3. "Woolafunt's Lament" (Frank Wess) - 7:05 Bonus track on original LP release
4. "Ballin' the Blues" - 3:23
5. "Pretty Baby" - 4:57
6. "Loping" - 2:51
7. "Talk That Talk" - 4:11

== Personnel ==
- A. K. Salim - arranger, director
- Herbie Mann, Frank Wess - flute, tenor saxophone
- Joe Wilder - trumpet
- Frank Rehak - trombone
- Hank Jones - piano
- Wendell Marshall - bass
- Bobby Donaldson - drums

Track 3 was an advance selection added on to the original LP release to promote the forthcoming album Jazz for Playboys and featured the following personnel:

- Frank Wess - tenor saxophone
- Kenny Burrell, Freddie Green - guitar
- Eddie Jones - bass
- Gus Johnson - drums
- Recorded at Van Gelder Studio in Hackensack, New Jersey on January 5, 1957
