= Tetragon (album) =

Studio album by Joe Henderson
- Released: 1968
- Recorded: September 27, 1967 (#4, 6–7); May 16, 1968 (#1–3, 5)
- Studio: Plaza Sound Studios, New York City
- Genre: Jazz; post-bop
- Length: 40:58
- Label: Milestone; MSP 9017
- Producer: Orrin Keepnews

Joe Henderson chronology
The Kicker (1967)	Tetragon (1968)	Four (1968)

Tetragon is the seventh album by American jazz saxophonist Joe Henderson, and his second to be released on the Milestone label. It was recorded on September 27, 1967, and May 16, 1968, and features performances by Henderson with two different quartets—both with bassist Ron Carter, one with pianist Don Friedman and drummer Jack DeJohnette, the other with pianist Kenny Barron and drummer Louis Hayes. The AllMusic review by Scott Yanow states that "Highlights of this album include the title track, 'I've Got You Under My Skin' and 'Invitation'."

Professional ratings
Review scores
Source	Rating
AllMusic	4/5 stars
DownBeat	4/5 stars
Jazz.com	91/100
The Rolling Stone Jazz Record Guide	3/5 stars

== Track listing ==
1. "Invitation" (Bronisław Kaper, Paul Francis Webster) – 6:18
2. "R.J." (Ron Carter) – 5:38
3. "The Bead Game" (Joe Henderson) – 8:39
4. "Tetragon" (Joe Henderson) – 5:40
5. "Waltz for Zweetie" (Walter Bishop Jr.) – 4:29
6. "First Trip" (Ron Carter) – 5:15
7. "I've Got You Under My Skin" (Cole Porter) – 4:59

== Personnel ==
- Joe Henderson – tenor saxophone
- Ron Carter – double bass

On tracks 1–3 & 5

- Don Friedman – piano
- Jack DeJohnette – drums

On tracks 4, 6 & 7

- Kenny Barron – piano
- Louis Hayes – drums

== Charts ==
Chart performance for Tetragon
Chart (2026)	Peak position
US Top Jazz Albums (Billboard)	18
US Top Traditional Jazz Albums (Billboard)	14
