= Evans Bradshaw =

American jazz pianist (1933–1970)

Evans Bradshaw, Jr. (1933 – December 8, 1970) was an American jazz pianist. Born in Memphis, Tennessee, Bradshaw learned piano from an early age and was playing in his father's band by the age of 12. He moved to New York City in 1958 and recorded two albums for the Riverside label. Following these two albums, Bradshaw never recorded again.

In 1961, he moved to Oakland, California, and died there on December 8, 1970, at the age of 37.

== Discography ==
- Look Out for Evans Bradshaw! (Riverside, 1958)
- Pieces of Eighty-Eight (Riverside, 1959)
