= The Blue Yusef Lateef =

Studio album by Yusef Lateef
- Released: Late June/early July 1968
- Recorded: April 23–24, 1968
- Studio: RCA, New York City
- Genre: Jazz
- Length: 36:05
- Label: Atlantic; SD 1508
- Producer: Joel Dorn

Yusef Lateef chronology
| The Complete Yusef Lateef (1967) | The Blue Yusef Lateef (1968) | Yusef Lateef's Detroit (1969) |

The Blue Yusef Lateef is an album by multi-instrumentalist Yusef Lateef, recorded in 1968 and released on the Atlantic label.

== Reception ==
Professional ratings
Review scores
| Source | Rating |
|---|---|
| AllMusic | 4/5 stars |
| The Penguin Guide to Jazz Recordings | 3/4 stars |

AllMusic reviewer Thom Jurek stated: "The Blue Yusef Lateef is one wild album. In sound, it is the very best the '60s had to offer in terms of experimentation and accessibility. This is blues you can dance to, but also meditate to and marvel at; a pearl worthy of the price".

== Track listing ==
All compositions by Yusef Lateef except as indicated.

1. "Juba Juba" – 4:23
2. "Like It Is" – 7:35
3. "Othelia" – 4:37
4. "Moon Cup" – 3:18
5. "Back Home" – 5:03
6. "Get Over, Get Off and Get On" (Hugh Lawson) – 3:46
7. "Six Miles Next Door" – 4:46
8. "Sun Dog" – 3:05

== Personnel ==
- Yusef Lateef – tenor saxophone, flute, pneumatic flute, shannie (as listed in credits, presumably a shehnai), koto, tambura, scraper, vocals
- Blue Mitchell – trumpet
- Sonny Red – alto saxophone
- Buddy Lucas – harmonica
- Hugh Lawson – piano
- Kenny Burrell – guitar
- Cecil McBee – bass
- Bob Cranshaw – electric bass
- Roy Brooks – drums
- Selwart Clarke, James Tryon – violin (track 2)
- Alfred Brown – viola (track 2)
- Kermit Moore – cello (track 2)
- The Sweet Inspirations – vocal group (tracks 1 & 5)
