= Jazz 'Round the World =

Studio album by Yusef Lateef
- Released: 1964
- Recorded: December 19–20, 1963
- Studio: Van Gelder Studio, Englewood Cliffs, NJ
- Genre: Jazz
- Length: 31:04
- Label: Impulse!
- Producer: Bob Thiele

Yusef Lateef chronology
Into Something (1961)	Jazz 'Round the World (1964)	Live at Pep's (1964)

Jazz 'Round the World is an album by American jazz multi-instrumentalist Yusef Lateef featuring performances recorded in 1963 for the Impulse! label.

== Reception ==
The Allmusic review by Jason Ankeny stated: "Yusef Lateef's first Impulse! date Jazz 'Round the World anticipates the emerging vogue for global music with a series of impassioned interpretations of traditional ethnic folk songs... Lateef proves that while music may indeed reign as the universal language, some speakers are far more fluent and eloquent than others".

Professional ratings
Review scores
Source	Rating
Allmusic	4/5 stars

== Track listing ==
All compositions by Yusef Lateef except where noted.

1. "Abana" - 2:20
2. "India" - 4:09
3. "You, So Tender and Wistful" - 2:29
4. "Yusef's French Brother" - 4:10
5. "The Volga Rhythm Song" - 2:03
6. "Trouble In Mind" (Richard M. Jones) - 3:12
7. "The Good Old Roast Beef of England" - 2:31
8. "Raisins And Almonds" - 3:05
9. "Utopia" - 2:47
10. "Ringo Oiwake" (Fujio Ozawa, Masao Yoneyama) - 4:18

- Recorded at Rudy Van Gelder Studio in Englewood Cliffs, New Jersey on December 19 & 20, 1963

== Personnel ==
- Yusef Lateef – tenor saxophone, flute, bassoon, oboe, shenai
- Richard Williams – trumpet
- Hugh Lawson – piano
- Ernie Farrow – bass
- Lex Humphries – drums
