= Before Dawn: The Music of Yusef Lateef =

Studio album by Yusef Lateef
- Released: February 1958
- Recorded: April 16, 1957
- Studio: WOR Recording Studios, New York City
- Genre: Jazz
- Label: Verve; MGV-8217
- Producer: Norman Granz

Yusef Lateef chronology
Jazz Mood (1957)	Before Dawn: The Music of Yusef Lateef (1958)	Jazz and the Sounds of Nature (1957)

Before Dawn: The Music of Yusef Lateef is an album by multi-instrumentalist Yusef Lateef recorded in 1957 and released on the Verve label. The album was produced from Lateef's third recording session under his leadership.

== Reception ==
Professional ratings
Review scores
Source	Rating
Allmusic	4/5 stars

Allmusic review by Scott Yanow stated: "This is one of the most obscure of all Yusef Lateef recordings... the set is more bop-oriented than normal... showing how strong and original Lateef could be even playing conventional straight-ahead material. Some of the other pieces look toward the future and/or the East, and all eight selections have their memorable moments... Recommended."

== Track listing ==
All compositions by Yusef Lateef except as indicated

1. "Passion" - 4:04
2. "Love Is Eternal" - 6:30
3. "Pike's Peak" - 5:30
4. "Open Strings" - 6:15
5. "Before Dawn" - 5:27
6. "Twenty-Five Minute Blues" - 5:27
7. "Chang, Chang, Chang" - 2:57
8. "Constellation" (Charlie Parker) - 4:47

== Personnel ==
- Yusef Lateef - tenor saxophone, flute (track 4), arghul, percussion
- Curtis Fuller - trombone
- Hugh Lawson - piano, celesta (track 4)
- Ernie Farrow - bass, rebab
- Louis Hayes - drums
