= In Nigeria =

Studio album by Yusef Lateef
- Released: 1985
- Recorded: July 1983
- Studio: EMI Studios, Lagos, Nigeria.
- Genre: Jazz
- Length: 37:32
- Label: Landmark Records
- Producer: Yusef Lateef

Yusef Lateef chronology
Hikima: Creativity (1983)	In Nigeria (1985)	Yusef Lateef's Little Symphony (1987)

Yusef Lateef in Nigeria is an album by American multi-instrumentalist and composer Yusef Lateef recorded in 1983 and released on the Landmark label.

== Reception ==
The Allmusic review stated "Yusef Lateef had been a musical giant for three decades when this album came out, his first recording in several years. Unfortunately the emphasis here is on setting introspective moods and there is little development in the improvisations. Lateef (on tenor, flutes and vocals) is joined by five African percussionists and a variety of vocalists (including himself) and, despite good intentions, this session is quite forgettable."

== Track listing ==
All compositions by Yusef Lateer

1. "Mu, Omi (Drink Water)" – 6:31
2. "Drama Village" – 6:05
3. "Akima (Birth)" – 6:45
4. "Blues in the Adaji" – 5:47
5. "Lalit (Lovers' Separation)" – 4:19
6. "Curved Spacetime" – 5:29
7. "Ruwa Maizurufi (Deep Water)" – 4:20

== Personnel ==
- Yusef Lateef – Algaita, Flute, Oboe, Tenor, Vocals
- Awwalu Adamu, Salisu I. Mashi, P. Adegboyega Badejo, Yusufu Aminu, Shittu Isyaku – Percussion
- Amina Abdullahi, Esther Kawai, Tani Umaru, Veronica Ugye – Vocals
