= Autophysiopsychic =

Studio album by Yusef Lateef with Art Farmer
- Released: 1977
- Recorded: October 19–21, 1977
- Studios: Electric Lady, New York City
- Genre: Jazz
- Length: 39:16
- Labels: CTI; CTI 7082
- Producer: Creed Taylor

Yusef Lateef chronology
The Doctor is In... and Out (1976)	Autophysiopsychic (1977)	In a Temple Garden (1977)

Autophysiopsychic is an album by American multi-instrumentalist and composer Yusef Lateef, recorded in 1977 and released on the CTI label. The record was recorded in October 1977 at Electric Lady Studios in New York, United States. The title comes from Lateef's preferred term for his form of music.

== Reception ==
The AllMusic review stated: "Autophysiopsychic is probably the single album that many Yusef Lateef fans either love or hate the most... five fat slices of original funk that have far more in common with the sounds of Chocolate City than with the bop sounds of 52nd Street. Autophysiopsychic is awash in the soft soul-funk-jazz sound typical of Creed Taylor's (CTI) productions in the 1970s... Not the most typical album in Lateef's wide-ranging catalog, but certainly the most fun".

Professional ratings
Review scores
Source	Rating
AllMusic	4/5 stars
The Penguin Guide to Jazz Recordings	1.5/4 stars

== Track listing ==
All compositions by Yusef Lateef except as indicated

1. "Robot Man" – 6:39
2. "Look on the Right Side" – 5:10
3. "Yl" (David Matthews) – 7:58
4. "Communication" – 9:23
5. "Sister Mamie" – 10:06
  - Recorded at Electric Lady Studios in New York City on October 19, 20 & 21, 1977

== Personnel ==
- Yusef Lateef – flute, tenor saxophone, soprano saxophone, shehnai, vocals
- Art Farmer – flugelhorn
- Clifford Carter – keyboards
- Eric Gale – electric guitar
- Gary King – electric bass
- Jim Madison – drums
- Sue Evans – percussion
- Frank Floyd, Babi Floyd, Milt Grayson, Norberto Jones – backing vocals
- David Matthews – arranger
