= Cry! – Tender =

Studio album by Yusef Lateef
- Released: August 1960
- Recorded: October 16, 1959, October 11, 1957 (8)
- Studio: Van Gelder, Englewood Cliffs & Hackensack, New Jersey (8)
- Genre: Jazz
- Length: 37:11
- Label: New Jazz; NJLP 8234
- Producer: Esmond Edwards

Yusef Lateef chronology
The Fabric of Jazz (1959)	Cry! – Tender (1960)	The Three Faces of Yusef Lateef (1960)

Cry! – Tender is an album by American multi-instrumentalist Yusef Lateef, recorded in 1959 (with one track recorded in 1957) and released on the New Jazz label.

== Reception ==
Professional ratings
Review scores
Source	Rating
AllMusic	4.5/5 stars
The Penguin Guide to Jazz Recordings	3/4 stars

AllMusic stated: "Lateef was already moving away from what most people would call jazz by this time, yet, as evidenced here, his music remained challenging and very accessible. This is meditative music with a stunningly rich rhythmic palette for how muted and edgeless it is. And, like John Cage or Morton Feldman, the absence of those edges was written in; it's not random".

== Track listing ==
All compositions by Yusef Lateef, except where noted.

1. "Sea Breeze" (Al Hoffman, Dick Manning) – 3:11
2. "Dopolous" – 3:18
3. "Cry! – Tender" – 6:00
4. "Butter's Blues" – 5:45
5. "Yesterdays" (Otto Harbach, Jerome Kern) – 4:24
6. "The Snow Is Green" – 3:13
7. "If You Could See Me Now" (Tadd Dameron, Carl Sigman) – 4:49
8. "Ecaps" – 6:30
- Recorded at Van Gelder Studio in Englewood Cliffs, New Jersey, on October 16, 1959, except for track 8 recorded at Van Gelder Studio in Hackensack, New Jersey, on October 11, 1957

== Personnel ==
- Yusef Lateef – tenor saxophone, flute (track 2), oboe (tracks 1,3 and 5)
- Lonnie Hillyer – trumpet (tracks 2–7)
- Wilbur Harden – flugelhorn (track 8)
- Hugh Lawson – piano (tracks 1–7)
- Ernie Farrow (track 8), Herman Wright (tracks 1–7) – bass
- Frank Gant (tracks 1–7), Oliver Jackson (track 8) – drums, percussion
