= Pieces of Eighty-Eight =

Studio album by Evans Bradshaw
- Released: 1959
- Recorded: January 27, 1959; Reeves Sound Studio, New York City
- Genre: Jazz
- Length: 42:41
- Label: Riverside; RLP 12-296
- Producer: Orrin Keepnews

Evans Bradshaw chronology
Look Out for Evans Bradshaw! (1958)	Pieces of Eighty-Eight (1959)

Pieces of Eighty-Eight is the second and final album by American jazz pianist Evans Bradshaw featuring tracks recorded in 1959 for the Riverside label.

== Reception ==
Professional ratings
Review scores
Source	Rating
Allmusic	3/5 stars

Allmusic awarded the album 3 stars.

== Track listing ==
1. "The Trolley Song" (Ralph Blane, Hugh Martin) – 5:34
2. "Mangos" (Dale Libby, Sid Wayne) – 4:53
3. "Pushing the Blues" (Evans Bradshaw) – 2:53
4. "It Ain't Necessarily So"(George Gershwin, Ira Gershwin) – 5:01
5. "Take the "A" Train" (Billy Strayhorn) – 3:30
6. "A Foggy Day" (Gershwin, Gershwin) – 6:22
7. "It's All Right With Me" (Cole Porter) – 5:14
8. "Blues for Jim" (Bradshaw) – 6:41
9. "A Night in Tunisia" (Dizzy Gillespie, Frank Paparelli) – 2:33

== Personnel ==
- Evans Bradshaw - piano
- Alvin Jackson - bass
- Richard Allen - drums
