= The Golden Flute =

Studio album by Yusef Lateef
- Released: January 1967
- Recorded: June 15–16, 1966
- Studios: Van Gelder, Englewood Cliffs, New Jersey
- Genre: Jazz
- Length: 39:40
- Labels: Impulse! A-9125
- Producer: Bob Thiele

Yusef Lateef chronology
A Flat, G Flat and C (1966)	The Golden Flute (1967)	The Complete Yusef Lateef (1967)

The Golden Flute is an album by American jazz multi-instrumentalist Yusef Lateef, recorded in 1966 for the Impulse! label.

== Reception ==
The AllMusic review by Scott Yanow stated: "Lateef has long been a true original, and he revitalizes the standards while always swinging and being a bit unpredictable. Well worth searching for".

Professional ratings
Review scores
Source	Rating
AllMusic	4.5/5 stars
The Penguin Guide to Jazz Recordings	3/4 stars

== Track listing ==
All compositions by Yusef Lateef except as noted.

1. "Road Runner" - 4:47
2. "Straighten Up and Fly Right" (Nat King Cole, Irving Mills) - 3:28
3. "Oasis" - 4:26
4. "I Don't Stand a Ghost of a Chance with You" (Bing Crosby, Ned Washington, Victor Young) - 4:06
5. "Exactly Like You" (Dorothy Fields, Jimmy McHugh) - 2:57
6. "The Golden Flute" - 3:56
7. "Rosetta" (Earl Hines, Henri Woode) - 3:54
8. "Head Hunters" (Barry Harris, Hugh Lawson) - 4:35
9. "The Smart Set" (Roy Brooks) - 7:31
- Recorded on June 15, 1966 (tracks 1, 3, 4, 7 & 8), and June 16, 1966 (tracks 2, 5, 6 & 9)

== Personnel ==
- Yusef Lateef – tenor saxophone, flute, oboe
- Hugh Lawson – piano
- Herman Wright – bass
- Roy Brooks Jr. – drums
