= Part of the Search =

Studio album by Yusef Lateef
- Released: 1974
- Recorded: September 1, 1971, April 4 & 5, 1973, May 16, 1973 and December 26, 1973; New York City
- Genre: Jazz
- Length: 38:07
- Label: Atlantic; SD 1650
- Producer: Joel Dorn

Yusef Lateef chronology
Hush 'N' Thunder (1972)	Part of the Search (1974)	10 Years Hence (1974)

Part of the Search is an album by multi-instrumentalist Yusef Lateef recorded in 1973 (with one track from a 1971 recording session) and released on the Atlantic label.

== Reception ==
Professional ratings
Review scores
Source	Rating
Allmusic	4/5 stars

Allmusic awarded the album 4 stars with the review by Scott Yanow calling it, "one of his better efforts from the era".

== Track listing ==
All compositions by Yusef Lateef except as indicated

1. "K.C. Shuffle" (Kenny Barron) - 3:42
2. "Oatsy Doatsy [Part 1]" - 0:32
3. "Soul's Bakery" - 2:21
4. "Lunceford Prance" - 3:03
5. "Rockhouse" (Ray Charles) - 3:41
6. "Oatsy Doatsy [Part 2]" - 0:14
7. "In the Still of the Night" (Fred Parris) - 3:21
8. "Superfine" (Bob Cunningham) - 3:23
9. "Strange Lullaby" - 4:13
10. "Big Bass Drum" - 2:58
11. "Gettin' Sentimental" (Gus Kahn, Matty Malneck) - 9:51
- Recorded in New York City on September 1, 1971 (track 11), April 4, 1973 (tracks 1, 3 & 4), April 5, 1973 (tracks 2, 8 & 9), May 16, 1973 (tracks 5 & 7), September 13, 1973 (track 8) and December 26, 1973 (track 12)

== Personnel ==
- Yusef Lateef - alto saxophone, tenor saxophone, flute, bamboo flute, pneumatic bamboo flute, oboe, bells, tambourine
- Joe Newman, Jimmy Owens, Charles Sullivan - trumpet
- Wayne Andre, Garnett Brown, Warren Covington - trombone
- Jerry Dodgion, Charles McBurney, Rocky Morales Frank Wess - saxophones
- Willie Bridges - saxophone, flute
- Charlie Fowlkes - baritone saxophone
- Al Gafa - guitar
- Arnold Eidus, Emanuel Green - violin
- Selwart Clarke - cello
- Albert Heath - drums
- Kenny Barron, Ray Bryant - piano, electric piano
- Bob Cunningham, Sam Jones - bass
- Bill Salter - electric bass
- Ladji Camara - African percussion
