= Straight, No Chaser (Joe Henderson album) =

Live album by Joe Henderson
- Released: 1996
- Recorded: April 21, 1968
- Studio: Left Bank Jazz Society, Baltimore, MD
- Genre: Jazz
- Length: 70:49
- Label: Verve

Joe Henderson chronology
Four (1968)	Straight, No Chaser (1996)	Power to the People (1968)

Professional ratings
Review scores
Source	Rating
Allmusic	4/5 stars

Straight, No Chaser is an album by jazz saxophonist Joe Henderson released on the Verve label. It was recorded on April 21, 1968 and featuring a live performance by Henderson with pianist Wynton Kelly, bassist Paul Chambers and drummer Jimmy Cobb. The recording was not released until 1996. The Allmusic review by Scott Yanow states: "Although Henderson had not played with the other musicians before, they blend together quite well and obviously inspired each other". Further selections from this concert were released as Four.

== Track listing ==
1. "Straight, No Chaser" (Monk) – 14:40
2. "Days of Wine and Roses" (Mancini, Mercer) – 8:19
3. "What Is This Thing Called Love?" (Porter) – 9:28
4. "If You Could See Me Now" (Dameron, Sigman) – 8:39
5. "On a Clear Day (You Can See Forever)" (Lerner, Lane) – 11:51
6. "Limehouse Blues" (Braham, Furber) – 6:37
7. "Pfrancing" (Davis) – 9:02
8. "The Theme" (Davis) – 2:13

== Personnel ==
- Joe Henderson – tenor saxophone
- Wynton Kelly – piano
- Paul Chambers – bass
- Jimmy Cobb – drums
