= Live at Pep's =

Live album by Yusef Lateef
- Released: 1965, LP, 1993 CD
- Recorded: June 29, 1964
- Venue: Pep's Musical Bar, Philadelphia
- Genre: Jazz, Hard bop
- Length: 60:38 (first CD volume)
- Label: Impulse!, A(S) 69 (original LP release)
- Producer: Bob Thiele

Yusef Lateef chronology
Jazz 'Round the World (1963)	Live at Pep's (1965)	1984 (1965)

Live at Pep's is a 1964 album by the American Jazz tenor saxophonist and flautist Yusef Lateef. Other participating musicians in this album were bassist Ernie Farrow, pianist Mike Nock, drummer James Black and trumpeter Richard Williams. This live album was recorded at Pep's Lounge in Philadelphia, Pennsylvania.

More of Lateef's performances at Pep's from the end of June 1964 were issued on Club Date (ABC-Impulse! ASD 9310) in 1976 and later as an expanded 2-LP set titled The Live Session (IA-9353/2). The recordings were repackaged again for CD as two volumes in 1993 and 1999 as Live at Pep's.

== Reception ==
Professional ratings
Review scores
Source	Rating
AllMusic	5/5 stars
The Penguin Guide to Jazz Recordings	3.5/4 stars

Ron Wynn stated in a review for AllMusic: "This mid-'60s concert was one of Lateef's finest, as it perfectly displayed his multiple influences and interests." He continued: "Lateef played meaty tenor sax solos and entrancing flute and bamboo flute offerings, and also had impressive stints on oboe, shenai, and argol. This was a pivotal date in his career, and those unaware of it will get a treat with this disc."

== Track listing ==
All songs by Yusef Lateef unless otherwise noted.

No.	Title	Length
1.	"Sister Mamie"	5:26
2.	"Number 7"	9:39
3.	"Twelve Tone Blues (Leonard Feather)"	4:50
4.	"Oscarlypso (Oscar Pettiford)"	7:44
5.	"Gee Sam Gee"	6:37
6.	"Rogi (Richard Williams)"	6:43
7.	"See See Rider (Ma Rainey)"	5:21
8.	"The Magnolia Triangle (James Black)"	5:14
9.	"The Weaver"	5:39
10.	"Slippin' and Slidin'"	3:25

- This is the sequence for Volume 1. Tracks 4–6 were originally issued as part of Club Date (ASD 9310) and were not on the original album. However, The Jazz Discography by Tom Lord suggests these titles on the 1993 CD (GRD134) were recorded on June 29, 1964, whereas the Club Date LP includes the versions recorded on June 30, 1964.

Vol. 2:

No.	Title	Length
1.	"Brother John"	9:10
2.	"P-Bouk"	4:30
3.	"Nu-Bouk"	7:40
4.	"Yusef's Mood"	6:40
5.	"I Remember Clifford (Benny Golson)"	6:12
6.	"Listen to the Wind"	4:44
7.	"I Loved"	4:28
8.	"Delilah (Victor Young)"	10:15
9.	"The Magnolia Triangle - Alternative Version (James Black)"	5:17

- This is the sequence for the Volume 2. Tracks 1–3 were originally issued as part of Club Date (ASD 9310) recorded June 30, 1964. Tracks 4–9 were originally issued as part of The Live Session (IA-9353/2) recorded June 26, 1964. According to The Jazz Discography by Tom Lord, the 1999 CD issue lists these tracks as dating from June 29, 1964, in error.

== Personnel ==
- Yusef Lateef - tenor saxophone, flute, oboe, bamboo flute, shehnai, argol
- Richard Williams - trumpet
- Mike Nock - piano
- Ernie Farrow - bass
- James N. Black - drums
