= Afro-Soul/Drum Orgy =

Studio album by A. K. Salim
- Released: 1965
- Recorded: October 8, 1964
- Studio: Van Gelder Studio in Englewood cliffs, New Jersey
- Genre: Jazz
- Length: 34:20
- Label: Prestige; PR 7379

A. K. Salim chronology
Blues Suite (1958)	Afro-Soul/Drum Orgy (1965)

Afro-Soul/Drum Orgy is an album by American jazz composer and arranger A. K. Salim featuring Johnny Coles, Pat Patrick and Yusef Lateef recorded in 1964 for the Prestige label.

== Reception ==
Professional ratings
Review scores
Source	Rating
Allmusic	3/5 stars

Allmusic awarded the album 3 stars

== Track listing ==
All compositions by A. K. Salim.

1. "Afrika (Africa)" – 9:40
2. "Ngomba Ya Tempo (Elephant Dance)" – 9:40
3. "Kumuamkia Mzulu (Salute to a Zulu)" – 7:00
4. "Pepo Za Sarari (Trade Winds)" – 8:00

== Personnel ==
- A. K. Salim – arranger, director
- Johnny Coles – trumpet
- Pat Patrick – alto saxophone, baritone saxophone, flute
- Yusef Lateef – tenor saxophone, flute, argol
- Philemon Hon – African xylophone, tambor drums
- Juan Cadaviejo – congas
- Osvaldo "Chihuahua" Martinez – bongos, congas, cowbells
- William Correa – timbales
