= Blues Suite =

Studio album by A. K. Salim
- Released: 1958
- Recorded: October 6, 1958
- Studio: Van Gelder Studio, Hackensack, New Jersey
- Genre: Jazz
- Length: 31:57
- Label: Savoy; MG 12132
- Producer: Ozzie Cadena

A. K. Salim chronology
Pretty for the People (1958)	Blues Suite (1958)	Afro-Soul/Drum Orgy (1964)

Blues Suite is an album by American jazz composer and arranger A. K. Salim featuring Nat Adderley and Phil Woods recorded in 1958 for the Savoy label.

== Reception ==
Professional ratings
Review scores
Source	Rating
Allmusic	1.5/5 stars

Allmusic reviewer Jim Todd states "This set of mid-tempo, blues-based arrangements performed by an all-star group is a good idea that falls short in its execution. ...Dreary is too strong a word, but certainly dull".

== Track listing ==
All compositions by A. K. Salim

1. "Pay Day" - 3:56
2. "Joy Box" - 6:03
3. "Full Moon" - 5:12
4. "Blue Baby" - 3:39
5. "The Sultan" - 4:25
6. "Blue Shout" - 3:25
7. "Like How Long Baby" - 4:59

== Personnel ==
- A. K. Salim - arranger, director
- Nat Adderley - cornet
- Paul Cohen, Joe Wilder - trumpet
- Buster Cooper - trombone
- Phil Woods - alto saxophone
- Seldon Powell - tenor saxophone, flute
- Sahib Shihab - baritone saxophone
- Oscar Dennard - piano
- Eddie Costa - piano, vibraphone
- George Duvivier - bass
- Granville Hogan - drums
