= 1984 (Yusef Lateef album) =

Studio album by Yusef Lateef
- Released: November 1965
- Recorded: February 24, 1965
- Studio: Van Gelder Studio, Englewood Cliffs, NJ
- Genre: Jazz
- Length: 39:51
- Label: Impulse!
- Producer: Bob Thiele

Yusef Lateef chronology
Live at Pep's (1965)	1984 (1965)	Psychicemotus (1965)

Professional ratings
Review scores
Source	Rating
Allmusic	4/5 stars

1984 is a 1965 album by Yusef Lateef.

== Track listing ==
All tracks are written by Yusef Lateef, except where noted.

No.	Title	Length
1.	"1984"	8:16
2.	"Try Love"	2:13
3.	"Soul Sister" (Ted Harris, Jr.)	3:05
4.	"Love Waltz" (Mike Nock)	4:30
5.	"One Little Indian"	2:37
6.	"Listen to the Wind"	6:12
7.	"Warm Fire" (Duke Ellington)	4:21
8.	"Gee Sam Gee"	5:21
9.	"The Greatest Story Ever Told" (Alfred Newman)	3:16

== Personnel ==
Musicians

- Yusef Lateef – flute, oboe, tenor saxophone
- Mike Nock – piano
- Reggie Workman – double bass
- James Black – drums, percussion, indian bells
