= Yusef Lateef's Little Symphony =

Studio album by Yusef Lateef
- Released: 1987
- Recorded: June 1987
- Genre: Jazz; new-age
- Length: 32:53
- Label: Rhino Atlantic
- Producer: Yusef Lateef

Yusef Lateef chronology
In Nigeria (1985)	Yusef Lateef's Little Symphony (1987)	Concerto for Yusef Lateef (1988)

Yusef Lateef's Little Symphony is an album by Yusef Lateef, released through the record label Rhino Atlantic in 1987. The album, which Billboard described as "an atmospheric four-movement classical/jazz composition", was produced by Lateef, recorded, mixed and mastered by Norman Blain, and remastered by Dennis King. Lateef provided all instrumentation that appears on the album. In 1988, Yusef Lateef's Little Symphony earned Lateef the Grammy Award for Best New Age Album despite having no prior association with the genre.

== Composition and reception ==
Professional ratings
Review scores
Source	Rating
AllMusic	1.5/5 stars
The Penguin Guide to Jazz Recordings	2.5/4 stars

Lateef played all of the instruments that appear on Yusef Lateef's Little Symphony, which Billboard described as "an atmospheric four-movement classical/jazz composition". The album was produced by Lateef, recorded, mixed and mastered by Norman Blain, and remastered by Dennis King.

In 1988, the album earned Lateef the Grammy Award for Best New Age Album despite having no prior association with new-age music. Known for disliking the term "jazz", Lateef has stated he has no problem with the New Age classification and believes the genre has no "negative connotations at all".

== Track listing ==
All songs by Yusef Lateef.

1. "First Movement: Larghissimo" – 8:05
2. "Second Movement: Andante" – 8:14
3. "Third Movement: Moderato" – 10:07
4. "Fourth Movement: Presto" – 6:51

Track listing adapted from AllMusic.

== Personnel ==
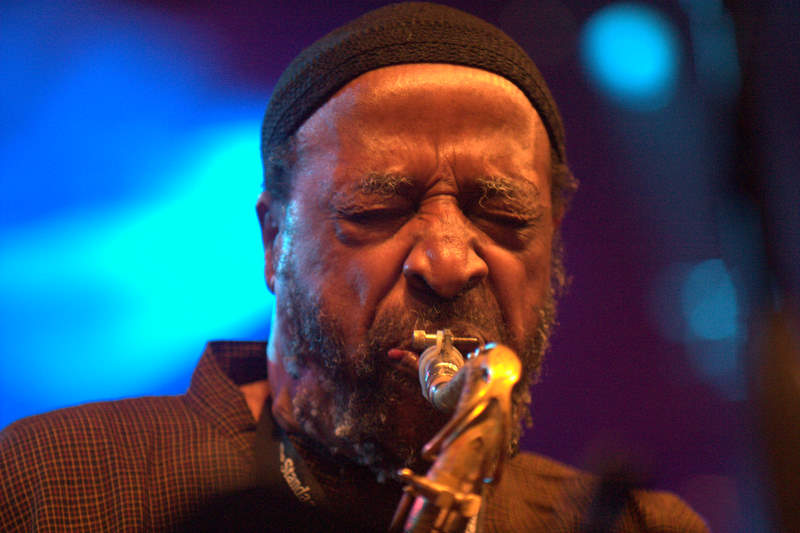
Yusef Lateef in 2007

- Yusef Lateef – alto flute, casio, drums, Ensoniq Mirage, flute, gourd, kalangu, producer, soprano flute, soprano saxophone, tenor flute, tenor saxophone, shehnai flute, sitar, water drums
- Norman Blain – engineer, mastering, mixing
- Dennis King – remastering
- Bob Defrin – art direction
- Cheryl Griesbach – illustrations
- Stanley Martucci – illustrations

Credits adapted from AllMusic.

== See also ==
- List of new-age music artists
- List of New Age topics
