= A. K. Salim =

American jazz composer and arranger (1922–2003)

Ahmad Khatab Salim
- Also known as: Ahmad Kharab Salim
- Born: Albert Atkinson; July 28, 1922; Chattanooga, Tennessee, United States
- Died: January 1, 2003 (aged 80)
- Genres: Jazz
- Occupations: Arranger, composer, musician
- Instrument: Alto saxophone
- Years active: 1939–65

Ahmad Khatab Salim or Ahmad Kharab Salim (born Albert Atkinson) (July 28, 1922 – January 1, 2003) was an American jazz composer, and arranger.

== Biography ==
Salim attended DuSable High School with Bennie Green, Dorothy Donegan and Gene Ammons and played alto saxophone in King Kolax's band from 1938 to 1939 before working with Jimmy Raschel and Tiny Bradshaw. He stopped playing after a jaw injury in 1943 and arranged music for the big bands of Lucky Millinder, Cab Calloway, Jimmy Lunceford, Lionel Hampton and Count Basie who recorded his composition "Normania" in 1949, and recorded it again in 1952 as "Blee Blop Blues". Salim left music for a career in real estate from 1949 to 1956 but returned to write and arrange Latin jazz for Tito Puente, Machito, Dizzy Gillespie and others. Salim released three albums under his leadership on Savoy Records in the late 1950s and recorded a further album for Prestige Records in 1964.

Salim died on January 1, 2003, aged 80.

== Discography ==
=== As leader ===
- Flute Suite (Savoy, 1957) with Frank Wess and Herbie Mann
- Stable Mates (Savoy, 1957) split album with Yusef Lateef
- Pretty for the People (Savoy, 1957)
- Blues Suite (Savoy, 1958)
- Afro-Soul/Drum Orgy (Prestige, 1965)

=== As arranger/composer ===
With Count Basie

- Basie Jazz (Clef, 1952 [1954])
- Basie in London (Verve, 1956)
- Count Basie at Newport (Verve, 1957)
- Basie at Birdland (Roulette, 1961)

With Dizzy Gillespie

- World Statesman (Norgran, 1956)
- Dizzy Gillespie at Newport (Verve, 1957)

With Herbie Mann

- Salute to the Flute (Epic, 1957)
- Flute, Brass, Vibes and Percussion (Verve, 1960)

With Tito Puente

- Puente Goes Jazz (RCA, 1956)
- Herman's Heat & Puente's Beat! (Everest, 1958) with Woody Herman

With others

- Gene Ammons, Jug Sessions (EmArcy, 1947 [1976])
- Illinois Jacquet, Groovin' with Jacquet (Clef, 1951-53 [1956])
- Machito, Kenya (Roulette, 1957)
- Phineas Newborn, Jr., Phineas Newborn, Jr. Plays Harold Arlen's Music from Jamaica (RCA Victor, 1957)

== See also ==
- List of jazz arrangers
