= Into Something =

Studio album by Yusef Lateef
- Released: 1962
- Recorded: December 29, 1961
- Studio: Van Gelder, Englewood Cliffs, New Jersey, U.S.
- Genre: Jazz
- Length: 40:53
- Label: New Jazz; NJLP 8272
- Producer: Esmond Edwards

Yusef Lateef chronology
| Eastern Sounds (1962) | Into Something (1962) | Jazz 'Round the World (1963) |

Into Something is an album by multi-instrumentalist Yusef Lateef, recorded in 1961 and released on the New Jazz label.

== Reception ==
Professional ratings
Review scores
| Source | Rating |
|---|---|
| AllMusic | 4.5/5 stars |
| DownBeat | 4/5 stars |
| The Penguin Guide to Jazz Recordings | 3/4 stars |

The AllMusic reviewer Scott Yanow described it as a "superior set.. a well rounded program" and "a particularly memorable performance".

== Track listing ==
All compositions by Yusef Lateef except where noted.

1. "Rasheed" – 5:26
2. "When You're Smiling (The Whole World Smiles with You)" (Mark Fisher, Joe Goodwin, Larry Shay) – 4:43
3. "Water Pistol" – 5:40
4. "You've Changed" (Bill Carey, Carl Fischer) – 4:53
5. "I'll Remember April" (Gene de Paul, Patricia Johnston, Don Raye) – 6:51
6. "Koko's Tune" – 6:29
7. "P. Bouk" – 7:11

== Personnel ==
- Yusef Lateef – tenor saxophone, oboe (track 1), flute (track 5)
- Herman Wright – bass
- Elvin Jones – drums
- Barry Harris – piano (tracks 1, 4–5, 7)
