= Eastern Sounds =

Album by Yusef Lateef

Studio album by Yusef Lateef
- Released: April 1962
- Recorded: September 5, 1961
- Studio: Van Gelder, Englewood Cliffs, New Jersey
- Genre: Hard bop
- Length: 39:54
- Label: Moodsville; MVLP 22
- Producer: Esmond Edwards

Yusef Lateef chronology
Lost in Sound (1961)	Eastern Sounds (1962)	Into Something (1962)

Professional ratings
Review scores
Source	Rating
AllMusic	5/5 stars
The Penguin Guide to Jazz Recordings	3.5/4 stars

Eastern Sounds is a studio album by the jazz multi-instrumentalist and composer Yusef Lateef. It was released in April 1962 through Prestige Records on their Moodsville imprint. The recording was made in September 1961. The album features Lateef's continued exploration of Middle Eastern music, which were incorporated into his version of hard bop with a quartet featuring Barry Harris on piano. The opening track features Lateef on Chinese globular flute, generally called xun. The fusing of musical genres was not a new thing in jazz or for Lateef as his 1957 album Prayer to the East incorporated the shehnai and Middle Eastern influences in playing jazz standards. In addition to original compositions by Lateef, Eastern Sounds includes covers of themes from the films Spartacus and The Robe, both of which have been sampled by producer Nujabes.

== Track listing ==
1. "The Plum Blossom" (Yusef Lateef) – 5:03
2. "Blues for the Orient" (Lateef) – 5:40
3. "Ching Miau" (Lateef) – 3:20
4. "Don't Blame Me" (Jimmy McHugh) – 4:57
5. "Love Theme from Spartacus" (Alex North) – 4:15
6. "Snafu" (Lateef) – 5:42
7. "Purple Flower" (Lateef) – 4:32
8. "Love Theme from The Robe" (Alfred Newman) – 4:02
9. "The Three Faces of Balal" (Lateef) – 2:23

== Trivia ==
Singer-songwriter Cat Stevens was inspired by the melody of the opening track to write his first hit single "I Love My Dog" (1966). Lateef later received credits and royalties for it.

== Personnel ==
- Yusef Lateef – flute, oboe, tenor saxophone, xun (called "Chinese globular flute" in liner notes)
- Barry Harris – piano
- Ernie Farrow – double bass, Rabaab (called "rabat" in liner notes)
- Lex Humphries – drums
