= Hush 'N' Thunder =

Studio album by Yusef Lateef
- Released: January 1973
- Recorded: May 8, 10–11 & 18 and September 25–26, 1972
- Studio: Regent Sound, New York City & Atlantic
- Genre: Jazz
- Length: 38:24
- Label: Atlantic; SD 1635
- Producer: Joel Dorn

Yusef Lateef chronology
The Gentle Giant (1970–71)	Hush 'N' Thunder (1973)	Part of the Search (1973)

Hush 'N' Thunder is an album by multi-instrumentalist Yusef Lateef, recorded in 1972 and released on the Atlantic label.

== Reception ==
Professional ratings
Review scores
Source	Rating
AllMusic	4/5 stars
The Penguin Guide to Jazz Recordings	2/4 stars

AllMusic awarded the album 4 stars with the review by Thom Jurek stating, "This album showcases Dr. Lateef heading for new musical frontiers as an interpreter and arranger and a deeply lyrical series of meditations on rhythm and melody".

== Track listing ==
1. "Come Sunday" (Duke Ellington) – 2:34
2. "The Hump" (Kenny Barron) – 4:45
3. "Opus Part I / Opus Part II" (Barron) – 8:02
4. "This Old Building" (Rev. Cleophus Robinson) – 2:42
5. "Prayer" (Barron) – 3:05
6. "Sunset" (Barron) – 7:53
7. "His Eye Is on the Sparrow" (Traditional) – 5:34
8. "Destination Paradise" (Lateef) – 3:49
- Recorded in New York City on May 8, 1972 (track 7), May 10, 1972 (track 4), May 11, 1972 (track 1), May 18, 1972 (track 8), September 25, 1972 (track 5), and September 26, 1972 (tracks 2, 3 & 6)

== Personnel ==
- Yusef Lateef – tenor saxophone, flute, shannai
- Kenny Barron – piano, electric piano
- Ray Bryant – piano (track 3)
- Cornell Dupree, Keith Loving, David Spinozza – guitar (track 8)
- Bob Cunningham (tracks 2, 3 & 6), Bill Salter (track 5) – bass
- Gordon Edwards – electric bass (tracks 8)
- Albert Heath – drums (tracks 2, 3 & 6)
- Al White – organ (tracks 4 & 7)
- The J.C. White Singers – vocals (tracks 4 & 7)
- Monroe "Bones" Constantino – vocals (tracks 3 & 5)
- Kermit Moore – cello (track 3)
