= The Complete Yusef Lateef =

Studio album by Yusef Lateef
- Released: February 1968
- Recorded: June 1, 1967
- Studio: New York City
- Genre: Jazz
- Length: 38:26
- Labels: Atlantic; SD 1499
- Producer: Joel Dorn

Yusef Lateef chronology
The Golden Flute (1966)	The Complete Yusef Lateef (1968)	The Blue Yusef Lateef (1968)

The Complete Yusef Lateef is an album by multi-instrumentalist Yusef Lateef recorded in 1967 and released on the Atlantic label.

== Reception ==
Professional ratings
Review scores
Source	Rating
Allmusic	4/5 stars

The Allmusic reviewer Thom Jurek stated: "The title of this album is misleading in that it may suggest to the casual viewer a retrospective. It is anything but. Lateef is referring here to the complete in the sense that it contains the completeness of his musical vision at a given time... an album that is as fine as any of his Prestige or Impulse! recordings".

== Track listing ==
All compositions by Yusef Lateef, except as indicated:

1. "Rosalie" (Traditional) – 5:28
2. "In the Evening" (Leroy Carr, Don Raye) – 6:41
3. "Kongsberg" – 6:12
4. "Stay With Me [Theme from the Cardinal]" (Carolyn Leigh, Jerome Moross) – 5:21
5. "Sea Line Woman" (Traditional) – 6:24
6. "Brother" – 4:57
7. "You're Somewhere Thinking of Me" – 3:23

== Personnel ==
- Yusef Lateef – alto saxophone, tenor saxophone, flute, (track 4) oboe, vocals
- Hugh Lawson – piano
- Cecil McBee – bass
- Roy Brooks – drums
- Sylvia Shemwell – tambourine (tracks 1 & 5)
