= Beans Bowles =

Thomas "Beans" Bowles
- Born: Thomas Harold Bowles; May 7, 1926; South Bend, Indiana, U.S.
- Died: January 28, 2000 (aged 73) Detroit, Michigan, U.S.
- Genres: Jazz, R&B, soul
- Occupations: Session musician, bandleader, tour manager, musical director
- Instruments: Baritone saxophone, flute
- Years active: 1940s–1990s

Thomas Harold "Beans" Bowles (May 7, 1926 – January 28, 2000) was an American jazz and session musician, primarily known as a baritone saxophonist and flutist with Motown Records' house band, the Funk Brothers. He played the flute solo on the studio version of Stevie Wonder's "Fingertips" (from The Jazz Soul of Little Stevie, 1962), and arranged "Fingertips Part II." Beyond performing, Bowles served as a tour manager for the Motortown Revue, musical director for acts like Smokey Robinson & the Miracles, and an influential mentor in Detroit's music scene.

== Early life ==
Bowles was born in South Bend, Indiana, on May 7, 1926. He moved to Detroit in 1944 to attend Wayne State University but soon left to join a U.S. Navy band, performing nationally and internationally during his service. After his discharge, he became active in Detroit's jazz scene, playing at venues like the Flame Showbar and Frolic Show Bar alongside artists such as Billie Holiday, Billy Eckstine, and Wynonie Harris.

== Career ==
Bowles joined Motown in the late 1950s, contributing baritone saxophone to early releases, including Marv Johnson's "Come to Me" (Tamla's first single, 1959). He played the flute solo on the studio version of Stevie Wonder's "Fingertips" (from The Jazz Soul of Little Stevie, 1962), and arranged "Fingertips Part II." His flute work also appeared on Marvin Gaye's "Stubborn Kind of Fellow" and "What's Going On", while his saxophone featured on The Supremes' "Baby Love" and Martha and the Vandellas' "Heat Wave".

In addition to session work, Bowles held key behind-the-scenes roles. He helped organize the Motortown Revue tours with Esther Gordy Edwards, serving as road manager and chaperone during the civil rights era, enforcing discipline and lecturing young artists on behavior. He survived a serious car accident during a 1962 tour stop in South Carolina that killed his assistant. Bowles later acted as musical director for Smokey Robinson & the Miracles and the Four Tops.

He left Motown in the mid-1960s. Post-Motown, he worked at the 20 Grand club, co-founded Three Bee's Production Co. with his sons, acted in theater productions (including Ma Rainey's Black Bottom), and directed the Graystone Jazz Museum orchestra while mentoring young players like James Carter.

== Death ==
Bowles was diagnosed with prostate cancer in 1992 and died on January 28, 2000, in Detroit at age 73. He is buried at Elmwood Cemetery in Detroit. Stevie Wonder paid tribute at his funeral, calling him an "angel on Earth."

== Legacy ==
Bowles was remembered by Motown figures like Stevie Wonder, Gladys Knight, and Smokey Robinson for his musicianship, mentorship, and contributions to the label's early success. His story features in retrospectives like Standing in the Shadows of Motown (2002 documentary) and his partial autobiography (compiled by son Dennis Bowles), Dr. Beans Bowles "Fingertips" The Untold Story (2003). He is often described as an "unsung hero" of Motown's formative years.
