= The Free Slave =

Live album by Roy Brooks
- Released: 1972
- Recorded: April 26, 1970; Left Bank Jazz Society, Baltimore, Maryland
- Genres: Hard bop, soul jazz, post-bop
- Length: 46:02
- Labels: Muse; MR 5003
- Producer: Roy Brooks

Roy Brooks chronology
Beat (1963)	The Free Slave (1972)	Ethnic Expressions (1973)

The Free Slave is a live album by drummer Roy Brooks recorded in 1970 and released on the Muse label in 1972. It was the third album released on the label.

== Reception ==
The Free Slave, according to Jim Dulzo in JazzTimes in 2003, "catches a live 1970 set with a band of stellar hard boppers that includes a very young Woody Shaw, plus George Coleman, Hugh Lawson and Cecil McBee. McBee and Brooks lay down a funky, intelligent groove and the band burns brightly through four extended tunes."

== Track listing ==
All compositions by Roy Brooks except as indicated

1. "The Free Slave" – 12:18
2. "Understanding" – 10:57
3. "Will Pan's Walk" (Cecil McBee) – 9:07
4. "Five for Max" – 13:40

== Personnel ==
- Roy Brooks – drums
- Woody Shaw – trumpet
- George Coleman – tenor saxophone
- Hugh Lawson – piano
- Cecil McBee – bass
