= Yusef Lateef =

American jazz musician (1920–2013)

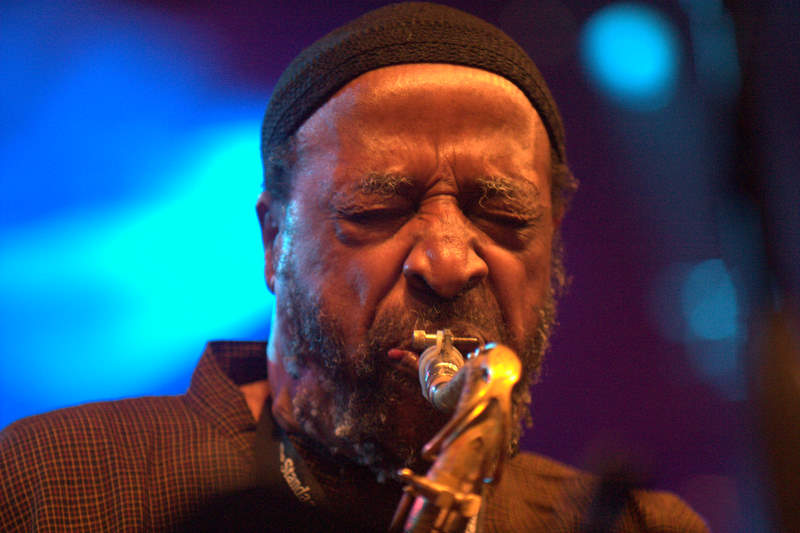
- Lateef in a 2007 performance

Background information
- Also known as: Yusef Lateef
- Born: William Emanuel Huddleston; October 9, 1920; Chattanooga, Tennessee, U.S.
- Died: December 23, 2013 (aged 93) Shutesbury, Massachusetts, U.S.
- Genres: New-age, jazz, post-bop, jazz fusion, swing, hard bop, third stream, world music
- Occupations: Musician, composer, educator, spokesman, author
- Instruments: Tenor saxophone, flute, oboe, bassoon, bamboo flute, shehnai, shofar, arghul, koto, piano, vocals.
- Years active: 1938–2013
- Labels: Savoy, Prestige, Verve, Riverside, Impulse, Atlantic, CTI, YAL
- Formerly of: Cannonball Adderley band
- Website: yuseflateef.com

Yusef Abdul Lateef (born William Emanuel Huddleston; October 9, 1920 – December 23, 2013) was an American jazz multi-instrumentalist, composer, and prominent figure among the Ahmadiyya Community in the United States.

Although Lateef's main instruments were the tenor saxophone and flute, he also played oboe and bassoon, both rare in jazz, and non-western instruments such as the bamboo flute, shehnai, shofar, xun, arghul and koto. He is known for having been an innovator in the blending of jazz with "Eastern" music. Peter Keepnews, in his New York Times obituary of Lateef, wrote that the musician "played world music before world music had a name".

Lateef's books included two novellas titled A Night in the Garden of Love and Another Avenue, the short story collections Spheres and Rain Shapes, and his autobiography, The Gentle Giant, written in collaboration with Herb Boyd. Along with his record label YAL Records, Lateef owned Fana Music, a music publishing company. He published his own work through Fana, including Yusef Lateef's Flute Book of the Blues and many of his orchestral compositions.

== Biography ==
=== Early life and career ===
Lateef was born in Chattanooga, Tennessee, as William Emanuel Huddleston. His family moved, in 1923, to Lorain, Ohio, and again in 1925, to Detroit, Michigan, where his father changed the family's name to Evans.

Throughout his early life, Lateef came into contact with many Detroit-based jazz musicians who gained prominence, including vibraphonist Milt Jackson, bassist Paul Chambers, drummer Elvin Jones and guitarist Kenny Burrell. Lateef was a proficient saxophonist by the time of his graduation from high school at the age of 18, when he launched his professional career and began touring with a number of swing bands. The first instrument he bought was an alto saxophone but after a year he switched to the tenor saxophone, influenced by the playing of Lester Young.

In 1949, he was invited by Dizzy Gillespie to tour with his orchestra. In 1950, Lateef returned to Detroit and began his studies in composition and flute at Wayne State University.

It was during this period that he converted to Islam as a member of the Ahmadiyya Muslim Community and changed his name. He twice made the pilgrimage to Mecca.

=== Prominence ===
Lateef began recording as a leader in 1957 for Savoy Records, a non-exclusive association which continued until 1959; the earliest of Lateef's album's for the Prestige subsidiary New Jazz overlap with them. Musicians such as Wilbur Harden (trumpet, flugelhorn), bassist Herman Wright, drummer Frank Gant, and pianist Hugh Lawson were among his collaborators during this period. In 1960, they played an extended gig at the Minor Key, a non-alcoholic club at Dexter and Burlingame in Detroit.

By 1961, with the recording of Into Something and Eastern Sounds, Lateef's dominant presence within a group context had emerged. His "Eastern" influences are clearly audible in all of these recordings, with spots for instruments like the rahab, shanai, arghul, koto and a collection of Chinese wooden flutes and bells along with his tenor and flute. Even his use of the western oboe sounds exotic in this context; it is not a standard jazz instrument. Indeed, the tunes themselves are a mixture of jazz standards, blues and film music usually performed with a piano/bass/drums rhythm section in support. Lateef made numerous contributions to other people's albums, including during his period as a member of saxophonist Cannonball Adderley's Sextet during 1962–64.

In the late 1960s, he began to incorporate contemporary soul and gospel phrasing into his music (albeit with a strong blues underlay) on albums such as Detroit and Hush 'N' Thunder, presaging the emergence of jazz fusion. Lateef expressed a dislike of the terms "jazz" and "jazz musician" as musical generalizations. As is so often the case with such generalizations, the use of these terms does understate the breadth of his sound. In the 1980s, Lateef experimented with new-age and spiritual elements.

In 1960, Lateef returned to school, studying flute at the Manhattan School of Music in New York City. He received a bachelor's degree in music in 1969 and a master's degree in music education in 1970. Starting in 1971, he taught courses in "autophysiopsychic music" at the Manhattan School of Music, and he became an associate professor at the Borough of Manhattan Community College.

In 1975, Lateef received an Ed.D. from the University of Massachusetts Amherst; his dissertation was a comparative study of Western and Islamic education. Thereafter, he served as a senior research fellow at the Center for Nigerian Cultural Studies at Ahmadu Bello University throughout the early 1980s. Returning to the United States in 1986, he took a joint faculty appointment at the University of Massachusetts Amherst and Hampshire College.

=== Later career ===
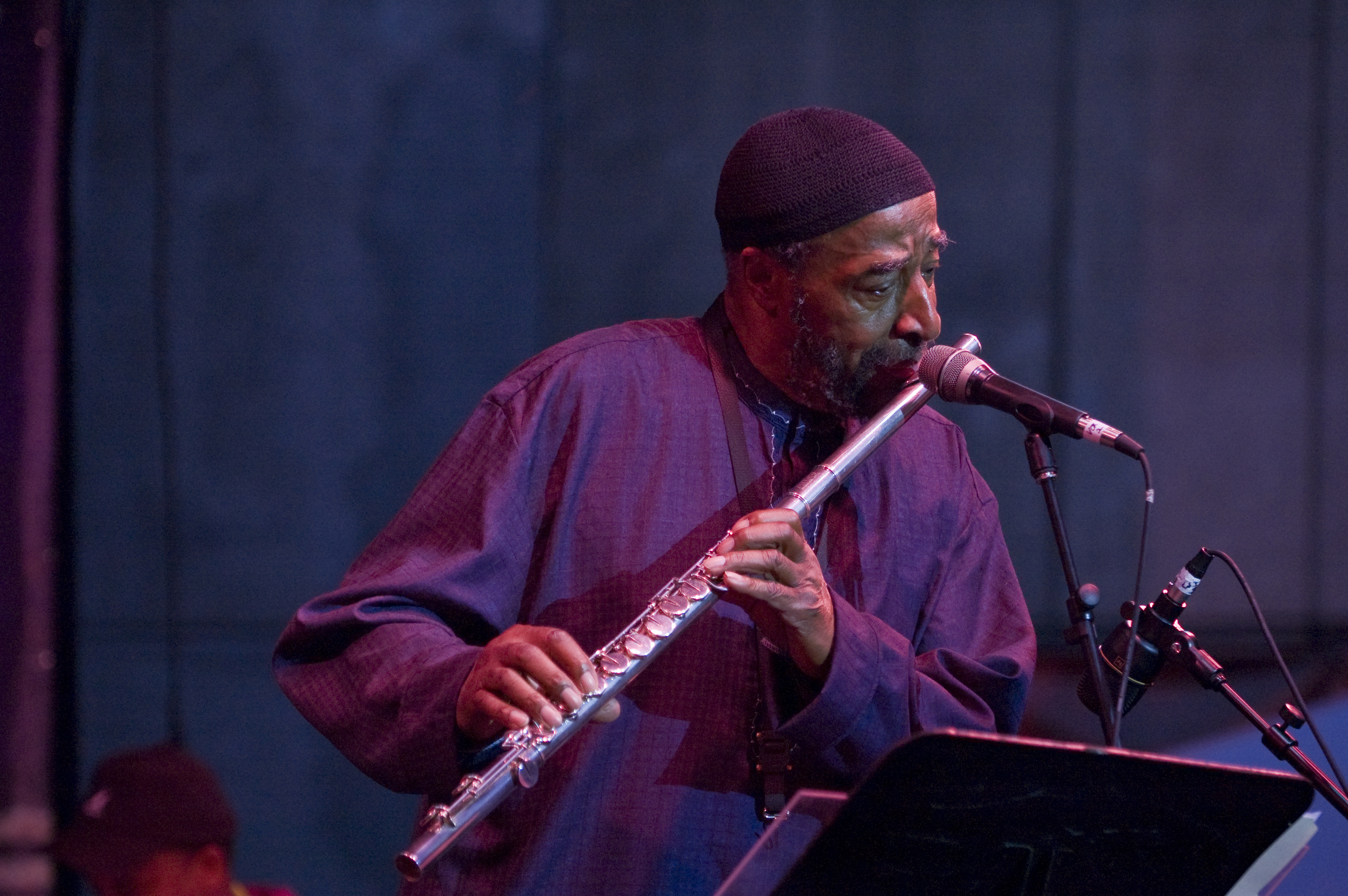
Lateef performing in 2007 at the Detroit Jazz Festival

His 1987 album Yusef Lateef's Little Symphony won the Grammy Award for Best New Age Recording His core influences, however, were clearly rooted in jazz, and in his own words: "My music is jazz."

In 1992, Lateef founded YAL Records. In 1993, he was commissioned by the WDR Radio Orchestra Cologne to compose The African American Epic Suite, a four-part work for orchestra and quartet, based on themes of slavery and disfranchisement in the United States. The piece has since been performed by the Atlanta Symphony Orchestra and the Detroit Symphony Orchestra.

In 2005, Nicolas Humbert & Werner Penzel, directors of Step Across The Border, filmed Brother Yusef, in his wooden house in the middle of a forest in Massachusetts. In 2010, he received the lifetime Jazz Master Fellowship Award from the National Endowment for the Arts (NEA), an independent federal agency. Established in 1982, the National Endowment for the Arts Jazz Masters award is the highest honor given in jazz.

The Manhattan School of Music, where Lateef had earned a bachelor's and a master's degree, awarded him its Distinguished Alumni Award in 2012.

His last albums were recorded for Adam Rudolph's Meta Records. To the end of his life, Lateef continued to teach at the University of Massachusetts Amherst, Smith College, and Hampshire College in western Massachusetts. Lateef died of prostate cancer on the morning of December 23, 2013, at the age of 93, survived by his wife, Ayesha, and son, Yusef.

Following his death, Lateef's family auctioned off many of his instruments, in the hopes that they would continue to be played. Woodwind player Jeff Coffin purchased Lateef's main tenor saxophone, as well as his bass flute.

In October 2020, the UMass Fine Arts Center celebrated the centenary of Lateef's birth by producing "Yusef Lateef: A Centenary Celebration", a major online exhibit of his work curated by Glenn Siegel and others. The centenary includes "100 Responses to Yusef Lateef", a series of video tributes by many prominent artists and former Lateef collaborators and students.

== Publications ==
- Repository of Scales and Melodic Patterns. Massachusetts: Fana Music. 1981.
- Ziky Kofoworola; Yusef Lateef (1987). Hausa Performing Arts and Music. Nigeria: Department of Culture, Federal Ministry of Information and Culture.
- Night in the Garden of Love. Massachusetts: Alnur Music. 1988.
- Yusef Lateef; Herb Boyd (2005). The Gentle Giant: The Autobiography of Yusef Lateef. Morton Books Inc.

== Personal life ==
Lateef said that what he remembered most about his childhood was "My passion for nature."

In 1980, Lateef declared that he would no longer perform any place where alcohol was served. In 1999, he said: "Too much blood, sweat and tears have been spilled creating this music to play it where people are smoking, drinking and talking."

Lateef's first wife, Tahira, predeceased him, as did a son and a daughter.
