= Derro =

Derro may refer to:

- Derro, oilfield discovered in 1977 by SPC Samoco close to Deir ez Zor Syria
- Derro, a slang Australian term for a dishevelled & unkempt person - synonymous with the American term wino. Abbreviated from Derelict
- Derro, an evil subrace of underdark-dwelling dwarves in the Dungeons & Dragons role-playing game.

== See also ==
- Dero (disambiguation)
