= Frank Marocco =

American accordionist, arranger and composer

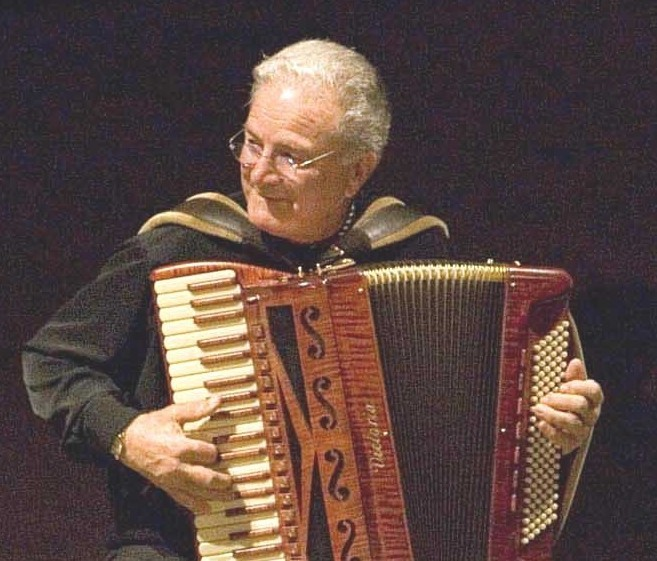
- Frank Marocco, May 2008

Background information
- Born: January 2, 1931; Joliet, Illinois
- Origin: Waukegan, Illinois, USA
- Died: March 3, 2012 (aged 81) San Fernando Valley, California
- Genre: Jazz - Classical
- Occupations: Musician, Arranger, Composer
- Instruments: Accordion, piano, clarinet
- Years active: 1948–2012
- Labels: Verve; Discovery; Command

Frank L. Marocco (January 2, 1931 – March 3, 2012) was an American piano-accordionist, arranger and composer. He was recognized as one of the most recorded accordionists in the world.

== Background ==
Born in Joliet, Illinois Frank Marocco grew up in Waukegan, near Chicago. At the age of seven years, his parents enrolled him in a six-week beginner class for learning to play the accordion.

== Education ==
Marocco's first teacher was George Stefani, who supervised the young accordionist for nine years. Although they began studying classical music, Stefani soon encouraged young Frank to explore other musical genres. In addition to the accordion, Frank studied piano and clarinet, as well as music theory, harmony, and composition. Later on, he studied with Andy Rizzo, a well-known American concert accordionist and teacher.

== Career ==
At the age of 17, Frank Marocco won the first prize in the 1948 Chicago Musicland festival, and was rewarded with a guest performance with the Chicago Pops Orchestra playing Chopin's Fantasie Impromptu. His success encouraged him to embark on a professional music career. He established a trio, which toured in the Midwestern states. After he met his wife, Anne, in Indiana, the couple moved to Los Angeles, California, in the early 1950s.

In the Los Angeles vicinity, Marocco created a new band, which toured hotels and clubs in Las Vegas, Lake Tahoe, and Palm Springs. Later on, he began working in Hollywood, where television studios and movie production companies provided him a successful career.

In the 1960s, Frank Marocco recorded a solo album released by Verve, a legendary jazz record label. In 1966, he worked together with Brian Wilson and the Beach Boys, and performed on the world-famous album Pet Sounds.

Marocco performed on a USO tour in Japan, South Korea, Vietnam, Thailand, Philippines, Guam, and other countries in the Pacific, appearing onstage with Bob Hope. He also played in the Les Brown big band, during six Love Boat cruises. Marocco performed in collaboration with hundreds of world-famous artists and conductors during his career, both on stage as well as in studio. As a musician, he contributed to hundreds of movie soundtracks, television shows and TV-series. The National Academy of Recording Arts and Sciences nominated him as the most valuable player eight years in a row.

In addition to his career as a musician, Marocco wrote and arranged music for solo, duet, and orchestra in a wide variety of musical styles, including jazz, popular standards, international, Latin, religious, and classical. He was the musical director and conductor of an annual "music camp", the Frank Marocco Accordion Event, which is held in Mesa, Arizona in January. The event brings together over 50 accordionists from around the U.S. and Canada, who, after three full days of instruction, rehearsal, and recreational activities, present a full concert of accordion music.

Frank Marocco also played with some of the most notable jazz musicians in America and Europe; Ray Brown, Jeff Hamilton, Zoot Sims, Joe Pass, Joey Baron, Herb Ellis, Ray Pizzi, Ivor Malherbe, Carlo Atti, Sam Most, Gian-Carlo Bianchetti, Jacob Fisher, Pekka Sarmanto, Martin Classen, Andy Martin, Tuomo Dahlblom, Ric Todd, Harold Jones, Gerry Gibbs, Mikko Hassinen, Conti Candoli, Philippe Cornaz, John Patitucci, Mads Vinding, Mogens Baekgaard Andersen, Marcel Papaux, Aage Tanggaard, Ron Feuer, Richard Galliano, Peter Erskine, Klaus Paier, Renzo Ruggieri, Massimo Tagliata, Pete Christlieb, Larry Koonse, Simone Zanchini, Andy Simpkins, Bob Shepard, Frank Rosolino, Jim Hall, Abraham Laboriel, Grant Geissman, Luis Conte and Stix Hooper just to name a few.

== Personal life ==
Frank and Anne Marocco had three daughters, Cynthia, Lisa and Venetia. Cynthia pursued a music career. She studied the flute and at age 13, had the distinction of being the youngest player in the American Youth Symphony, a group of high school and college musicians directed by Mehli Mehta. Lisa, attracted to dance, became a professional pair skater and toured for several seasons with the Ice Capades. Venetia was a physical Therapy instructor and is now a school teacher. The three Marocco daughters are married. Frank and Anne had eight grandchildren in all.

Frank died on March 3, 2012, at his home in California’s San Fernando Valley. He had been hospitalized earlier at Cedars-Sinai Medical Center in Los Angeles for complications following hip replacement surgery, his daughter Cynthia said. He was 81 years old.

== Recordings ==
=== Jazz and Evergreens ===
- "Two for the Road", Artist Signed Records 2011, together with Daniele di Bonaventura
- "CHANGES", Artist Signed Records 2010
- "Jazz on the Road", Karthause-Schmülling 2009
- "Cammino dritto", con Marea 2008
- "Be-bop buffet", 2006, together with Simone Zanchini
- "Just Friends", 2006
- "Back in Time", 2006
- Frank Marocco "Beyond the Sea" 2004-1-CD (Acoustic accordion, including French and Italian music)
- Frank Marocco Group "Appassionato" 2003-1-CD
- Frank Marocco Group "Made in Germany" CD
- Frank Marocco Quartet "Freedom Flight" SAB-010-CD
- "Brazilian Waltz" -Discovery-DS949-CD
- "Ballad for Anne" -Discovery-DS950-CD
- "A Nite in Marocco" AMNFM-03-CD
- "Frank Marocco Quintet Live" CD
- "Turn out the Stars" AMNFM 04 CD
- "Evergreens" Frank Marocco-AMNFM 02-CD, 1992
- "Like Frank Marocco", Verve

In addition to his solo recordings, Frank Marocco performed on numerous studio recordings as accompanist to various artists. His best-known contributions include Pet Sounds by Brian Wilson in 1966, and Crossroads by Tracy Chapman in 1989.

=== Classical recordings ===
- Recorded Kammermusic #1' (Hindemith) with Los Angeles Chamber Orchestra
- Gerard Schwarz conducting on Nonesuch #79077
- American Ballet Company - "The Informer" with Mikhail Baryshnikov
- Pavorotti concert - Pacific Symphony
- Los Angeles Chamber Orchestra concert, conducted by Gerard Schwarz
- Los Angeles Philharmonic Orchestra concert - Maxim Shostakovitch
- San Diego Symphony concert - Maxim Shostakovitch
- Hollywood Bowl Orchestra concerts - Johnny Green, conducted by John Mauceri
- Roger Wagner Chorale concerts - Los Angeles Music Center
- Recorded the Music for Chekov plays, - Amundson Theater Los Angeles Music center
- Recorded Classical / Jazz Chamber Group concert - Chistopher Calliendo, Shoenberg Hall, University of California, Los Angeles
- Three Penny Opera - Los Angeles Philharmonic - conducted by John Adams
- La Scala Ballet Co. "Amarcord" Ballet- Orange county performing Arts Center
- Kurt Weill concert - John Anson Ford Theater Hollywood with Roger Kelloway and Robin Ford
- PDQ Bach concert with Pasadena Symphony - conducted by George Mester

=== Videos ===
- Jazz Accordion in Concert, 1990, 1992, 1996, 2003 Four volumes with Ken Olendorf and Merle Allen Sanders
