= Al Tinney =

American jazz pianist (1921–2002)

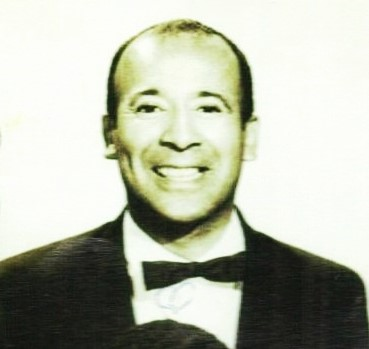
- Tinney in 1954

Background information
- Born: Allen Tinney; May 28, 1921; Ansonia, Connecticut, U.S.
- Origin: New York City, U.S.
- Died: December 11, 2002 (aged 81) Buffalo, New York, U.S.
- Genres: Jazz; bebop; R&B; pop
- Instrument: Piano
- Years active: 1935–2002
- Formerly of: The Jive Bombers

Allen Tinney (May 28, 1921 – December 11, 2002) was an American jazz pianist.

== Early life ==
Born in Ansonia, Connecticut, Tinney was a child actor and was a cast member in the original production of George Gershwin's Porgy and Bess in 1935. As a child, he lived with his family in Greenwich Village and Harlem in New York City. He led the house band at Monroe's from 1939 to 1943, which featured Charlie Parker, Max Roach, Benny Harris, George Treadwell, and Victor Coulsen. He was an influential bebop pianist, whose style can be heard echoed in the playing of Bud Powell, George Wallington, Al Haig, and Duke Jordan.

== Career ==
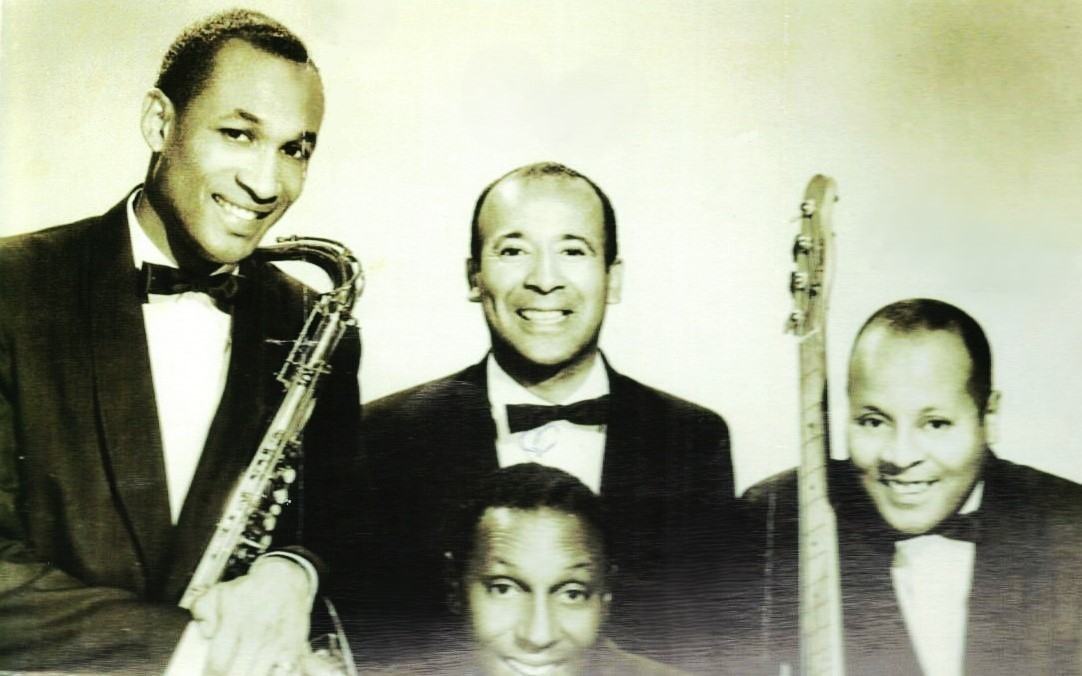
Tinney with The Jive Bombers in 1954. From left: Earl Johnson, Tinney, Clarence Palmer, and William "Pee Wee" Tinney.

From January 1943 to May 1946, Tinney served in the United States Army. After 1946, he began to play increasingly in other styles and outlets. He was a member of the one-hit wonder group The Jive Bombers in 1957. In 1968 he moved to Buffalo, New York, where he worked locally in jazz music, did work in a state prison music program, and lectured at SUNY Buffalo. He recorded an album with Peggy Farrell (Margaret Alice Farrell), Peg & Al, for Border City Records in 2000.

Later in life, Tinney often played at the historic Colored Musicians Club in downtown Buffalo or with Peggy Farrell's house band. Tinney spent much of his free time supporting the local arts and music scene in Buffalo, and would often be seen in the Allentown, Johnson Park, and Elmwood Village neighborhoods in Buffalo.

== Personal life ==
Tinney died in Buffalo, New York, in 2002.
