= Pat Moran McCoy =

American jazz pianist

- Born: Helen Mudgett; 1934 (age 90–91); Enid, Oklahoma, U.S.
- Genres: Jazz
- Occupation: Musician
- Instrument: Piano
- Years active: 1957–2007
- Labels: Bethlehem, Audio Fidelity

Pat Moran (born 1934 in Enid, Oklahoma) is an American jazz pianist.

== Early life and education ==
Born Helen Mudgett, Pat Moran (Note: Moran McCoy is referred to in various sources by different names, among them most commonly: Pat Moran, Patti Moran McCoy and sometimes Patti McCoy.) began playing piano very young and at age 11 she performed Rachmaninoff’s Piano Concerto No. 2 with the Oklahoma Symphony. She studied a year at Phillips University and later at the Cincinnati Conservatory of Music under Jenő Takács. While playing for fun in the Cincinnati Conservatory student lounges, she was introduced to booking agent Clyde Task. At his suggestion, she change her name to Pat Moran.

== Career ==
She began her career as a concert pianist but eventually moved on to jazz. She founded the Pat Moran Quartet, which later became the Pat Moran Trio, and played New York's Hickory House, the Birdland and the Blue Note concerts in Chicago. In subsequent iterations of her band, Moran performed with singer Beverly Kelly, bassist John Doling, and drummer John Whited. In the mid-1950s, she released two albums for Bethlehem Records.

In April 1957, Moran's quartet performed at Birdland, accompanied by a brass section, with arrangements by Nat Pierce. Moran later released two more albums for the Audio Fidelity label: Beverly Kelly Sings with the Pat Moran Trio and the Trio album This Is Pat Moran with Scott LaFaro on bass and Gene Gammage on drums. She also performed with Mel Tormé, Oscar Pettiford, and the Terry Gibbs Dream Band from late 1960 through 1962. McCoy was featured in a book by Ray Avery (photographer) called Stars of Jazz (1998).

In the early 1980s, Moran released an album of children's songs, Shakin' Loose with Mother Goose, in collaboration with Steve Allen and Jayne Meadows. The album's companion book was awarded the American Book Award. In later years, she performed occasionally, and was featured by National Public Radio's jazz programming, including "Piano Jazz" with Marian McPartland. Moran is also featured in the Romancing the West Legacy Tour touring documentary and performance series. McCoy was inducted into the Oklahoma Jazz Hall of Fame in 2018.

== Discography ==
- The Pat Moran Quartet (Bethlehem, 1956)
- The Pat Moran Quartet While at Birdland (Bethlehem, 1957)
- Beverly Kelly Sings with the Pat Moran Trio (Audio Fidelity, 1957 / SSJ (Japan), ed. 2009)
- This Is Pat Moran ((Audio Fidelity, 1958)

With Mel Tormé, Frances Faye

- Porgy & Bess, A Jazz Version of Highlights From The Opera (Bethlehem, 1956)

With Terry Gibbs

- That Swing Thing! (Verve, 1961)
- Straight Ahead (Verve, 1962)
- Main Stem Volume 4 (Contemporary, 1962)

Reissues

- Pat Moran: Complete Trio Sessions (Fresh Sound Records, 2007) is a reissue of the two (Audio Fidelity sessions from 1958.
- The Legendary Scott LaFaro (Japan, Teichiku, 1978) is a partial reissue of This Is Pat Moran

As Pat Moran McKoy

- The Gospel Truth (Brio Records, 1997)
- Jesus in Paris (Brio Records, 2001)
- A Christmas Suite (Brio Records, 2010)
- David Zaslow, Pat Moran McKoy A Be Bop Poetry (Brio Records, 2011)
