= Victor Coulsen =

American jazz trumpeter

- Also known as: Vic Coulsen, Vic Coulson, Vic Couslen
- Origin: New York City
- Genres: Jazz; bebop
- Occupation: Musician
- Instrument: Trumpet
- Years active: 1940–1945

Victor "Vic" Coulsen (dates unknown) was an American jazz trumpeter.

== Biography ==
Often referred to as Vic Coulsen, Vic Coulson, and even Vic Couslen, Coulsen was a member of the resident band at the Monroe's club, under Al Tinney's direction from as early as 1940.

Coulsen has often been remembered as having had a seminal influence on the phrasing of early bebop by the likes of Thelonious Monk, Miles Davis, Dizzy Gillespie and several others, Charlie Parker among them. Parker remembers Coulsen (here spelled "Coulson") "playing things I'd never heard before" and states that the music he heard on those nights at Monroe's caused him to quit Jay McShann's band and relocate to New York City.

These testimonies make Coulsen one of the founding fathers (albeit a minor one) of the bebop idiom. Unfortunately, Coulsen never recorded, except for some tracks taken in 1944 with an orchestra led by Coleman Hawkins, where he performs in the trumpet section, taking no solos.

Nothing is known of Coulsen's early life. After 1945, according to Al Tinney's testimony, Coulsen became an alcoholic (a "wino", in Tinney's words), falling back into obscurity.

== Discography ==
With Coleman Hawkins

- Rainbow Mist (Delmark, 1944 [1992]) – compilation of Apollo recordings
