= List of Hunter × Hunter episodes =

Hunter x Hunter episodes

List of Hunter × Hunter episodes may refer to:

- List of Hunter × Hunter (1999 TV series) episodes
- List of Hunter × Hunter (2011 TV series) episodes
- List of Hunter × Hunter OVA episodes
