= List of Hunter × Hunter (1999 TV series) episodes =

Cover of the first Hunter × Hunter box set, released in North America on December 9, 2008

Hunter × Hunter is an anime television series based on the manga series of the same name written and illustrated by Yoshihiro Togashi which aired from 1999 to 2001. The story focuses on a young boy named Gon Freecss, who one day discovers that the father he had always been told was dead is in fact alive and well. He learns that his father, Ging, is a famous "Hunter": an individual who has proven themself an elite member of humanity. Despite the fact that Ging left his son with his relatives in order to pursue his own dreams, Gon becomes determined to follow in his father's footsteps, pass the rigorous "Hunter Examination", and eventually find his father to become a Hunter in his own right.

Hunter × Hunter was produced by Nippon Animation and directed by Kazuhiro Furuhashi. A total of 62 episodes were broadcast on Fuji Television and its affiliates from October 16, 1999, to March 31, 2001. The series has additionally aired on the satellite television station Animax. Marvelous Entertainment released all episodes of the series in Japan on DVD in 13 separate volumes between September 20, 2000, and September 19, 2001.

Viz Media licensed the Hunter × Hunter anime for distribution in the Region 1 market, where it was released across four DVD box-sets. The first set was released on December 9, 2008, and the final was released on December 1, 2009. Starting with the second volume, Viz partnered with Warner Home Video in distributing the DVDs. Hunter × Hunter began airing in the United States on the Funimation Channel in the spring of 2009.

The background music for the Hunter × Hunter anime and the three OVA series was composed by Toshihiko Sahashi. The anime series features two opening themes, "Ohayō." (おはよう。; lit. "Good Morning.") [01–48] by Keno and "Taiyō Wa Yoru mo Kagayaku" (太陽は夜も輝く; lit. "The Sun Shines at Night") [49–62] by Wino, and three closing themes: "Kaze no Uta" (風のうた; lit. "Wind Song") [01–31] by Minako Honda, and "EJan-Do You Feel Like I Feel?" (Eじゃん-Do You Feel Like I Feel?), [32–50] and "Hotaru" (蛍; lit. "Firefly"), [51–62] both by Nagai Masato.

== Episodes ==
=== Hunter Exam arc ===
No.	Title	Original release date
1	"A Boy Setting Out for a Journey × Leaving Behind the Sound of the Wind"; Transliteration: "Tabi iku shōnen × Kaze no oto wo nokoshite" (Japanese: 旅行く少年×風の音を残して)	October 16, 1999
Gon has a run-in with a fox-bear in the forest. A mysterious stranger saves Gon, killing the beast. Gon prevents him from killing a Fox-bear cub, and the man tells him about the Hunter Exam. Gon then raises the Fox-bear cub while deciding to take the Hunter Exam when he is old enough.
2	"Encounter × Hesitation × Departure"; Transliteration: "Deai × Tomadoi × Shukko" (Japanese: 出会い×とまどい×出航)	October 23, 1999
Gon's aunt Mito gives him the go ahead to take the Hunter Exam after he has successfully passed her test, using a special rod from his father. Gon goes to town to catch a ship to the exam. In town, Gon befriends Leorio, after several run-ins with each other through the town. Leorio is also intent on taking the exam, and they take down a cruel animal show. In the end, they almost miss the ship, but through Gon's quick thinking, they manage to board the ship at the last minute.
3	"Pride × Stormy Water × Duel"; Transliteration: "Puraido × Araumi × Kettō" (Japanese: プライド×荒海×決闘)	October 30, 1999
On the ship to the exam, Gon and Leorio meet Kurapika. The captain asks each for their reason to be a Hunter. Gon wants to find his father, Leorio wants to be rich, and Kurapika wants to be a force for justice.
4	"Decision × Shortcut × Detour"; Transliteration: "Sentaku × Chikamichi × Mawari michi" (Japanese: 選択×近道×まわり道)	November 6, 1999
The ship's captain recommends they go towards a tree on the top of a mountain instead of directly at their goal. Leorio takes the bus and the rest head towards the tree. The bus is a trap, so Leorio abandons it and catches up with Gon and Kurapika. Matthew, an examinee they meet, travels with them and then betrays them. They successfully answer a riddle asked by an examiner and move on to the next test.
5	"Lies × Truth? × Kiriko"; Transliteration: "Uso × Honto? × Kiriko" (Japanese: ウソ×ホント?×キリコ)	November 13, 1999
Gon, Kurapika and Leorio continue on the test, arriving at a cabin in the woods. A husband and wife say they have been attacked by beasts, when a beast shows up and kidnaps the wife. Leorio stays to treat the husband's wounds as Gon and Kurapika help the wife. In the end it turns out the couple and the beasts are a family and they find the group worthy of continuing to the next test.
6	"Steak × Marathon × The Exam Starts"; Transliteration: "Suteeki × Marason × Shiken kaishi" (Japanese: ステーキ×マラソン×試験開始)	November 20, 1999
Gon, Kurapika, and Leorio reach the first stage of the Hunter Exam, a seemingly endless forced run through a tunnel leading by the examiner named Satotz. They are befriended by Tonpa, a man taking the exam for the 35th time, and meet Killua, another entrant. In the end Tonpa betrays Leorio, as Gon and Kurapika go looking for them.
7	"Trauma × Limit × Sweet Trap"; Transliteration: "Torauma × Genkai × Amai wana" (Japanese: トラウマ×限界×甘いワナ)	November 27, 1999
Tonpa has placed Leorio and another examinee near hallucinogenic sap. In a dream state, he explains that he wants to be a Hunter to get money so he can become a doctor who does not charge for his services. Gon and Killua bond. At the end of the first stage, a man appears to accuse the examiner of being a fake.
8	"Conjurer × Smile × Beasts Beware"; Transliteration: "Kijutsushi × Hohoemi × Mōjū chūi" (Japanese: 奇術師×ほほえみ×猛獣注意)	December 4, 1999
Hisoka determines the real examiner by flinging deadly playing cards at each man, reasoning the true Hunter will live, and it is Satotz. Later, he plays at being an examiner and kills many examinees. Although Hisoka is able to kill all of his intended victims, he recognizes that Gon and Leorio are special and lets them live.
9	"Menchi × Furious × Second Phase?"; Transliteration: "Menchi × Majigire × Niji shiken" (Japanese: メンチ×マジギレ×二次試験?)	December 11, 1999
The group starts stage 2 of the test, which is to satisfy Gourmet Hunters Buhara and Menchi with their cooking. Everyone satisfies Buhara's taste for BBQ pork, but they all fail to make sushi good enough for Menchi. She says all examinees fail.
10	"Failing × Panic × Heavenly Voice"; Transliteration: "Akaten × Panikku × Ten no koe" (Japanese: 赤点×パニック×天の声)	December 18, 1999
While one of the examinees, wrestler Todo, criticizes Menchi and all Gourmet Hunters, Netero, the head examiner and Hunter Association's president, arrives and asks Menchi to give everyone another chance. The test takers collect spider eagle eggs, and Todo learns to respect Gourmet Hunters, vowing to return and take the test again.
11	"Exploration × Guts × Stowaway"; Transliteration: "Tanken × Supokon × Mikkōsha" (Japanese: 探検×スポ根×密航者)	January 8, 2000
The protagonists and others have passed the second stage, and they fly towards the next stage on a blimp. Anita, a girl who failed the earlier test, sneaks aboard to get revenge on Killua for the death of her father. The Hunters capture her, and Chairman Netero offers to free her if Gon and Killua can take a ball from him.
12	"Good Boy? × Bad Boy? × Killua"; Transliteration: "Yoi ko? × Warui ko? × Kirua" (Japanese: 良い子?×悪い子?×キルア)	January 15, 2000
Killua stops trying to take the ball from Netero because his killer instincts are surfacing. Anita escapes her handlers and attacks Killua, who comes close to killing Anita, but lets her live because otherwise Gon would get mad at him. Gon is never able to get the ball, but makes Netero use his left leg and both hands once, and is satisfied.
13	"Pro × Con × Trap"; Transliteration: "Sansei × Hantai × Otoshiana" (Japanese: 賛成×反対×落とし穴)	January 22, 2000
The objective of stage 3 is to get down from a tower alive. The group is forced to team up with Tonpa, and their test is to win 3 out of 5 matches against tower prisoners. Tonpa takes the first match with a hardened-looking criminal, and promptly gives up. He explains that he doesn't want to be a Hunter, he just likes watching others fail and be killed.
14	"Candles × Policy × Dispute"; Transliteration: "Rōsoku × Porishī × Nakamawa ware" (Japanese: ローソク×ポリシー×なかま割れ)	January 29, 2000
Gon faces the next prisoner, Sedokan, in a match to see whose candle can burn the longest. Gon is given a candle that burns quickly, but because of this it is not susceptible to the wind, and Gon drops it on the floor and runs to blow out Sedokan candle. Kurapika engages in a death match with the next opponent, Majitani, but refuses to kill him after seeing red (literally) and knocking the criminal unconscious.
15	"Fleeting × Life × Majitani"; Transliteration: "Hakanai × Inochi × Majitani" (Japanese: はかない×いのち×マジタニ)	February 5, 2000
Majitani feigns unconsciousness in an attempt to run out the clock. Leorio and the leader of the prisoners bet on whether he is faking. Leorio holds the man above a long drop, and Majitani wakes up. He concedes the match to Kurapika, but the group loses a large chunk of their time because of the bet.
16	"Rock × Scissors × Heart"; Transliteration: "Gū × Choki × Hāto" (Japanese: グー×チョキ×ハート)	February 12, 2000
Leorio goes next. His opponent is Leroute, an attractive woman. He loses ten hours in bet to her so that he can grope her. He then loses the rest of their betting hours to her in a game of rock, paper, scissors. Killua then faces Johness the Dissector, a serial killer responsible for the murder of at least 146 people with his bare hands. Killua rips out his heart, explaining afterwards that Johness is an amateur and he is a pro.
17	"Three People? × Five People? × Last Choice"; Transliteration: "Sannin? × Gonin? × Saigo no sentaku" (Japanese: 3人?×5人?×最後の選択)	February 19, 2000
The last test to get out of the tower has two paths: one is too long and the other will only allow three of the five to enter. Leorio and Tonpa start fighting to see who will stay, when Gon thinks outside the box. They choose the longer path, destroy the wall between the paths with axes provided so they could fight, and all five make it.
18	"Treasure × Memory × Cramped Hotel Room"; Transliteration: "Otakara × Omoide × Hoteru no kobeya" (Japanese: お宝×思い出×ホテルの小部屋)	February 26, 2000
The successful examinees are taken by blimp to an island hotel. In order to pay for the rooms, they dive to collect treasure from sunken ships. Kurapika explains to Leorio that everyone from his clan was killed by the Phantom Troupe for their eyes. When a member of the Kurta clan dies with their emotions ablaze, their Eyes become Scarlet and are treated as treasures.
19	"Stranded × Log Book × Soaked"; Transliteration: "Barabara × Nisshi × Mizubitashi" (Japanese: バラバラ×日誌×水びたし)	March 4, 2000
The hotel owners leave the examinees stranded on the island. A map is found indicating another island nearby, and part of the group sets out immediately to find it, dying when a storm hits. Hanzo and Kurapika sense danger and are elected leaders of the people who stay. They learn of a storm that comes in daily waves, the second of which will submerge the island, so they have one day to escape.
20	"Big Waves × Big Cannon × Huge Rush"; Transliteration: "Ōnami × Taihō × Ōawate" (Japanese: 大波×大砲×大あわて)	March 11, 2000
The group works together to separate the battleship/hotel from the island before the second wave of the storm hits. Leorio gets stuck on the bottom of the ocean in a diving suit and Gon helps him escape. Gon is then saved by Hisoka. Kurapika is knocked out but the steering is done by a mysterious examinee who seems to be Hisoka's ally. They separate the ship just in time, and a blimp comes to pick them up.
21	"Fourth Phase × Forty-Four × Number of Death"; Transliteration: "Daiyonji × Yon Yon × Shi no Nambā" (Japanese: 第4次×44×死のナンバー)	March 18, 2000
The fourth stage of the Hunter Exam is a manhunt on Zevil Island. Each examinee must collect 6 points; their own number badge is worth 3, the number badge of their target is worth 3, and any other number badges are worth one point. Gon's target is Hisoka, and he practices catching birds with his fishing pole to prepare. He realizes he must attack Hisoka when Hisoka attacks his own target. Gon learns this by watching birds catch fish from the water.
22	"Found × Hide × Caught Up"; Transliteration: "Mitsuketa × Kakureta × Oitsuita" (Japanese: 見つけた×かくれた×追いついた)	March 25, 2000
Gon stalks Hisoka, and observes Hisoka's friend transform into his real appearance. Then Hisoka decides to hunt other participants for two more points.
23	"Hisoka × Crash × Gon"; Transliteration: "Hisoka × Gekitotsu × Gon" (Japanese: ヒソカ×激突×ゴン)	April 1, 2000
Gon gets Hisoka's number badge while Hisoka kills an examinee crossing his path. Gon is poisoned by Geretta and relieved of his badges. Hisoka kills Geretta easily and returns both badges: Gon's and his own. Gon tries to refuse it, but is unable to. Hisoka tells Gon he will kill him when the time is right, until then he will protect him. He punches him in the face and tells that he can return the badges only after he can return the punch.
24	"Damage × Reunion × Courage"; Transliteration: "Damēji × Saikai × Karagenki" (Japanese: ダメージ×再会×からげんき)	April 15, 2000
Several days pass as Gon recovers from being poisoned. Killua is stalked by Imori, one of Amori Brothers. Imori's brothers Umori and Amori show up, and Killua bests them and gets his number badge from Amori. All the protagonists now have their points except for Leorio, who goes looking for his target Ponzu. He finds her in a cave, but is poisoned by snakes. Gon and Kurapika go inside to help him.
25	"Slither × Stinger × In The Cave"; Transliteration: "Nyoronyoro × Chikuchiku × Ana no Naka" (Japanese: ニョロ2×チク2×穴の中)	April 22, 2000
Gon, Leorio and Kurapika become trapped in the cave with Ponzu. Leorio has been poisoned, and Gon gets bit numerous times to retrieve the antidote. Gon uses Ponzu's sleeping gas to put the snakes to sleep while holding his breath and rescuing everyone. Leorio takes Ponzu's number badge while she sleeps and Gon retrieves the number badges given to him by Hisoka, reasoning that it is OK to use them so that he can remain with his friends. The fourth stage ends.
26	"Chairman × Interview × Paper Test"; Transliteration: "Kaichō × Mensetsu × Pēpā Tesuto" (Japanese: 会長×面接×ペーパーテスト)	May 6, 2000
Chairman Netero interviews the nine remaining examinees (Gon, Kurapika, Leorio, Hisoka, Hanzo, Pokkle, Gittarackur, Bodoro, and Killua) in preparation for the final test. He asks each who they are interested in, and who would they least like to fight out of the nine. He then unveils a brackets system for the upcoming tournament between the remaining examinees.
27	"Hisoka × Kurapika × Spider's Whisper"; Transliteration: "Hisoka × Kurapika × Kumo no Sasayaki" (Japanese: ヒソカ×クラピカ×蜘蛛の囁き)	May 13, 2000
Hisoka and Kurapika fight in the first fight of the final stage. Hisoka toys with Kurapika at the beginning, but when Kurapika becomes angry they are on similar levels. This causes Hisoka to force himself to calm down. He then whispers something to Kurapika and declares himself the loser of the match. Kurapika is now a Hunter.
28	"Chatting × Excuses × Endurance"; Transliteration: "Oshaberi × Herikutsu × Konkurabe" (Japanese: おしゃべり×ヘリクツ×根くらべ)	May 20, 2000
The next fight is between Hanzo and Gon. Although Gon tries his hardest to combat Hanzo, it is obvious he is no match for the ninja. Hanzo severely injures Gon and breaks his arm, but Gon will not admit defeat. Gon feels that if he is ever to find his father, he must pass the Hunter Exam now.
29	"Pass × Fail × Exam Over"; Transliteration: "Gōkaku! × Shikkaku? × Shiken Shūryō" (Japanese: 合格!×失格?×試験終了)	May 27, 2000
Hanzo and Gon continue fighting. Hanzo is easily the better fighter, but when Gon won't concede, Hanzo is forced to accept defeat. Hanzo decides he'd rather lose than kill Gon, because he likes his attitude. Gon is knocked unconscious during the match and wakes up to find the matches are over. Satotz explains to him that he's a Hunter, and that Hisoka defeated Bodoro, Hanzo defeated Pokkle in a match, Killua conceded a match to Pokkle before facing his brother Illumi disguised as Gittarackur.
30	"Killua × Disqualified × Forced Out"; Transliteration: "Kirua × Ritaia × Kyōsei Sōkan" (Japanese: キルア×リタイア×強制送還)	June 3, 2000
Satotz explains to Gon that Killua failed the final stage. His opponent turns out to be his older brother Illumi in disguise. Illumi questions Killua and determines him unfit to be a normal person. He believes that Killua has a talent to be an assassin and tells him to return home. Illumi threatens to kill Gon if Killua even attempts to fight him, so Killua gives up and becomes silent for the rest of the exam. Killua murders Bodoro in the middle of his match with Leorio for no reason and is disqualified. Having heard this, Gon confronts Illumi and breaks his arm, deciding to go look for Killua.
31	"Disband × Party × Unpleasant Ties"; Transliteration: "Kaisan × Pāti × Kusare En" (Japanese: 解散×パーティ×くされ縁)	June 10, 2000
Gon is determined that Killua has left against his will and Gon is going to find him. He fights Illumi for information and Illumi is about to kill him when Hisoka shows up. Illumi instead tells Gon that Killua is at the Zoldyck family home. Leorio is about to go to medical school and Kurapika is about to leave on his first job when both change their minds and decide to follow Gon as he looks for Killua.
32	"Sightseeing × Landmark × Killua's House"; Transliteration: "Kankō × Meisho × Kiruanchi" (Japanese: 観光×名所×キルアんち)	June 17, 2000
Gon, Leorio and Kurapika take a train towards Killua's home on Kukuroo Mountain. The last leg of the trip is spent on a tour bus that takes them to the Door to Hades, a giant gate that hides the path to the estate. A beast named Mike waits behind the gate, so Gon asks the security guard, Zebro to call Killua and have him open it from the inside.
33	"Training × Hound × Exhausted"; Transliteration: "Tokkun × Ryōken × Batankyū" (Japanese: 特訓×猟犬×バタンキュー)	July 1, 2000
Gon, Leorio and Kurapika stay in the Zoldyck family's servants' quarters at the security guards behest. Zebro lets them in through the Testing Gate (weighing tons), and Gon feels he should have been able to let himself in. While they stay there, the guard trains them with weighted brooms, water buckets, slippers, cups and whatnot. They end up extremely strong. After 20 days they are able to open the gate themselves, and they start walking through the grounds towards the house. Gon and Kurapika can push the first gate of 2 tons open, and Leorio is strong enough for the second gate.
34	"Skateboard × Apprentice × Honesty"; Transliteration: "Sukebō × Minarai × Hontō no Kimochi" (Japanese: スケボー×見習い×本当の気持ち)	July 15, 2000
The group meets a butlers' apprentice while walking closer to their target. She has Killua's skateboard, and refuses to let them pass. Repeatedly Gon walks over a line she drew, and each time she sends him flying with her mace. Eventually, she explains that she is Canary, a servant of Killua. Canary tells her Killua gave the skateboard to her because they're friends, so she should let Killua's other friends pass. She lets them pass, but is immediately hit by an unknown projectile.
35	"Killua × Punishment × Family Meeting"; Transliteration: "Kirua × Oshioki × Kazoku Kaigi" (Japanese: キルア×おしおき×家族会議)	July 22, 2000
Killua's mother Kikyo and brother Kalluto knock Canary out. They tell Gon that Killua doesn't have time to see them and they should leave. When Canary wakes up, she and Gon's group head to the house of security guards. Meanwhile, Killua has a talk with his father Silva, who makes Killua promise to never betray his friends. He then lets Killua leave to find Gon. Later, Silva tells Kikyo that Killua will be back because he's his father's son.
36	"Coin Toss × Reunion × Change of Clothes"; Transliteration: "Koin × Saikai × Omeshikae" (Japanese: コイン×再会×おめしかえ)	August 8, 2000
Canary and Gon's group arrive at the Butlers' Quarters and are greeted by Gotoh, Zoldyck family manager. He plays a game with the group, with seemingly deadly stakes. It turns out this was just to entertain them until Killua arrives. He does, and they all leave. At the airport, the group splits up but they all agree to meet in six months in Yorknew City.

=== Heavens Arena arc ===
No.	Title	Original release date
37	"Heaven × Fight × Training"; Transliteration: "Tenkū × Faito × Mushashugyō" (Japanese: 天空×ファイト×武者修行)	August 19, 2000
Gon and Killua decide to fight professionally in order to train and make money. They go to the 251-story Heavens Arena, where every 10 floor increase represents more difficult opponents. Gon's power has increased dramatically from training on Zoldyck grounds, and he sends his opponent flying. Killua faces Zushi, another child who is competing, and Killua senses he can use a technique similar to Illumi's. Killua vows to meet Zushi on the top floor to learn more.
38	"Nen × Nen × Nen?"; Transliteration: "Nen × Nen × Nen?" (Japanese: 燃×念×ネン?)	September 9, 2000
Killua and Gon learn about Nen from Wing, Zushi's teacher. Nen involves using your body's aura while fighting. On their way to register for the fights on the 200th floor, they're stopped by Hisoka. He doesn't think they're ready to fight at a high level. He uses his Nen to block them, and they have 3 hours to learn enough Nen to get past him, or Killua can never fight in Heavens Arena again.
39	"Secret Trick × Register × The Battle Begins"; Transliteration: "Urawaza × Tōroku × Batoru Kaishi" (Japanese: 裏ワザ×登録×バトル開始)	September 16, 2000
Gon and Killua are able to make it past Hisoka's Ren and enter the fights on the 200th floor of Heavens Arena. Gon immediately wants to test his new powers and fights against a man who uses his Nen and toy tops as weapons. He initially beats up Gon, but Gon learns to use his Zetsu to sense the tops and avoid them.
40	"Two Months × Break × Just In Case"; Transliteration: "Nikkagetsu × Oyasumi × Nen ni wa Nen wo" (Japanese: 二ヶ月×お休み×念には念を)	September 23, 2000
Gon is finally healed as he and Killua continue working on their Nen. Kurapika is shown looking for work, and being turned down. The girl who would hire him tells him if he can't see something invisible in the room, then he's not ready for a job. Leorio is shown studying medicine and looking at a picture of him and the other examinees. Hisoka begins a match with Kastro.
41	"Bungee × Punch × One Round Battle"; Transliteration: "Banjī × Panchi × Ippanshōbu" (Japanese: バンジー×パンチ×一本勝負)	September 30, 2000
Gon and Killua learn their types of Hatsu; Gon is an Enhancer and Killua is a Transmuter. Gon fights Hisoka, and while over-matched, gets a punch in and gives back the number badge that Hisoka gave him during the exam. After that, Hisoka fights with his full power.
42	"Hisoka's Love × Showdown × Gon's Resolve"; Transliteration: "Hisoka no ai × Ketchaku × Gon no Honki" (Japanese: ヒソカの愛×決着×ゴンの本気)	October 21, 2000
Gon and Hisoka continue their fight. Hisoka has attached his "Bungee Gum" to Gon's face and can pull him in to punch him. The referee awards points fast, leading to the quick win for Hisoka. At the end Hisoka is shown to have some connection with Phantom Troupe; he has a spider tattoo on his back that he can remove. Machi tells them her boss won't be pleased if he doesn't make it to Phantom Troupe meeting.
43	"Talent × Agony × Killer Instinct"; Transliteration: "Sainō × Kunō × Koroshi no Honnō" (Japanese: 才能×苦悩×ころしの本能)	October 28, 2000
After Gon's match, Killua decides that he will compete as well, eager to test his own strength. Gido, Sadaro, and Riehlvelt kidnap Zushi to bribe Killua into forfeiting his matches with the three of them, so they can get easy wins. However, Killua makes sure that they will fight honestly and don't cheat. Sadaro withdraws due to his fear of Killua, who he says, "lived in the darkest corners of the world."
44	"Small Fry × Clean Up × Exam Over!?"; Transliteration: "Zako × Okatazuke × Shiken Shūryō!?" (Japanese: 雑魚×おかたずけ×試験終了!?)	November 4, 2000
Gon and Killua master their Nen abilities and show them in perfection against matches with the other two guys that Killua talked to. Wing talks with them and tells Gon that he has passed the Hunter's Exam. Lastly, Gon and Killua venture out to Whale Island.

=== Phantom Troupe arc ===
No.	Title	Original release date
45	"Limitation × Vow × Chain of Judgment"; Transliteration: "Seiyaku × Seiyaku × Imashime no Kusari" (Japanese: 制約×誓約×戒めの鎖)	November 11, 2000
Kurapika's flashbacks with his master are seen here. The flashbacks tell how Kurapika passed his hidden Hunter exam and got his chains, what Nen type he has, and how he's changed. After he got his first job, Kurapika gets on the train where he meets someone that might become a future ally.
46	"I'm Home × Welcome Back × I'm Killua"; Transliteration: "Tadaima × Okaeri × Boku Kirua" (Japanese: ただいま×おかえり×ぼくキルア)	November 18, 2000
Gon and Killua take a ship to get to Whale Island where Gon grew up. Killua is surprised that there is no bus and they have to walk, and that the house is really small. Mito, Gon's aunt, welcomes them and asks about the exam. When they go camping in the forest, they hear a shot and come running, seeing a bunch of poachers attacking the fox-bear and his cub. Easily beating them, they take the cub home. Gon wants to save him, but Killua insists on stopping his sufferings by killing him. Finally, they heal him with their Nen.
47	"Dad × Top Secret × Confession"; Transliteration: "Chichi × Maruhi × Kokuhaku" (Japanese: 父×マル秘×告白)	November 25, 2000
Gon and Killua try to repair an antenna and a computer to set up Internet. Mito tells Gon all she can about his father Ging and hands over a mysterious box Ging left. Gon manages to open the box with his Nen and finds a ring, a tape and some piece of electronic equipment there. He and Killua listen to the tape where Ging introduces himself and welcomes his son to find him if he can.
48	"Kurapika × Black Eyes × First Job"; Transliteration: "Kurapika × Kuroi Me × Saisho no Shigoto" (Japanese: クラピカ×黒い眼×最初の仕事)	December 2, 2000
Kurapika together with five other hunters comes for a job interview. They are given preliminary orders and tested by being attacked by a number of fighters in black. Kurapika quickly understands that it is actually a Nen-based ability of one of the imposters, and counter-attacks him directly. Gon stops his father's tape when Ging tells he recorded a voice of his mother. The tape then destroys itself. Killua explains that the ROM card they found in Ging's box is meant for Joystation video game console.
49	"Heart Tone × Kurapika × Dowsing"; Transliteration: "Shinon × Kurapika × Daujingu" (Japanese: 心音×クラピカ×ダウジング)	December 9, 2000
Gon and Killua order a Joystation and see that the card they have contains data for Greed Island game that cannot be found on Internet. Killua calls his brother who is a devoted gamer, but even he doesn't have that one (however, he provides some information in exchange for the data from Gon's ROM card). Back to Kurapika, they manage to identify two spies: Shachmono Tocino and Squala, who already work for the same boss and were asked to test the four rookies.
50	"Killua × Big Fortune × Hunter's Tavern"; Transliteration: "Kirua × Ikkaku Senkin × Hantā Saito" (Japanese: キルア×一攫千金×狩人の酒場(ハンターサイト))	December 16, 2000
Gon and Killua leave Mito and her mother to go to Yorknew. They got even more information about Greed Island from a website available only for hunters. They need a lot of money to buy it, even millions they earned at Heavens Arena are not enough. They try to earn more by getting bargains on-line, but fail miserably, cutting their funds to 10 million jenny. Milluki, Killua's brother, could not decode the game from the card data and goes to Yorknew to buy it too. Hisoka is also showing flying there. After all tests Kurapika got his job and is introduced to his boss who turns out to be a teenager named Neon Nostrade.
51	"Spider × Yorknew × Assemble"; Transliteration: "Kumo x Yōkushin x Zenin Shūgō" (Japanese: クモ×ヨークシン×全員集合)	December 23, 2000
Neon with all her bodyguards arrives at Yorknew. Her Nen ability is shown: Lovely Ghost Writer that predicts the future. Four members of Phantom Troupe are shown walking to Yorknew: Feitan, Machi, Franklin, and Nobunaga. The last two are having a quarrel. Gon wants to buy a mobile phone and is unexpectedly helped by an old friend, Leorio. Later he also helps to raise funds by allowing people to pay for arm wrestling with Gon who easily beats everyone and has some trouble defeating Shizuku.
52	"Underground Auction × Annihilation × Machinegun"; Transliteration: "Angura × Zenmetsu × Mashingan" (Japanese: 地下競売(アングラ)×全滅×マシンガン)	January 13, 2001
Chrollo Lucilfer, the boss of the Phantom Troupe, gives them orders to go to the underground auction and kill everyone there, and they proceed. Franklin uses a machine gun hidden in his fingers to fire Nen bullets, and Shizuku cleans up so that no traces of the massacre are left visible. Melody and Kurapika are talking more openly to each other while waiting on the roof. The mafia community sends the group of its best fighters called Shadow Beasts to deal with Phantom Troupe.
53	"Phantom Troupe × The Shadow Beasts × Community"; Transliteration: "Ryodan × Injū × Komyuniti" (Japanese: 旅団×陰獣×コミュニティ)	January 20, 2001
Mafia people attack Phantom Troupe, but in vain: they are not Nen users, and Uvogin is able to catch a bullet with his teeth and withstand a point blank shot from a bazooka. Four members of the Shadow Beasts arrive, they are noticeably stronger than Kurapika companions, but even they are defeated by just one Phantom Troupe member.
54	"Hisoka × Alliance × Spider Hunting"; Transliteration: "Hisoka × Dōmei × Kumo Taiji" (Japanese: ヒソカ×同盟×クモ退治)	January 27, 2001
Kurapika captures Uvogin with his chains and they quickly run away. Leaving him in hands of Dalzollene, the leader of Neon's bodyguards, Kurapika leaves to meet with Hisoka who promises to give some information on other members of Phantom Troupe. Dalzollene asks people from mafia community to come to pick up, but instead Phantom Troupe members arrive, killing him and freeing Uvogin. Leorio shows Gon and Killua his Ten and it turns out to be the only Nen technique he is aware of.
55	"Uvo × Kurapika × Melody of Determination"; Transliteration: "Ubō × Kurapika × Kakugo no Senritsu" (Japanese: ウボォー×クラピカ×覚悟の旋律)	February 3, 2001
Kurapika contacts his boss (Neon's father) and is told that he should be in charge after Dalzollene's death. Raging Uvogin searches for "the chain guy", and finds him alone with Neon and the others moved to another room. They decide to go out of the city to be able to fight with full strength. Leorio gets Gon's strength so popular with arm wrestling contest that they are invited to an underground auction where everyone is given pictures of the Phantom Troupe with a bounty of 2 billion jenny on each head.
56	"Scarlet Eyes × Duel × Cost of Life"; Transliteration: "Hi no Me × Kettō × Inochi no Daishō" (Japanese: 緋の眼×決闘×命の代償)	February 10, 2001
Killua remembers that his father once was paid to kill a Phantom Troupe member: he succeeded but said it was too hard and advised his sons to stay away from them. Gon, Killua and Leorio spend four hours searching with no results, and Gon decides to get a loan of 100 million jenny for his Hunter License. Kurapika and Uvogin fight with the latter going from 20% of his strength to 50% and finally to 100%, yet Kurapika has the upper hand due to a deadly oath and finally kills him.
57	"Gon × Treasure × Dangerous Man"; Transliteration: "Gon × Otakara × Ayaui Otoko" (Japanese: ゴン×お宝×危うい男)	February 17, 2001
Leorio helps Gon to buy a complete catalogue to find Greed Island game there. To collect 8.9 billion they go to a flea market and use gyo to buy only items that have Nen aura on them. They make some money and befriend Zepile, a professional seller. Now they have money to pay for information, and Leorio calls them to tell that two Phantom Troupe members are located in the city.
58	"Gon × Killua × Deadly Chase"; Transliteration: "Gon × Kirua × Inochigake no Bikō" (Japanese: ゴン×キルア×命がけの尾行)	February 24, 2001
Gon, Killua and Leorio arrive at a place where Nobunaga and Machi pretend to be a couple sitting in a cafe, but they do not attack understanding that they are not strong enough. Leorio, who is unable to use Zetsu to hide his aura, returns home, but Gon and Killua try to follow them and are captured instead. Light Nostrade arrives, giving orders to Neon, Kurapika and others. Mafia hires several professional assassins, including Silva and Zeno from the Zoldyck family.
59	"Nest of Spiders × Captive × Killing Technique"; Transliteration: "Kumo no Su × Toraware × Koroshi Waza" (Japanese: 蜘蛛の巣×とらわれ×殺し技)	March 3, 2001
Gon and Killua are questioned about the "chain dude" but cannot give any answer, being unaware that he is Kurapika. Gon and Nobunaga are armwrestling, and the latter cries, mourning the loss of Uvogin. Finally Nobunaga asks Gon to join Phantom Troupe. He promptly refuses, but Nobunaga insists on keeping him until Chrollo arrives.
60	"Kurapika × Assassination Team × Zoldyck"; Transliteration: "Kurapika × Ansatsudan × Zorudikku" (Japanese: クラピカ×暗殺団×ゾルディック)	March 10, 2001
Gon and Killua escape from Nobunaga. Killua tells Gon about Kurapika being the "chain user", they try to call him but get no answer. Neon runs away and is found by Chrollo Lucilfer who pretends to be friendly to get her prophecy. He helps her to sneak into the auction, then hits her unexpectedly and tells the security to call emergency services.
61	"Spider Rendezvous × Zoldyck Family × Final Battle"; Transliteration: "Kumo Shūketsu × Zoru ke × Saishū Kessen no Toki" (Japanese: クモ集結×ゾル家×最終決戦の時)	March 17, 2001
Some assassins battle Chrollo but in vain. Mafia dons become impatient, and the Zoldycks calm them down. Zeno extends his En to 100 m radius, searching the building to find Chrollo. Other Phantom Troupe members advance, easily beating all the mafia forces. Kurapika notices Neon's pictures on the Internet (on a hunters-only website) and reports this to Light Nostrade, who also arrives at the auction.
62	"Kurapika × Friends × End of Spiders"; Transliteration: "Kurapika × Nakama × Kumo no Saigo" (Japanese: クラピカ×仲間×クモの最期)	March 31, 2001
Zeno and Silva defeat Chrollo, supposedly, but do not finish him off because of the call from Illumi who manages to kill the mafia dons. Having no client, the professional assassins have no reason to fight and just leave. Fake bodies of Chrollo and all other Phantom Troupe members are found, calming the mafia community, and the auction takes place as planned. Kurapika calms down a bit and meets with Gon, Killua and Leorio. In the last seconds of the episode, Hisoka sends a text message to Kurapika telling him the corpses are fake.
