= Billie Rogers =

American jazz musician and singer (1917–2014)

- Billie Rogers circa 1943

Background information
- Born: Zelda Louise Smith; May 31, 1917; North Plains, Oregon, U.S.
- Died: January 18, 2014 (aged 96)
- Genres: Jazz, swing, big band
- Occupations: Musician, bandleader
- Instrument: Trumpet
- Years active: 1927–1947
- Labels: Decca, MCA, V-Disc, Musicraft, Majestic

Billie Rogers (née Zelda Louise Smith) (May 31, 1917 – January 18, 2014) was an American jazz trumpeter and singer who was a member of Woody Herman's band from 1941 to 1943. She led her own band in 1943. At the end of that year, she joined Jerry Wald's band and remained a member until October 1945, when she left to form her own sextet.

Rogers is credited as the first woman to hold a horn position in a major jazz orchestra.

Woody Herman discovered Rogers in August 1941. After his band had finished for the evening at the Palladium Ballroom Cafe in Hollywood, Herman had gone to a small Los Angeles night club on the advice of his road manager where Rogers was singing and playing trumpet. Impressed, he asked for an introduction. Sammy Cahn, the songwriter, introduced them, and within a few minutes Herman hired her for his Blues on Parade band. She made her debut at the Panther Room of the Sherman Hotel in Chicago.

== Biography ==
=== Growing up ===
Rogers was born Zelda Louise Smith on May 31, 1917, in North Plains, Oregon. Her family moved to Rainier, Washington, before she was 2 and remained there until age 13. She attended elementary school and first year of high school at Rainier, a small rural community 17 miles inland from Olympia. She skipped two grades and graduated from high school at Renton, Washington, on the day after her 16th birthday.

She was raised in a family of musicians. Her father, William Cody Smith (1885–1970), played violin, alto sax, and banjo. Her mother, Bertha Emde (née Fleming; 1892–1976) played ragtime piano and accordion. Her older brother, Lester Smith (1913–1936), was proficient on sax. Her younger brother, Kenneth Gaylord Smith (1920–2005), played sax. She also had a younger sister, Alice V. (Mrs. Olaf Hemnes; 1924–1996).

=== Rainier, Washington ===
During the years in Rainier, the family formed a band called "Smith's Rainier Entertainers," composed of Billie's father, mother, her brother Les, herself, and a hired drummer. Billie played trumpet and sang through a megaphone.

She began studying piano at age 6. She also began playing trumpet when she was around 8, when her older brother, Les, decided he didn't care for that particular instrument. Les had learned to play several instruments by the time he graduated from the University of Montana in 1936, mainly piano, saxophone, clarinet and flute. Les was also a prolific arranger. He played baritone horn in the university marching band and was student director of the Missoula High School band. Over the years, her mother expanded her skills to playing organ, accordion, and double-bass; she learned soprano sax, but later had to make a decision as to which instrument to focus on. Trumpet prevailed.

Both she and her brother, Les, were born with perfect pitch, a fact that neither had realized until she was 8 and he was 12. They had both assumed that everyone heard music the way they did. Their parents were astounded and didn't even know what to call it.

Les began attending Washington State College at the age of 16, with a full scholarship. The depression hit and her parents had to bring him home. Les taught piano in Tacoma until he made connections with a local band in Missoula, Montana, and enrolled for his last two years of education at the University of Montana. Les died 3 months after graduation, in 1936, from a ruptured appendix, shortly before the discovery of sulfa and long before antibiotics. He had sent for his sister when she was 17. They shared an apartment and she played and sung in his band for the intervening years.

She stayed in Missoula until 1941, married Guy C. Rogers (1918–1996) and worked with local musicians. At that time the couple, who had not children, decided to divorce and she ended up in California at the request of some musician friends.

=== Woody Herman ===
When she transferred her union membership from Missoula to Los Angeles, Rogers was informed that she couldn't work a steady job for the first six months. However, since there was a shortage of female musicians, the union allowed her to work full-time if she worked with other women. She got a job with a quartet working in a bar in Culver City. They started with practically no business at all, but within a couple of weeks the place was packed every night and celebrities were dropping by. One evening Woody Herman's road manager, Jack Archer, stopped by and invited Rogers to audition for Herman, who offered her a job on the spot. She started out sitting in front of the band with the other girl singer, but eventually made her way to the trumpet section.

When she met Archer, he had recently received an honorable discharge from the U.S. Army (1943) and, that same year, had become the road manager of the Woody Herman Orchestra. Rogers stayed with Hermanfor more than two years; but traveling during the war years was difficult and demanding. While working with Herman, Archer and Rogers became engaged. She left the Herman band on October 27, 1943, and moved to Chicago, where she and Archer were married on April 21, 1944. Rogers then formed her own big band called the Billie Rogers Orchestra, which performed a couple of years on the east coast. Archer left Herman to manage Rogers' band, which he did from July 22, 1944, until the end of 1944, when the group disbanded. At the end of 1944, Rogers joined the Jerry Wald band and remained a member until October 1945, when she left to form her own sextet.

Rogers says that her most enjoyable gig was playing with the Tommy Pederson Band at the Hollywood Palladium on Monday nights, plus other miscellaneous gigs in Los Angeles area.

=== Jack Archer ===
Jack Archer built a career as a booking agent, initially for big bands in the one-nighter category, but eventually moving into R&B.

Overlapping with his responsibilities managing Rogers' orchestra, Jack was handling bookings for Mills Music, staying on until January 8, 1944, when he then became head of the one-night band department at General Amusement Corporation, a position he held until July 22, 1944.

When Billie Rogers' band broke up, Jack Archer went back to booking bands at Frederick Bros. Music Corporation (up until January 1946), then William Morris (February 1946 to 1947), where he replaced Billy Shaw. Then in August 1947, Archer left William Morris to form his own booking agency with Milt Deutsch and Abe Turchen. It was called "Continental Artists" and was based in Hollywood. Continental began handling the bookings of Woody Herman, Noro Morales, and Miguelito Valdes. Archer served as head of Continental and ran its Hollywood office while Deutsch ran its New York office at 1650 Broadway.

In 1949, Rogers and Archer had a daughter, Joan Denise Archer.

After Continental, Archer handled bookings for Federal Artists Agency before joining Shaw Artists Corporation in 1950 to head-up its one-night department. Shaw Artists was founded in 1949 by Billy Shaw. When Shaw died on June 23, 1956, Archer took over as vice president and general manager. On April 1, 1957, he then left to form his own booking agency called "Archer Associates", located on West 57th Street in New York City. He sold that firm in December 1957 to Associated Booking Corporation (also known as ABC), a firm headed by Joe Glaser. Archer stayed on to focus on developing a strong R&B line-up, which included the Platters, Dinah Washington, and the Drifters. Archer suffered a slight heart attack in April 1958. He died in 1962.

Their daughter, now known as Denise "Dee" Archer, is an R&B singer, keyboard player, and guitarist, who also is a senior executive with a wireless telecommunications company.

I never ran across any good girl musicians.

— Billie Rogers
declaring "Women musicians" to be her pet peeve (1942)

== Selected discography ==
As sideman

With the Woody Herman Orchestra
- Chicago, November 13, 1941, OCLC 176987734; OCLC 31695596 (side B); OCLC 228098606 (side B); OCLC 180203428 (side B)
- New York, December 18, 1941 OCLC 180033430 (side B)
- New York, January 28, 1942, OCLC 31695596 (side A); OCLC 180203428 (side A); OCLC 180033430 (side A)
- New York, April 2, 1942, OCLC 191058596 (side B)
- New York, April 23, 1942, OCLC 191058596 (side A)
- Los Angeles, July 24, 1942, OCLC 31793003 (side A)
- Los Angeles, July 29, 1942, OCLC 191799648 (side A)
- Los Angeles, July 31, 1942 OCLC 191671290
- Film Soundtrack, Hollywood, CA, February–April 1943, February 1, 1943, Wintertime (1943 film) OCLC 30480766; ISBN 0793985560; ISBN 9780793985562
- Recorded between February & June 1943, OCLC 40494611
- Los Angeles, late spring 1943, AFRS Command Performance
- Los Angeles, June 1943 broadcast, The Fitch Bandwagon

As leader

The Billie Rogers Orchestra
- Women's Lib In 1944: One Night Stand With Billie Rogers, AFRS One Night Stand No. 368, Pelham Heath Inn, The Bronx, New York, August 20, 1944 OCLC 24734694

Billie Rogers (trumpet, vocal), Dick Getz, Johnny Mandel, Bobby Guyer (Robert S. Guyer; 1916–1988) (trumpet), Jim Feak (James Joseph Feak, Jr.; 1926–2009), Page Palmer, Paul R. O'Connor (born 1926) (trombone), John Stonebreaker, Charles Chadwick (alto sax) Gene Prieser, Jim Ligons (tenor sax), Bill Wyman (baritone sax) unknown (piano), Harry Babasin, (bass), Roy S. Harte (drums)
1. Blue Moon
2. How deep is the ocean? Billy Rogers, vocal
3. How many hearts have you broken?, Billy Rogers, vocal
4. Just close your eyes, Billy Rogers, vocal
5. I've got you under my skin
6. If I knew then, Billy Rogers, vocal
7. Perdido
8. Is you is or is you ain't my baby, Billy Rogers, vocal
9. An hour never passes, Billy Rogers, vocal
10. Pelham panic

- New York, December 1944

Billie Rogers (trumpet, vocal), Dick Getz, Johnny Mandel (trumpet), Mort Gellett, George Kraft, Paul R. O'Connor (born 1926) (trombone), Stuart Anderson, Charles Chadwick, Jay Ligion, Irv Stonebraker, Bob Whyman (saxes), Harry Biss (piano), Harry Babasin, (bass), Roy Harte (drums), Tony Dexter (vocal), Ray Conniff (arranger)

5230 Rogers corners, Ray Conniff, arranger; Musicraft 15028; OCLC 77894444 (side 1)
5231 I didn't know about you, Billie Rogers, vocal; Musicraft 15027; OCLC 84228165 (side 1)
5232 How deep is the ocean?, Billie Rogers, vocal; Musicraft 15028; OCLC 80419134 (side 1)
5233 You're so sweet to remember, Tony Dexter, vocal; Musicraft 15027; OCLC 78079296 (side 1)

As sideman

With the Jerry Wald Orchestra
- New York, February 1945
- New York, February 1945

T514 Clarinet boogie blues, Billie Rogers, vocal OCLC 83247157

- New York, March 1945

With the Tommy Pederson
- Los Angeles, circa late January 1947 OCLC 661979105
