= The Jive Bombers =

American R&B group (1950s)

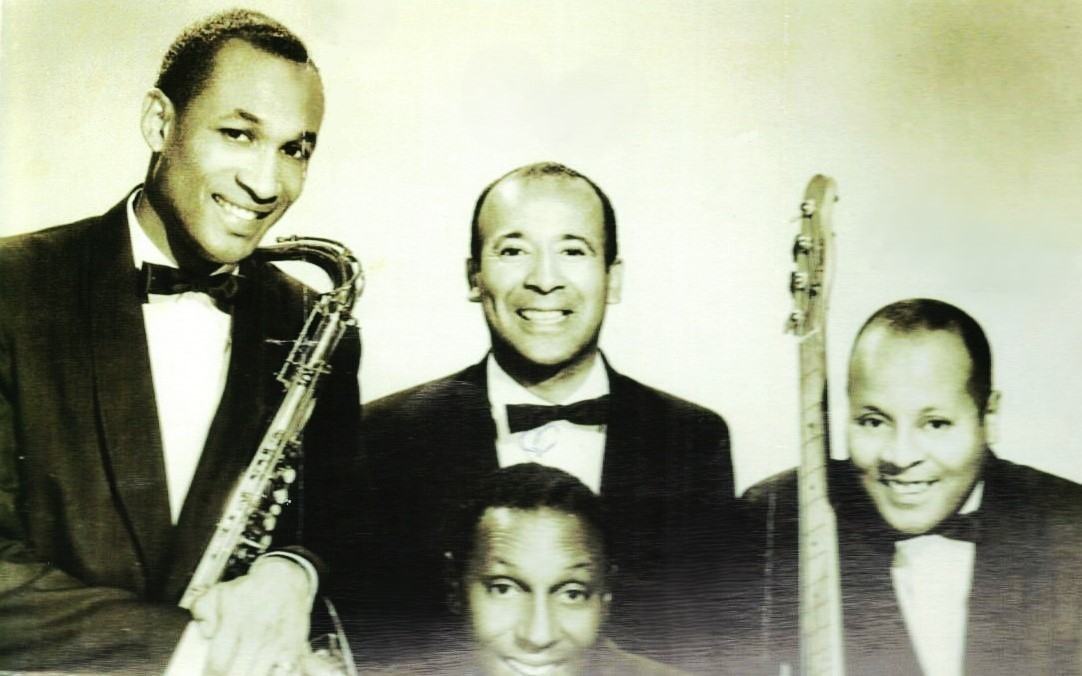
- The Jive Bombers – from left: Earl Johnson, Al Tinney (standing), Clarence Palmer and William "Pee Wee" Tinney

Background information
- Origin: New York City, U.S.
- Genres: R&B
- Labels: Citation Records; Savoy
- Members: Earl Johnson; Al Tinney; William "Pee Wee" Tinney; Clarence Palmer

The Jive Bombers were an American R&B group from New York City.

== History ==
The Jive Bombers consisted of members of two previous vocal groups, Sonny Austin & the Jive Bombers, and the Palmer Brothers. They first recorded under the name the Sparrows in 1949 for Coral Records, and changed their name to the Jive Bombers in 1952 to record for Citation Records. Their 1957 Savoy Records single "Bad Boy", co-written by Avon Long and Lil Hardin, was a hit in the U.S., peaking at No. 7 on the R&B singles chart and No. 36 on the Billboard Hot 100. The song has since been covered by the Escorts, Mink DeVille, Ringo Starr, Buster Poindexter (a.k.a. David Johansen), Sha Na Na, and others, and was used in the 1990 film Cry-Baby.

What distinguishes the Jive Bombers from similar bands of the same era, was the unique and often downright bizarre vocal style of lead singer Clarence Palmer. Apart from his powerful normal singing style, he would frequently scat-sing an indescribable "UAH-UAH-UAH" sound at the end of certain words or lines. In "Bad Boy", he uses this effect every time he sings the song's title.

== Members ==
- Earl Johnson (November 30, 1932)
- Al Tinney (May 28, 1921 – December 11, 2002)
- William "Pee Wee" Tinney (September 25, 1930)
- Clarence Palmer (January 2, 1911, Pawtucket, Rhode Island – March 1978, The Bronx, New York City)
