= Terry Gibbs Plays Jewish Melodies in Jazztime =

Studio album by Terry Gibbs
- Released: 1963
- Recorded: 1963
- Genre: Jazz
- Length: 52:30
- Label: Mercury
- Producer: Quincy Jones

Terry Gibbs chronology
Hootenanny My Way (1963)	Terry Gibbs Plays Jewish Melodies in Jazztime (1963)	Explosion (1963)

Professional ratings
Review scores
Source	Rating
Allmusic	3/5 stars

Terry Gibbs Plays Jewish Melodies in Jazztime is a 1963 studio album by Terry Gibbs. Verve remastered it in 24 bits/96Hz in 2002 for the mini-lp cd.

It is the debut recording of Alice Coltrane, credited as Alice McLeod or Alice Hagood.

== Track listing ==
1. "Bei Mir Bist du Schön" (Sammy Cahn, Saul Chaplin, Jacob Jacobs, Sholom Secunda) – 5:01
2. "Papirossen (Cigarettes)" (Herman Yablokoff) – 4:24
3. "Kazochok (Russian Dance)" (Traditional) – 2:50
4. "Vuloch (A Folk Dance)" (Traditional) – 3:59
5. "My Yiddish Momme" (Lew Pollack, Jack Yellen) – 3:04
6. "And the Angels Sing" (Ziggy Elman, Johnny Mercer) – 2:44
7. "S & S" (Terry Gibbs) – 4:34
8. "Shaine une Zees (Pretty & Sweet)" (Gibbs) – 6:26
9. "Nyah Shere (New Dance)" (Traditional) – 4:11

Recorded 1963 at A&R Recording, New York City: tracks 2, 5, 6, and 8 on January 11 or 12; tracks 1, 3, 4, 7, and 9 on January 12 or March 11.

== Personnel ==
- Terry Gibbs - marimba, vibraphone
- Alice McLeod - piano
- Herman Wright - double bass
- Al Logan - piano
- Ray Musiker - clarinet
- Sol Gage - drums
- Sam Kutcher - trombone
