= Bopstacle Course =

Studio album by Terry Gibbs
- Released: 1974
- Genre: Jazz
- Label: Xanadu

Professional ratings
Review scores
| Source | Rating |
|---|---|
| Allmusic | link |

Bopstacle Course is a jazz album by vibraphonist Terry Gibbs, recorded in 1974 for Xanadu Records.

== Track listing ==
1. "Bopstacle Course" (Gibbs) - 4:39
2. "Body and Soul" (Eyton, Green, Heyman, Sour) - 7:06
3. "Waltz For My Children" (Gibbs) - 4:42
4. "Softly, As in a Morning Sunrise" (Hammerstein, Romberg) - 6:04
5. "Manha de Carnaval" (Bonfa, Maria) - 4:48
6. "Do You Mind?" (Gibbs) - 5:03
7. "Kathleen" (Gibbs) - 4:08
8. "I'm Getting Sentimental over You" (Bassman, Washington) - 6:41

== Personnel ==
- Terry Gibbs - vibes
- Barry Harris - piano
- Sam Jones - bass guitar
- Alan Dawson - drums
