= Lil Hardin Armstrong =

American jazz musician and bandleader (1898–1971)

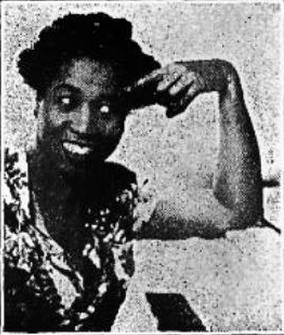
- Armstrong in 1935

Background information
- Born: Lillian Hardin; February 3, 1898; Memphis, Tennessee, U.S.
- Died: August 27, 1971 (aged 73) Chicago, Illinois, U.S.
- Genre: Jazz
- Occupations: Musician; composer; bandleader; singer
- Instruments: Piano, vocals
- Spouse: Louis Armstrong (m. 1924; div. 1938)

Lillian Hardin Armstrong (née Hardin; February 3, 1898 – August 27, 1971) was an American jazz pianist, composer, arranger, singer, and bandleader. She was the second wife of Louis Armstrong, with whom she collaborated on many recordings in the 1920s.

Her compositions include "Struttin' with Some Barbecue", "Don't Jive Me", "Two Deuces", "Knee Drops", "Doin' the Suzie-Q", "Just for a Thrill" (which was a hit when revived by Ray Charles in 1959), "Clip Joint", and "Bad Boy" (a hit for the Jive Bombers in 1957). Armstrong was inducted into the Memphis Music Hall of Fame in 2014.

== Background ==
Lil's grandmother, Priscilla Martin, was a former slave from near Oxford, Mississippi. Martin had a son and three daughters, one of whom was Dempsey, Lil's mother. Priscilla Martin moved her family to Memphis to escape from her husband, a trek the family made by mule-drawn wagon. Dempsey married Will Hardin, and Lillian Hardin was born on February 3, 1898. She grew up in a household with her grandmother. Will died when Lil was seven. Dempsey later remarried to John Miller.

During her early years, Hardin was taught hymns, spirituals, and classical music on the piano. She was drawn to popular music and later blues.

== Early education and mentors ==
Hardin first received piano instruction from her third-grade teacher, Violet White. Her mother then enrolled her in Mrs. Hook's School of Music. At Fisk University, a college for African Americans in Nashville, she received more advanced training, and earning a diploma from Fisk, returned to Memphis in 1917. In August 1918, she moved to Chicago with her mother and stepfather. By then she had become a proficient sight-reader, a skill that helped her gain a job as a sheet music demonstrator at Jones Music Store.

The store paid Hardin $3 a week ($61 in 2023 dollars), but bandleader Lawrence Duhé offered $22.50 ($458 in 2023 dollars). Knowing that her mother would disapprove of her working in a cabaret, she made it known that her new job was playing for a dancing school. As observed by Thomas Brothers, the discrepancies between her education and that of Duhé's band members were apparent; when she asked what key the New Orleanians were going to play in, they remarked, "We don't know what key. When you hear two knocks start playing." Three weeks later the band moved to a better booking at the De Luxe Café, where the entertainers included Florence Mills and Cora Green. From there, the band moved up to Dreamland. Here the principal entertainers were Alberta Hunter and Ollie Powers. When King Oliver's Creole Jazz Band replaced Duhé's group at Dreamland, Oliver asked Hardin to stay with him. She was with Oliver at Dreamland in 1921 when an offer came for the orchestra to play a six-month engagement at the Pergola Ballroom in San Francisco. At the end of that booking Hardin returned to Chicago while the rest of the Oliver band went to Los Angeles. She later studied at the New York College of Music, where she earned a post-graduate diploma in 1929.

== Marriages and divorces ==
In Chicago, Hardin returned to work at Dreamland as a pianist in an orchestra for Mae Brady, a violinist and vaudeville stalwart. While there, she fell for Jimmie Johnson, a young singer from Washington, D.C., whom she married on August 22, 1922. The marriage was short-lived, ending in divorce. The King Oliver's band returned from California and opened at the Royal Gardens with Bertha Gonsoulin at the piano but soon found itself back at Dreamland with Hardin at the piano.

King Oliver's band was enjoying enormous success at Dreamland when he sent for Louis Armstrong to join as second cornetist. Armstrong was beginning to make a name for himself in New Orleans and regarded Oliver ("Papa Joe") as his mentor. At first, Hardin was unimpressed, remembering that she "was very disgusted" by Louis, who arrived in Chicago wearing clothes and a hair style that she deemed to be "too country" for Chicago, but she worked to "take the country out of him", and a romance developed (to the surprise of other band members, some of whom had been trying to woo her for some time with no success). They would visit cabarets and after-hour spots after their job at Lincoln Gardens, but their relationship was solidified after Armstrong's mother's intervention in 1923, when she visited Armstrong in Chicago. Hardin and Armstrong needed to be divorced from their previous relationships (Lil Hardin to Jimmie Johnson, Louis Armstrong to Daisy Parker) and "claimed desertion" from said relationships to annul the marriages. Hardin and Armstrong were married on February 5, 1924, and honeymooned/toured with the Oliver band in Biglerville, Pennsylvania. The Defender noted that Hardin was dressed in a "Parisian gown of white crepe elaborately beaded in rhinestones and silver beads."

Hardin took Armstrong shopping and taught him how to dress more fashionably to her taste. She got rid of his bangs and began working to foster his career. In addition to updating his appearance, Hardin assisted Armstrong in learning classical music with the help of a German teacher in Chicago. She felt he was wasting his talent in a secondary role. Armstrong was happy to be playing next to his idol, but Hardin at first persuaded him to manage his own money and assert himself on the bandstand and during recording sessions; eventually, she convinced him to leave Oliver and go out on his own. Armstrong resigned from Oliver's band and in September 1924 accepted a job with bandleader Fletcher Henderson in New York City. Hardin stayed in Chicago, first with Oliver, then leading a band of her own. When Hardin's band got a job at the Dreamland Café in Chicago she prepared for Armstrong's return to Chicago by having a huge banner that read "The World's Greatest Trumpet Player".

Richard M. Jones convinced Okeh Records to make a series of sessions under his name: the Armstrong "Hot Five" recordings. With Hardin at the piano, Kid Ory on trombone, Johnny Dodds on clarinet, and Johnny St. Cyr on banjo, this group rehearsed at Armstrong and Hardin's residence on Chicago's East 41st Street and held its first session on November 15, 1925.

In the late 1920s, Hardin and Armstrong grew apart due to class differences and money issues. He formed a new Hot Five with Earl Hines on piano. Hardin reformed her own band with Freddie Keppard, whom she considered second only to Armstrong. Hardin and Armstrong separated in 1931 when he had a liaison with Alpha Smith, who threatened to sue Armstrong for breach of promise, so he begged Hardin not to grant him a divorce. They finally divorced in 1938.

== Later years ==
In the 1930s, sometimes billing herself as "Mrs. Louis Armstrong", Hardin led an "All Girl Orchestra", a mixed-sex big band which broadcast nationally over the NBC radio network. In the same decade she recorded for Decca as a swing vocalist and performed as piano accompanist for other singers. She also performed with Red Allen.

== Solo work ==
In the late 1940s and early 1950s, Hardin worked mostly as a soloist, singing and playing piano. In the late 1940s, she decided to leave the music business and become a tailor, so she took a course in tailoring. Her graduation project was to make a tuxedo for Armstrong.

Hardin returned to Chicago and the house on East 41st Street. She made a trip to Europe and had a brief love affair in France, but mostly she worked around Chicago, often with fellow Chicagoans. Collaborators included Red Saunders, Joe Williams, Oscar Brown Jr., and Little Brother Montgomery.

In the 1950s, Hardin recorded a biographical narrative for Bill Grauer at Riverside Records that was issued in LP form. She would again appear on that label in 1961, participating in its project Chicago: The Living Legends as accompanist for Alberta Hunter and leader of her own hastily assembled big band. The Riverside recordings led to her inclusion in a 1961 NBC network special, Chicago and All That Jazz, and a follow-up album released by Verve. In 1962, she began writing her autobiography with Chris Albertson, but she changed her mind when she realized the book would include experiences that might discomfit Louis Armstrong, so the project was delayed until his death. She died before finishing the book.

== Death ==
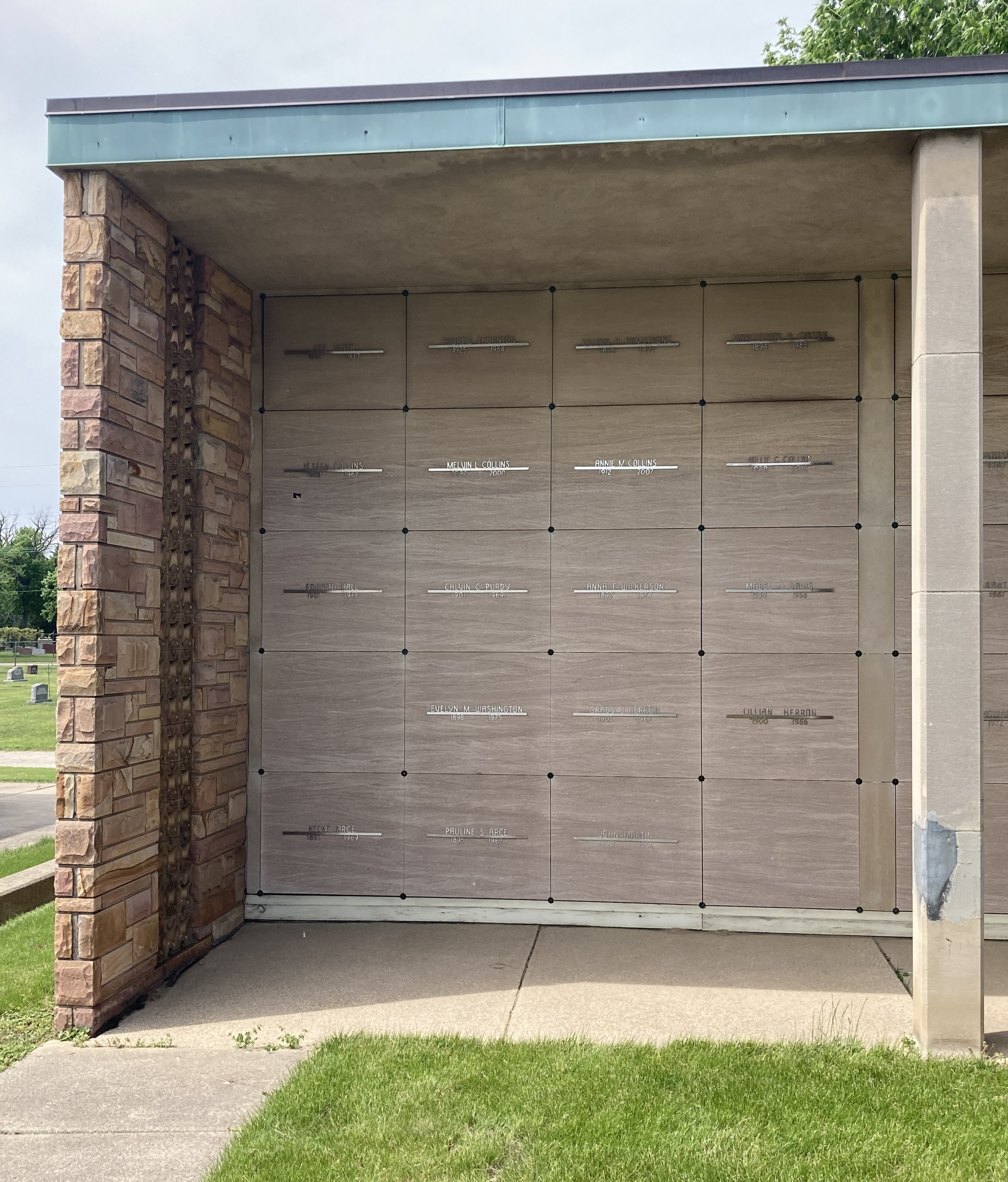
Armstrong's grave (top row, third from left) at Lincoln Cemetery

When Louis Armstrong died in 1971, she traveled to New York for the funeral and rode in the family car. Returning to Chicago, she felt that work on her autobiography could continue, but the following month, performing at a televised memorial concert for Armstrong, she collapsed at the piano and died from a heart attack on the way to the hospital. After her funeral, her letters and the unfinished manuscript of her autobiography disappeared from her house.

She was interred at Lincoln Cemetery in Blue Island, Illinois.

In 2004, the Chicago Park District renamed a community park in her honor.

== Legacy ==
Hardin's song "Bad Boy" (originally titled "Brown Gal") was covered by the Jive Bombers (first in 1950 as "Brown Boy") whose 1956 version was a hit, and by Ringo Starr in 1978 on his seventh album Bad Boy.

Her composition "Oriental Swing" was sampled by electro swing musician Parov Stelar to create the 2012 song "Booty Swing". The song gained notoriety when it was used in a 2013 Chevrolet commercial.
