= Rainbow Mist =

Compilation album by Coleman Hawkins
- Released: 1992
- Recorded: February 16 & 22 and May 17 & 22, 1944
- Studio: New York City
- Genre: Jazz
- Length: 43:52
- Label: Delmark; DD-459
- Producer: Robert G. Koester, Steve Wagner

Rainbow Mist is an album by the American jazz saxophonist Coleman Hawkins compiling recordings from 1944 originally released by Apollo Records that was released by the Delmark label in 1992.

== Reception ==
Professional ratings
Review scores
Source	Rating
Allmusic	5/5 stars
The Penguin Guide to Jazz Recordings	3.5/4 stars

Allmusic reviewer Scott Yanow stated "For his recording session of February 16, 1944, the great tenor invited some of the most promising younger players (including trumpeter Dizzy Gillespie, bassist Oscar Pettiford, and drummer Max Roach) and the result was the very first bebop on records. ... Also on this highly recommended CD are four titles matching together the tenors of Hawkins, Ben Webster, and Georgie Auld (with trumpeter Charlie Shavers included as a bonus) and a session from Auld's big band, highlighted by Sonny Berman's trumpet solo".

== Track listing ==
1. "Rainbow Mist" (Coleman Hawkins) – 2:55
2. "Woody 'n' You" (Dizzy Gillespie) – 2:57
3. "Bu-Dee-Daht" (Budd Johnson, Charlie Hart) – 3:10
4. "Disorder at the Border" (Hawkins) – 2:54
5. "Yesterdays" (Jerome Kern, Otto Harbach) – 2:53
6. "Feeling Zero" (Hawkins) – 2:55
7. "Salt Peanuts" (Gillespie, Kenny Clarke) – 2:53
8. "Uptown Lullaby" (Leonard Feather) – 3:17
9. "Pick-Up Boys" (Feather) – 2:59
10. "Porgy" (Jimmy McHugh, Dorothy Fields) – 3:00
11. "Concerto for Tenor" (Johnson) – 3:13
12. "Taps Miller" (Count Basie) – 3:08
13. "I Can't Get Started" (Vernon Duke, Ira Gershwin) – 4:30
14. "Sweet and Lovely" (Gus Arnheim, Jules LeMare, Harry Tobias) – 3:08

== Personnel ==
- Coleman Hawkins - tenor saxophone (tracks 1–10)

Tracks 1–6: Coleman Hawkins & His Orchestra:

- Dizzy Gillespie, Ed Vandever Vic Coulson – trumpet
- Leo Parker, Leonard Lowry – alto saxophone
- Don Byas, Ray Abrams – tenor saxophone
- Budd Johnson – tenor saxophone, baritone saxophone
- Clyde Hart – piano
- Oscar Pettiford – bass
- Max Roach – drums

Recorded in New York City on February 16, 1944 (tracks 2, 3 & 5) and February 22, 1944 (tracks 1, 4 & 6)

Tracks 7–10: Auld/Hawkins/Webster Sextet:

- Charlie Shavers – trumpet
- Georgie Auld – alto saxophone, soprano saxophone, tenor saxophone
- Ben Webster – tenor saxophone, clarinet
- Bill Rowland – piano
- Hy White – guitar
- Israel Crosby – bass
- Specs Powell – drums

Recorded in New York City on May 17, 1944

Tracks 11–14: Georgie Auld and His Orchestra:

- Georgie Auld – alto saxophone, soprano saxophone, tenor saxophone
- Sonny Berman, Manny Fox, Howard McGhee, George Schwartz – trumpet
- Bobby Lord, Rudy De Luca, Jerry Dorn – trombone
- Musky Ruffo, Gene Zanoni – alto saxophone
- Al Cohn, Irv Roth – tenor saxophone
- Irv Green – baritone saxophone
- Harry Biss – piano
- Morris Rayman – bass
- Lou Fromm – drums
- Kay Little – vocals (track 14)

Recorded in New York City on May 22, 1944
