= Clark Monroe's Uptown House =

Nightclub in New York City (1930s–1940s)

- Address: 198 West 134th St. (1930s); 52nd Street (1943); New York City; United States
- Owner: Clark Monroe
- Type: Nightclub

Construction
- Years active: 1930s–1940s

Clark Monroe's Uptown House, sometimes shortened to Monroe's Uptown House or simply Monroe's, was a nightclub in New York City. Along with Minton's Playhouse, it was one of the two principal jazz clubs in the early history of bebop.

== History ==
Clark Monroe opened the Uptown House in the 1930s at 198 West 134th Street in Harlem, in a building which formerly held Barron's Club (where Duke Ellington worked early in the 1920s) and the Theatrical Grill. From the late 1930s, the club presented swing jazz; Billie Holiday held a residence there for three months in 1937. In the early 1940s, the club became known for its jam sessions, where many of the players involved in the birth of bebop played together. Al Tinney led Monroe's house band, which included Max Roach, Benny Harris, George Treadwell, and Victor Coulsen. Charlie Parker was a featured soloist at the club in 1943.

An important live recording of Charlie Christian features a jam "session at Monroe's".

Monroe moved the club to 52nd Street in 1943, and opened a second club, The Spotlite, in December 1944.

== See also ==
- List of jazz clubs
