= Musicraft Records =

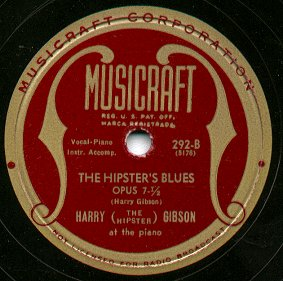
- Founded: 1937
- Genre: Jazz, classical
- Country of origin: U.S.
- Location: New York City

Musicraft Records was a record company and label established in 1937 in New York City.

== Catalogue ==
Musicraft's catalog encompassed many different musical styles, including classical music, folk, jazz, Latin, popular vocal, and calypso.

Artists who recorded for Musicraft include singer Mel Torme, vocalist Sarah Vaughan, vocalist Mindy Carson, Duke Ellington, bebop comic Harry "the Hipster" Gibson, pianist Teddy Wilson, blues pioneer Lead Belly, poet Carl Sandburg, Dizzy Gillespie, Georgie Auld, Artie Shaw, Buddy Greco, Billie Rogers, and others. Jazz accordionist Art Van Damme made his first recordings for the label.

According to the New York Public Library, the first original cast album, a set of songs recorded by the cast of The Cradle Will Rock, by Marc Blitzstein, was released in 1938 on Musicraft.

Composer/musician Walter Gross was an A&R executive and arranger for the label in the late 1940s. International music entrepreneur Peter Fritsch was an executive for Musicraft in the late 1940s before leaving to found Lyrichord Discs.

After Musicraft's demise, jazz authority and promoter Albert Marx acquired the label's catalog and reissued many titles on his Discovery Records label.

== See also ==
- List of record labels
