= Dero =

Dero may refer to:

- Dero (annelid), a genus of annelids in the family Naididae
- Dero Goi (born 1970), German musician
- Dero, "detrimental robots" in the writing of Richard Sharpe Shaver
- Dero (mythology), one of the Nereids in Greek mythology
- Dero, a Romanian brand of detergents
- DeRo, the pairing of Deniz and Roman on the German soap opera Alles was zählt
- Dero!, a Japanese game show that formed the basis for Syfy's game show Exit
- Dwayne De Rosario, Canadian soccer player, nicknamed DeRo
  - DeRo United Futbol Academy, Canadian soccer club founded by the above player

== See also ==
- Derro (disambiguation)
