= Take It from Me (album) =

Studio album by Terry Gibbs
- Released: 1964
- Recorded: January 16, 1964
- Genre: Jazz
- Length: 31:43
- Label: Impulse!

Terry Gibbs chronology
Hootenanny My Way (1963)	Take It from Me (1964)	Latino (1964)

Take It from Me is an album by American jazz vibraphonist Terry Gibbs featuring performances recorded in 1964 for the Impulse! label.

== Reception ==
The Allmusic review by Scott Yanow awarded the album 3 stars stating "This is a likable small-group date".

Professional ratings
Review scores
Source	Rating
Allmusic	3/5 stars

== Track listing ==
All compositions by Terry Gibbs except as indicated

1. "Take It from Me" - 4:21
2. "El Fatso" - 3:56
3. "Oge" - 3:11
4. "Pauline's Place" - 2:30
5. "8 LBS., 10 OZS." - 2:30
6. "Gee, Dad, It's A Degan" - 6:14
7. "All The Things You Are" (Jerome Kern, Oscar Hammerstein II) - 4:21
8. "Honeysuckle Rose (Fats Waller, Andy Razaf) - 4:40

- Recorded at Rudy Van Gelder Studio in Englewood Cliffs, New Jersey on January 16, 1964

== Personnel ==
- Terry Gibbs – vibes
- Kenny Burrell – guitar
- Sam Jones – bass
- Louis Hayes – drums
