= Harry Biss =

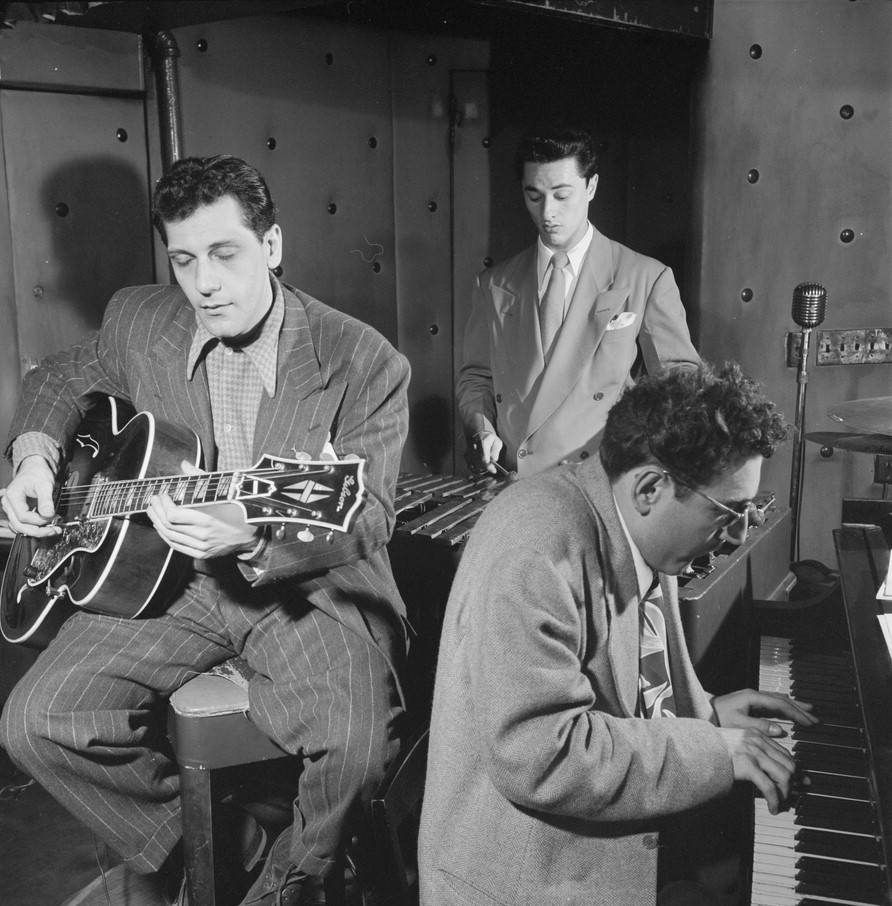
- Bill DeArango, Terry Gibbs, and Harry Biss, "Three Deuces", New York City, June 1947, photo: William P. Gottlieb

Background information
- Born: August 9, 1919; New York City
- Died: May 17, 1997
- Genre: Jazz
- Occupation: Musician
- Instrument: Piano
- Years active: 1934–1952

Harry Biss (9 August 1919, New York City – 17 May 1997, Long Beach, New York) was an American jazz pianist who flourished from 1944 to 1952.

He performed and recorded with Georgie Auld, Billie Rogers, George Shaw, Herbie Fields, Buddy Rich, Brew Moore, Gene Roland, Zoot Sims, Terry Gibbs, Allen Eager, and Eddie Bert.

== Discography ==
- Georgie Auld, Handicap (Musicraft, 1990)
- Coleman Hawkins, Rainbow Mist (Delmark, 1992)
- Zoot Sims, Quartets (Prestige, 1956)
- Cal Tjader, Terry Gibbs, Good Vibes (Savoy, 1989)
