= Bad Boy (The Jive Bombers song) =

"Brown Boy"

Single by Al Sears and the Sparrows
- B-side: "Shake Hands"
- Released: 1950
- Studio: Coral
- Songwriters: Lil Armstrong, Avon Long (credited to Clarence Palmer)

"Bad Boy"

Single by The Jive Bombers
- B-side: "When Your Hair Has Turned to Silver"
- Released: December 1956
- Studio: Savoy
- Genre: Doo-wop, R&B
- Length: 2:52
- Label: Savoy
- Songwriters: Lil Armstrong, Avon Long

"Bad Boy" is a song written by Lil Armstrong and Avon Long. It became a hit for the Jive Bombers in 1957. Armstrong originally wrote the song titled as "Brown Gal" and recorded it for Decca Records in 1936, having been covered by several artists since, including the Ink Spots in 1938, and Bennie Calloway with the 4 Steps of Jive in 1948.

== The Jive Bombers version ==
Clarence Palmer, lead singer of the Jive Bombers, recorded a version of Lil Armstrong's "Brown Gal" in December 1949, retitled as "Brown Boy" on Decca's Coral subsidiary, billed as Al Sears and the Sparrows and released in February 1950. They later re-recorded the song in 1952 billed as Clarence Palmer and the Jive Bombers on the Citation label. A second re-recording as simply the Jive Bombers was released in December 1956, retitled as "Bad Boy". This version was a hit on the Billboard charts and their only charting single, peaking at No. 36 on the Hot 100 and No. 7 on the R&B chart in March 1957.

== Other versions ==
"Bad Boy" has since been covered by the Escorts, Mink DeVille, Ringo Starr, Sha Na Na, Maryann Price, David Johansen performing as Buster Poindexter, and others, and was used in the first-season finale of the television show Crime Story as well as in the 1990 film Cry-Baby.

The Mink DeVille version was included in the 1983 film Breathless.
