= Hunter × Hunter (1999 TV series) =

1999 Japanese anime television series

- Type: TV series
- Based on: Hunter × Hunter
- Created by: Yoshihiro Togashi
- Directed by: Kazuhiro Furuhashi
- Character designer: Takayuki Gotō
- Music by: Toshihiko Sahashi
- No. of episodes: 62 (list of episodes)

Production
- Art director: Nobuto Sakamoto
- Sound director: Takuya Hiramitsu
- Cinematographers: Hidetoshi Watanabe; Seiichi Morishita
- Color designer: Mari Miyashita
- Editors: Taeko Hamauzu; Kazuho Nakano; Shinichi Natori
- Studio: Nippon Animation
- Producers: Shunichi Kosao; Keiichi Matsuda; Daisuke Kawakami
- Production companies: Fuji Television; Nippon Animation
- Runtime: 23 minutes

Original release
- Network: FNS (Fuji TV)
- Release: October 16, 1999 – March 31, 2001

Related
- Original video animation

Hunter × Hunter OVA
- Directed by: Satoshi Saga (1–8); Yukihiro Matsushita (9–16); Takeshi Hirota (17–30)
- Written by: Nobuaki Kishima
- Music by: Toshihiko Sahashi
- Studio: Nippon Animation
- Released: January 17, 2002 – August 18, 2004
- Episodes: 30

Hunter × Hunter is a Japanese anime television series based on Yoshihiro Togashi's manga series Hunter × Hunter. It was produced by Nippon Animation and broadcast for 62 episodes on Fuji TV from October 1999 to March 2001. The story focuses on a young boy named Gon Freecss, who one day discovers that the father he was told was dead, is in fact alive and well. He learns that his father, Ging, is a famous "Hunter": an individual who has proven themself an elite member of humanity. Despite the fact that Ging left his son with his relatives in order to pursue his own dreams, Gon becomes determined to follow in his father's footsteps, pass the rigorous "Hunter Examination", and eventually find his father to become a Hunter in his own right.

== Plot ==
Gon Freecss learns his father is alive and a renowned "Hunter", an elite, licensed adventurer. Determined to understand why his father chose that life over raising him, Gon leaves his home to take the dangerous Hunter Exam, befriending Kurapika, Leorio, and Killua while facing intense psychological and physical trials.

== Release ==
Hunter × Hunter was produced by Nippon Animation and directed by Kazuhiro Furuhashi. A total of 62 episodes were broadcast on Fuji Television and its affiliates from October 16, 1999, to March 31, 2001. The series has additionally aired on the satellite television station Animax. Marvelous Entertainment released all episodes of the series in Japan on DVD in 13 separate volumes between September 20, 2000, and September 19, 2001.

Viz Media licensed the Hunter × Hunter anime for distribution in the Region 1 market, where it was released across four DVD box-sets. The first set was released on December 9, 2008, and the final was released on December 1, 2009. Starting with the second volume, Viz partnered with Warner Home Video in distributing the DVDs. Hunter × Hunter began airing in the United States on the Funimation Channel in the spring of 2009.

The background music for the Hunter × Hunter anime and the three OVA series was composed by Toshihiko Sahashi. The anime series features two opening themes, "Ohayō." (おはよう。; lit. 'Good Morning') (1–48) by Keno and "Taiyō Wa Yoru mo Kagayaku" (太陽は夜も輝く; lit. 'The Sun Shines at Night') (49–62) by Wino, and three closing themes: "Kaze no Uta" (風のうた; lit. 'Wind Song') (1–31) by Minako Honda, and "EJan-Do You Feel Like I Feel?" (Eじゃん-Do You Feel Like I Feel?) (32–50), and "Hotaru" (蛍; lit. 'Firefly'), (51–62) both by Nagai Masato.

=== Original video animations ===
When the Hunter × Hunter anime covered most of its source material by 2001, Nippon Animation made the decision to end the adaptation rather than continue it with filler. Due to fans' unsatisfied reactions to the conclusion of the television series, three subsequent original video animations (OVAs) were produced by Nippon Animation. These carried the plot from where the broadcast left off during the Yorknew City arc and covered the Greed Island arc. The first OVA series was directed by Satoshi Saga and ran for eight episodes in four released volumes from January 17 to April 17, 2002. The second OVA series, Hunter × Hunter: Greed Island, was directed by Yukihiro Matsushita and ran for eight episodes in four released volumes from February 19 to May 21, 2003. The third OVA series, Hunter × Hunter: G.I. Final, was directed by Makoto Sato and ran for 14 episodes in seven released volumes from March 3 to August 18, 2004. After the original anime's initial run on Animax, the OVAs were aired successively. Viz has shown no intention of releasing English versions of the OVAs.

== Reception ==
The first Hunter × Hunter anime series enjoyed much more modest popularity than the manga. Newtype listed it as having a Japanese television rating of 10.5 for the fourth quarter of 2000. The show's viewership was ranked number six among the top ten anime television series in Japan for February 2001. The series was voted as the 16th best anime of 2000 in the Anime Grand Prix and rose to fourth place the following year. In 2001, the staff of the magazine listed Hunter × Hunter as the 94th most important anime of all time. In a 2006 web poll conducted in Japan by the network TV Asahi, the Hunter × Hunter television series was voted 28th best anime of all time. In 2010, Mania.com's Briana Lawrence listed Hunter × Hunter at number nine on the website's "10 Anime Series That Need a Reboot".

Critical reception for the first Hunter × Hunter television adaptation has been generally favorable. Miyako Matsuda of Protoculture Addicts, Carl Kimlinger of Anime News Network, and Derrick L. Tucker of THEM Anime Reviews all expressed positive views of the series' narrative and characters. Matsuda admired the adventure-filled world of Hunter × Hunter and the practical character qualities of friendship, effort, and victory inserted by Togashi. Beginning with the second Viz DVD volume, Kimlinger summarized, "Togashi's plotting is canny and occasionally insightful and Furuhashi's visuals inventive yet attuned to the measured pacing of the series. Together they create a shonen action series that is both fun to watch and curiously respectful of its audience's intelligence. A strange combination indeed." Tucker admitted to being "bewitched" by the series mainly due to the remarkable and original characters, especially the interplay between the vastly different personalities of the Phantom Troupe members. Kimlinger gave particular praise to the characteristics of the complex villain Hisoka and the deep, emotional transformation of Kurapika in the latter half of the series. In a review for Anime News Network, Theron Martin found the initial fifteen episodes entertaining. He commended the series for its clever writing and a twist where a tournament official is held accountable for their unfair actions. Martin also noted that the protagonist, Gon, possesses an innate likability reminiscent of Goku's character.

The art and animation of the Hunter × Hunter anime have also been commended by the press. Kimlinger and Tucker were impressed by the art direction of Hunter × Hunter, the former of whom critiquing the adaptation of Togashi's work by Furuhashi as having "understated energy and flair, making the most of the era's (1999) mix of traditional and CG animation to bring Gon and friends' physical feats to fluid, exhilarating life." Martin faulted both the artwork and the subtle differences in character design. "The artistry not only shows its age but, in fact, looks older than it actually is," the reviewer commented, "hearkening back to a day when digital coloring and CG enhancements were not ubiquitous and allowances for a rougher look were greater." Opinions of the series' sound and music have been somewhat mixed. Martin positively noted the soundtrack as the strongest production point of Hunter × Hunter, and was satisfied with both the English translation of the script and Ocean's voice-overs. Tucker found the music satisfactory and improved as the series progressed, but did not think it lived up to its potential. Kimlinger agreeably felt the musical score to be appropriate in most instances, but criticized the English dub as "a letdown since day one".
