= Reza (album) =

Terry Gibbs plays Reza

Studio album by Terry Gibbs
- Released: 1966
- Recorded: March 30, 1966 United Recording, Hollywood, CA
- Genres: Jazz, easy listening
- Label: Dot
- Producers: Terry Gibbs, Shorty Rogers

Professional ratings
Review scores
Source	Rating
Billboard	(favorable)
Allmusic	3/5 stars

Reza is an album released by Terry Gibbs in August, 1966 by Dot DLP 3726 (mono) and DLP 25726 (stereo). It was arranged and produced by Shorty Rogers. The album was aimed at the pop and jazz markets. Billboard reviewed the album as "swingin, but not way out."

== Track listing ==
1. "Missouri Waltz"
2. "Autumn Leaves"
3. "Secret Agent Man"
4. "Norwegian Wood"
5. "Canadian Sunset"
6. "Sweet and Lovely"
7. "Star Dust"
8. "The Shadow of Your Smile"
9. "Reza"
10. "Soon"
11. "Ebb Tide"
12. "That Old Black Magic"

== Personnel ==
- Terry Gibbs – vibraphone
- Russ Freeman – piano
- Mike Melvoin – organ
- Dennis Budimir – guitar
- Donald Peake – guitar
- Lyle Ritz – bass
- Hal Blaine – drums
- Julius Wechter – percussion
