= Sonny Berman =

American jazz trumpeter (1925–1947)

Saul "Sonny" Berman (April 21, 1925 – January 16, 1947) was an American jazz trumpeter.

Berman was born in New Haven, Connecticut, United States. He began touring at age sixteen and performed with Louis Prima, Harry James and Benny Goodman, but is best known for his later work with Woody Herman. Berman was distinguished by his passionate and innovative soloing, and his versatility of tone—ranging from bold and emotional to sweetly muted. He was also known for his sense of humor, which often made its way into a playfulness and joyfulness found in his solo work.

Sonny Berman died at the age of 21 in New York City of heart failure, caused by a heroin overdose.

== Discography ==
- Sidewalks of Cuba (with Woody Herman), 1946
- Curbstone Scuffle, 1947
- Woodchopper's Holiday, 1946
- Jazz Immortal 1946, released 1954 [Esoteric ES-532]

With Georgie Auld

- Rainbow Mist (Delmark, 1944 [1992]) compilation of Apollo recordings
