= That Swing Thing! =

Live album by Terry Gibbs Quartet
- Released: 1962
- Recorded: April 5 and 8, 1961
- Venue: Shelley's Manne Hole, Los Angeles, CA
- Genre: 38:26
- Label: Verve V/V6 8467
- Producer: Jim Davis

Terry Gibbs chronology
Live at the Summit (1961)	That Swing Thing! (1962)	Straight Ahead (1962)

That Swing Thing! is an album recorded by American jazz vibraphonist and bandleader Terry Gibbs featuring performances recorded in 1961 in California and released on the Verve label.

== Reception ==
Professional ratings
Review scores
Source	Rating
AllMusic	2/5 stars

AllMusic stated "Vibraphonist Terry Gibbs has so much energy that even the ballads on this obscure Verve LP seem hyper ... Fun music".

== Track listing ==
All compositions by Terry Gibbs except where noted

1. "Let My People Blow" – 6:43
2. "Moanin'" (Bobby Timmons) – 8:00
3. "Stella by Starlight" (Victor Young, Ned Washington) – 6:07
4. "Three Blind Mice" – 5:20
5. "Blue Wednesday" – 5:22
6. "Mannehole March" – 6:54

== Personnel ==
- Terry Gibbs – vibraphone
- Pat Moran – piano
- Jimmy Bond – bass
- Gary Frommer – drums
