= Pamelia Kurstin =

American theremin player (born 1976)

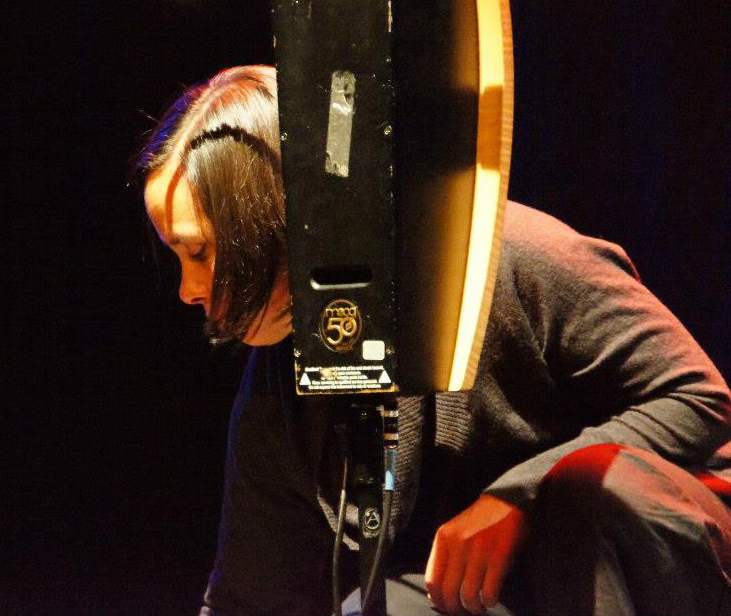
- Stickney in 2012

Background information
- Born: Pamela Stickney; May 28, 1976 (age 50); California, U.S.
- Genres: Classical, Electronic, Contemporary classical
- Occupations: musician, composer, author
- Instruments: Theremin, double bass, piano, cello
- Website: www.soundcloud.com/pamelia

Pamelia Stickney (formerly known as Pamelia Kurstin) is an American theremin player. She has performed and recorded with many artists including David Byrne, Marisa Monte, Yoko Ono, Béla Fleck and the Flecktones, David Garland, Seb Rochford, Otto Lechner and Simone Dinnerstein, and was instrumental to the final design of Robert Moog's Etherwave Pro Theremin, for which she was the primary test musician. Kurstin has made various film, television and radio appearances, most notably on Saturday Night Live. and in the 2004 documentary Moog.

Stickney has also presented talks at events such as TED. Her background as a jazz musician on the upright bass has led to develop a "walking bass" theremin technique. She was based in New York until 2005; she now lives in Vienna, Austria.

Stickney was first introduced to the theremin during production of the album Into the Oh in 1999 by Luaka Bop duo Geggy Tah – singer/writer Tommy Jordan and keyboardist Greg Kurstin. She recorded Gymnopedie in 2000 as a member of the theremin/keyboard duo called "The Kurstins" with her then-husband, Greg. Her first solo album Thinking Out Loud was released in 2007 on John Zorn's Tzadik label. In 2011 the London-based label Slowfoot released Ouch Evil Slow Hop, a collaboration between Pamelia and Seb Rochford.

In 2013, Stickney formed Blueblut with Mark Holub and Chris Janka. The Vienna-based trio released their first album hurts so gut on Bandcamp in 2014.

== Discography ==
Albums

- 2007: Thinking Out Loud
- 2013: Promotional Copy
- 2017: Transcendental Dissonance

Collaborations

- 2020: Vulneraries Vol. 5 (with David and Kenji Garland, credited to The Garlands with Pamelia Stickney)
- 2011: Ouch Evil Slow Hop (with Sebastian Rochford)
- 2011: Tunisia (with Pat Mastelotto)
- 2011: Besides Feldman (with Patrick Pulsinger, Hilary Jeffery, and Rozemarie Heggen)
- 2000: First Visit (with Gerry Gibbs and the Third Trio from the Sun, featuring Gerry Gibbs and Greg Kurstin)

Blueblut

- 2014: hurts so gut
- 2016: buttbutt
