= Mel Zelnick =

American jazz musician

Mel Zelnick (September 28, 1924 in Harlem – February 21, 2008 in Mayer, Arizona) was a jazz drummer who worked for Benny Goodman, Lennie Tristano, and Boyd Raeburn.

In the 1960s, he opened a music store in Canoga Park, California, with Terry Gibbs acting as a partner to help with publicity. The Music Stop was the first teaching facility of the drum guru Freddie Gruber.

Zelnick worked for Capitol Records and accompanied Peggy Lee, Patti Page, Nat King Cole, and Ray Charles He developed an interest in gemology and received four certificates from the Gemological Institute of America.
