= Gerry Gibbs (musician) =

American jazz drummer (born 1964)

- Born: January 15, 1964 (age 62); New York City, US
- Genres: Jazz
- Instrument: Drums
- Website: gerrygibbsmusician.com

Gerry Gibbs (born 15 January 1964) is an American jazz drummer.

== Career ==
Son of vibraphonist and band leader Terry Gibbs, Gerry Gibbs grew up in Southern California and received his first drum set from Buddy Rich at age four. At the age of seven, Gibbs had his first appearances on television shows such as The Steve Allen Show, in which he was allowed to play a three-minute solo in 1971. His first recordings were made in 1987 when he performed in his father's band with Buddy DeFranco in the Chicago club The Jazz Showcase, released on their album Chicago Fire. In the following years he played with John Campbell, Steve Amirault (That's What, with Seamus Blake), in the Terry Gibbs Quartet with Uri Caine, and with Jed Levy (Sleight of Hand, with George Colligan and Ron McClure).

In late 1995, Gibbs recorded his debut album The Thrasher with his sextet, which included Ravi Coltrane, Joe Locke, Billy Childs, Mark Feldman, and Darek Oleszkiewicz. This was followed in 2009 by Moving On, Never Looking Back, with Justin Vasquez, Rob Hardt, Eric Hargett, and Andy Langham. In later years he worked with Ted Falcon, Joe Negri, Jim Butler, Robert Sanders, Doug Webb and with Eric Hargett and Joey DeFrancesco. In 2010, a tribute album was created for Miles Davis. With Kenny Barron and Ron Carter, he formed his Gerry Gibbs Thrasher Dream Trio, which has released three albums since 2013. In jazz, he was involved in 28 recording sessions between 1987 and 2017.

He released Songs From My Father in 2021, a homage to the songbook of his father, and featuring several former members of his Thrasher Dream Trio. These were some of the final recordings made by Chick Corea.

== Discography ==
- Gerry Gibbs and the Third Trio from the Sun: First Visit (2000), with Greg Kurstin, Pamelia Kurstin
- Gerry Gibbs Thrasher Dream Trio (2013), with Kenny Barron, Ron Carter
- Gerry Gibbs Thrasher Dream Trio: We’re Back (2014), with Kenny Barron, Ron Carter und Steve Wilson, Warren Wolf, Larry Goldings
- Benito Gonzalez / Gerry Gibbs / Essiet Okon Essiet: Passion Reverence Transcendence – The Music of McCoy Tyner (2017)
- Songs From My Father (Whaling City, 2021)
