= Terry Gibbs =

American jazz vibraphonist and band leader (born 1924)

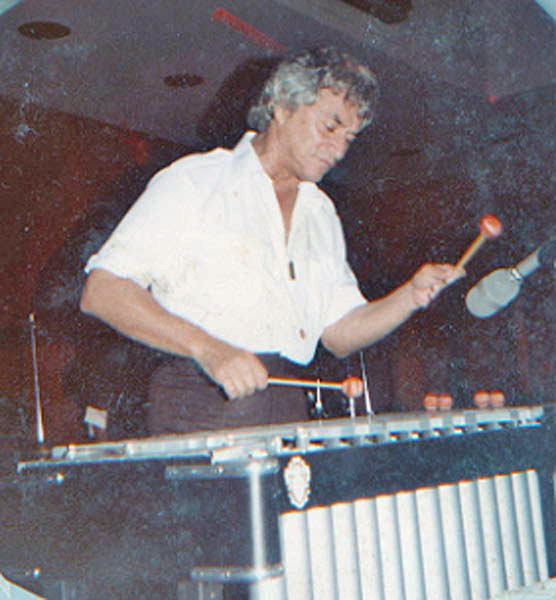
- Gibbs in Florida, 1975

Background information
- Born: Julius Gubenko; October 13, 1924 (age 101); New York City, U.S.
- Genres: Jazz
- Occupation: Musician
- Instrument: Vibraphone
- Years active: 1946–present
- Labels: Savoy, EmArcy, Verve, Contemporary, Mack Avenue, Whaling City Sound
- Website: www.terrygibbs.com

External videos
- Oral History, Terry Gibbs tells a fantastic story of the first time he found himself on stage with Lionel Hampton. Interview date February 9, 2005, NAMM Oral History Library

Terry Gibbs (born Julius Gubenko; October 13, 1924) is an American jazz vibraphonist and band leader.

Gibbs has performed or recorded with Tommy Dorsey, Chubby Jackson, Buddy Rich, Woody Herman, Benny Goodman, Alice Coltrane, Louie Bellson, Charlie Shavers, Mel Tormé, Buddy DeFranco, and others. Gibbs also worked in film and TV studios in Los Angeles.

== Background ==
On being discharged from the armed forces, where he played drums in military bands, Gibbs worked in New York with Bill DeArango and recorded with Tiny Kahn in Aaron Sachs' quintet (1946).

In the 1950–1951 season, Gibbs was a popular guest on Star Time on the DuMont Television Network. Thereafter, he was a regular in 1953–1954 on NBC's Judge for Yourself.

In the late 1950s, he appeared on NBC's The Steve Allen Show, on which he regularly played lively vibraphone duets with the entertainer and composer. In 1997, he appeared on Steve Allen's 75th Birthday Celebration on PBS. Gibbs was also the bandleader on the short-lived That Regis Philbin Show. As an instrumentalist, together with his big band, the Dream Band, Gibbs has won prestigious polls, such as those of Downbeat and Metronome.

He turned 100 on October 13, 2024. His son is the jazz drummer Gerry Gibbs.

== The Dream Band ==
When Gibbs moved from New York to California in 1958 he began planning for his next big band album. In early 1959 he booked extended residencies at two Los Angeles night clubs, the Seville and the Sundown, for what became known as the Dream Band.

The band usually played on a Sunday, Monday or Tuesday night when the cream of Hollywood jazz and studio musicians would be available. The core band - which was already playing as "Jazz Wave Big Band" at the Sundown - always remained stable with Mel Lewis holding down the drum chair.

Some of the key players were lead altoist Joe Maini, tenor saxists Bill Holman and Med Flory, trumpeters Al Porcino and Conte Candoli and trombonists Frank Rosolino and Bob Enevoldsen.

New arrangements were commissioned from Bill Holman, Marty Paich, Med Flory, Manny Albam and Al Cohn, among others, to feature Gibbs’ vibes in front of the band. The band released four albums from 1959 to 1961.

- 1959: Launching a New Band – some versions are titled Launching a New Sound in Music
- 1960: Swing Is Here!
- 1961: The Exciting Terry Gibbs Big Band!!!!!! – reissued as Dream Band, Vol. 4: Main Stem
- 1961: Explosion! – reissued as Dream Band, Vol. 5: The Big Cat

Five additional albums of unissued live material recorded in 1959 have been released since 1986.

- Dream Band
- The Dream Band, Vol. 2: The Sundown Sessions
- Dream Band, Vol. 3: Flying Home
- Dream Band, Vol. 6: One More Time
- Dream Band, Vol. 7: The Lost Tapes, 1959

== The Music Stop ==
In the mid 1960s, Gibbs opened a musical instrument store in Canoga Park, California, with former Benny Goodman drummer Mel Zelnick. Terry Gibbs and Mel Zelnick Music Stop was also the first teaching facility of Freddie Gruber and Henry Bellson, brother of Louie.

== Discography ==
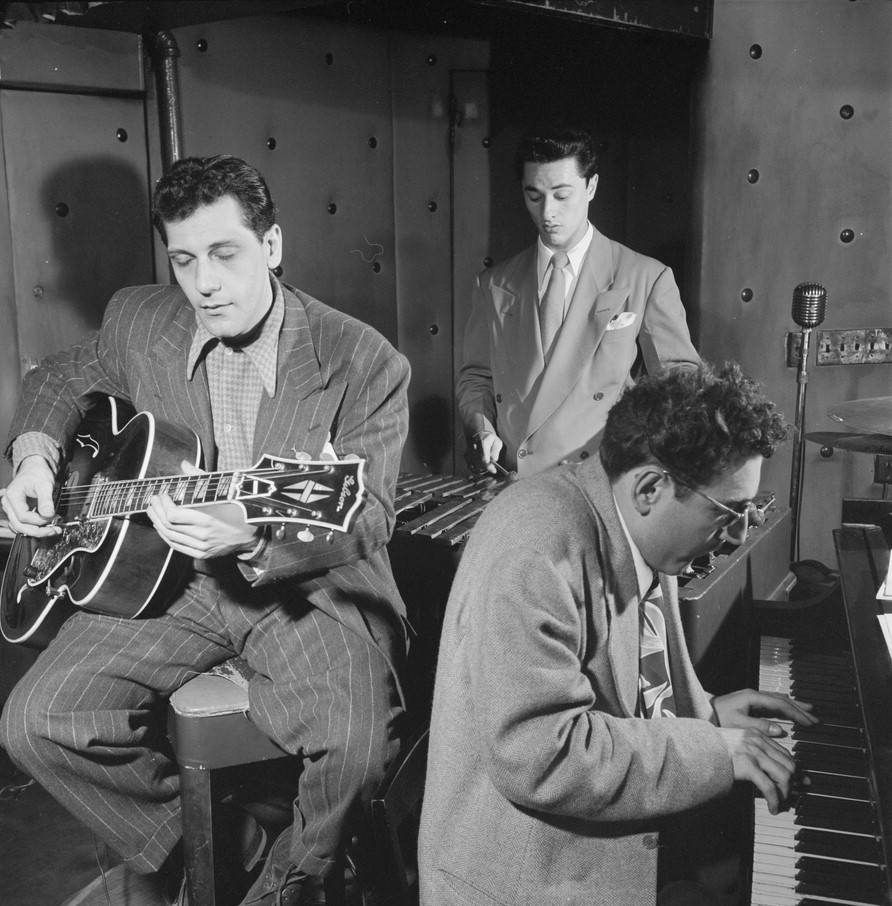
Bill DeArango, Terry Gibbs, and Harry Biss perform at the Three Deuces in New York City in 1947.

- Good Vibes (Savoy, 1951)
- Terry Gibbs Sextet (Savoy, 1954)
- Terry Gibbs (Emarcy, 1956)
- Mallets a-Plenty (Emarcy, 1956)
- Vibes on Velvet (Emarcy, 1956)
- Swing...Not Spring! (Savoy, 1956)
- Harry Babasin and the Jazz Pickers/Terry Gibbs (VSOP, 1957)
- Jazz Band Ball (VSOP, 1957)
- Swingin' (Emarcy, 1957)
- Terry Gibbs Plays the Duke (Emarcy, 1957)
- More Vibes on Velvet (EmArcy, 1958) with the sax section from the Dream Band
- Launching a New Band, aka Launching a New Sound in Music (EmArcy, 1959)
- Dream Band (Contemporary, 1959)
- The Dream Band, Vol. 2: The Sundown Sessions (Contemporary, 1959)
- Dream Band, Vol. 3: Flying Home (Contemporary, 1959)
- Vibrations (Interlude, 1959)
- Dream Band, Vol. 6: One More Time (Contemporary, 1959)
- Dream Band, Vol. 7: The Lost Tapes, 1959 (Whaling City Sound, 1959 [2024])
- Swing Is Here (Verve, 1960)
- Music from Cole Porter's Can Can (Verve, 1960)
- Steve Allen Presents Terry Gibbs at the Piano (Signature, 1960)
- The Exciting Terry Gibbs Big Band (Verve, 1961) – reissued as Dream Band, Vol. 4: Main Stem (Contemporary)
- Explosion! (Mercury, 1961) – reissued as Dream Band, Vol. 5: The Big Cat (Contemporary)
- That Swing Thing! (Verve, 1962)
- Straight Ahead (Verve, 1962)
- Terry Gibbs Plays Jewish Melodies in Jazztime (Mercury, 1963)
- El Nutto (Limelight, 1963)
- Gibbs/Nistico (Time, 1963)
- Hootenanny My Way (Time, 1963)
- Take It from Me (Impulse!, 1964)
- Latino (Roost, 1964)
- It's Time We Met (Mainstream, 1965)
- Terry Gibbs Quartet (1965)
- Reza (Dot, 1966)
- Bopstacle Course (Xanadu, 1974)
- Sessions Live: Terry Gibbs, Pete Jolly, and Red Norvo (Calliope, 1976)
- Live at the Lord (Jazz a la Carte 1978)
- Smoke 'em Up (Jazz a la Carte 1978)
- Jazz Party: First Time Together with Buddy DeFranco (Palo Alto 1981)
- Air Mail Special (Contemporary, 1981)
- Now's the Time with Buddy DeFranco (Tall Tree, 1984)
- The Latin Connection (Contemporary, 1986)
- Chicago Fire with Buddy DeFranco (Contemporary, 1987)
- Holiday for Swing with Buddy DeFranco (Contemporary, 1988)
- Memories of You: A Tribute to Benny Goodman with Buddy DeFranco, Herb Ellis (Contemporary, 1991)
- Kings of Swing with Buddy DeFranco (Contemporary, 1992)
- Play That Song: Live at the 1994 Floating Festival (Chiaroscuro, 1994)
- Wham (Chiaroscuro, 1999)
- Terry Gibbs and Buddy DeFranco Play Steve Allen (Contemporary, 1999)
- From Me to You: A Tribute to Lionel Hampton (Mack Avenue, 2003)
- 52nd & Broadway: Songs of the Bebop Era (Mack Avenue, 2004)
- Feelin' Good: Live in Studio (Mack Avenue, 2005)
- Findin' the Groove (Jazzed Media, 2006)
- 92 Years Young: Jammin at the Gibbs House (Whaling City Sound, 2017)

With Leonard Cohen

- Death of a Ladies' Man (Columbia, 1977)

With Dion DiMucci

- Born to Be with You (Phil Spector, 1975)

With Morgana King

- Sings the Blues (Mercury, 1957)

With John Lennon

- Rock 'n' Roll (Apple, 1975)

With Liza Minnelli

- Gently (Angel, 1996)

== Bibliography ==
- Gibbs, Terry; Ginell, Cary (2003). Good Vibes: A Life in Jazz. Scarecrow Press. ISBN 978-0810845862.
