= Wino =

Wino may refer to:

- WINO (band), a Japanese rock band
- WINO (FM), a radio station (91.9 FM) licensed to serve Wakins Glen, New York, United States
- WRFI (FM), a radio station (89.7 FM) licensed to serve Odessa, New York, which held the call sign WINO from 2009 to 2022
- Wino (particle), hypothetical superpartners of W bosons
- Scott "Wino" Weinrich (born 1961), an American rock musician
- An alcoholic who prefers wine
