= Colored Musicians Club =

- U.S. National Register of Historic Places
- New York State Register of Historic Places
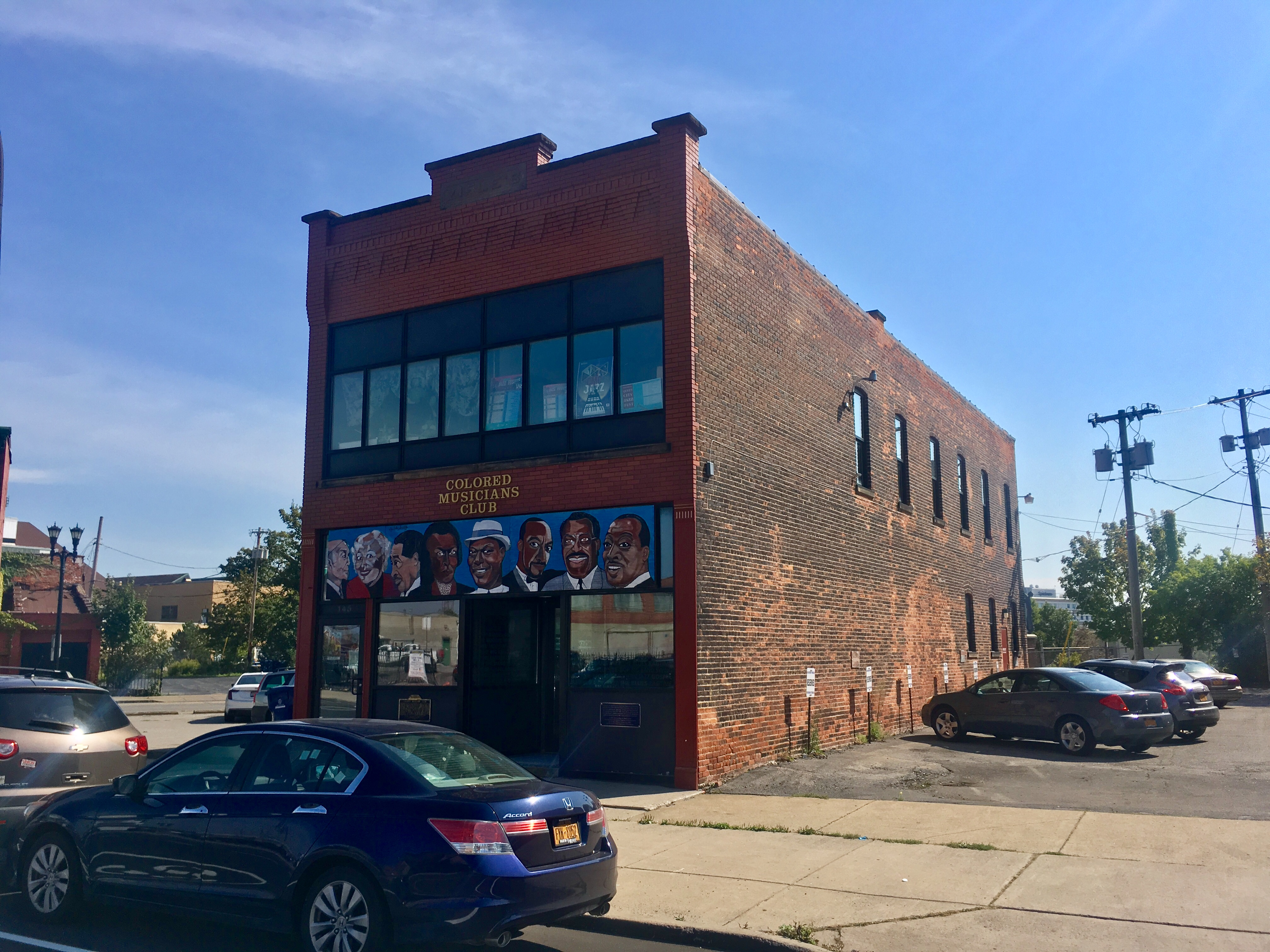
- Colored Musicians Club, October 2019

- Location within New York Location within the United States
- Location: 145 Broadway, Buffalo, New York
- Coordinates: 42.8867°N 78.8679°W
- NRHP reference No.: 100002833
- NYSRHP No.: 02940.003113

Significant dates
- Added to NRHP: August 28, 2018
- Designated NYSRHP: July 2, 2018

Colored Musicians Club is a historic jazz club located at 145 Broadway, Buffalo, New York, formally founded in 1935 by members of Buffalo Local 533 of the American Federation of Musicians, which was all-Black due to the segregation of labor unions. Local 533 had around 500 members at that time.

The building had been built between 1880 and 1900 by Charles Zifle, a shoemaker, and later housed a cigar shop and then a pool hall; several labor union locals had used the downstairs offices. In 1934 the owner of a secondhand store fixture business bought the building, just as members of Buffalo Local 533 were considering doing the same, to house their informal social club. The union members rented the upstairs in early 1934, acquired the building early the next year, and obtained a license to operate as a club on February 24, 1935. The club was separately incorporated on May 14, 1935; the members did this to avoid its loss to the BLack community if the union locals ever integrated.

The incorporation papers stated the club's mission, which was " [To] foster the principles of unity and cooperation among the colored musicians of Erie County, N.Y., to develop and promote the civic, social, recreational and physical well-being of its members; to improve and enhance the professional and economic status of its members; to stimulate its members to greater musical expression; to encourage and develop a fuller appreciation of music on the part of its members and the public; and generally to unite its members in the bonds of friendship, good fellowship and mutual understanding."

The club became an important source of support and community for Black artists in Buffalo, especially in the club's early days in the Great Depression. In the next few decades, famous Black performers like Louis Armstrong, Count Basie, Duke Ellington, Ella Fitzgerald, Dizzy Gillespie, and Earl Hines played there.

After protracted negotiations, on January 1, 1969, Local 533 merged with Local 43, the white local, with the new local called "Buffalo Musicians' Association, Local 92"; the club however remained independent.

The building was listed on the National Register of Historic Places in 2018 and a museum about the club and its role in the history of jazz and Buffalo, was created on the first floor that same year.
