= Wino (band) =

Japanese band

- Also known as: Bog Myrtle Star
- Origin: Tokyo, Japan
- Genres: Hard rock Alternative rock
- Years active: 1995–2002, 2024–present
- Label: Speedstar Records
- Members: Jun Yoshimura; Naoyuki Hisanaga; Shinichiro Togawa; Hiroyuki Kawazoe; Masataka Kuronuma
- Website: https://www.wino.tokyo/

Wino (ワイノ, waino) (stylized as WINO and pronounced "wine-oh") is a Japanese rock band that formed in 1995. Originally, the band's name was Bog Myrtle Star (ボグ・マイトルスター, bogu maitorusutā). The band was renamed WINO in 1996. One of Wino's biggest hits was "Taiyo wa Yoru mo Kagayaku" (The Sun Also Shines at Night), the second opening in the 1999 anime series Hunter × Hunter. Due to later contractual issues, it became difficult for them to continue major-label activities. After finishing the nationwide tour accompanying their 4th album Everlast, they disbanded in November 2002. In February 2024, the band reunited.

== Overview ==
While attending Meiji Gakuin University, Jun Yoshimura and Shinichiro Togawa, who had been friends since high school, were joined by Naoyuki Hisanaga, who had come to Tokyo, and in September 1995 they formed a band called Bog Myrtle Star. Later, Hiroyuki Kawazoe and Masataka Kuronuma, who attended the same university, joined the group, and in March 1996 the band changed its name to WINO.

In the same year, they participated in and released the indie compilation album Return Of Guitar Lightnin' Horror Smilin' through Gods Pop Records alongside bands such as Zoobombs, Lucy Van Pelt (later named advantage Lucy) and Penguin Noise.

After continuing releases on the indie scene, they made their debut in September 1998 with the maxi single "Devil’s Own [mix No.4]". In February 1999, backed by strong tie-in promotions mainly from foreign-affiliated record stores, they finally released their debut album Useless Music.

In the summer of that year, they performed at Fuji Rock Festival, and at the end of the year they released their self-titled second album WINO. During the tour accompanying the album's release, the semi-final show (March 14, 2000) was held as a one-man live concert at Akasaka Blitz, which was a success (the performance was broadcast on NHK-BS2's Shin Mayonaka no Ōkoku). They were especially active for the first year and a half after their debut.

After that, in May 2001, they released their third album Dirge No.9, which included their biggest hit single "Taiyo wa Yoru mo Kagayaku" (The Sun Also Shines at Night). In August 2002, they released their fourth album Everlast.

However, after completing their second tour, "HERE COMES THAT FEELING!", they announced their disbandment on November 22 on the website of their management company, Aloha Production, following their final appearance at the live event "Club Snoozer."

Their fan club was called FC WINO.

== Style and influences ==
Their sound is characterized by a thick groove heavily influenced by the British rock scene from the mid-1980s to the 1990s, particularly the Madchester movement. It is also distinctive for blending in the accessible melodies of Britpop that followed from that movement.

Yoshimura himself has stated regarding the artists who influenced him that he “listened to The La's and Cast constantly.” As for bands they are often compared to, such as The Stone Roses and Oasis, he hinted that they were not direct formative influences, saying, “Even if people say we sound like them, they weren’t part of my original musical experience.”

At the time of their debut, as evidenced by the strong promotion they received from foreign-affiliated record stores, their sound style openly and almost deliberately pushed forward their admiration for and roots in contemporary overseas bands of their generation. Since there were relatively few rock bands at the time that functioned effectively as danceable, floor-oriented music, they attracted significant attention from the music industry even during their indie period, and were warmly received by Japanese rock fans.

However, on the other hand, among Japanese listeners who favored overseas rock scenes (particularly the United Kingdom), their musical roots were easily associated with then-popular British bands such as Oasis, The Stone Roses, The Charlatans, and Primal Scream. As a result, some listeners began to focus on this aspect and view them in a more critical light.

== Members ==
- Jun Yoshimura (born October 19, 1975) - lead vocals
  - He writes and composes about 80% of the band's songs. Due to his father's job during his childhood, he lived in London, United Kingdom until the age of 3 and then in Rotterdam, Netherlands until the age of 13.
  - He is known for frequently changing his hairstyle, constantly trying new looks for albums, live performances and events.
  - During the band’s initial active years, he was the only married member and is also the father of one child (a daughter). The song "Chelsea Girl" from Everlast was dedicated to his daughter.
  - He also continues his music career through his solo project "JUN", based in both Japan and Hawaii, focusing on a pop-oriented electronic sound.
  - In 2016, he established an art gallery in Hawaii centered on surf culture called "Polu Gallery".
- Naoyuki Hisanaga (born April 2, 1975) - lead guitar
  - He was in a band during high school with actor Joe Odagiri.
  - After the band disbanded, while continuing activities as a member of Gold77, he established his own indie label, City Records, in 2006 and released recordings by several artists such as The High Streets, Eerectionn and Listen To The Silence. Currently, in addition to running the label and working as a singer-songwriter, he composes as a guitarist for The High Streets and Joe Odagiri's band, and has also begun working as a producer.
  - On October 22, 2008, he released his first solo album "Black Cat Murder Case (Part 1)". This album is the first in a trilogy, and features participation from Joe Odagiri and umu of FREAKYFROG (formerly of Beat Crusaders) among others.
- Shinichiro Togawa (born April 28, 1975) - rhythm guitar
  - Currently, he continues musical activities through his solo project The Creeplands (formerly Toguar), while also starting his career as the bassist for The High Streets.
- Hiroyuki Kawazoe (born November 23, 1975) - bass
- Masataka Kuronuma (born April 15, 1975) - drums
  - Since September 2006, he has joined Togawa's project The Creeplands as the drummer.

== History ==
In September 1995, Yoshimura, Togawa, and Hisanaga formed Bog Myrtle Star. Two months later, in November 1995, Kawazoe and Kuronuma joined, completing the lineup that would continue thereafter.

In March 1996, the band changed its name to WINO, as Yoshimura was drawn to the English word "wino", meaning an "alcoholic" or "wine addict" and renamed the band with the intention of conveying “a band with addictive music.” They began performing primarily at live houses such as Shimokitazawa CLUB Que, Shelter, and Shinjuku JAM. In December of the same year, they released the compilation album Return Of Guitar Lightnin' Horror Smilin' through Gods Pop Records. This release included two of their songs, "GOING OUT" and "Escape," with "GOING OUT" remaining particularly popular in their live performances even after their major debut.

In March 1998, the band traveled to the United Kingdom for three weeks to record music. Under the production of Dave Charles, known for his work on The Charlatans' album Tellin' Stories, they recorded songs including "Devil’s own" and "NEW SONG". In May 1998, they released "Devil's own '98.9.11 Live at Shelter" through boogaloo, which included one live track, followed by the release of "WATERMARK" (a single-track recording) through Hirami Records in July 1998.

On September 23, 1998, WINO made their major debut with "Devil's own [mix No.4]" under Victor/Speedstar Records, which reached No. 91 on the Oricon charts. In February 1999, they released their first album, Useless Music, which peaked at No. 38. This was followed by their second album, WINO, in December 1999, which reached No. 57 on the Oricon charts.

In December 2000, they released their seventh single, "Taiyo wa Yoru mo Kagayaku" ("The Sun Also Shines at Night"), which became their biggest hit and reached No. 35 on the charts. In May 2001, they released their third album, Dirge No.9, which peaked at No. 64. The following year, in August 2002, they released their fourth and final album, Everlast, which did not chart.

After completing their second tour, "HERE COMES THAT FEELING!", the band gave their final performance on November 22, 2002, at Club Snoozer held at Shinjuku LIQUIDROOM. On that same day, they announced their disbandment via the website of their management company, Aloha Production.

In January 2024, WINO announced that the band would resume activities. They performed on February 7 at Shibuya duo MUSIC EXCHANGE as part of the live event "Downtown Channel vol.5".

== Discography ==
=== Albums ===
	Release date	Title	Catalog number	Tracklist	Notes
1st	February 24, 1999; June 24, 2015	Useless Music	VICL-60348; MSCL-60770:MEG-CD	1. Devil's own 2. Inhaler; 3. WILD FLOWER; 4. Can't leave the here 5. SISTER'S HIGH; 6. White Room; 7. Confusion; 8. She; 9. Call the SUN; 10. LOADED; 11. Unfinished Vibes	Oricon peak: #38
2nd	December 16, 1999; June 24, 2015	Wino	VICL-60516; MSCL-60771:MEG-CD	1. The Action; 2. Tomorrow; 3. Velvet; 4. Hospital; 5. GLORY; 6. FREAKS; 7. Mirror; 8. We are the boys 9. Thank you 10. Anyhow; 11. Friend of mine 12. ain't gonna lose	Oricon peak: #57
3rd	May 23, 2001; June 24, 2015	Dirge No.9	VICL-60733; MSCL-60772:MEG-CD	1. New Dawn F 2. Resolution; 3. Mad Silence; 4. Hurt; 5. The Sun Also Shines at Night; 6. Butterfly; 7. Empty Soul; 8. Imagine, still 9. My Life; 10. Sullen Days －album version－; 11. Dirge No.9	Oricon peak: #64
4th	August 21, 2002; June 24, 2015	Everlast	VICL-60927; MSCL-60773:MEG-CD	1. Warsaw; 2. Everlast; 3. LOVE IS HERE; 4. Jesus; 5. All About a Boy; 6. Philadelphia; 7. Chelsea Girl; 8. Forever Young; 9. Not Alone; 10. Freedom Song; 11. Go Straight Song!	Produced by Junji Yayoshi
B-side collection	January 22, 2003; December 19, 2007	Lion	VICL-61077:CCCD; VICL-62698:CD	1. New Song; 2. WATERMARK ～Ver.3～; 3. THUNDER; 4. RIDE ON; 5. SEA CASTLE; 6. Teenage tears 7. SPIN; 8. Songs of Shadow; 9. Talk to me 10. Rainbow; 11. a new world 12. Lost Communication; 13. Little Saviour; 14. Come Together Now; 15. No Enemies; 16. Break Down The Long Road, Break Down The Wall; 17. Freedom Song	

=== Singles ===
	Release date	Title	Catalog number	Tracklist	Notes
1st	September 23, 1998; May 27, 2015	Devil's Own [mix No.4]	VICL-35034; MSCL-12705:MEG-CD	1. Devil’s own 2. New Song; 3. WATERMARK	Oricon peak: #91
2nd	December 19, 1998; May 27, 2015	Loaded	VICL-35041; MSCL-12706:MEG-CD	1. Loaded; 2. RIDE ON; 3. THUNDER	
3rd	May 26, 1999; May 27, 2015	Ain't Gonna Lose	VICL-35066; MSCL-12707:MEG-CD	1. ain`t gonna lose 2. Any how 3. SEA CASTLE	Oricon peak: #78
4th	October 21, 1999; May 27, 2015	Tomorrow	VICL-35086; MSCL-12708:MEG-CD	1. Tomorrow; 2. Teenage tears 3. Long Day	Oricon peak: #64
5th	March 23, 2000; May 27, 2015	The Action (All I Really Want to Do)	VICL-35114; MSCL-12709:MEG-CD	1. The Action(All I really want to do); 2. SPIN; 3. The Action(From Dusk Till Dawn Mix by Captain Funk)	
6th	August 23, 2000; May 27, 2015	Sullen Days	VICL-35168; MSCL-12710:MEG-CD	1. Sullen Days; 2. Songs of Shadow; 3. Talk to me	Featuring Tabito Nanao
7th	December 27, 2000; May 27, 2015	Taiyou wa Yoru mo Kagayaku	VICL-35216; MSCL-12711:MEG-CD	1. The Sun Also Shines at Night; 2. Rainbow; 3. a new world	Oricon peak: #35
8th	April 21, 2001; May 27, 2015	New Dawn F	VICL-35239; MSCL-12712:MEG-CD	1. New Dawn F 2. Lost Communication; 3. Little Saviour; 4. Inhaler -Live-; (Enhanced) CD-EXTRA format	
9th	December 19, 2001; May 27, 2015	Go Straight Song!	VICL-35341; MSCL-12713:MEG-CD	1. Go Straight Song!; 2. No Enemies; 3. Come Together Now	
10th	May 22, 2002; May 27, 2015	Not Alone	VICL-35396; MSCL-12714:MEG-CD	1. Not Alone; 2. Not Alone -SUGIURUMN hottest day of june MIX-; 3. Not Alone -Niddle’s 'Yes, We are not' Remix-	
11th	August 7, 2002; May 27, 2015	Love Is Here	VICL-35418; MSCL-12715:MEG-CD	1. LOVE IS HERE; 2. Brake Down The Long Road, Brake Down The Wall; 3. Freedom Song	Produced by Seiji Kameda

=== Compilations ===
	Release date	Title	Catalog number	Tracklist	Notes
1st	March 19, 2003; June 24, 2015	The Best of Wino - Volume 1	VICL-61095; MSCL-60774:MEG-CD	1. The Action (All I Really Want to Do); 2. Everlast; 3. Thank You; 4. Wild Flower; 5. Tomorrow; 6. My Life; 7. Dirge No.9; 8. Loaded; 9. Inhaler; 10. Warsaw; 11. New Dawn F 12. Go Straight Song!; 13. Taiyou wa Yoru mo Kagayaku; 14. Going Out; 15. Devil's Own (Mix No.4); 16. Friend of Mine	Music selection and supervision by Soichiro Tanaka, Editor-in-Chief of Snoozer

=== DVD ===
	Release date	Title	Catalog number	Tracklist	Notes
1st	January 22, 2003	Lion	VIBL-95	1. -opening-; 2. The Action; 3. White Room; 4. -movie-; 5. Velvet; 6. -movie-; 7. Devil's Own; 8. -movie-; 9. Watermark; 10. -movie-; 11. Taiyo wa Yoru mo Kagayaku; 12. Everlast; 13. -movie-; 14. Inhaler (performed at Akasaka Blitz on 14 March 2000); 15. New Dawn F 16. Love Is Here; 17. -movie-; 18. Go Straight Song! (performed at Shinjuku Liquid Room on 22 November 2002); 19. -ending-	Music video collection + 2 live performance videos

=== Compilation appearances ===
Release date	Title	Catalog number	Songs	Notes
December 29, 1996	Return of Guitar Lightnin' Horror Smilin'	CJGP-4012	1. Escape; 2. Going Out	God's Pop Records
October 9, 2002	あろは～aloha all cast presents“12 smile & pray”	SRCL-5431	Rūju no Dengon	A cover album of Showa-era pop songs by the bands affiliated with Aloha Production.
May 31, 2006	Football Music Album Yell	VICL-61940	Not Alone	Speedstar
February 25, 2009	Tange Kouki Video Collection	TFBQ-18097	New Dawn F	Toy's Factory; Oricon peak: 184th
January 24, 2006	Hunter × Hunter Single Collection	MICA-0202	Taiyo Wa Yoru Mo Kagayaku	Miya Records

== Live performances ==
- SPACE SHOWER TV SWEET LOVE SHOWER with Various Artists (1998)
- Fuji Rock Festival with Various Artists (1999)
- The Charlatans Japan Tour with WINO as opening act (1999)
  - December 1 (Wed) - Zepp Tokyo
  - December 3 (Fri) - CLUB CITTA, Kawasaki
  - December 5 (Sun) - Zepp Fukuoka
  - December 8 (Wed) - Zepp Osaka
- au Sound Marina with Various Artists (2000)
- RUSH BALL with Various Artists (2000)
- LIVE DI:GA SPECIAL ACT I "Leave Remembrance Songs" with Various Artists (2000)
- Fuji Rock Festival with Various Artists (2024)
