= De Lawd's Blues =

Studio album by Billy Mitchell
- Released: 1980
- Recorded: June 26, 1980
- Genre: Jazz
- Length: 48:39
- Label: Xanadu; 182
- Producer: Don Schlitten

Billy Mitchell chronology
Night Flight to Dakar (1980)	De Lawd's Blues (1980)

De Lawd's Blues is an album by saxophonist Billy Mitchell recorded in 1980 for Xanadu Records.

== Reception ==
Professional ratings
Review scores
Source	Rating
Allmusic	4/5 stars

The Allmusic review by Scott Yanow stated "Despite the mostly obscure material, the interpretations are purely straight-ahead, falling between bop and hard bop in style. The musicians all play up to par on Mitchell's third and final Xanadu album as a leader".

== Track listing ==
1. "B & B" (Billy Mitchell) – 10:48
2. "Not Just to Be in Love Again" (Dolo Coker) – 6:11
3. "Prompt" (Benny Bailey) – 7:59
4. "De Lawd's Blues" (Mitchell) – 11:06
5. "Perpetual Stroll" (Rufus Reid) – 12:35

== Personnel ==
- Billy Mitchell – tenor saxophone
- Benny Bailey – trumpet
- Tommy Flanagan – piano
- Rufus Reid – bass
- Jimmy Cobb – drums
