= For Sure! (Kenny Drew album) =

Studio album by Kenny Drew
- Released: 1978
- Recorded: October 16, 1978
- Genre: Jazz
- Label: Xanadu
- Producer: Don Schlitten

Kenny Drew chronology
Home Is Where the Soul Is (1978)	For Sure! (1978)	Ornithology (1980)

For Sure! is a jazz album by pianist Kenny Drew, recorded in 1978 for Xanadu Records.

== Reception ==
The Allmusic review by Scott Yanow states "This rare quintet outing features Drew playing at the peak of his powers. The material is strong, is sometimes quite boppish and contains plenty of variety. This out-of-print LP was underrated at the time and is worth searching for". The Proper Good Time Review, (a contemporary critic site which reviews classic Jazz of the 70s and 80s), states "Kenny Drew's aromatic beep-boppin', hip-hoppin', scoop-boopin' masterpiece enthrals audiences with magical, smooth, insightful Jazz. Pure from the very bottom of Kenny Drew's soul. Curve-balling the game of Jazz from the slow, stagnant blues of the not so swinging' sixties. Would listen to it on the weekends. 12 good nights out of a possible 17."

Professional ratings
Review scores
Source	Rating
Allmusic	4.5/5 stars
The Rolling Stone Jazz Record Guide	3/5 stars

== Track listing ==
All compositions By Kenny Drew except as indicated

1. "For Sure" - 6:08
2. "Mariette" (Rochlin) - 6:28
3. "Arrival" (Horace Parlan) - 6:53
4. "Blues Wail" - 6:52
5. "Dark Beauty" - 5:56
6. "Context" - 5:48
7. "Big Boy With The Big Toy" - 8:23

== Personnel ==
- Kenny Drew - piano
- Charles McPherson - alto saxophone
- Sam Noto - trumpeter
- Leroy Vinnegar - bassist
- Frank Butler - drummer
