= This Is Criss! =

This is Criss!

Studio album by Sonny Criss
- Released: 1966
- Recorded: October 21, 1966
- Studio: Van Gelder Studio, Englewood Cliffs, NJ
- Genre: Jazz
- Length: 39:28
- Label: Prestige; 7511
- Producer: Don Schlitten

Sonny Criss chronology
Mr. Blues Pour Flirter (1963)	This is Criss! (1966)	Portrait of Sonny Criss (1967)

This is Criss! is an album by saxophonist Sonny Criss recorded in 1966 and released on the Prestige label.

== Reception ==
Professional ratings
Review scores
Source	Rating
AllMusic	4.5/5 stars
The Penguin Guide to Jazz Recordings	3.5/4 stars

AllMusic awarded the album 4½ stars with its review by Stephen Cook stating, "Sonny Criss qualifies as one of the most overlooked giants of West Coast jazz. His sound – like most alto players of the bebop and hard bop days – was heavily influenced by Charlie Parker, but Criss still managed to forge an original style featuring a very original melodic bent with loads of bluesy underpinnings. The goods can be optimally previewed on this great Prestige date from 1966."

== Track listing ==
1. "Black Coffee" (Sonny Burke, Paul Francis Webster) – 7:52
2. "Days of Wine and Roses" (Henry Mancini, Johnny Mercer) – 3:20
3. "When Sunny Gets Blue" (Marvin Fisher, Jack Segal) – 5:41
4. "Greasy" (Walter Davis Jr.) – 2:28
5. "Sunrise, Sunset" (Jerry Bock, Sheldon Harnick) – 2:52
6. "Steve's Blues" (Sonny Criss) – 6:23
7. "Skylark" (Hoagy Carmichael, Mercer) – 5:10
8. "Love for Sale" (Cole Porter) – 6:25 (CD bonus track)

== Personnel ==
- Sonny Criss – alto saxophone
- Walter Davis Jr. – piano
- Paul Chambers – bass
- Alan Dawson – drums
