= Reincarnation of a Lovebird =

Studio album by Charles Mingus
- Released: 1988
- Recorded: November 11, 1960
- Studios: Nola Penthouse Studios, New York City
- Genre: Jazz
- Length: 45:00
- Label: Candid
- Producer: Nat Hentoff

Charles Mingus chronology
Newport Rebels (1960)	Reincarnation of a Lovebird (1988)	Oh Yeah (1961)

Professional ratings
Review scores
Source	Rating
AllMusic	4.5/5 stars
The Penguin Guide to Jazz Recordings	3/4 stars

Reincarnation of a Lovebird is a studio album by the American jazz bassist and composer Charles Mingus, recorded in November 1960 but published posthumously in 1988.

== Background ==
The title tune was previously released and recorded in 1957.

The record was not released until 1988 due to the closure of Candid Records soon after the recordings were made. In 1988, the British record producer Alan Bates revived the label. The revival triggered the issuing of several previously unreleased recordings, including this session.

The album is not to be confused with two other Mingus releases bearing the same title. A Prestige Records double album release contains recordings from a later period. In the United Kingdom, Mingus's 1957 Atlantic Records album The Clown was retitled Reincarnation of a Lovebird for a 1960s reissue and contains the composition "Reincarnation of a Lovebird."

== Track listing ==
All compositions by Charles Mingus, except where indicated

1. "Reincarnation of a Lovebird No 2" – 6:58
2. "Wrap Your Troubles In Dreams" (Harry Barris) – 3:51
3. "R & R" – 11:51
4. "Body and Soul" (music: Johnny Green; lyrics: Edward Heyman, Robert Sour, Frank Eyton) – 13:49
5. "Bugs" – 8:29

== Personnel ==
- Charles Mingus – bass
- Lonnie Hillyer – trumpet
- Roy Eldridge – trumpet
- Charles McPherson – alto saxophone
- Eric Dolphy – flute, alto saxophone, bass clarinet
- Booker Ervin – tenor saxophone
- Jimmy Knepper – trombone
- Paul Bley – piano
- Tommy Flanagan – piano
- Dannie Richmond – drums
- Jo Jones – drums
