= Patrick Jones =

Patrick Jones may refer to:

- Patrick Jones (poet) (born 1965), Welsh poet
- Patrick Jones (author) (born 1961), librarian and author
- Patrick Jones (footballer) (born 2003), Welsh footballer
- Patrick Jones II (born 1998), American football player
- Patrick Henry Jones (1830–1900), American lawyer, public servant and postmaster of New York City
- Patrick J. Jones (fl. 1980s–2010s), Irish artist, teacher, and author
- Patrick Lloyd Jones or Lloyd Jones (1811–1886), Anglo-Irish socialist and union activist
- Patrick Stanfield Jones (f. 1990s–2010s), musician, producer, arranger and singer-songwriter

== See also ==
- Pat Jones (disambiguation)
