= Kevin Jones (musician) =

- Also known as: Bujo Kevin Jones
- Genres: Jazz
- Occupation: musician
- Instrument: percussion
- Years active: 1978–present
- Label: Motéma Music
- Website: www.kevinjonespercussion.com

Kevin Jones is an American jazz percussionist and band leader. Jones's music is influenced by that of Cuba and Congo.

== Career ==
Jones grew up in Englewood, New Jersey. He is the brother of the musician Patrick Stanfield Jones. As a teenager he studied under percussionists Babatunde Lea, Marvin "Bugalu" Smith, Congolese drummers Titos Sompa and Coster Massamba, Charli Persip and Max Roach. Jones began playing percussion professionally at the age of 13 with a group called Spoonbread, who were signed to All Platinum Records of Englewood, NJ. In 1978, aged 18, he played in a sextet led by Charles McPherson on the album Free Bop! He studied music at the University of Massachusetts and Jazzmobile simultaneously until 1979, when his Professor, saxophonist Archie Shepp, took him on tour to Europe, where he recorded his second album. Just months later he was hired by The Isley Brothers and toured and later recorded a host of records with them.

Jones has performed with, among others, Whitney Houston, The Isley Brothers, Jermaine Jackson, Archie Shepp, Winard Harper, Ray Copeland, Talib Kibwe, Babatunde Lea, James Weidman, Clifford Adams, and Malaki Ma Congo Drum and Dance Ensemble.

=== Tenth World ===
Jones and the pianist Kelvin Sholar formed the band Tenth World in 1999. The band members included Jamieo Brown (drums, percussion), Brian Horton (saxophone and flute), George Makinto (flute, percussion, African percussion), Kevin Louis (trumpet), and Luisito Quintero (timbales, percussion, drums).

Bill Milkowski writing in JazzTimes described Jones's first album as leader, Tenth World, produced by Babatunde Lea, as combining "the spirit of Africa with modern jazz on his impressive debut." Milkowski wrote of the group's second album, Live!, "Percussionist Bujo Kevin Jones underscores this vibrant sextet with an authentic Afro-Cuban pulse".

=== Who's That Lady? ===
In 2014, Jones released the album Who's That Lady? through Motéma Music. The band included singers Derrick Dupree and Christelle Durandy, pianist Zen Zadravec, drummer Jerard Snell, guitarist Michael "Moon" Reuben and Bassist Charles Brown.

In a generally positive review, "j.poet" wrote in Drum! Magazine that "Jones has a lifetime of performing a wide range of styles with some of the top names in the field, and brings all those elements together on Who's That Lady".

== Discography ==
=== As support musician ===
- Free Bop! - Charles McPherson (Xanadu Records, 1978)
- Attica Blues Big Band Live at Palais De Glace - Archie Shepp (Blue Marge Records)
- Grand Slam - The Isley Brothers (T-Neck Records/CBS, 1980)
- Wild at Woodstock The Isley Brothers Live - The Isley Brothers (T-Neck Records/CBS, 1980)
- The Beat Of Love - Randy VanWarmer - (1982)
- Inside You - The Isley Brothers (T-Neck Records/CBS, 1981)
- The Real Deal - The Isley Brothers (T-Neck Records/CBS, 1982)
- Between the Sheets - The Isley Brothers (T-Neck/CBS, 1983)
- Broadway's Closer to Sunset Blvd - Isley, Jasper, Isley (T-Neck/CBS, 1984)
- Caravan of Love - Isley, Jasper, Isley (T-Neck/CBS, 1985)
- Different Drummer - Isley, Jasper, Isley (T-Neck/CBS, 1987)
- Soul-Jazz Collaboration - Chuck McPherson (Independent, 1998)
- Listening Room - Clifford Adams (2000)
- Spiritually Speaking Blaze (featuring Kevin Hedge/Josh Milan) (2002)
- Soul Pools - Babatunde Lea (Motema Music 2003)
- Rhythm Master - Vincent Ector (Blues Leaf, 2003)
- Time For The Soul - Winard Harper Sextet (Savant Records, 2003)
- Keepers Of The Flame - Charles Earland Tribute Band (Highnote, 2003)
- Hip Cake Walk - Papa John DeFrancesco (Highnote, 2003)
- Be Thankful - Omar featuring Angie Stone (2004)
- Suite Unseen: Summoner Of The Ghost - Babatunde Lea (Motema Music, 2005)
- Make It Happen - Winard Harper Sextet (Savant Records, 2006)
- Synthesis - Norman Simmons (Savant Records, 2002)
- Percussion Madness - Luisito Quintero (Vega Records, 2006)
- Follow the North Star – T.K. Blue (JAJA Records, 2008)
- Aftershower Funk - The Fantastic Souls (Kay Dee Records, 2010)
- Soul To The People - The Fantastic Souls (Kay Dee Records, 2010)

=== As band leader ===
- SunRize - Sunrize (Boardwalk Records 1981)
- Land Of Eternal Tranquil Light (Tenth World Music 2000)
- Tenth World (Motéma Music, 2005)
- Live! (Motéma Music, 2008.
- "Who's That Lady" (Motema Music 2014)
- "In This Moment" (Tenth World, Kevin Jones Music, 2023)
