= Beautiful! =

Studio album by Charles McPherson
- Released: 1975
- Recorded: August 12, 1975; New York City
- Genre: Jazz
- Label: Xanadu; 15
- Producer: Don Schlitten

Charles McPherson chronology
Today's Man (1973)	Beautiful! (1975)	Live in Tokyo (1976)

Beautiful! is an album by Charles McPherson which was recorded in 1975 and released on the Xanadu label.

== Reception ==
Professional ratings
Review scores
Source	Rating
Allmusic	4/5 stars
The Rolling Stone Jazz Record Guide	4/5 stars

The Allmusic review recommended the album awarding it 4 stars and stating "Xanadu was a perfect label for altoist Charles McPherson since he was always a bop-based improviser who was perfectly at home jamming straightahead standards".

== Track listing ==
1. "They Say It's Wonderful" (Irving Berlin) - 4:59
2. "But Beautiful" (Johnny Burke, Jimmy Van Heusen) - 6:18
3. "It Could Happen to You" (Burke, Van Heusen) - 5:43
4. "Lover" (Lorenz Hart, Richard Rodgers) - 4:49
5. "This Can't Be Love" (Hart, Rodgers) - 5:28
6. "Body and Soul" (Frank Eyton, Johnny Green, Edward Heyman, Robert Sour) - 7:44
7. "It Had to Be You" (Isham Jones, Gus Kahn) - 5:42
8. "All God's Chillun Got Rhythm" (Walter Jurmann, Gus Kahn, Bronisław Kaper) - 8:59 Bonus track on CD reissue

== Personnel ==
- Charles McPherson - alto saxophone
- Duke Jordan - piano
- Sam Jones - bass
- Leroy Williams - drums
