= Lonnie Hillyer =

American jazz trumpeter (1940–1985)

- Born: March 25, 1940; Monroe, Georgia, U.S.
- Died: July 1, 1985 (aged 45) New York City, U.S.
- Genre: Jazz
- Occupation: Musician
- Instrument: Trumpet
- Years active: 1960–1980s

Lonnie Hillyer (March 25, 1940 in Monroe, Georgia – July 1, 1985 in New York City) was an American jazz trumpeter, strongly influenced by Dizzy Gillespie, Charlie Parker, Thelonious Monk, and other prominent bebop-era musicians.

At the age of three, Hillyer moved with his family to Detroit, where he began studying music at age 14 under Barry Harris. In 1960, he moved to New York City, where he played with Charles Mingus, Yusef Lateef, and Clifford Jarvis. Hillyer's association with Mingus lasted over a decade, and he performed on records such as My Favorite Quintet (1966) and Let My Children Hear Music (1972).

In 1966, he and Charles McPherson, who had grown up with Hillyer in Detroit, formed a quintet and performed together during the years following. Around 1983, he and the former Monk tenor saxophonist Charles Rouse formed a jazz quintet (named Bebop Quintessence), with drummer Leroy Williams, pianist Hugh Lawson, and bassist Ben Brown.

Hillyer performed live with many leading musicians, including Thelonious Monk, Art Blakey, Philly Joe Jones, Willie Bobo, Barry Harris, Walter Davis Jr., Abbey Lincoln, and others.

He died of cancer in July 1985.

His son, Lonnie D. Hillyer, is a rock bassist (performing with J. Walter Negro & The Loose Jointz, Maggie's Dream, Billy Joel, Gordon Gano, Bernie Worrell, and Andrea Álvarez).

== Discography ==
=== As sideman ===
With Eric Dolphy

- Candid Dolphy (Candid, 1960)

With Barry Harris

- Newer Than New (Riverside, 1961)

With Yusef Lateef

- Cry! – Tender (New Jazz, 1959)

With Charles McPherson

- The Quintet/Live! (Prestige, 1966)
- Charles McPherson (Mainstream, 1971)

With Charles Mingus

- Reincarnation of a Lovebird (Candid, 1960)
- The Complete Town Hall Concert (Blue Note, 1962 [1994])
- Mingus at Monterey (Jazz Workshop, 1964)
- My Favorite Quintet (Jazz Workshop, 1965)
- Music Written for Monterey 1965 (Jazz Workshop, 1965)
- Let My Children Hear Music (Columbia, 1971)
- Charles Mingus and Friends in Concert (Columbia, 1972)

With Pharoah Sanders

- Oh! Pharoah Speak (Trip, 1971) – as the Latin Jazz Quintet
