= Home Is Where the Soul Is =

Home Is Where The Soul Is

Studio album by Kenny Drew
- Released: 1978
- Recorded: October 15, 1978 in L.A.
- Genre: Jazz
- Label: Xanadu
- Producer: Don Schlitten

Kenny Drew chronology
Serenity (1978)	Home Is Where The Soul Is (1978)	For Sure! (1978)

Home Is Where The Soul Is is a jazz album by pianist Kenny Drew, recorded in 1978 for Xanadu Records.

== Reception ==
The Allmusic review by Scott Yanow states "The years overseas had not hurt the pianist in the least and he had clearly grown as an improviser. Worth searching for".

Professional ratings
Review scores
Source	Rating
Allmusic	3/5 stars
The Rolling Stone Jazz Record Guide	3/5 stars

== Track listing ==
All compositions by Kenny Drew except as indicated

1. "Work Song" (Nat Adderley) - 5:59
2. "Prelude to a Kiss" (Duke Ellington, Irving Mills) - 7:15
3. "West of Eden" (Austin Wells) - 5:18
4. "It Could Happen to You" (Jimmy Van Heusen, Johnny Burke) - 4:34
5. "Only You" - 3:49
6. "Three and Four Blues" - 6:23
7. "Ending" - 6:10
8. "Yesterdays" - 5:40

== Personnel ==
- Kenny Drew - piano
- Leroy Vinnegar - bass guitar
- Frank Butler - drums
