= Up, Up and Away (Sonny Criss album) =

Studio album by Sonny Criss
- Released: 1967
- Recorded: August 18, 1967
- Studio: Impact Studios, New York City
- Genre: Jazz
- Length: 37:08
- Label: Prestige; 7530
- Producer: Don Schlitten

Sonny Criss chronology
Portrait of Sonny Criss (1967)	Up, Up and Away (1967)	The Beat Goes On! (1968)

Up, Up and Away is an album by saxophonist Sonny Criss recorded in 1967 and released on the Prestige label.

== Reception ==
Professional ratings
Review scores
Source	Rating
AllMusic	4/5 stars
The Penguin Guide to Jazz Recordings	3/4 stars

AllMusic awarded the album 4 stars with its review by Scott Yanow stating, "Sonny Criss' Prestige recordings of the late 1960s generally included a current pop tune or two along with some stronger jazz pieces. This 1998 CD reissue is of particular interest because the intense altoist is teamed with guitarist Tal Farlow... So overall this CD is more rewarding than it might appear at first glance".

== Track listing ==
1. "Up, Up and Away" (Jimmy Webb) – 5:32
2. "Willow Weep for Me" (Ann Ronell) – 5:12
3. "This is for Benny" (Horace Tapscott) – 6:23
4. "Sunny" (Bobby Hebb) – 5:55
5. "Scrapple from the Apple" (Charlie Parker) – 6:47
6. "Paris Blues" (Sonny Criss) – 7:29

== Personnel ==
- Sonny Criss – alto saxophone
- Cedar Walton – piano
- Tal Farlow – guitar
- Bob Cranshaw – bass
- Lenny McBrowne – drums
