= Horizons (Charles McPherson album) =

Studio album by Charles McPherson
- Released: 1969
- Recorded: August 27, 1968; Impact Studios, New York City
- Genre: Jazz
- Length: 38:17
- Label: Prestige; PR 7603
- Producer: Don Schlitten

Charles McPherson chronology
From This Moment On! (1968)	Horizons (1969)	McPherson's Mood (1968)

Horizons is the fifth album led by saxophonist Charles McPherson recorded in 1968 and released on the Prestige label.

== Reception ==
Professional ratings
Review scores
Source	Rating
Allmusic	3/5 stars
The Penguin Guide to Jazz Recordings	3/4 stars

Allmusic awarded the album 3 stars with its review by Scott Yanow stating, "By playing bop-oriented music in 1968, Charles McPherson could have been considered behind the times, but he was never a fad chaser and he has long had a timeless style. This music still sounds viable and creative decades later".

== Track listing ==
All compositions by Charles McPherson except as indicated

1. "Horizons" - 5:47
2. "Lush Life" (Billy Strayhorn) - 8:04
3. "Ain't That Somethin'" - 5:18
4. "Night Eyes" - 5:14
5. "I Should Care" (Sammy Cahn, Axel Stordahl, Paul Weston) - 6:38
6. "She Loves Me" - 7:16

== Personnel ==
- Charles McPherson - alto saxophone
- Nasir Rashid Hafiz - vibraphone
- Cedar Walton - piano
- Pat Martino - guitar
- Walter Booker - bass
- Billy Higgins - drums
