= California Hard =

Studio album by Dolo Coker
- Released: 1977
- Recorded: December 27, 1976
- Genre: Hard bop
- Label: Xanadu
- Producer: Don Schlitten

Dolo Coker chronology
| Dolo! (1976) | California Hard (1977) | Third Down (1977) |

California Hard is a jazz album by pianist and composer Dolo Coker, recorded in 1976. Two of the six pieces were written by Coker. The album was reissued as a CD in 1994, with one bonus track (a solo piano version of "Round Midnight").

== Reception ==
Professional ratings
Review scores
| Source | Rating |
|---|---|
| AllMusic | 3/5 stars |

AllMusic reviewer Scott Yanow called the album "a strong effort."

== Track listing ==
1. "Jumping Jacks" (Coker) – 4:03
2. "Gone with the Wind" (Herb Magidson, Allie Wrubel) – 4:26
3. "Roots 4FB" (Mitchell) - 14:58
4. "Mr. Yohe" (Pepper) - 6:23
5. "Gone Again" (Gladys Hampton, Curtis Lewis, Curley Hamner) - 8:08
6. "Tale of Two Cities" (Coker) - 6:28
7. "'Round Midnight" (Thelonious Monk) (on CD reissue only; not on original LP) - 2:27

== Personnel ==
Recorded on December 27, 1976.

- Dolo Coker - piano
- Blue Mitchell - trumpet, flugelhorn
- Art Pepper - alto saxophone, tenor saxophone
- Leroy Vinnegar - bass guitar
- Frank Butler - drums
