= Portrait of Sonny Criss =

Studio album by Sonny Criss
- Released: 1967
- Recorded: March 23, 1967
- Studio: Van Gelder Studios, Englewood Cliffs, New Jersey
- Genre: Jazz
- Length: 31:04
- Label: Prestige; 7526
- Producer: Don Schlitten

Sonny Criss chronology
This is Criss! (1966)	Portrait of Sonny Criss (1967)	Up, Up and Away (1967)

Portrait of Sonny Criss is an album by saxophonist Sonny Criss recorded in 1967 and released on the Prestige label.

== Reception ==
Professional ratings
Review scores
Source	Rating
AllMusic	4/5 stars
The Penguin Guide to Jazz Recordings	4/4 stars

AllMusic awarded the album 4 stars with its review by Scott Yanow calling it "An excellent outing".

== Track listing ==
1. "A Million or More Times" (Walter Davis, Jr.) – 4:25
2. "Wee" (Denzil Best) – 4:32
3. "God Bless the Child" (Billie Holiday, Arthur Herzog, Jr.) – 6:30
4. "On a Clear Day" (Burton Lane, Alan Jay Lerner) – 6:21
5. "Blues in the Closet" (Oscar Pettiford) – 5:14
6. "Smile" (Charlie Chaplin) – 4:39

== Personnel ==
- Sonny Criss – alto saxophone
- Walter Davis, Jr. – piano
- Paul Chambers – bass
- Alan Dawson – drums
