= Sonny's Dream (Birth of the New Cool) =

Studio album by Sonny Criss
- Released: 1968
- Recorded: May 8, 1968; Los Angeles, California
- Genre: Jazz, big band
- Length: 44:56
- Label: Prestige; PR 7576
- Producer: Don Schlitten

Sonny Criss chronology
The Beat Goes On! (1968)	Sonny's Dream (Birth of the New Cool) (1968)	Rockin' in Rhythm (1968)

Sonny's Dream (Birth of the New Cool) is an album by saxophonist Sonny Criss recorded in 1968 and released on the Prestige label.

== Reception ==
Professional ratings
Review scores
Source	Rating
AllMusic	4/5 stars
Penguin Guide to Jazz	(Core Collection)

AllMusic awarded the album 4 stars with its review by Scott Yanow stating, "The altoist is backed for the set by a nonet arranged by the great Los Angeles legend Horace Tapscott. The arrangements are challenging but complementary to Criss' style, and he is in top form on the six Tapscott originals... highly recommended for both Criss' playing and Tapscott's writing". The Penguin Guide to Jazz identified it as part of their recommended "core collection".

== Track listing ==
All compositions by Horace Tapscott

1. "Sonny's Dream" – 7:33
2. "Ballad for Samuel" – 4:22
3. "The Black Apostles" – 5:52
4. "The Golden Pearl" – 5:10
5. "Daughter of Cochise" – 7:34
6. "Sandy and Niles" – 5:26
7. "The Golden Pearl" [alternate take] – 5:06 Bonus track on CD reissue
8. "Sonny's Dream" [alternate take] – 4:21 Bonus track on CD reissue

== Personnel ==
- Sonny Criss – alto saxophone, soprano saxophone
- Conte Candoli – trumpet
- Dick Nash – trombone
- Ray Draper – tuba
- David Sherr – alto saxophone
- Teddy Edwards – tenor saxophone
- Pete Christlieb – baritone saxophone
- Tommy Flanagan – piano
- Al McKibbon – bass
- Everett Brown Jr. – drums
- Horace Tapscott – arranger, conductor
