= Saturday Morning (album) =

Studio album by Sonny Criss
- Released: 1975
- Recorded: March 1, 1975
- Genre: Jazz
- Label: Xanadu
- Producer: Don Schlitten

Sonny Criss chronology
| Crisscraft (1975) | Saturday Morning (1975) | Out of Nowhere (1976) |

Saturday Morning is a slow bluesy jazz album by alto saxophonist Sonny Criss, recorded on March 1, 1975, for Xanadu Records.

== Reception ==
Professional ratings
Review scores
| Source | Rating |
|---|---|
| AllMusic | 4.5/5 stars |
| The Penguin Guide to Jazz Recordings | 3.5/4 stars |

AllMusic awarded the album 4½ stars with its review by Scott Yanow stating "Criss, an underrated altoist who was instantly recognizable within three notes, was neglected during long portions of his career but he did leave behind several memorable recordings, such as this one. Recommended."

== Track listing ==
All compositions by Sonny Criss except as indicated

1. "Angel Eyes" (Earl Brent, Matt Dennis) – 5:29
2. "Tin Tin Deo" (Gil Fuller, Chano Pozo) – 6:44
3. "Jeannie's Knees" – 5:08
4. "Saturday Morning" – 5:01
5. "My Heart Stood Still" (Lorenz Hart, Richard Rodgers) – 6:46
6. "Until the Real Thing Comes Along" (Sammy Cahn, Saul Chaplin, L.E. Freeman) – 5:44
7. "Confusion" (Barry Harris) – 4:05

== Personnel ==
- Sonny Criss – alto saxophone
- Barry Harris – piano
- Leroy Vinnegar – bass
- Lenny McBrowne – drums
