= Siku Ya Bibi (Day of the Lady) =

Studio album by Charles McPherson
- Released: 1972
- Recorded: 1972; New York City
- Genre: Jazz
- Label: Mainstream; MRL 329
- Producer: Bob Shad

Charles McPherson chronology
Charles McPherson (1971)	Siku Ya Bibi (Day of the Lady) (1972)	Today's Man (1973)

Siku Ya Bibi (Day of the Lady) is an album by saxophonist Charles McPherson, dedicated to Billie Holiday, which was recorded in 1972 and released on the Mainstream label.

== Reception ==
Professional ratings
Review scores
Source	Rating
AllMusic	4/5 stars

Scott Yanow, writing for AllMusic, awarded the album 4 stars, stating: "Although not quite up to the level of his upcoming, more freewheeling Xanadu sessions, this is a fine outing". Dan Morgenstern, writing for DownBeat, called the album "some of McPherson's most moving playing on record" and noted that McPherson "creates naturally flowing and musical phrases that are a joy to the ear."

== Track listing ==
1. "Don't Explain" (Billie Holiday, Arthur Herzog, Jr.) - 4:22
2. "Lover Man (Oh, Where Can You Be?)" (Jimmy Davis, Ram Ramirez) - 4:52
3. "God Bless the Child" (Holiday, Herzog) 4:24
4. "Miss Brown to You" (Richard A. Whiting, Ralph Rainger, Leo Robin) - 4:38
5. "Good Morning Heartache" (Ervin Drake, Dan Fisher, Irene Higginbotham) - 4:24
6. "For Heaven's Sake" (Elise Bretton, Sherman Edwards, Donald Meyer) - 4:57
7. "I'm a Fool to Want You" (Frank Sinatra, Jack Wolf, Joel Herron) - 4:37
8. "Lover, Come Back to Me" (Sigmund Romberg, Oscar Hammerstein II) - 6:56

== Personnel ==
- Charles McPherson - alto saxophone
- Ted Dunbar - guitar (tracks 1, 3, 5 & 7)
- Barry Harris - piano
- Sam Jones - bass
- Leroy Williams - drums
- Selwart Clarke, Max Ellen, Emanuel Green, Joe Malin, David Nadien, Gene Orloff - violin (tracks 1, 3, 5 & 7)
- Julien Barber, Alfred Brown - viola (tracks 1, 3, 5 & 7)
- Kermit Moore, Alan Shulman - cello (tracks 1, 3, 5 & 7)
- Ernie Wilkins - conductor, arranger (tracks 1, 3, 5 & 7)
