= All Alone (Dolo Coker album) =

Studio album by Dolo Coker
- Released: 1981
- Recorded: November 28, 1979, New York City
- Genre: Jazz
- Label: Xanadu; 178
- Producer: Don Schlitten

Dolo Coker chronology
Third Down (1977)	All Alone (1981)	Xanadu in Africa (1980)

All Alone is a solo piano album by Dolo Coker which was recorded in 1979 and released on the Xanadu label in 1981.

== Reception ==
Professional ratings
Review scores
Source	Rating
AllMusic	3/5 stars

AllMusic reviewer Scott Yanow states, "Dolo Coker's fourth and final album as a leader is a set of unaccompanied piano solos with the emphasis on reflective ballads (although there are also a couple of swinging tunes)".

== Track listing ==
All compositions by Dolo Coker except as indicated

1. "Reflections" - 5:54
2. "Sine and Cosine" - 2:15
3. "Just You" - 4:36
4. "Cabin in the Sky" (Vernon Duke, John La Touche) - 5:38
5. "All Alone" - 4:12
6. "The Things You Never Said" - 4:59
7. "Spectrum" - 3:24
8. "Try a Little Tenderness" (Jimmy Campbell, Reg Connelly, Harry M. Woods) - 5:53

== Personnel ==
- Dolo Coker - piano
