= Live in Tokyo (Jimmy Raney album) =

Live album by Jimmy Raney
- Released: 1976
- Recorded: April 12 & 14, 1976; Yubin Chokin Hall and Nakano Sun Plaza Hall, Tokyo, Japan
- Genre: Jazz
- Label: Xanadu; 132
- Producer: Don Schlitten

Jimmy Raney chronology
| The Influence (1975) | Live in Tokyo (1976) | Solo (1976) |

Live in Tokyo is a live album by guitarist Jimmy Raney which was recorded in Japan in 1976 and released on the Xanadu label.

== Reception ==
Professional ratings
Review scores
| Source | Rating |
|---|---|
| Allmusic | 4/5 stars |

The Allmusic review awarded the album 4 stars stating "The boppish performances (which Raney considers among his very best) are subtle with lots of interplay between the players".

== Track listing ==
1. "How About You?" (Burton Lane, Ralph Freed) - 5:22
2. "Darn That Dream" (Jimmy Van Heusen, Eddie DeLange) - 4:53
3. "Anthropology" (Charlie Parker, Dizzy Gillespie) - 3:58
4. "Watch What Happens" (Michel Legrand) - 3:36
5. "Autumn Leaves" (Joseph Kosma, Jacques Prévert, Johnny Mercer) - 4:05
6. "Stella by Starlight" (Victor Young, Ned Washington) - 3:35
7. "Here's That Rainy Day" (Van Heusen, Burke) - 4:53
8. "Cherokee" (Ray Noble) - 4:49

Bonus tracks on 1988 reissue The Complete Jimmy Raney in Tokyo (EPM Musique – FDC 5157, Xanadu Records – FDC 5157)

- "Just Friends" (John Klenner and Sam M. Lewis) - 4:23
- "Groovin' High" (Dizzy Gillespie) - 7:46
- "Blue 'n' Boogie (Dizzy Gillespie and Frank Paparelli) - 7:32

== Personnel ==
- Jimmy Raney - guitar
- Sam Jones - bass
- Leroy Williams - drums
