= In Tandem =

Live album by Kenny Barron & Ted Dunbar
- Released: 1980
- Recorded: February 15, 1975
- Venue: Livingston Campus of Rutgers University, NJ
- Genre: Jazz
- Length: 50:02
- Label: Muse
- Producer: Michael Cuscuna, Kenny Barron and Ted Dunbar

Kenny Barron chronology
Peruvian Blue (1974)	In Tandem (1980)	Lucifer (1975)

Ted Dunbar chronology
In Tandem (1975)	Opening Remarks (1978)

In Tandem is a live album by American pianist Kenny Barron and guitarist Ted Dunbar which was recorded in 1975 and first released on the Muse label in 1980.

== Reception ==
Professional ratings
Review scores
Source	Rating
Allmusic	3/5 stars

In his review on Allmusic, Ken Dryden notes "This duo concert by pianist Kenny Barron and guitarist Ted Dunbar is excerpted from a 1975 concert at Rutgers University, where both of them were teaching at the time. Barron and Dunbar (who made a number of recordings, but very few as a leader or co-leader) mesh very well together ... The duo tracks are long but never run out of gas ... There are also solo features for each man."

== Track listing ==
1. "Summertime" (George Gershwin, Ira Gershwin, DuBose Heyward) – 14:55
2. "Here's That Rainy Day' (Jimmy Van Heusen, Johnny Burke) – 10:07
3. "Aruba" (Kenny Barron, Ted Dunbar) – 18:10
4. "On the Trail" (Ferde Grofé) – 6:50

== Personnel ==
- Kenny Barron – piano (tracks 1–3)
- Ted Dunbar – guitar (tracks 1, 3 & 4)
