= New Horizons (Charles McPherson album) =

Studio album by Charles McPherson
- Released: 1978
- Recorded: September 28, 1977; RCA Studios, New York City
- Genre: Jazz
- Label: Xanadu; 149
- Producer: Don Schlitten

Charles McPherson chronology
| Live in Tokyo (1976) | New Horizons (1978) | Free Bop! (1978) |

New Horizons is an album by saxophonist Charles McPherson which was recorded in 1977 and released on the Xanadu label.

== Reception ==
Professional ratings
Review scores
| Source | Rating |
|---|---|
| Allmusic | 4/5 stars |
| The Rolling Stone Jazz Record Guide | 3/5 stars |

The Allmusic review awarded the album 4 stars stating "The music is typically swinging and has its exciting moments".

== Track listing ==
All compositions by Charles McPherson except as indicated

1. "Promise" - 5:02
2. "I'll Never Stop Loving You" (Nicholas Brodszky, Sammy Cahn) - 4:17
3. "Night Eyes" - 9:38
4. "Horizons" - 5:19
5. "Samba de Orfeu" (Luiz Bonfá, Antonio María) - 6:56
6. "Dee Blues" - 8:13

== Personnel ==
- Charles McPherson - alto saxophone
- Mickey Tucker - piano
- Cecil McBee - bass
- Freddie Waits - drums
