= Bebop Revisited! =

Studio album by Charles McPherson
- Released: 1964
- Recorded: November 20, 1964
- Studio: Van Gelder Studio, Englewood Cliffs, New Jersey
- Genre: Jazz
- Length: 45:52
- Label: Prestige; PR 7359
- Producer: Don Schlitten

Charles McPherson chronology
Bebop Revisited! (1964)	Con Alma! (1965)

Bebop Revisited!, is the debut album led by American jazz alto saxophonist Charles McPherson recorded in 1964 and released on the Prestige label.

== Reception ==
Professional ratings
Review scores
Source	Rating
Allmusic	4.5/5 stars
The Rolling Stone Jazz Record Guide	3/5 stars
The Penguin Guide to Jazz Recordings	3/4 stars

Allmusic awarded the album 4½ stars with its review by Scott Yanow stating, "McPherson and Jones make for a potent frontline on these spirited performances, easily recommended to fans of straightahead jazz".

== Track listing ==
1. "Hot House" (Tadd Dameron) – 7:43
2. "Nostalgia" (Fats Navarro) – 5:24
3. "Variations on a Blues by Bird" (Charlie Parker) – 6:55
4. "Wail" (Bud Powell) – 6:04
5. "Embraceable You" (George Gershwin, Ira Gershwin) – 7:39
6. "Si Si" (Parker) – 5:50
7. "If I Loved You" (Oscar Hammerstein II, Richard Rodgers) – 6:17 Bonus track on CD reissue

== Personnel ==
- Charles McPherson – alto saxophone
- Carmell Jones – trumpet
- Barry Harris – piano
- Nelson Boyd – bass
- Albert Heath – drums
