= Rockin' in Rhythm (Sonny Criss album) =

Studio album by Sonny Criss
- Released: 1969
- Recorded: July 2, 1968; New York City
- Genre: Jazz
- Length: 39:02
- Label: Prestige; 7610
- Producer: Don Schlitten

Sonny Criss chronology
Sonny's Dream (Birth of the New Cool) (1968)	Rockin' in Rhythm (1969)	I'll Catch the Sun! (1969)

Rockin' in Rhythm is a jazz album by alto saxophonist Sonny Criss recorded in 1968 and released on the Prestige label.

== Reception ==
Professional ratings
Review scores
Source	Rating
AllMusic	4/5 stars
The Penguin Guide to Jazz Recordings	3/4 stars

AllMusic awarded the album 4 stars with its review by Jim Todd stating, "This highly compatible group of like-minded masters is well-served by a recording that puts the listener in the middle of their tight-knit sound... Anyone hearing Criss for the first time via this CD will feel compelled to dig deeper into his discography."

== Track listing ==
1. "Eleanor Rigby" (John Lennon, Paul McCartney) – 5:32
2. "When the Sun Comes Out" (Harold Arlen, Ted Koehler) – 6:31
3. "Sonnymoon for Two" (Sonny Rollins) – 4:50
4. "Rockin' in Rhythm" (Harry Carney, Duke Ellington, Irving Mills) – 4:37
5. "Misty Roses" (Tim Hardin) – 5:53
6. "(I'm Afraid) The Masquerade Is Over" (Herb Magidson, Allie Wrubel) – 5:47
7. "All the Things You Are" (Oscar Hammerstein II, Jerome Kern) – 5:52 Bonus track on CD reissue

== Personnel ==
- Sonny Criss – alto saxophone
- Eddie Green – piano
- Bob Cranshaw – bass
- Alan Dawson – drums
