= From This Moment On =

From This Moment On may refer to:

- "From This Moment On" (Cole Porter song) (1950)
- "From This Moment On", a 1968 single by Bonnie Guitar from her album Leaves Are the Tears of Autumn
- From This Moment On!, a 1968 album by jazz saxophonist Charles McPherson
- From This Moment On, a 1975 album by George Morgan, or its title song
- From This Moment On, a 1990 one-woman show by Sally Ann Howes
- "From This Moment On" (Shania Twain song) (1997)
- From This Moment On, a 2002 romance novel by Lynn Kurland
- From This Moment On (album), a 2007 album by Diana Krall
