= Mingus at Monterey =

Live album by Charles Mingus
- Released: 1965
- Recorded: September 20, 1964
- Genre: Jazz
- Length: 60:24
- Label: Jazz Workshop JWS 001/002

Charles Mingus chronology
Right Now: Live at the Jazz Workshop (1964)	Mingus at Monterey (1965)	My Favorite Quintet (1965)

Alternate Cover

Mingus at Monterey is a live album by the jazz bassist and composer Charles Mingus, recorded in 1964 at the Monterey Jazz Festival and originally released on Mingus's short-lived mail-order Jazz Workshop label but subsequently released on other labels.

== Reception ==
The AllMusic review by Scott Yanow stated, "One of the highpoints of Charles Mingus's career was his appearance at the 1964 Monterey Jazz Festival... it showcases the bassist/composer/bandleader at the peak of his powers".

Professional ratings
Review scores
Source	Rating
AllMusic	4.5/5 stars
Down Beat	4.5/5 stars
The Rolling Stone Jazz Record Guide	4/5 stars

In June 2026, CBS News included three songs in the album: "Sophisticated Lady," "Take the 'A' Train," "Orange Was The Color Of Her Dress, Then Blue Silk," in its list of the 250 essential American songs of the past 250 years.

== Track listing ==
All compositions by Charles Mingus except as indicated

1. "Duke Ellington Medley: I've Got It Bad" (Duke Ellington) - 4:14
2. "Duke Ellington Medley: In a Sentimental Mood" (Ellington) - 1:46
3. "Duke Ellington Medley: All Too Soon" (Ellington) - 1:53
4. "Duke Ellington Medley: Mood Indigo" (Ellington) - 0:59
5. "Duke Ellington Medley: Sophisticated Lady" (Ellington) - 1:46
6. "Duke Ellington Medley: A Train" (Billy Strayhorn) - 13:54
7. "Orange Was the Color of Her Dress, Then Blue Silk" - 13:04
8. "Meditations on Integration" - 22:48

- Recorded at the Monterey Jazz Festival in California on September 20, 1964

Originally issued as double LP. "Meditations on Integration"'s concluding side appears on verso of the first side to accommodate the drop-down LP players of the 1960s that would allow automatic play of one record after an initial record would run. Original sequence of composition performances:

=== Side 1A ===
1. "Duke Ellington Medley: I've Got It Bad" (Duke Ellington)
2. "Duke Ellington Medley: In a Sentimental Mood" (Ellington)
3. "Duke Ellington Medley: All Too Soon" (Ellington)
4. "Duke Ellington Medley: Mood Indigo" (Ellington)
5. "Duke Ellington Medley: Sophisticated Lady" (Ellington)
6. "Duke Ellington Medley: A Train" (Billy Strayhorn) (Part I)

=== Side 1B ===
1. "Meditations on Integration" (Part II)

=== Side 2A ===
1. "Take the "A" Train" (Part II)
2. "Orange Was the Color of Her Dress, Then Blue Silk" (Part I)

=== Side 2B ===
1. "Orange Was the Color of Her Dress, Then Blue Silk" (Part II)
2. "Meditations on Integration" (Part I)

== Personnel ==
- Charles Mingus - bass, piano
- Lonnie Hillyer - trumpet
- Charles McPherson - alto saxophone
- Jaki Byard - piano
- Dannie Richmond - drums
- Bobby Bryant, Melvin Moore - trumpet (track 8)
- Lou Blackburn - trombone (track 8)
- Red Callender - tuba (track 8)
- Buddy Collette - flute, piccolo, alto saxophone (track 8)
- Jack Nimitz - bass clarinet, baritone saxophone (track 8)
- John Handy - tenor saxophone (tracks 6 & 8)
