= I'll Catch the Sun! =

Studio album by Sonny Criss
- Released: 1969
- Recorded: January 20, 1969; RCA Studios, Los Angeles, California
- Genre: Jazz
- Length: 34:35
- Label: Prestige; 7628
- Producer: Don Schlitten

Sonny Criss chronology
Rockin' in Rhythm (1968)	I'll Catch the Sun! (1969)	Crisscraft (1975)

I'll Catch the Sun! is a jazz album by alto saxophonist Sonny Criss, recorded in 1969 and released on the Prestige label.

== Reception ==
Professional ratings
Review scores
Source	Rating
AllMusic	4/5 stars
The Penguin Guide to Jazz Recordings	3.5/4 stars

AllMusic awarded the album 4 stars with its review by Scott Yanow calling it "often excellent".

== Track listing ==
All tracks composed by Criss unless otherwise stated

1. "Don't Rain on My Parade" (Bob Merrill, Jule Styne) – 4:24
2. "Blue Sunset" – 8:10
3. "I Thought About You" (Jimmy Van Heusen, Johnny Mercer) – 4:43
4. "California Screamin'" – 6:03
5. "Cry Me a River" (Arthur Hamilton) – 5:41
6. "I'll Catch the Sun" (Rod McKuen) – 5:34

== Personnel ==
- Sonny Criss – alto saxophone
- Hampton Hawes – piano
- Monty Budwig – bass
- Shelly Manne – drums
