= The Quintet/Live! =

Live album by Charles McPherson
- Released: 1967
- Recorded: October 13, 1966; Five Spot, New York City
- Genre: Jazz
- Length: 75:18
- Label: Prestige; PR 7480
- Producer: Don Schlitten

Charles McPherson chronology
| Con Alma! (1965) | The Quintet/Live! (1967) | From This Moment On! (1968) |

The Quintet/Live! is a live album led by saxophonist Charles McPherson recorded in 1966 at the Five Spot Café and released on the Prestige label. The album was released as an expanded CD with bonus tracks in 1995 as Live at the Five Spot.

== Reception ==
Professional ratings
Review scores
| Source | Rating |
|---|---|
| AllMusic | 4/5 stars |
| The Rolling Stone Jazz Record Guide | 3/5 stars |
| The Penguin Guide to Jazz Recordings | 3/4 stars |

AllMusic awarded the album 4 stars with its review by Scott Yanow stating, "McPherson is a commanding performer, with a penetrating tone and an ability to explore a song for subtler possibilities".

== Track listing ==
1. "The Viper" (Charles McPherson) – 4:22
2. "I Can't Get Started" (Vernon Duke, Ira Gershwin) – 9:10
3. "Shaw 'Nuff" (Ray Brown, Gil Fuller, Dizzy Gillespie) – 10:24
4. "Here's That Rainy Day" (Johnny Burke, Jimmy Van Heusen) – 6:35
5. "Never Let Me Go" (Ray Evans, Jay Livingston) – 11:35
6. "Suddenly" (McPherson) – 6:50
7. "I Believe in You" (Frank Loesser) – 8:13 Bonus track on CD reissue
8. "Epistrophy" (Kenny Clarke, Thelonious Monk) – 7:28 Bonus track on CD reissue
9. "Luminescence" (Barry Harris) – 10:41 Bonus track on CD reissue

== Personnel ==
- Charles McPherson – alto saxophone
- Lonnie Hillyer – trumpet
- Barry Harris – piano
- Raymond McKinney – bass
- Billy Higgins – drums
