= Free Bop! =

Studio album by Charles McPherson
- Released: 1979
- Recorded: October 23, 1978; Los Angeles, CA
- Genre: Jazz
- Label: Xanadu; 170
- Producer: Don Schlitten

Charles McPherson chronology
New Horizons (1977)	Free Bop! (1979)	The Prophet (1978)

Free Bop! is an album by saxophonist Charles McPherson which was recorded in 1978 and released on the Xanadu label.

== Reception ==
Professional ratings
Review scores
Source	Rating
Allmusic	4.5/5 stars
The Rolling Stone Jazz Record Guide	3/5 stars

The Allmusic review awarded the album 4½ stars stating "This is perhaps his fiercest, most exciting playing as a leader".

== Track listing ==
All compositions by Charles McPherson except as indicated

1. "A Day in Rio - 10:42"
2. "Come Sunday" (Duke Ellington) - 5:08
3. "Chuck-A-Luck" - 4:48
4. "Estrellita (Vito Picone, Arthur Venosa) - 6:19
5. "Si Si" (Charlie Parker) - 7:28
6. "Free Bop" - 5:29

== Personnel ==
- Charles McPherson - alto saxophone, tenor saxophone
- Peter Sprague - guitar
- Lou Levy - piano
- Monty Budwig - bass
- Chuck McPherson - drums
- Kevin Jones - congas, percussion
