= Michael Weiss (pianist) =

American jazz musician (born 1958)

Michael Weiss (born 1958), is a jazz pianist and composer best known for his fifteen-year association with saxophonist Johnny Griffin.

Weiss was born in Dallas, Texas. After completing a bachelor of music degree from Indiana University School of Music in 1981, Weiss moved to New York City in 1982. He toured that year with singer Jon Hendricks. He has worked with George Coleman, Art Farmer, Johnny Griffin, Slide Hampton, Tom Harrell, Jimmy Heath, Charles McPherson, and Gerry Mulligan.

In 2000 he was the grand prize winner in the BMI/Thelonious Monk Institute's Composers Competition. In 1989, he won second prize in the Thelonious Monk International Jazz Piano Competition, and in 2002, he received a composition commission from Chamber Music America.

As a soloist and bandleader, Weiss has been featured on the television and radio programs CBS News Nightwatch, Live from Lincoln Center, Jazzset, Piano Jazz, and the Jazz Piano Christmas Special. In addition to performing, composing and recording, Weiss has been committed to jazz education throughout his career.

Weiss presented a New York tribute concert to Horace Silver, who he credits as "one of his earliest and longest lasting influences."

== Critical response ==
Writing about Weiss's album Soul Journey in All About Jazz, Dan McClenaghan said, "It's the songs, though, that star on Soul Journey. And though Weiss doesn't call attention to himself as an instrumentalist, additional listens reveal a richness to his own solos, a smooth and understated eloquence."

Reviewing Soul Journey for All About Jazz, Chris Hovan said, "What will come as a revelation is the transformation that the pieces have made now that they’ve been fleshed out even further by Weiss for this larger ensemble."

Writing for Jazz Review of a performance by Johnny Griffin, in which Weiss played piano, Ben Ratliff said, "With the band playing beautifully behind him, he played a set like many he has played before, ... The set had tentative moments, but he ended fully on his feet, and it was as good a demonstration of blues phrasing as can be heard in jazz."

Writing a review of the album Power Station for Jazz Times, Sid Gribetz said, "Weiss is an excellent pianist who plays bebop and hard-bop lines with elegance and precision. He has a deft touch and swinging rhythmic sense, with the right dollop of funk and soul." Gribetz went on to mention Weiss's long association with Johnny Griffin.

== Discography ==
=== As leader ===
- Presenting Michael Weiss (Criss Cross, 1986)
- Power Station (DIW, 1998)
- Milestones (SteepleChase, 2000)
- Soul Journey (Sintra, 2003)
- Persistence (Cellar Live, 2022)
- Homage (Cellar Live, 2023)

=== As a member ===
Vanguard Jazz Orchestra

- Monday Night Live at the Village Vanguard (Planet Arts, 2008)
- Forever Lasting – Live in Tokyo (Planet Arts, 2011)

=== As sideman ===
With Johnny Griffin

- Take My Hand (Who's Who in Jazz, 1988)
- The Cat (Antilles, 1990)
- Dance of Passion (Antilles, 1992)
- Johnny Griffin & Steve Grossman Quintet (Dreyfus, 2000)

With Frank Wess

- Body and Soul (Grave News, 2005)
- Once Is Not Enough (Labeth Music, 2009)

With others

- Georgie Fame, Cool Cat Blues (Blue Moon/Bean Bag Entertainment, 1991)
- Nathen Page, The Other Page (1991, Hugo's Music)
- Charles McPherson, First Flight Out (Arabesque, 1994)
- Ronnie Cuber, N.Y.C.ats (SteepleChase, 1997)
- Doug Raney, Back in New York (SteepleChase, 1997)
- Smithsonian Jazz Masterworks Orchestra, Big Band Treasures Live (Smithsonian Folkways, 1997)
- Louis Smith, The Bopsmith (SteepleChase, 2001)
- Eszter Balint, Mud (Bar/None, 2004)
- Dick Oatts, Two Hearts (SteepleChase, 2010)
- Bruce Harris, Beginnings (Posi-tone, 2017)
