= McPherson's Mood =

Studio album by Charles McPherson
- Released: 1970
- Recorded: December 23, 1969; RCA Studios, New York City
- Genre: Jazz
- Length: 41:19
- Labels: Prestige; PR 7743
- Producer: Don Schlitten

Charles McPherson chronology
Horizons (1968)	McPherson's Mood (1970)	Charles McPherson (1971)

McPherson's Mood is the sixth album led by saxophonist Charles McPherson recorded in 1969 and released on the Prestige label.

== Reception ==
Professional ratings
Review scores
Source	Rating
Allmusic	4/5 stars
The Rolling Stone Jazz Record Guide	4/5 stars
The Penguin Guide to Jazz Recordings	3.5/4 stars

Allmusic awarded the album 4 stars with its review by Alex Henderson stating, "McPherson's Mood isn't the least bit innovative (by 1969 standards), but it's definitely solid and enjoyable".

== Track listing ==
All compositions by Charles McPherson except as indicated

1. "Explorations" - 5:22
2. "McPherson's Mood" - 8:12
3. "Opalescence" - 5:37
4. "My Cherie Amour" (Henry Cosby, Sylvia Moy, Stevie Wonder) - 8:23
5. "Mish-Mash-Bash" - 6:58
6. "I Get a Kick Out of You" (Cole Porter) - 6:47

== Personnel ==
- Charles McPherson - alto saxophone
- Barry Harris - piano
- Buster Williams - bass
- Roy Brooks - drums
