= Rockin' in Rhythm =

1931 jazz instrumental by the Jungle Band (Duke Ellington)

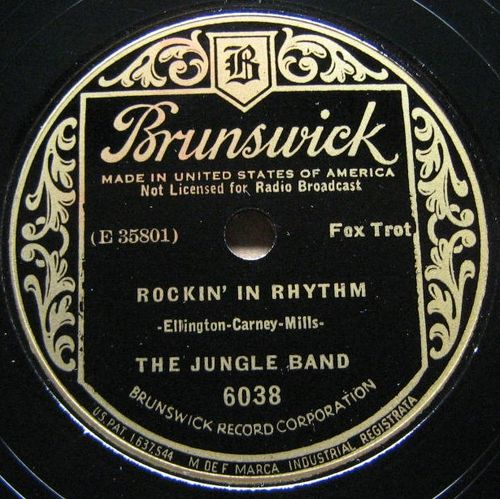

Single by Duke Ellington
- Released: February 1931
- Recorded: January 14, 1931
- Studio: Brunswick Studios, New York City
- Genre: Jazz • Swing (proto-swing)
- Length: 3:02
- Label: Brunswick 6038
- Songwriters: Duke Ellington; Harry Carney; Irving Mills

Rockin' in Rhythm is a 1931 jazz instrumental composed by Duke Ellington, Harry Carney, and Irving Mills. The song was first recorded by Ellington and his orchestra for Brunswick Records on January 14, 1931, in New York City.

== Background and composition ==
The piece originated as a riff brought to the band by baritone saxophonist Harry Carney, who had joined Ellington in 1927 at age 17 and would remain until Ellington's death in 1974. Ellington developed Carney's idea into a full arrangement during the orchestra's long residency at the Cotton Club (1927–1931). As was customary at the time, Ellington's manager and publisher Irving Mills received co-writing credit.

Written in C major, the composition is celebrated for its infectious swing feel, tight ensemble work, and a standout clarinet solo by Barney Bigard. Ellington himself described it as “as close as an arrangement gets to sounding spontaneous.” It is regarded as one of the earliest examples of the big-band swing style that would dominate the later 1930s.

== Later recordings ==
Ellington later reworked the tune as part of "Kinda Dukish", which appeared on his 1960 album Piano in the Background.

"Rockin' in Rhythm" was one of the melodies which featured in the 1986 BBC television series The Singing Detective by Dennis Potter.

== Versions ==
- Ella Fitzgerald on Ella Fitzgerald Sings the Duke Ellington Song Book
- Ella Fitzgerald on Fine and Mellow
- Sonny Criss on Rockin' in Rhythm
- Charlie Barnet recording of 06-19-1940, as played on KCEA.org 4/30/2014, 1:24 PM PDT
- Richard Thompson on Strict Tempo!
