= Live in Tokyo (Charles McPherson album) =

Live album by Charles McPherson
- Released: 1976
- Recorded: April 14, 1976; Sun Plaza Hall, Tokyo, Japan
- Genre: Jazz
- Label: Xanadu; 131
- Producer: Don Schlitten

Charles McPherson chronology
Beautiful! (1975)	Live in Tokyo (1976)	New Horizons (1977)

Live in Tokyo is a live album by saxophonist Charles McPherson which was recorded in Japan in 1976 and released on the Xanadu label.

== Reception ==
Professional ratings
Review scores
Source	Rating
AllMusic	4.5/5 stars
The Rolling Stone Jazz Record Guide	4/5 stars

The AllMusic review awarded the album 4½ stars, stating "McPherson is in top form".

== Track listing ==
All compositions by Charles McPherson except as indicated

1. "Tokyo Blue" – 7:14
2. "East of the Sun" (Brooks Bowman) – 5:32
3. "Desafinado" (Antonio Carlos Jobim, Newton Mendonça) – 8:32
4. "Orient Express" – 9:13
5. "These Foolish Things" (Eric Maschwitz, Jack Strachey, Harry Link) – 6:18
6. "Bouncing with Bud" (Bud Powell) – 6:34

== Personnel ==
- Charles McPherson – alto saxophone
- Barry Harris – piano
- Sam Jones – bass, cello
- Leroy Williams – drums
