= There Is No Other Way =

There Is No Other Way may refer to:

- "There Is No Other Way" (Desperate Housewives), a television episode
- "There's No Other Way", a song by Blur
- "There Is No Other Way", a song written by Stephen Sondheim, from the musical Pacific Overtures
- "There Is No Other Way", a song by Dolo Coker from Third Down

== See also ==
- There is no alternative, a slogan used by Margaret Thatcher
