= Con Alma! =

Studio album by Charles McPherson
- Released: 1965
- Recorded: August 4, 1965
- Studio: Van Gelder Studio, Englewood Cliffs, New Jersey
- Genre: Jazz
- Length: 44:18
- Label: Prestige; PR 7427
- Producer: Don Schlitten

Charles McPherson chronology
Bebop Revisited! (1964)	Con Alma! (1965)	The Quintet/Live! (1966)

Con Alma! is the second album led by saxophonist Charles McPherson recorded in 1965 and released on the Prestige label.

== Reception ==
Professional ratings
Review scores
Source	Rating
Allmusic	4/5 stars
The Rolling Stone Jazz Record Guide	3/5 stars
The Penguin Guide to Jazz Recordings	3.5/4 stars

Allmusic awarded the album 4 stars with its review by Scott Yanow stating, "McPherson and Harris both have their share of fine solos, but Jordan generally takes honors on this set; he is the only musician who was looking beyond bop and playing in a more original style".

== Track listing ==
1. "Eronel" (Thelonious Monk) – 7:06
2. "In a Sentimental Mood" (Duke Ellington, Manny Kurtz, Irving Mills) – 8:00
3. "Chasing the Bird" (Charlie Parker) – 7:12
4. "Con Alma" (Dizzy Gillespie) – 5:31
5. "I Don't Know" (Charles McPherson) – 8:19
6. "Dexter Rides Again" (Dexter Gordon, Bud Powell) – 8:10

== Personnel ==
- Charles McPherson – alto saxophone
- Clifford Jordan – tenor saxophone
- Barry Harris – piano
- George Tucker – bass
- Alan Dawson – drums
