= Dolo! =

Studio album by Dolo Coker
- Released: 1977
- Recorded: December 26, 1976, Los Angeles CA
- Genre: Jazz
- Label: Xanadu; 139
- Producer: Don Schlitten

Dolo Coker chronology
Dolo! (1977)	California Hard (1976)

Dolo! is the debut album by pianist Dolo Coker which was recorded in 1976 and released on the Xanadu label.

== Reception ==
Professional ratings
Review scores
Source	Rating
Allmusic	4/5 stars

The Allmusic review stated "The music is as hard swinging as one would expect from this personnel".

== Track listing ==
All compositions by Dolo Coker except as indicated

1. "Dolo" - 7:23
2. "Affair in Havana - 6:48
3. "Lady Hawthorne, Please" - 6:42
4. "Field Day" - 8:11
5. "Never Let Me Go" (Jay Livingston, Ray Evans) - 7:20
6. "Smack Up" (Harold Land) - 5:34

== Personnel ==
- Dolo Coker - piano
- Blue Mitchell - trumpet, flugelhorn (tracks 1–4 & 6)
- Harold Land - tenor saxophone (tracks 1–4 & 6)
- Leroy Vinnegar - bass
- Frank Butler - drums
