= Peter Sprague =

American jazz guitarist

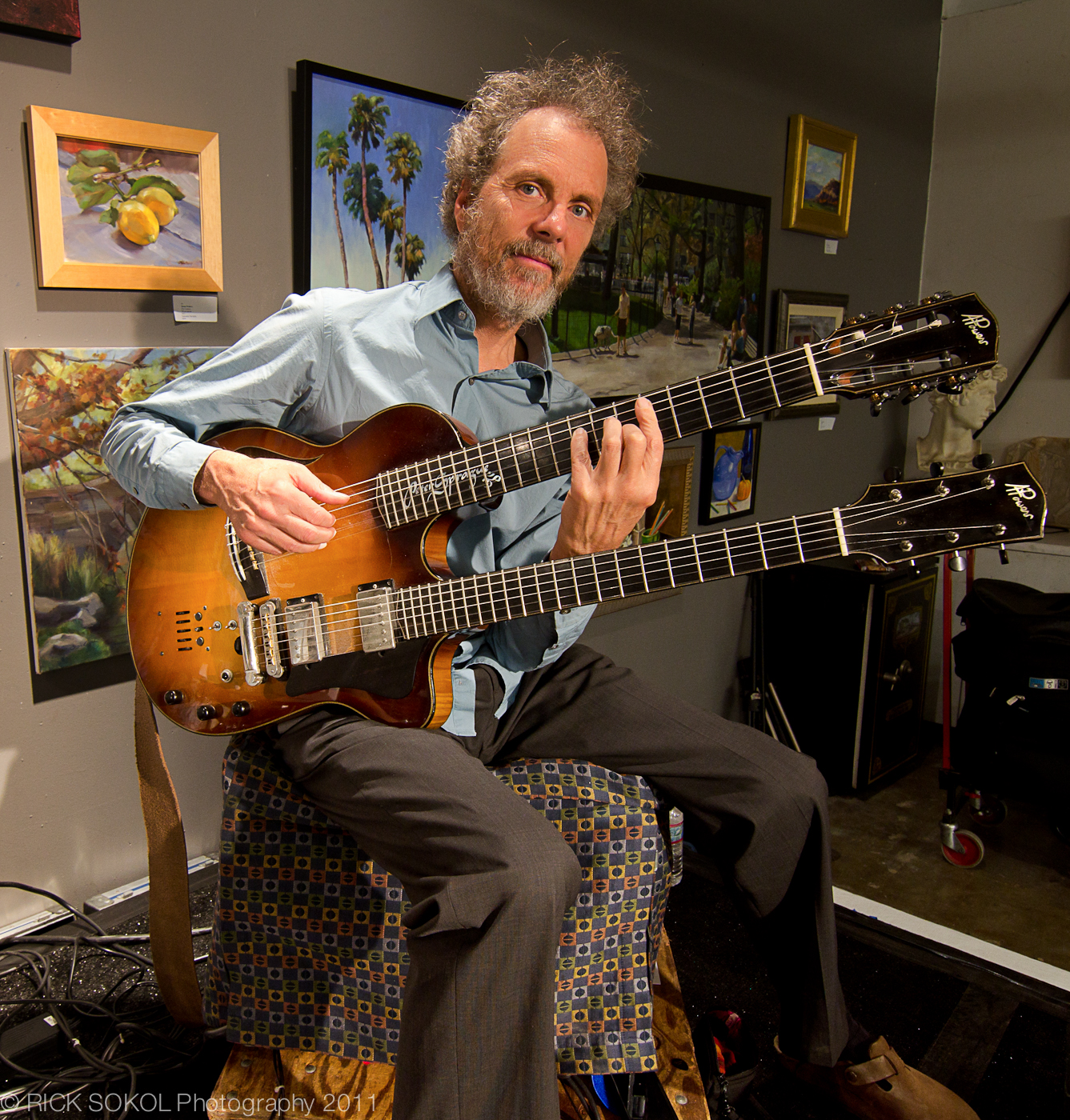
- Peter Sprague, December 2011; Photo by Rick Sokol

Background information
- Born: Peter Tripp Sprague; October 11, 1955 (age 71); Cleveland, Ohio, U.S.
- Genres: Jazz rock, rock, folk jazz, folk rock
- Occupations: Musician, composer, audio engineer, record producer, author
- Instrument: Guitar
- Years active: 1976–present
- Labels: Xanadu, Concord, SBE
- Website: petersprague.com

Peter Tripp Sprague (born October 11, 1955) is an American guitarist, record producer, and audio engineer. He owns SpragueLand Studios and the label SBE Records. He invented a twin-neck guitar with one neck from a classical guitar and one from a steel-string acoustic guitar.

Sprague studied with guitarist Pat Metheny, Madame Chaloff, and classical guitarist Albin Czak, and has played with Chick Corea, Hubert Laws, Larry Coryell, David Benoit, and Sergio Mendes. He has produced or played on more than 190 recordings. He has published music books, several of which are his transcriptions of his music, and has transcribed songbooks for Chick Corea.

He composed and performed a guitar concerto with the Grossmont Symphony Orchestra in May 2000 and with the San Diego Symphony in May 2002, and performed a number of times at Jazz at Lincoln Center in New York City. He has toured in Europe and Japan with vocalist Dianne Reeves.

Sprague has taught at the Musicians Institute, California Institute of the Arts, and the jazz camp of University of California, San Diego.

In a 1984 review for the Los Angeles Times, jazz critic Leonard Feather called Sprague, "One of the emergent great guitarists."

== Biography ==
=== Early years ===
Peter Sprague was born in Cleveland, Ohio in 1955. His family moved frequently, settling in 1961 in Del Mar, California, where he fell in love with surfing. Although his parents were jazz fans, he was more interested in the Beatles, Jimi Hendrix, and Crosby, Stills, and Nash when he picked up the guitar at age 12. Three years later, he paid more attention to his parents' jazz collection and began taking guitar lessons. He formed the Minor Jazz Quintet with his brother Tripp and three other musicians. He attended San Dieguito High School in Encinitas and Interlochen Arts Academy in Michigan.

=== Career ===
In 1976, he moved to Boston to study with classical guitarist Albin Czak. He received some lessons from Pat Metheny, who he considers his hero. He returned home to Del Mar in 1978 and formed the Dance of the Universe Orchestra with Tripp, John Leftwich, Kelly Jacoy, and Kevyn Lettau. They recorded the album You Make Me Want to Sing.

While recording with Charles McPherson on his album Free Bop! (Xanadu, 1978), Sprague caught the attention of Xanadu Records, which offered him a four-album contract.

Chick Corea invited him to play for a concert series during a holiday weekend at Disneyland. Corea praised Sprague's transcriptions of his Elektric Band.

Sprague's affinity for Latin music led to a reunion with Kevyn Lettau and her husband, jazz percussionist Michael Shapiro. That led to Sprague's playing with Sergio Mendes. In the late 1980s he joined pianist David Benoit's group, with whom over a three-year period he recorded two albums and toured extensively throughout the United States, the Philippines, and Japan.

He married Stefanie Flory in 1991. When their daughter was born two years later, he left the Benoit band to stay closer to home. For some time he had been interested in composing, recording, and producing, and—inspired by Jimi Hendrix's (another of his heroes) Electric Lady Land Studios in Greenwich Village, New York—he created SpragueLand Studios, a recording and production studio at his home. Aside from his work, he records, engineers, and produces albums for musicians in several genres.

In the Spring 2008 issue of The Ocean magazine, he said, "My wife and daughter keep me grounded. I wouldn't have that connection if I was constantly on the road or living in another city. Leucadia is my home. I love it here. I can walk down the street and in a matter of minutes be surfing excellent waves, come back home, shower, record excellent music, all the while fully enjoying my family, not missing a beat. How much does a person need? This does it for me."

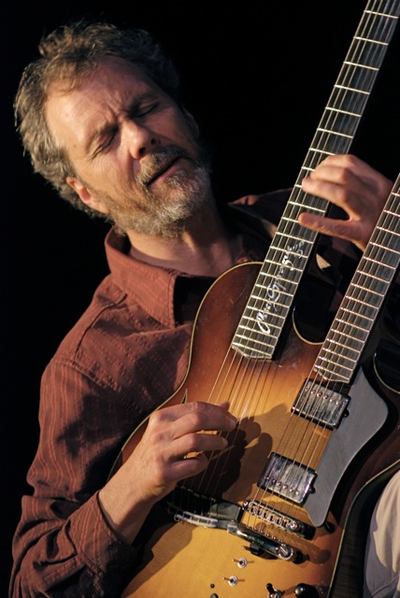
Photo by Michael Oletta

He plays in the band Blurring the Edges with his brother Tripp on saxophone and flute, and his father, Hall Sprague, on percussion. He has worked with pianist Geoffrey Keezer and vocalist Dianne Reeves; with the San Diego Symphony he performed his guitar concerto. He started the record label SBE, an acronym for "striving to break even".

"'Our philosophy,' Sprague explains, 'goes like this: most of the time, people want to make a financial killing on their artistic endeavors. Most of the time, especially if it's "artistic", this won't ever happen. Just doing the project is loads of fun and our idea is to make enough dough to do it again. Aim low enough to break even and then free the mind of its turmoil so you can experience the process. Zen and the art of the record business.'"

The Peter Sprague String Consort combines four string players (Bridgette Dolkas and Jeanne Skrocki on violin, Pam Jacobson on viola, and Lars Hoefs on cello) with himself on guitar along with frequent longtime collaborators Duncan Moore (drums) and Bob Magnusson (bass). For this group he has composed fusion pieces which combine elements of classical, jazz, and American folk, and released the album The Wild Blue (2009).

In 2010 he won a Chamber Music America grant to compose a new major piece; he chose to compose it for the String Consort and completed it in 2011, titling it "Dr. Einstein's Spin." On December 2, 2011, the group gave its premiere performance in San Diego where local jazz critic Robert Bush rated it third among his top fifteen favorite concerts of the year. The same critic gave the album the top spot in the Top 10 SD Jazz Releases of 2013. His album Dream Walkin' (2015) with vocalist Leonard Patton was nominated for 2015 Best Jazz Album by San Diego Music Awards.

=== Teaching and writing ===
In 1985 Sprague accepted teaching positions at both the Musicians Institute (Hollywood) and the California Institute of the Arts (Los Angeles) and for three years taught students from all over the world. Connections at those schools landed him a two-year job where he would fly to Buenos Aires, Argentina, play concerts for a couple of weeks, then teach at a music camp in Las Lenas. Compiling the material he'd created and accumulated for his teaching, he published a theory book, The Sprague Technique. He then drew on the many transcriptions he'd made for himself over the years to publish several songbooks of both his own solos and the solos of some of his favorite other jazz musicians.

== Awards and honors ==
Year	Award	Organization
2024	Inducted into the San Diego Music Hall of Fame	San Diego Music Hall of Fame
2015	Lifetime Achievement Award	San Diego Music Awards
2013	Top 10 SD Jazz Releases of 2013	NBC 7 San Diego
2011	International Top Ten Jazz Releases 2011	San Diego Reader
2007	Best Jazz Artist	San Diego Music Awards
2004	Best Jazz Artist	San Diego Music Awards
2003	Best Jazz Artist of 2003 (poll)	San Diego Reader
2000	Best Mainstream Jazz Artist	San Diego Music Awards
2000	Best Jazz Artist of 2000 (poll)	San Diego Reader
1994	Best Pop Jazz Group (Blurring the Edges)	San Diego Music Awards
1988	Best of 1988—Musicians' Choice	San Diego Entertainer
1988	Best of 1988—Best Local Musician	San Diego Reader
1986	Best of 1986—Best Jazz Act	San Diego Entertainer
1984	Best of 1984	San Diego Newsline

== Discography ==
=== As leader ===
- Dance of the Universe (Xanadu, 1979)
- The Path (Xanadu, 1980)
- The Message Sent On the Wind (Xanadu, 1982)
- A Space Between Two Thoughts (SBE, 1982)
- Bird Raga (Xanadu, 1983)
- Musica del Mar (Concord Jazz, 1984)
- Na Pali Coast (Concord Jazz, 1985)
- Soliloquy (SBE, 1997)
- The Light Dance (SBE, 2001)
- Pass the Drum (SBE, 2003)
- Friends for Life (SBE, 2004)
- Taking It All In (SBE, 2005)
- Plays Solo (SBE, 2008)
- The Wild Blue (SBE, 2009)
- Free Floating (SBE, 2010)
- Mill Creek Road with Geoffrey Keezer (SBE, 2011)
- Calling Me Home (SBE, 2011)
- Dr. Einstein's Spin (SBE, 2013)
- Ocean in Your Eyes (SBE, 2014)
- Dream Walkin (SBE, 2015)
- Planet Cole Porter (SBE, 2017)
- Lucy in the Sky (SBE, 2017)
- Samba Andaluza (SBE, 2018)
- Sparks and Seeds (SBE, 2018)

=== As sideman ===
With Checkfield

- Spirit (Pausa, 1983)
- Water, Wind, and Stone (American Gramaphone, 1986)
- A View from the Edge (American Gramaphone, 1988)

With Denise Donatelli

- What Lies Within (Savant, 2008)
- When Lights Are Low (Savant, 2010)
- Soul Shadows (Savant, 2012)

With Kevyn Lettau

- Kevyn Lettau (Nova, 1989)
- Brazil Jazz (JVC, 1990)
- Another Season (JVC, 1993)

With Bob Magnusson

- Road Work Ahead (Discovery, 1980)
- Two Generations of Music (Discovery, 1982)
- Song for Janet Lee (Discovery, 1984)
- Liquid Lines (SBE, 2006)

With Charlie Shoemake

- Crossroads (Discovery, 1982)
- Plays the Music of David Raksin (Discovery, 1983)
- I Think We're Almost There (Discovery, 1986)

With others

- Fred Benedetti & George Svoboda, Scirocco (SBE, 1995)
- Fred Benedetti & George Svoboda, Zephyr (SBE, 1996)
- David Benoit, Letter to Evan (GRP, 1992)
- David Benoit, Shaken Not Stirred (GRP, 1994)
- Billy Childs, I've Known Rivers (Stretch, 1994)
- Mike Garson, Serendipity (Reference, 1986)
- Diane Hubka, West Coast Strings (SSG, 2013)
- Geoffrey Keezer, Aurea (ArtistShare, 2009)
- Matthew Lien, Bleeding Wolves (Whispering Willow, 1995)
- Manzanita, Pirate Lady (Award, 1979)
- Eric Marienthal, One Touch (GRP, 1992)
- Bill Mays, Kaleidoscope (Jazz Alliance, 1992)
- Charles McPherson, Free Bop! (Xanadu, 1979)
- Dan Siegel, Future Prospect (Optimism, 1987)
- Warren Wiebe, Sings the Songs of Terry Sannita (SBE, 1992)
