= The Influence (album) =

Studio album by Jimmy Raney
- Released: 1975
- Recorded: September 2, 1975
- Genre: Jazz
- Length: 36:12
- Label: Xanadu; 116
- Producer: Don Schlitten

Jimmy Raney chronology
Momentum (1974)	The Influence (1975)	Live in Tokyo (1976)

The Influence is a studio album by American jazz guitarist Jimmy Raney, released in 1975 for Xanadu Records.

== Reception ==
Professional ratings
Review scores
Source	Rating
Allmusic	4/5 stars

The Allmusic review awarded the album 4 stars stating "After barely being on records at all from 1957-1974 (just three albums of material and only one and a half albums during 1958-1973), the great guitarist Jimmy Raney had several opportunities to record for Xanadu between 1975-1976. His debut for the label consists of six trio numbers with bassist Sam Jones and drummer Billy Higgins, along with a couple of unaccompanied solos".

== Track listing ==
No.	Title	Writer(s)	Length
1.	"I Love You"	Cole Porter	2:46
2.	"Body and Soul"	Frank Eyton, Johnny Green, Edward Heyman, Robert Sour	7:53
3.	"It Could Happen to You"	Johnny Burke, Jimmy Van Heusen	5:37
4.	"Suzanne"	Jimmy Raney	4:54
5.	"Get Out of Town"	Porter	5:46
6.	"There Will Never Be Another You"	Mack Gordon, Harry Warren	4:14
7.	"The End of a Love Affair"	Edward Redding	2:54
8.	"Dancing in the Dark"	Howard Dietz, Arthur Schwartz	4:08

== Personnel ==
- Jimmy Raney - guitar
- Billy Higgins - drums
- Sam Jones - bass
