= Changes & Things =

Studio album by Sam Jones
- Released: 1978
- Recorded: September 14, 1977; New York City
- Genre: Jazz
- Label: Xanadu; 150
- Producer: Don Schlitten

Sam Jones chronology
Double Bass (1976)	Changes & Things (1978)	Something in Common (1978)

Changes & Things is an album by bassist and cellist Sam Jones which was recorded in 1977 and released on the Xanadu label.

== Reception ==
Professional ratings
Review scores
Source	Rating
AllMusic	4/5 stars
DownBeat	4/5 stars

Scott Yanow of AllMusic states "Bassist Sam Jones' recordings as a leader have generally been underrated, but virtually every one is well-planned and recommended... The solos are colorful and purposeful, the material fairly diverse, and the results consistently swinging yet rarely predictable".

== Track listing ==
All compositions by Sam Jones except as indicated

1. "Stablemates" (Benny Golson) - 6:59
2. "Miss Morgan" - 7:59
3. "Laverne Walk" (Oscar Pettiford) - 5:22
4. "Trane Changes" (Slide Hampton) - 7:29
5. "Sam's Things" - 5:57
6. "Blue's" (Blue Mitchell) - 7:58

== Personnel ==
- Sam Jones - bass
- Blue Mitchell - trumpet
- Slide Hampton - trombone
- Bob Berg - tenor saxophone
- Barry Harris - piano
- Louis Hayes - drums
