= Charles McPherson (album) =

Studio album by Charles McPherson
- Released: 1971
- Recorded: June 16 & 17, 1971; Mercury Recording Studios, New York City
- Genre: Jazz
- Label: Mainstream; MRL 329
- Producer: Bob Shad

Charles McPherson chronology
| McPherson's Mood (1969) | Charles McPherson (1971) | Siku Ya Bibi (Day of the Lady) (1972) |

Charles McPherson is an album by saxophonist Charles McPherson which was recorded in 1971 and released on the Mainstream label.

== Track listing ==
All compositions by Charles McPherson except as indicated

1. "What's Going On" (Marvin Gaye, Renaldo Benson, Al Cleveland) - 3:26
2. "Serenity" - 7:25
3. "My Funny Valentine (Richard Rodgers, Lorenz Hart) - 7:37
4. "Another Kind of Blues" - 7:03
5. "While We're Young" (Alec Wilder, William Engvick, Morty Palitz) - 6:33
6. "Bird Feathers" (Charlie Parker) - 5:10

== Personnel ==
- Charles McPherson - alto saxophone
- Lonnie Hillyer - trumpet
- Gene Bertoncini, Carl Lynch - guitar
- Nico Bunink, Barry Harris - piano
- Ron Carter - bass
- Leroy Williams - drums
