= Dolo Coker =

American jazz pianist and composer

- Born: November 16, 1927; Hartford, Connecticut, U.S.
- Died: April 13, 1983 (aged 55)
- Genres: Jazz
- Occupations: Musician, composer
- Instrument: Piano
- Label: Xanadu

Charles Mitchell "Dolo" Coker (November 16, 1927 – April 13, 1983) was a jazz pianist and composer who recorded four albums for Xanadu Records and performed extensively as a sideman for artists including Sonny Stitt, Gene Ammons, Lou Donaldson, Art Pepper, Philly Joe Jones, and Dexter Gordon.

== Biography ==
Charles Mitchell "Dolo" Coker was born in Hartford, Connecticut on November 16, 1927, raised in both Philadelphia and Florence, South Carolina. The first musical instruments Coker played in childhood were the C-melody and alto saxophones, learning them at a school in Camden, South Carolina. By the age of thirteen he was starting to play piano. Coker moved to Philadelphia, where he studied piano at the Landis School of Music and at Orenstein's Conservatory. Coker also played some shows on piano for Jimmy Heath while in Philadelphia.

He was also a member of the Frank Morgan Quartet (with Flip Greene on bass and Larance Marable on drums).

Coker did not record his own album as a leader until 1976, when he recorded his debut Dolo! with Blue Mitchell, Harold Land, Leroy Vinnegar and Frank Butler. That following day he recorded California Hard for Xanadu Records, with Art Pepper replacing Harold Land on sax. Following California Hard were Third Down and All Alone. He continued to work as a sideman for other artists until he died of cancer at the age of fifty-five on April 13, 1983.

== Discography ==
=== As leader/co-leader ===
Year recorded	Title	Label	Notes
1976	Dolo!	Xanadu	One track trio, with Leroy Vinnegar (bass), Frank Butler (drums); most tracks quintet, with Blue Mitchell (trumpet, flugelhorn), Harold Land (tenor sax) added
1976	California Hard	Xanadu	Quintet, with Blue Mitchell (trumpet, flugelhorn), Art Pepper (alto sax, tenor sax), Leroy Vinnegar (bass guitar), Frank Butler (drums)
1977	Third Down	Xanadu	Most tracks trio, with Leroy Vinnegar (bass guitar), Frank Butler (drums); two tracks quartet, with Harry Edison (trumpet) added
1979	All Alone	Xanadu	Solo piano
1980	Xanadu in Africa	Xanadu	Quintet, co-led with Al Cohn and Billy Mitchell (tenor sax), Leroy Vinnegar (bass), Frank Butler (drums); in concert
1980	Night Flight to Dakar	Xanadu	Quintet, co-led with Al Cohn and Billy Mitchell (tenor sax), Leroy Vinnegar (bass), Frank Butler (drums); in concert

=== As sideman ===
With Frank Butler

- The Stepper (Xanadu, 1977)
- Wheelin' and Dealin' (Xanadu, 1978)

With Junior Cook

- Junior's Cookin' (Jazzland, 1961)

With Sonny Criss

- Crisscraft (Muse, 1975)
- Out of Nowhere (Muse, 1976)

With Harry Edison

- Edison's Lights (Pablo, 1976)
- Simply Sweets (Pablo, 1978) with Eddie "Lockjaw" Davis

With Teddy Edwards

- Feelin's (Muse, 1974)

With Dexter Gordon

- The Resurgence of Dexter Gordon (Jazzland, 1960)

With Philly Joe Jones

- Showcase (Riverside, 1959)

With Les McCann

- Les McCann Sings (Pacific Jazz, 1961)

With Art Pepper

- Intensity (Contemporary, 1963)

With Red Rodney

- Superbop (Muse, 1974)

With Sonny Stitt

- 37 Minutes and 48 Seconds with Sonny Stitt (Roost, 1957)
- I Remember Bird (Catalyst, 1977)
