= Just Be Bop =

Studio album by Toshiko Akiyoshi
- Released: ~1980
- Recorded: 1980 March 24~25
- Genre: Jazz
- Length: 40:38
- Label: Discomate
- Producer: Toshiko Akiyoshi

Toshiko Akiyoshi chronology
Notorious Tourist from the East (1978)	Just Be Bop (1980)	Toshiko Akiyoshi Trio, 1980 In Rikuzentakata (1980)

Just Be Bop is a jazz album recorded by pianist Toshiko Akiyoshi in 1980 and released in Japan on the Discomate record label.

== Track listing ==
LP side A

1. "Kelo" (Johnson) – 5:02
2. "But Beautiful" (Van Heusen) – 5:15
3. "Serpent's Tooth" (Heath) – 5:25
4. "Mobious Trip" (Huffsteter) – 4:29

LP side B

1. "Con Alma" (Gillespie) – 8:10
2. "I Thought About You" (Mercer, Van Heusen) – 4:39
3. "Joy Spring" (Brown) – 7:38

== Personnel ==
- Toshiko Akiyoshi – piano
- Charles McPherson – alto saxophone
- Steve Huffsteter – trumpet (A1–A4, B3), flugelhorn (B1–B2)
- Roy McCurdy – drums
- Bob Bowman – bass (except "Kelo" and "But Beautiful")
- Gene Cherico – bass (on "Kelo" and "But Beautiful")
