= Lucifer (Kenny Barron album) =

Studio album by Kenny Barron
- Released: 1975
- Recorded: April 28, 1975
- Studio: Bell Sound (New York City)
- Genre: Jazz
- Length: 47:24
- Label: Muse
- Producer: Michael Cuscuna

Kenny Barron chronology
| In Tandem (1975) | Lucifer (1975) | Innocence (1978) |

Lucifer is a studio album by American pianist Kenny Barron which was recorded in 1975 and released on the Muse label.

Professional ratings
Review scores
| Source | Rating |
|---|---|
| Allmusic | 3/5 stars |

== Track listing ==
All compositions by Kenny Barron except where noted.

1. "Spirits" – 9:00
2. "Firefly" – 8:52
3. "Ethereally Yours" – 5:53
4. "Hellbound" – 13:00
5. "Lucifer" – 5:36
6. "Oleo" (Sonny Rollins) – 5:03

== Personnel ==
- Kenny Barron – piano, clavinet, electric piano, string synthesizer, cowbells
- Charles Sullivan – trumpet (tracks 1, 2 & 5)
- Bill Barron – soprano saxophone (tracks 1, 2 & 5)
- James Spaulding – alto saxophone, bass flute (tracks 1–3 & 5)
- Carlos Alomar – acoustic guitar, electric guitar (tracks 1, 2 & 5)
- Chris White – electric bass (tracks 1, 2 & 5)
- Billy Hart – drums (tracks 1, 2 & 5)
