= My Favorite Quintet =

Live album by Charles Mingus
- Released: 1966
- Recorded: May 13, 1965
- Venue: Guthrie Theater, Minneapolis, Minnesota
- Genre: Jazz
- Label: Jazz Workshop (JWS 009)

Charles Mingus chronology
Mingus at Monterey (1964)	My Favorite Quintet (1966)	Music Written for Monterey 1965 (1965)

My Favorite Quintet is a live album by the American bassist, composer and bandleader Charles Mingus, recorded at Guthrie Theater in Minneapolis and released on Mingus's own Jazz Workshop label in 1966.

== Reception ==
The AllMusic review by Shawn M. Haney stated: "Charles Mingus shines here in proud fashion with the company of his friends to create the sound of the Charles Mingus Quintet. Sweeping, charming, vibrant, percussive -- these are just a few select adjectives used to paint a meaningful picture of this group... Some bits and pieces of the music leave the listener just short of breathless -- a record so teaming with life and spontaneity leaves tingles in one's listening soul. In over 40 minutes of quality jazz, not much is sheer brilliance, though the band's sense of adventure and enthusiasm shows throughout when the melody doesn't".

Professional ratings
Review scores
Source	Rating
AllMusic	3/5 stars
The Rolling Stone Jazz Record Guide	3/5 stars

== Track listing ==
All compositions by Charles Mingus except as indicated

1. "So Long Eric" - 18:24
2. "Medley: She's Funny That Way/Embraceable You/I Can't Get Started/I Don't Stand a Ghost of a Chance with You/Old Portrait" (Neil Moret, Richard A. Whiting/George Gershwin, Ira Gershwin/Ira Gershwin, Vernon Duke/Victor Young, Ned Washington, Bing Crosby/Mingus) - 15:58
3. "Cocktails for Two (Arthur Johnston, Sam Coslow) - 8:15

== Personnel ==
- Charles Mingus - bass
- Lonnie Hillyer - trumpet
- Charles McPherson - alto saxophone
- Jaki Byard - piano
- Dannie Richmond - drums
