= Opening Remarks =

Studio album by Ted Dunbar
- Released: 1978
- Recorded: January 24, 1978
- Genre: Jazz
- Label: Xanadu

Ted Dunbar chronology
| In Tandem (1975) | Opening Remarks (1978) | Secundum Artem (1981) |

Opening Remarks is a 1978 studio album by jazz guitarist Ted Dunbar, recorded for Xanadu Records.

== Track listing ==
1. "Entrance"
2. "Two Areas" - 9:08
3. "Hang In There" - 7:43
4. "Lazy Lane" - 4:41
5. "Never Again" - 5:23
6. "Tonal Search" - 8:06
7. "Grand Mal - Petit Mal"
8. "Exit" - 5:42

All music composed by Ted Dunbar.

== Personnel ==
- Ted Dunbar - guitar
- Tommy Flanagan - piano
- Sam Jones - bass
- Leroy Williams - drums
