= Manhattan Nocturne (album) =

Studio album by Charles McPherson
- Released: May 5, 1998
- Recorded: April 24–25, 1997
- Studios: EastSide Sound, New York City
- Genre: Jazz
- Length: 59:52
- Labels: Arabesque; AJ-134
- Producers: Charles McPherson, Daniel Criss

Charles McPherson chronology
Live at Vartan Jazz (1996)	Manhattan Nocturne (1998)	Is That It? No, But... (2001)

Manhattan Nocturne is an album by the saxophonist Charles McPherson, recorded in 1997 and released on the Arabesque label the following year.

== Reception ==
Professional ratings
Review scores
Source	Rating
AllMusic	4.5/5 stars
The Penguin Guide to Jazz Recordings	3.5/4 stars

The AllMusic review by Michael G. Nastos stated: "This CD by McPherson is his best of the '70s, '80s, and '90s, and he's done some very good ones. The combination of seasoned, thinking musicians and excellent material, played to the hilt, is too good a combination for any jazz lover to resist".

== Track listing ==
All compositions by Charles McPherson except where noted

1. "Evidence" (Thelonious Monk) – 6:10
2. "You're My Thrill" (Jay Gorney, Sidney Clare) – 8:13
3. "Morning Dance" – 6:39
4. "Primal Urge" – 8:15
5. "Blue 'n' Boogie" (Dizzy Gillespie, Frank Paparelli) – 7:07
6. "How Deep Is the Ocean?" (Irving Berlin) – 10:12
7. "Manhattan Nocturne" – 7:08
8. "Fire Dance" – 6:02

== Personnel ==
- Charles McPherson – alto saxophone
- Mulgrew Miller – piano
- Ray Drummond – double bass
- Victor Lewis – drums
- Bobby Sanabria – percussion
