= Right Now: Live at the Jazz Workshop =

Live album by Charles Mingus
- Released: 1966
- Recorded: June 2 & 3, 1964
- Genre: Jazz
- Length: 47:02
- Label: Fantasy LP 6017

Charles Mingus chronology
Mingus in Europe Volume II (1964)	Right Now: Live at the Jazz Workshop (1966)	Mingus at Monterey (1964)

Right Now: Live at the Jazz Workshop is a live album by the jazz bassist and composer Charles Mingus, recorded in San Francisco in 1964 and released on the Fantasy label in 1966.

== Reception ==
The AllMusic review by Scott Yanow stated: "Although not up to the passionate level of the Mingus-Dolphy Quintet, this underrated unit holds its own".

Professional ratings
Review scores
Source	Rating
AllMusic	3/5 stars
The Penguin Guide to Jazz Recordings	3/4 stars
The Rolling Stone Jazz Record Guide	5/5 stars

== Track listing ==
All compositions by Charles Mingus

1. "New Fables" - 23:18
2. "Meditation (for a Pair of Wire Cutters)" - 23:44

- Recorded at the Jazz Workshop in San Francisco, California, on June 2 & 3, 1964

== Personnel ==
- Charles Mingus - bass
- John Handy - alto saxophone (track 1)
- Clifford Jordan - tenor saxophone
- Jane Getz - piano
- Dannie Richmond - drums
