= Jazz Guitarist (album) =

Album by Ted Dunbar

Studio album by Ted Dunbar
- Released: 1982
- Recorded: 1982
- Genre: Jazz
- Label: Xanadu
- Producer: Don Schlitten

Ted Dunbar chronology
Secundum Artem (1980)	Jazz Guitarist (1982)

Jazz Guitarist is a solo studio album by jazz guitarist Ted Dunbar that was released by Xanadu in 1982.

== Track listing ==
1. "Winding Blues" - 4:05 (Ted Dunbar)
2. "Total Conversion" - 6:05 (Dunbar)
3. "Trees and Grass and Things" - 4:07 (Don Pullen)
4. "Nica's Dream" - 06:25 (Horace Silver)
5. "Hi-Fly" - 5:50 (Randy Weston)
6. "Bougie" - 7:55 (Dunbar)
7. "Epistrophy" - 6:45 (Thelonious Monk, Kenny Clarke)

== Personnel ==
- Ted Dunbar – guitar
