= Come Play with Me (album) =

Studio album by Charles McPherson
- Released: 1995
- Recorded: March 2, 1995
- Studio: Sound on Sound, New York City
- Genre: Jazz
- Length: 60:46
- Label: Arabesque; AJ-117
- Producer: Charles McPherson, Daniel Criss

Charles McPherson chronology
First Flight Out (1994)	Come Play with Me (1995)	Live at Vartan Jazz (1996)

Come Play with Me is an album by saxophonist Charles McPherson which was recorded in 1995 and released on the Arabesque label.

== Reception ==
Professional ratings
Review scores
Source	Rating
AllMusic	4.5/5 stars
The Penguin Guide to Jazz Recordings	4/4 stars

The AllMusic review by Scott Yanow said "Although he had rarely played with any of the sidemen heard on his Arabesque release before, the quartet presents a unified sound, as if they were a regularly working group. ... no matter what the vehicle, McPherson is in top form throughout this fine date and he sounds clearly inspired".

== Track listing ==
All compositions by Charles McPherson except where noted

1. "Get Happy" (Harold Arlen, Ted Koehler) – 4:43
2. "Lonely Little Christmas" – 9:16
3. "Marionette" – 6:51
4. "Pretty Girl Blues" – 7:18
5. "Darn That Dream" (Jimmy Van Heusen, Eddie DeLange) – 6:35
6. "Bloomdido" (Charlie Parker) – 5:54
7. "Jumping Jack" – 7:13
8. "Fun House" – 5:43
9. "Blues for Camille" – 7:13

== Personnel ==
- Charles McPherson – alto saxophone
- Mulgrew Miller – piano
- Santi Debriano – double bass
- Lewis Nash – drums
