= From This Moment On! =

Studio album by Charles McPherson
- Released: 1968
- Recorded: January 31, 1968; Impact Studios, New York City
- Genre: Jazz
- Length: 36:23
- Label: Prestige; PR 7559
- Producer: Don Schlitten

Charles McPherson chronology
The Quintet/Live! (1966)	From This Moment On! (1968)	Horizons (1968)

From This Moment On! is the fourth album led by saxophonist Charles McPherson recorded in 1968 and released on the Prestige label.

== Reception ==
Professional ratings
Review scores
Source	Rating
Allmusic	3/5 stars
The Rolling Stone Jazz Record Guide	3/5 stars
The Penguin Guide to Jazz Recordings	3/4 stars

Allmusic awarded the album 3 stars with its review by Scott Yanow stating, "Not one of McPherson's most essential releases, as the material and arrangements are just not that strong; nevertheless, the altoist still plays well, and his fans will want to pick up this reissue".

== Track listing ==
All compositions by Charles McPherson except as indicated

1. "Little Sugar Baby" - 4:14
2. "Once in a Lifetime" (Leslie Bricusse, Anthony Newley) - 5:11
3. "The Good Life" (Sacha Distel, Jack Reardon) - 6:40
4. "Like the Way You Shake That Thing" - 3:18
5. "From This Moment On" (Cole Porter) - 3:32
6. "Without You" (Osvaldo Farrés) - 7:10
7. "You've Changed" (Bill Carey, Carl Fischer) - 6:18

== Personnel ==
- Charles McPherson - alto saxophone
- Cedar Walton - piano
- Pat Martino - guitar
- Peck Morrison - bass
- Lenny McBrowne - drums
