= Music Written for Monterey 1965 =

Live album by Charles Mingus
- Released: 1965; 2006 CD reissue with bonus tracks
- Recorded: September 25, 1965; Royce Hall, University of California, Los Angeles
- Genre: Jazz
- Length: 87:23
- Label: Jazz Workshop JWS 013/14; Sunnyside SSC 3041 - CD Reissue
- Producer: Charles Mingus

Charles Mingus chronology
My Favorite Quintet (1965)	Music Written for Monterey 1965 (1965)	Charles Mingus in Paris: The Complete America Session (1970)

Original Album Cover

Music Written for Monterey 1965 (subtitled Not Heard... Played in its Entirety, at UCLA) is a live album by the American bassist, composer and bandleader Charles Mingus, recorded at Royce Hall in Los Angeles and released on Mingus's own Jazz Workshop label in 1966. The album was rereleased by Sue Mingus on the Sunnyside label in 2006.

== Reception ==
AllMusic's Jeff Tamarkin wrote that "as an adjunct to Mingus' lengthy discography, it's a fascinating and sometimes brilliant entry". Samuel Chell of All About Jazz stated that "this recording of the enigmatic, volatile composer's UCLA performance could be regarded as an indispensable 'document,' filling in another piece of the puzzle that was Charles Mingus while providing privileged insights into the creative process as well as the private, elusive domain known as the 'self.'"

Professional ratings
Review scores
Source	Rating
AllMusic	3.5/5 stars
The Penguin Guide to Jazz Recordings	4/4 stars
The Rolling Stone Jazz Record Guide	5/5 stars

== Track listing ==
All compositions by Charles Mingus except as indicated

Disc One:

1. Opening Speech – 0:42
2. "Meditation on Inner Peace Part I" – 17:57
3. Speech Introducing Musicians – 1:41
4. "Meditation on Inner Peace Part II" – 0:51
5. Speech – 0:15
6. "Once Upon a Time There Was a Holding Corporation Called Old America" – 0:08
7. Lecture to Band – 0:27
8. "Once Upon a Time, There Was a Holding Corporation Called Old America" –1:22
9. "Ode to Bird and Dizzy" [aka "Bird Preamble"] (Charlie Parker, Dizzy Gillespie, Denzil Best, Fats Navarro, Max Roach, Oscar Pettiford, Tadd Dameron, Lonnie Hillyer, Charles McPherson, Danny Richmond) – 10:18
10. Speech: Call Octet Back – 0:54
11. "They Trespass the Land of Sacred Sioux" – 7:11

Disc Two:

1. Speech: Introduction to Hobart Dotson/"The Arts of Tatum and Freddy Webster" – 10:01
2. Speech – 1:24
3. "Once Upon a Time, There Was a Holding Corporation Called Old America" – 11:01
4. Speech: Introduction to Lonnie Hillyer – 0:35
5. "Twelfth Street Rag" (misidentified on album as Muskrat Ramble (Kid Ory, Ray Gilbert) – 3:11
6. Pause – 0:11
7. "Don't Be Afraid, The Clown's Afraid Too" – 8:21
8. "Don't Let It Happen Here" – 10:53

== Personnel ==
- Charles Mingus – bass, piano, narration
- Hobart Dotson, Lonnie Hillyer – trumpet
- Jimmy Owens – trumpet, flugelhorn
- Julius Watkins – French horn
- Howard Johnson – tuba
- Charles McPherson – alto saxophone
- Dannie Richmond – drums
