= Today's Man (album) =

Studio album by Charles McPherson
- Released: 1973
- Recorded: 1973; New York City
- Genre: Jazz
- Label: Mainstream; MRL 395
- Producer: Bob Shad

Charles McPherson chronology
Siku Ya Bibi (Day of the Lady) (1972)	Today's Man (1973)	Beautiful! (1975)

Today's Man is an album by saxophonist Charles McPherson which was recorded in 1973 and released on the Mainstream label.

== Reception ==
Professional ratings
Review scores
Source	Rating
Allmusic	3/5 stars

The Allmusic site awarded the album 3 stars.

== Track listing ==
1. "Charisma" (Charles McPherson) - 5:07
2. "Naima" (John Coltrane) - 6:20
3. "Invitation" (Bronisław Kaper, Paul Francis Webster) - 3:15
4. "Stranger in Paradise" (Alexander Borodin, Robert Wright, George Forrest) - 5:53
5. "Cheryl" (Charlie Parker) - 6:17
6. "Bell Bottoms (Ernie Wilkins)" - 4:43

== Personnel ==
- Charles McPherson - alto saxophone
- Frank Wess - flute, tenor saxophone (tracks 1–3)
- Chris Woods - flute, baritone saxophone (tracks 1–3)
- Cecil Bridgewater, Richard Williams - trumpet, flugelhorn (tracks 1–3)
- Julius Watkins - French horn(tracks 1–3)
- Garnett Brown - trombone (tracks 1–3)
- Barry Harris - piano
- Larry Evans - bass
- Billy Higgins - drums
- Ernie Wilkins - conductor, arranger (tracks 1–3)
