= Pat Jones =

Pat Jones may refer to:

- Pat Jones (American football) (born 1947), American football player and coach
- Pat Jones (footballer, born 1920) (1920–1990), English footballer
- Patricia W. Jones (born 1950), American politician
- Pat Jones (hurdler) (born 1942), British hurdler and 1968 Olympian
- Pat Jones (footballer, born 2003), Welsh footballer

== See also ==
- Patrick Jones (disambiguation)
- Patricia Jones (disambiguation)
