= The Beat Goes On! (Sonny Criss album) =

Studio album by Sonny Criss
- Released: 1968
- Recorded: February 12, 1968; New York City
- Genre: Jazz
- Length: 33:22
- Label: Prestige; 7558

Sonny Criss chronology
Up, Up and Away (1967)	The Beat Goes On! (1968)	Sonny's Dream (Birth of the New Cool) (1968)

The Beat Goes On! is a jazz album by alto saxophonist Sonny Criss recorded in 1968 and released on the Prestige label.

== Reception ==
Professional ratings
Review scores
Source	Rating
AllMusic	4/5 stars
The Penguin Guide to Jazz Recordings	3/4 stars

AllMusic awarded the album 4 stars with its review by Scott Yanow stating, "This is one of a group of Prestige dates by Sonny Criss from the late '60s that featured the altoist elegantly ripping through pop tunes, standing them on their heads and making them into credible vehicles for his dazzling virtuosity."

== Track listing ==
1. "The Beat Goes On" (Sonny Bono) – 7:21
2. "Georgia Rose" (Jimmy Flynn, Harry Rosenthal, Alex Sullivan) – 3:31
3. "Somewhere My Love (Lara's Theme)" (Maurice Jarre, Paul Francis Webster) – 4:58
4. "Calidad" (Sonny Criss) – 5:29
5. "Yesterdays (Otto Harbach, Jerome Kern) – 5:51
6. "Ode to Billie Joe" (Bobbie Gentry) – 6:19

== Personnel ==
- Sonny Criss – alto saxophone
- Cedar Walton – piano
- Bob Cranshaw – bass
- Alan Dawson – drums
