= Out of Nowhere (Sonny Criss album) =

Studio album by Sonny Criss
- Released: 1976
- Recorded: October 20, 1975, Wally Heider Studios, Hollywood, California
- Genre: Jazz
- Length: 34:14
- Label: Muse; MR 5089
- Producer: Bob Porter

Sonny Criss chronology
Saturday Morning (1975)	Out of Nowhere (1976)	Warm and Sonny (1975)

Out of Nowhere is an album by jazz saxophonist Sonny Criss recorded in 1975 and originally released on the Muse label.

== Reception ==
Professional ratings
Review scores
Source	Rating
AllMusic	4/5 stars

AllMusic awarded the album 4 stars with its review by Scott Yanow stating "Criss's distinctive sound, mastery of bop and consistently swinging ideas are three strong reasons to acquire this".

== Track listing ==
1. "All the Things You Are" (Oscar Hammerstein II, Jerome Kern) – 4:01
2. "The Dreamer" (Sonny Criss) – 7:03
3. "El Tiante" (Dolo Coker) – 6:39
4. "My Ideal" (Newell Chase, Leo Robin, Richard A. Whiting) – 3:44
5. "Out of Nowhere" (Johnny Green, Edward Heyman) – 5:23
6. "Brother, Can You Spare a Dime?" (Jay Gorney, Yip Harburg) – 3:03
7. "The First One" (Criss) – 4:40

== Personnel ==
- Sonny Criss – alto saxophone
- Dolo Coker – piano
- Larry Gales – bass
- Jimmie Smith – drums
