= Third Down =

Studio album by Dolo Coker
- Released: 1979
- Recorded: November 18, 1977, Los Angeles CA
- Genre: Jazz
- Label: Xanadu; 153
- Producer: Don Schlitten

Dolo Coker chronology
California Hard (1976)	Third Down (1979)	All Alone (1979)

Third Down is the third album led by pianist Dolo Coker which was recorded in 1977 and released on the Xanadu label in 1979.

== Reception ==
Professional ratings
Review scores
Source	Rating
Allmusic	2.5/5 stars

The Allmusic review reccommened the album awarding it album 2½ stars and stating "The boppish pianist, who spent many of his key years in Los Angeles and was therefore always underrated, shows throughout this set that he was a creative player within the hard bop idiom".

== Track listing ==
All compositions by Dolo Coker except as indicated

1. "You Won't Let Me Go" (Bud Allen, Buddy Johnson) - 5:37
2. "Third Down" - 4:29
3. "This Is All I Ask" (Gordon Jenkins) - 6:12
4. "Sweet Coke" (Harry Edison, Dolo Coker) - 4:19
5. "Groovin' High" (Dizzy Gillespie) - 6:59
6. "There Is No Other Way" - 6:10
7. "Out Of Nowhere" (Johnny Green, Edward Heyman) - 8:22

== Personnel ==
- Dolo Coker - piano
- Harry Edison - trumpet (tracks 4 & 7)
- Leroy Vinnegar - bass
- Frank Butler - drums
