= Patricia Jones =

Patricia Jones may refer to:

- Patricia Jones (sprinter) (1930–2000), Canadian athlete who competed mainly in the 100 metres
- Patricia Darcy Jones (1953–2007), American rock singer, vocalist and Broadway actor
- Patricia Spears Jones (born 1951), American poet
- Patricia W. Jones (born 1950), American politician from Utah
- Patricia Egan Jones, American politician in the New Jersey General Assembly

== See also ==
- Pat Jones (disambiguation)
