= Xanadu Records =

American jazz record label

- Parent company: Sony Music Entertainment
- Founded: 1975
- Founder: Don Schlitten
- Defunct: 1999
- Status: Defunct
- Distributor: The Orchard
- Genre: Jazz
- Country of origin: U.S.
- Official website: xanadurecords.com

Xanadu Records was a jazz record label founded in 1975 by Don Schlitten. It was most active during the 1970s and 1980s and stopped recording in the 1990s. The catalogue was bought by emusic in 1999, but no new music was produced. In 2007, the catalogue was bought by The Orchard, which entered an agreement in 2015 with Elemental Music to reissue some of the catalog as the Xanadu Master Edition Series. The partnership planned to include albums by Kenny Barron, Bob Berg, Al Cohn, Sonny Criss, Joe Farrell, Barry Harris, Dexter Gordon, Albert Heath, Jimmy Heath, Duke Jordan, Charles McPherson, and Cecil Payne.

== Discography ==
#	Leader	Album
101	Allyn, David	Don't Look Back
102	Powell, Bud	Bud in Paris
103	Noto, Sam	Entrance!
104	Chambers, Paul/Hampton Hawes	East/West Controversy, The
105	Criss, Sonny	Saturday Morning
106	Hines, Earl & Roy Eldridge	At the Village Vanguard
107	Guy, Joe & Hot Lips Page	Trumpet Battle at Minton's
108	Pepper, Art	The Early Show
109	Farlow, Tal	Fuerst Set
110	Cohn, Al	Play It Now
111	Hawkins, Coleman	Thanks for the Memory
112	Guy, Joe & Billie Holiday	Harlem Odyssey
113	Harris, Barry	Barry Harris Plays Tadd Dameron
114	Bishop, Walter Jr.	Bish Bash
115	McPherson, Charles	Beautiful!
116	Raney, Jimmy	The Influence
117	Pepper, Art	Late Show, The
118	Heath, Jimmy	Picture of Heath
119	Farlow, Tal	Second Set
120	Various Artists	Bebop Revisited 1
121	Clark, Sonny	Memorial Album
122	Various Artists	International Jam Sessions
123	Various Artists	Sweets, Lips & Lots of Jazz
124	Various Artists	Bebop Revisited 2
125	Dorham, Kenny	The Kenny Dorham Memorial Album
126	Monterose, J. R.	Straight Ahead
127	Noto, Sam	Act One
128	Tucker, Mickey	Triplicity
129	Jones, Sam	Cello Again
130	Harris, Barry	Live in Tokyo
131	McPherson, Charles	Live in Tokyo
132	Raney, Jimmy	Live in Tokyo
133	Most, Sam	Mostly Flute
134	Edwards, Teddy	The Inimitable Teddy Edwards
135	Cuber, Ronnie	Cuber Libre!
136	Cohn, Al & Dexter Gordon	True Blue
137	Cohn, Al & Dexter Gordon	Silver Blue
138	Cohn, Al	Al Cohn's America
139	Coker, Dolo	Dolo!
140	Raney, Jimmy	Solo
141	Most, Sam	Flute Flight
142	Coker, Dolo	California Hard
143	Tucker, Mickey	Sojourn
144	Noto, Sam	Notes to You
145	Cohn, Al & Jimmy Rowles	Heavy Love
146	Gray, Wardell	Live in Hollywood
147	Coleman, Earl	Song for You, A
148	Pepper, Art & Shorty Rogers	Popo
149	McPherson, Charles	New Horizons
150	Jones, Sam	Changes & Things
151	Marsh, Warne	Live in Hollywood
152	Butler, Frank	The Stepper
153	Coker, Dolo	Third Down
154	Harris, Barry	Barry Harris Plays Barry Harris
155	Dunbar, Ted	Opening Remarks
156	Cuber, Ronnie	The Eleventh Day of Aquarius
157	Rowles, Jimmy	We Could Make Such Beautiful Music Together
158	Mitchell, Billy	The Colossus of Detroit
159	Berg, Bob	New Birth
160	Most, Sam	From the Attic of My Mind
161	Hawes, Hampton	Memorial Album
162	Various Artists	Xanadu at Montreux '78 1
163	Various Artists	Xanadu at Montreux '78 2
164	Various Artists	Xanadu at Montreux '78 3
165	Various Artists	Xanadu at Montreux '78 4
166	Drew, Kenny	Home Is Where the Soul Is
167	Drew, Kenny	For Sure!
168	Noto, Sam	Noto-riety
169	Butler, Frank	Wheelin' and Dealin'
170	McPherson, Charles	Free Bop!
171	Various Artists	Piano Players, The
172	Fruscella, Tony	Bebop Revisited 3
173	Most, Sam & Joe Farrell	Flute Talk
174	Farrell, Joe	Skateboard Park
175	Coleman, Earl	There's Something About an Old Love
176	Sprague, Peter	Dance of the Universe
177	Harris, Barry	Tokyo 1976 4/1,12,14/76
178	Coker, Dolo	All Alone
179	Cohn, Al	No Problem
180	Cohn, Al & Billy Mitchell	Xanadu in Africa
181	Dunbar, Ted	Secundum Artem
182	Mitchell, Billy	De Lawd's Blues
183	Sprague, Peter	The Path
184	Sprague, Peter	Bird Raga
185	Cohn, Al	Night Flight to Dakar
186	Eldridge, Roy	At Jerry Newman's
187	Mover, Bob	In the True Tradition
188	Barron, Kenny	Kenny Barron at the Piano
189	Hawkins, Coleman	Dutch Treat
190	Auld, Georgie	Homage
191	Harris, Bill	Memorial Album
192	Russell, Pee Wee	Over the Rainbow
193	Sprague, Peter	Message Sent on the Wind, The
194	Mover, Bob	Things Unseen!
195	Hawkins, Coleman	Jazz Tones
196	Dunbar, Ted	Jazz Guitarist
197	Green, Bennie/James Moody	Bebop Revisited 4
198	Kelly, Wynton	Blues on Purpose
199	Norvo, Red	Time in His Hands
200	Criss, Sonny	Memorial Album
201	Various Artists	Anniversary
202	Monk, Thelonious	Live at the Village Gate
203	Hines, Earl	57 Varieties
204	Thompson, Lucky	Brown Rose
205	Various Artists	Bebop Revisited 5
206	Haig, Al	Live in Hollywood
207	Eckstine, Billy	I Want to Talk About You
208	Various Artists	Bebop Revisited 6
209	Raney, Jimmy & Sonny Clark	Together
210	Gibbs, Terry	Bopstacle Course
211		
212		
213	Harris, Barry	The Bird of Red and Gold
