= First Flight Out =

Studio album by Charles McPherson
- Released: 1994
- Recorded: January 25–26, 1994
- Studio: Sound on Sound, New York City
- Genre: Jazz
- Length: 68:56
- Label: Arabesque; AJ-113
- Producer: Charles McPherson

Charles McPherson chronology
Illusions in Blue (1990)	First Flight Out (1994)	Come Play with Me (1995)

First Flight Out is an album by saxophonist Charles McPherson which was recorded in 1994 and released on the Arabesque label.

Professional ratings
Review scores
Source	Rating
AllMusic	4.5/5 stars

== Track listing ==
All compositions by Charles McPherson except where noted

1. "Lynns Grins" – 4:08
2. "Lizabeth" – 5:51
3. "Blues for Chuck" – 6:59
4. "Nostalgia in Times Square" (Charles Mingus) – 7:46
5. "Well, You Needn't" (Thelonious Monk) – 5:27
6. "7th Dimension" – 6:19
7. "Goodbye Pork Pie Hat" (Mingus) – 7:20
8. "Deep Night" (Charles Henderson, Rudy Vallée) – 6:04
9. "Portrait" (Mingus) – 5:08
10. "Karen" – 4:18
11. "My Funny Valentine" (Richard Rodgers, Lorenz Hart) – 5:40
12. "First Flight Out" – 3:51

== Personnel ==
- Charles McPherson – alto saxophone
- Tom Harrell – trumpet, flugelhorn
- Michael Weiss – piano
- Peter Washington – double bass
- Victor Lewis – drums
