= Diane Hubka =

American jazz guitarist and vocalist

- Born: Maryland, U.S.
- Genres: Jazz
- Occupations: Vocalist, musician
- Instrument: Guitar
- Years active: 1998–present
- Website: www.dianehubka.com

Diane Hubka is an American jazz guitarist and vocalist.

== Career ==
Hubka was born in Pleasantville, New York and took violin lessons at age 6–7, then trombone age 9, and guitar when she was 11. She learned to play folk songs fingerstyle. In 1970, the family moved to Cumberland, Maryland. During the 1970s, her influences were The Beatles, Joni Mitchell, James Taylor, Crosby, Stills, Nash & Young, and the Allman Brothers. She was introduced to jazz in college by her guitar teacher, Bill Bittner, and joined his quartet as a vocalist. In 1980, she moved to Washington, D.C. and performed in local clubs including Blues Alley and Charlie's Georgetown. In 1985, she moved to New York City, where she studied voice, guitar, and piano with Howard Alden, Gene Bertoncini, Connie Crothers, Harold Danko, Barry Harris, and Sheila Jordan. For many years, she performed with groups in New York City and Washington, D.C.. In the 1990s, she worked as a vocalist accompanying herself on jazz guitar. In 2002, she started playing seven-string guitar.

She recorded her debut album, Haven't We Met? (Challenge, 1998), with Lee Konitz, Frank Kimbrough, and John Hart. The album was nominated Best Recording Debut of the Year by the Jazz Journalists Association.

You Inspire Me (VSOJAZ, 2001) was recorded with seven guitarists: Gene Bertoncini, Paul Bollenback, John Hart, Romero Lubambo, Bucky Pizzarelli, Frank Vignola, and Jack Wilkins. On her album West Coast Strings, she was supported by another group of established guitarists: David Eastlee, Ron Escheté, Mimi Fox, Larry Koonse, John Pisano, Peter Sprague, Anthony Wilson, and Barry Zweig.

== Discography ==
- Haven't We Met? (Challenge, 1998)
- Look No Further (A Records, 2000)
- You Inspire Me (VSOJAZ, 2001)
- Diane Hubka Goes to the Movies (18th & Vine, 2007)
- I Like It Here: Live in Tokyo (SSJ, 2008)
- West Coast Strings (SSJ, 2013)
