= Crisscraft =

Studio album by Sonny Criss
- Released: 1975
- Recorded: February 24, 1975, Wally Heider Studios, Hollywood, California
- Genre: Jazz
- Length: 32:45
- Label: Muse; MR 5068
- Producer: Bob Porter

Sonny Criss chronology
I'll Catch the Sun! (1969)	Crisscraft (1975)	Saturday Morning (1975)

Crisscraft is a 1975 album by jazz saxophonist Sonny Criss, originally released on the Muse label, and later reissued on 32 Jazz.

== Reception ==
Professional ratings
Review scores
Source	Rating
AllMusic	4.5/5 stars
The Penguin Guide to Jazz Recordings	3.5/4 stars

AllMusic awarded the album 4½ stars with its review by Scott Yanow calling it "one of the very best Sonny Criss albums... Criss, who had not recorded as a leader in six years, was really ready for this session, making this his definitive set to get".

== Track listing ==
1. "The Isle of Celia" (Horace Tapscott) – 10:28
2. "Blues in My Heart" (Benny Carter, Irving Mills) – 5:59
3. "This is for Benny" (Tapscott) – 4:53
4. "All Night Long" (Curtis Lewis) – 3:59
5. "Crisscraft" (Sonny Criss) – 7:08

== Personnel ==
- Sonny Criss – alto saxophone
- Dolo Coker – piano
- Ray Crawford – guitar
- Larry Gales – bass
- Jimmie Smith – drums
