= Patrick Stanfield Jones =

American singer-songwriter

- Genres: Country rock, rockabilly, jazz, blues
- Occupations: Singer, songwriter, musician, actor
- Instrument: Guitar
- Years active: 19??–present
- Label: Motéma Music
- Website: patjones.tv

Patrick Stanfield Jones is an American musician, producer, arranger, and singer-songwriter whose music is a mix of rock, jazz, folk, and blues.

He is a brother of jazz percussionist Kevin Jones, and they have performed and recorded together. He has worked with Isley, Jasper, Isley and Whitney Houston. He has been a member of the touring casts of Jesus Christ Superstar and Oh, Calcutta! He performed the music of Ned Rorem's song cycle Songs of Sadness, and Romeo and Juliet at Merkin recital hall in Manhattan on April 24, 2005. He has performed on more than 20 albums.

Jones' solo CDs include A Heart and an Open Road (Motéma Music, 2011), Pat Jones Band (1995), and the EP Mystery Prize (2004).

He has been compared to Carl Perkins, but with a more modern sensibility.

== Band ==
- Drummer David McMillen
- Bassist Joe Riccio
- Saxophonist Colin Pohl
