= Sonny Criss =

American jazz saxophonist (1927–1977)

- Born: William Criss; October 23, 1927; Memphis, Tennessee, U.S.
- Died: November 19, 1977 (aged 50) Los Angeles, California, U.S.
- Genres: Jazz, bebop
- Occupations: Musician, composer
- Instruments: Alto saxophone, soprano saxophone

William "Sonny" Criss (October 23, 1927 – November 19, 1977) was an American jazz musician.

An alto saxophonist of prominence during the bebop era of jazz, he was one of many players influenced by Charlie Parker.

== Biography ==
William Mansfield Turner, known to the world as Sonny Criss, was born in Memphis, Tennessee, United States on October 23, 1927. He moved to Los Angeles with his mother at the age of 15. He played music all through high school and then went on to play in various bands including Howard McGhee's, which also featured Charlie Parker, Sonny's idol.

However, Criss was much more than just a Charlie Parker clone. He developed his own sound, drenched in the blues, as his ability on the instrument continued to develop. He played with many top musicians on the West Coast, and was a part of some recordings with Johnny Otis and Billy Eckstine.

His first major break came in 1947, on a number of jam sessions arranged by jazz impresario Norman Granz. In 1956 he was signed to Imperial Records, based in New York, and recorded a series of albums including Jazz U.S.A , Go Man! and Sonny Criss Plays Cole Porter featuring pianist Sonny Clark. Capitol, which owned the master recordings, reissued them as a double-CD set on their Blue Note imprint in 2000. Criss also recorded At the Crossroads with pianist Wynton Kelly.

Prestige signed Criss in 1965, and it was during that time that he developed a very close relationship with Producer Don Schlitten. Under Schlitten's watch, Sonny recorded several albums, including a big band album, "Sonny's Dream," which featured arrangements by Horace Tapscott. Later sessions in 1975 were recorded for Muse and Impulse, including "Crisscraft," "Warm 'N Sonny," and "The Joy of Sax."

There was another side to Sonny Criss that most people never knew. He was an extremely kind person, and loved children. During his time in Los Angeles, he played jazz for over 25,000 kids, volunteering his time for them. He also taught two private students, Sid Levy and Dylan Cramer, both of whom developed a sound reminiscent of his brilliance.

In 1977, as he was preparing to tour Japan, Sonny was stricken with stomach cancer. Distraught, Sonny committed suicide on November 19, 1977. His funeral was held in a church in Los Angeles, filled to overflowing with people. He never married, but had one son, Steven Criss.

== Discography ==
=== As leader ===
- California Boppin' (Fresh Sound, 1947)
- Intermission Riff (Pablo, 1951 [1988])
- Jazz USA (Imperial, 1956)
- Go Man! (Imperial, 1956)
- Sonny Criss Plays Cole Porter (Imperial, 1956)
- At the Crossroads with Sonny Criss (Peacock, 1959) reissued on CD as Sonny Criss Quartet Featuring Wynton Kelly (Fresh Sound, 2001)
- Criss Cross (Imperial, 1963) compilation
- Mr. Blues Pour Flirter (Brunswick [France] Records, 1963)
- This Is Criss! (Prestige, 1966)
- Portrait of Sonny Criss (Prestige, 1967)
- Up, Up And Away (Prestige, 1967)
- The Beat Goes On! (Prestige, 1968)
- Sonny's Dream (Birth of the New Cool) (Prestige, 1968)
- Rockin' in Rhythm (Prestige, 1969)
- I'll Catch the Sun! (Prestige, 1969)
- The Best Of Sonny Criss: Hits of the '60's (Prestige, 1970) compilation
- Live in Italy (Fresh Sound, 1974 [1987])
- Saturday Morning (Xanadu, 1975)
- Crisscraft (Muse, 1975)
- Out of Nowhere (Muse, 1976)
- Warm & Sonny (Impulse!, 1976)
- The Joy of Sax (Impulse!, 1977)
- The Sonny Criss Memorial Album (Xanadu, 1984) recorded 1947/1950/1952/1965

=== As sideman ===
With Dexter Gordon

- The Hunt (Savoy, 1947) also on Jazz Concert West Coast, Volumes 1-3 (Savoy)

With Wardell Gray All Stars

- Wardell Gray Memorial, Vol. 2 (Prestige, 1950)

With Charlie Parker and Chet Baker

- Inglewood Jam (Fresh Sound, 1952)

With Buddy Rich

- The Wailing Buddy Rich (Norgran, 1955)
- The Swinging Buddy Rich (Norgran, 1955)
- The Cinch - quintet Live at Birdland - (1958)

With Lou Rawls and Onzy Matthews Big Band

- Tobacco Road (Capitol, 1963)

With Onzy Matthews

- Sounds For The '60's (Capitol, 1966)

With Esther Phillips and Onzy Matthews Orchestra

- Confessin' The Blues (Atlantic, 1966)

With Hampton Hawes All Stars

- Live At Memory Lane (Fresh Sound, 1970)
