= Ted Dunbar =

American jazz guitarist (1937-1998)

- Born: Earl Theodore Dunbar; January 17, 1937; Port Arthur, Texas, U.S.
- Died: May 29, 1998 (aged 61) New Brunswick, New Jersey
- Genres: Jazz
- Occupation: Musician
- Instrument: Guitar
- Label: Xanadu

Earl Theodore Dunbar (January 17, 1937 – May 29, 1998) was an American jazz guitarist, composer, and educator.

== Career ==
Born in Port Arthur, Texas, Dunbar trained as a pharmacist at Texas Southern University, but by the 1970s he only did pharmacy work part-time. He was also a trained numerologist and studied other aspects of mysticism. He became interested in jazz at the age of seven. During the 1950s, he joined several groups while studying pharmacy at Texas Southern University.

During the 1960s, he worked as a substitute for Wes Montgomery. Dunbar collaborated with Gil Evans, Roy Haynes, Jimmy Heath, Sonny Rollins, McCoy Tyner, and Tony Williams. In 1972 he became one of the first jazz professors at Rutgers University and taught Kevin Eubanks, Vernon Reid, and Peter Bernstein. At one point he received accolades from Ebony and Down Beat.

He wrote a series of books on tonal convergence that are inspired and related to the Lydian chromatic concept. The centerpiece of this series is entitled A System of Tonal Convergence for Improvisors Composers and Arrangers.

Dunbar died of a stroke in 1998.

== Discography ==
=== As leader ===
- Opening Remarks (Xanadu, 1978)
- Secundum Artem (Xanadu, 1980)
- In Tandem with Kenny Barron (Muse, 1980)
- Music for Violin & Jazz Quartet with NY5 (Jam, 1981)
- Jazz Guitarist (Xanadu, 1982)
- Gentle Time Alone (SteepleChase, 1992)
- A Tribute to Wes Montgomery Vol. I with Project G-7 (Evidence, 1993)
- A Tribute to Wes Montgomery Vol. II with Project G-7 (Evidence, 1993)

=== As sideman ===
With Frank Foster

- Bursting Out! (Challenge, 1978)
- Chiquito Loco (Bingow, 1979)
- Shiny Stockings (Challenge, 1979)
- A Blues Ain't Nothing But a Trip (Bingow, 1981)
- Swing! (Challenge, 1998)

With others

- Gene Ammons, My Way (Prestige, 1971)
- Kenny Barron, Peruvian Blue (Muse, 1974)
- Hamiet Bluiett, Live at the Village Vanguard (Soul Note, 1997)
- Zachary Breaux, Uptown Groove (Zebra, 1997)
- Earl Coleman, There's Something About An Old Love with (Xanadu, 1983)
- Norman Connors, Dark of Light (Cobblestone, 1973)
- Nathan Davis, I'm A Fool to Want You (Tomorrow, 1995)
- Richard Davis, Harvest (Muse, 1979)
- Lou Donaldson, Pretty Things (Blue Note, 1970)
- Gil Evans, Svengali (Atlantic, 1973)
- Albert Heath, Kwanza (The First) (Muse, 1974)
- Willis Jackson, West Africa (Muse, 1974)
- J. J. Johnson, Vivian (Concord Jazz, 1992)
- Galt MacDermot, The Nucleus (Kilmarnock, 1971)
- Susannah McCorkle, As Time Goes by (CBS/Sony, 1987)
- Charles Mingus, Me Myself An Eye (Atlantic, 1979)
- Charles Mingus, Something Like a Bird (Atlantic, 1980)
- Buddy Montgomery, Ties of Love (Landmark, 1987)
- David "Fathead" Newman, House of David (Atlantic, 1967)
- David "Fathead" Newman, Resurgence! (Muse, 1981)
- Don Patterson, The Return of Don Patterson (Muse, 1974)
- Bernard Purdie, Purdie Good! (Prestige, 1971)
- Sam Rivers, Sizzle (Impulse!, 1976)
- Charlie Rouse, Cinnamon Flower (Douglas, 1977)
- David Schnitter, Thundering (Muse, 1979)
- David Schnitter, Glowing (Muse, 1981)
- Janis Siegel, Experiment in White (Wounded Bird, 1982)
- Johnny "Hammond" Smith, What's Going On (Prestige, 1971)
- Billy Taylor, The Jazzmobile Allstars (Taylor-Made, 1989)
- Mel Tormé, Night at the Concord Pavilion (Concord, 1990)
- Mel Tormé, Recorded Live at the Fujitsu-Concord Jazz Festival in Japan '90 (Concord Jazz, 1991)
- Mickey Tucker, Blues in Five Dimensions (SteepleChase, 1990)
- Mickey Tucker, The Crawl (Muse, 1980)
- McCoy Tyner, Asante (Blue Note, 1974)
- Frank Wess, Dear Mr. Basie (Concord Jazz, 1990)
- Frank Wess, Entre Nous (Concord Jazz, 1991)
- Randy Weston, Volcano Blues (Verve, 1993)
- Joe Williams, That Holiday Feelin' (Verve, 1990)
- Tony Williams, Ego (Polydor, 1971)
