= Charles McPherson (musician) =

American jazz alto saxophonist (born 1939)

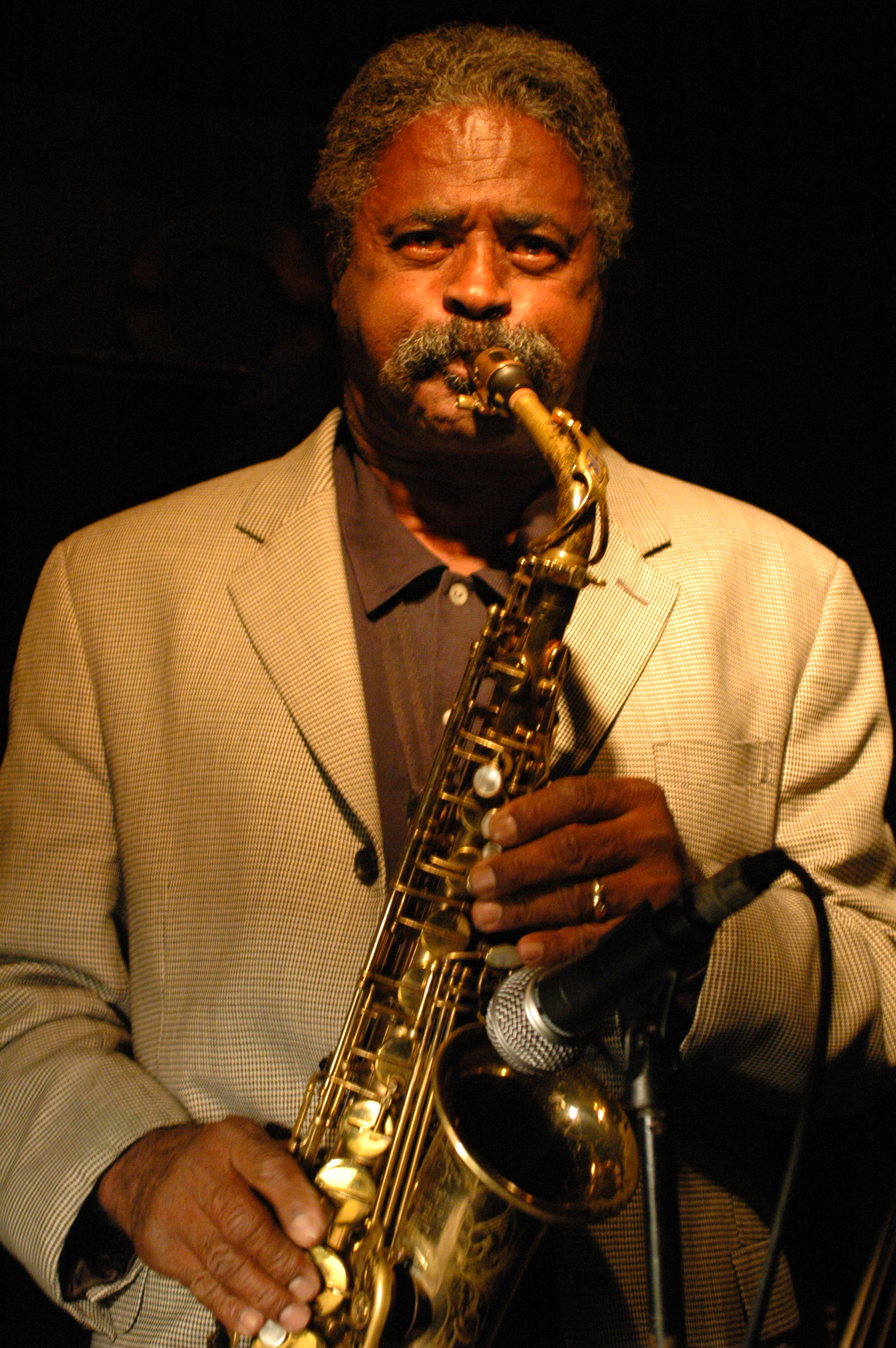

Background information
- Born: July 24, 1939 (age 87); Joplin, Missouri, U.S.
- Genre: Jazz
- Occupation: Musician
- Instrument: Alto saxophone
- Years active: 1960–present
- Labels: Prestige, Mainstream, Xanadu, Arabesque
- Website: charlesmcpherson.com

Charles McPherson (born July 24, 1939) is an American jazz alto saxophonist born in Joplin, Missouri, United States; raised in Detroit, Michigan; and now lives in San Diego, California. He worked intermittently with Charles Mingus from 1960 to 1974, and as a performer leading his own groups.

McPherson also was commissioned to help record ensemble renditions of pieces from Charlie Parker, on the 1988 soundtrack for the film Bird.

In 2020, the JazzTimes magazine readers' poll named McPherson Artist of the Year, and also selected his album Jazz Dance Suites as Best New Release.

== Discography ==
=== As leader ===
- Bebop Revisited! (Prestige, 1965)
- Con Alma! (Prestige, 1965)
- The Quintet/Live! (Prestige, 1967)
- From This Moment On! (Prestige, 1968)
- Horizons (Prestige, 1969)
- McPherson's Mood (Prestige, 1969)
- Charles McPherson (Mainstream, 1971)
- Siku Ya Bibi (Day of the Lady) (Mainstream, 1972)
- Today's Man (Mainstream, 1973)
- Beautiful! (Xanadu, 1975)
- Live in Tokyo (Xanadu, 1976)
- New Horizons (Xanadu, 1978)
- Free Bop! (Xanadu, 1979)
- The Prophet (Discovery, 1983)
- Follow the Bouncing Ball (Discovery, 1989)
- Illusions in Blue (Chazz Jazz, 1990)
- First Flight Out (Arabesque, 1994)
- Come Play With Me (Arabesque, 1995)
- Live at Vartan Jazz (Vartan, 1997)
- Manhattan Nocturne (Arabesque, 1998)
- But Beautiful (Venus, 2004)
- Charles McPherson with Strings (Clarion, 2005)
- The Journey (Capri Records, 2015)
- Jazz Dance Suites (Chazz Mack, 2020)
- Reverence (Smoke Sessions, 2024)

=== As sideman ===
With Barry Harris

- Newer Than New (Riverside, 1961)
- Bull's Eye! (Prestige, 1968)
- Stay Right with It (Milestone, 1978)
- Tokyo 1976 (Xanadu, 1980)

With Charles Mingus

- Mingus (Candid, 1961)
- Mingus at Monterey (Jazz Workshop, 1965)
- Music Written for Monterey 1965 (Jazz Workshop, 1966)
- My Favorite Quintet (Fantasy, 1964)
- Let My Children Hear Music (Columbia, 1972)
- Charles Mingus and Friends in Concert (Columbia, 1973)
- Mingus at Carnegie Hall (Atlantic, 1974)
- The Complete Town Hall Concert (United Artists, 1983)
- The Complete Candid Recordings of Charles Mingus (Mosaic, 1985)
- Shoes of the Fisherman's Wife (Columbia, 1988)
- Charles Mingus Sextet Paris, TNP October 28th 1970 (Ulysse Musique, 1988)
- Live in Chateauvallon, 1972 (France's Concert, 1989)
- Charles Mingus in Paris: The Complete America Session (Sunnyside, 2007)
- Pithycanthropus Erectus (America, 1971)
- Reincarnation of a Lovebird (Prestige, 1974)
- Something Like a Bird (Atlantic, 1980)

With others

- Pepper Adams, Pepper Adams Plays the Compositions of Charlie Mingus (Workshop Jazz, 1964)
- Toshiko Akiyoshi, Just Be Bop (Discomate [Japan], 1980)
- Ray Appleton, Killer Ray Rides Again (Sharp Nine, 1996)
- Jeannie & Jimmy Cheatham, Sweet Baby Blues (Concord Jazz, 1985)
- Kenny Drew, For Sure! (Xanadu, 1981)
- Clint Eastwood, Eastwood After Hours: Live at Carnegie Hall (Warner Bros., 1997)
- Art Farmer, The Many Faces of Art Farmer (Scepter, 1964)
- Lionel Hampton, At Newport '78 (Timeless, 1980)
- Eddie Jefferson, Come Along with Me (Prestige, 1969)
- Eddie Jefferson, There I Go Again (Prestige, 1980)
- LaMont Johnson, New York Exile (Masterscores, 1980)
- Bobby Jones, Arrival of Bobby Jones (Cobblestone, 1972)
- Sam Jones, Cello Again (Xanadu, 1976)
- Dave Pike, Bluebird (Timeless, 1989)
- Jimmy Raney, The Complete Jimmy Raney in Tokyo (Xanadu, 1988)
- Red Rodney, Bird Lives! (Muse, 1974)
- Sonny Stitt & Don Patterson, Sonny Stitt/Don Patterson Vol. 2 (Prestige, 1998)
- Charles Tolliver, Impact (Strata-East, 1976)
- Charlie Parker, Bird (CBS, 1988)
- Don Patterson, Boppin' & Burnin' (Prestige, 1968)
- Don Patterson, Funk You! (Prestige, 1968)
- Larry Vuckovich, City Sounds, Village Voices (Palo Alto, 1982)
- Larry Vuckovich, Blues for Red (Hothouse, 1985)
- Dee Dee Bridgewater, Prelude to a Kiss: The Duke Ellington Album (Phillips, 1996)
