= Don Schlitten =

American jazz record producer (1932–2026)

Don Schlitten (March 4, 1932 – February 9, 2026) was an American jazz record producer.

Signal Records was founded in 1955 by Jules Colomby (assisted by Schlitten) with Harold Goldberg. His credits for Signal included work with Duke Jordan, Gigi Gryce, and Red Rodney. Signal was sold to Savoy Records in the late 1950s, and after this, Schlitten worked as a freelance producer through the 1960s, including for a period, at Prestige Records. He and Joe Fields co-founded Cobblestone Records in 1972, producing Sonny Stitt and the Newport Jazz Festival 1972 releases from the label. He and Fields also worked together at Muse Records and Onyx Records.

Fields and Schlitten ceased working together in the mid-1970s; Fields continued at Muse, and Schlitten founded Xanadu Records, where he produced Barry Harris, Al Cohn, and Charles McPherson, among others. He also oversaw the reissue of many early bebop sessions.

Aside from production work, Schlitten had extensive credits as a writer of liner notes.

Schlitten died on February 9, 2026, at the age of 93.
