= Paul H. Brown =

American jazz musician

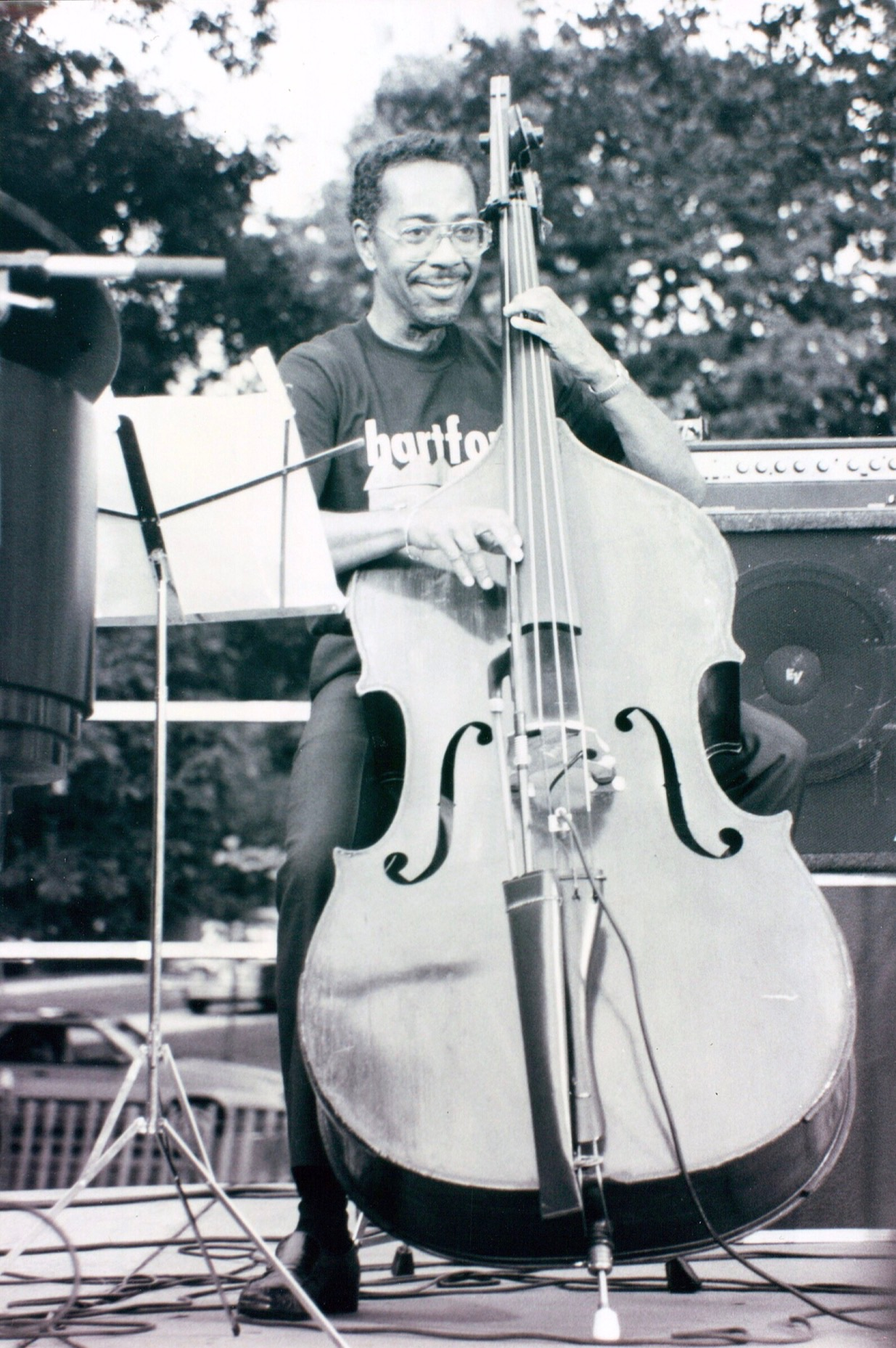
Paul Brown on bandstand in Bushnell Park, Hartford, CT, summer 1994

Paul Brown "PB" (March 6, 1934 – May 6, 2016), was an American jazz bassist. He was the founder of the Monday Night Jazz Series in Hartford, Connecticut, which was recognized by the Library of Congress as the oldest and longest-running free festival for jazz in the United States and featured jazz greats such as Cannonball Adderley, McCoy Tyner, Herbie Hancock, Roy Haynes, Ron Carter, Thelonious Monk, Tito Puente, Woody Shaw, Sun Ra, Bobby Hutcherson, Roy Haynes, Freddie Hubbard, stanley Clarke Slide Hampton Horace Silver, Hugh Masekela, Gene Rodgers (a close family friend and godfather to Paul’s youngest child), and the "MJQ" Modern Jazz Quartet just to name a few. Brown also founded The Greater Hartford Festival of Jazz in 1992 to commemorate 25 years of the Monday night jazz series which in 2016, the Hartford Jazz Society renamed "Paul Brown Monday Night Jazz". He was co-founder of Hartford's Artists Collective, Inc.

== Career ==
Brown was born in Baltimore, Maryland on March 6, 1934. He grew up in Severn, Maryland and studied at the Peabody Conservatory of Music before attending Morgan State University and Johns Hopkins University as a pre-med student. He left school because of lack of money and his desire to pursue a career in music.

He began his professional music career playing trumpet, touring with, Mickey Fields, Lloyd Price, and substituting in the bands of Count Basie and Duke Ellington. He worked with Flink Johnson Combo, Jimmy Scott, LaVern Baker, Mickey & Sylvia, Clyde McPhatter, The Drifters, The Platters, and Fats Domino.

After switching to bass, he began touring with the Flink Johnson Combo when he met saxophonist Jackie McLean. He moved to Hartford in the early 1960s to be close to New York City where he played in jazz clubs and worked as a studio musician. In 1967, his desire to help quell the civil unrest of the mid 1960s contributed to the founding of the longest-running, outdoor, free jazz concert in the United States.

The Artists Collective, Inc. was founded in 1970 in Hartford by Brown, Jackie McLean, his wife "Dollie" Clarice McLean, dancer Cheryl Smith, and visual artist Ionis Martin. The Artists Collective has been responsible for the tutelage of students including bassist Luques Curtis, saxophonist Jimmy Greene, trumpeter Josh Evans, and bassist Dezron Douglas. Brown also taught at the University of Hartford and the Greater Hartford Academy of the Arts for over twenty years. During that time, he and bassist/music producer, Masakazu Fujii organized a foreign exchange student program with Japan.

Brown worked with multiple jazz artists including George Benson, Max Roach, Bobby Hebb, Joe Henderson, Lou Donaldson, Grady Tate, Kenny Burrell, Philly Joe Jones, Walter Bishop Jr., Anita Bryant, Betty Carter, Junior Cook, Bill Cosby, during Cosby’s years with the Ebony Fashion Fair, Dexter Gordon, Al Haig, Bill Hardman, Barry Harris, Freddie Hubbard, Cab Calloway, Peter Nero, Larry Rivers, Hilton Ruiz, Nina Simone, Frank Sinatra, Mickey Tucker, Curtis Fuller, Gene Rodgers, Melba Liston, Dakota Staton, and Sarah Vaughan. Brown toured with Tyler Perry during Perry's Chitlin' Circuit years. He recorded his own albums with George Coleman, Houston Person, and John Stubblefield. Brown died at the age of 82 on May 6, 2016.

== Awards and honors ==
- Golden Rule Award, JCPenney, 2001
- New England Jazz Alliance Unsung Heroes Award, 2003
- Heartbeat Ensemble Street Performance Award and Latter Rain Christian Fellowship Appreciation Award, 2006,
- The Greater Hartford Festival of Jazz Community Award, 2007
- Paul Brown Day on November 13 in state of CT in 2009
- Juneteenth Award 2013
- Greater Hartford Festival of Jazz, Above and Beyond Award, posthumously 2016

== Discography ==
As leader

- 1996: Speak Low (Brownstone)
- 1998: Meets the Three Tenors (Brownstone) - with Houston Person, George Coleman

With Walter Bishop Jr.

- 1988: Just in Time
- 1989: Ode to Bird
- 1993: Speak Low Again

With Bill Hardman

- 1981: Politely (Muse)
- 1989: What's Up (SteepleChase)

With George Benson

- 1967: The George Benson Cookbook

With Bobby Hebb

- 1966: Sunny

With others

- 1984: The East Thirteenth Street Band, Larry Rivers
- 1984: Cross Currents, Hilton Ruiz
- 1987: Viewpoints and Vibrations, Steve Turre
- 1993: 9 Standards (Quartet) 1993, Anthony Braxton
- 1995: Going Forth, Fred Simmons
- 1998: Season of Souls, Tulku
- 2000: Family, Friends & Music, Timmy Shepherd
- 2002: Dreamworld, special guest Curtis Fuller
- 2004: Left Alone, Lady Kim
- 2005: From The Moon, Lloyd Chisholm
- 2006: Bevop Meets Bass Thru The Neo Bass Ensemble, featuring Lisle Atkinson
- 2009: G2us Newyork rec.

== Notes ==
- Troup, Stuart (Apr 26, 1985). "A Night in the Spotlight for Paul Brown", New York Newsday.
- Seremet, Pat (Feb 4, 2000). "Brown Makes a Point: Hartford's Jazz Goes to D.C.", Hartford Courant.
- McNally, Owen (July 26, 1992). "Paul Brown, Hartford's jazzman", Hartford Courant.
- McNally, Owen (June 26, 1977). "Jazz Fest in the Park Books Star Players"
- [Hartford Hero Paul Brown Puts City In Jazz Spotlight] (9 May 2016), Hartford Hero Paul Brown Put Jazz In City Spotlight
- Paul Brown Monday Night Jazz – 2018 – Hartford Jazz Society
- Hartford Pays Homage to Paul Brown, Longtime Pillar of the City’s Jazz Community

https://www.courant.com/obituaries/paul-h-brown-hartford-ct/
