= Chasin' the Bird =

Chasin' the Bird may refer to:

- "Chasin' the Bird" (song), a Charlie Parker composition
- Chasin' the Bird (Barry Harris album), 1962
