= For the Moment (Barry Harris album) =

Live album by Barry Harris
- Released: 1985
- Recorded: March 2, 1984
- Venue: Jazz Cultural Theatre, NYC
- Genre: Jazz
- Length: 77:01 CD release with additional tracks
- Label: Uptown; UP 27.20
- Producer: Mark Feldman M.D, Robert E. Sunenblick M.D.

Barry Harris chronology
The Bird of Red and Gold (1982)	For the Moment (1985)	Live at Maybeck Recital Hall, Volume Twelve (1990)

For the Moment is a live album by pianist Barry Harris which was recorded in New York in 1984 and released on the Uptown label the following year.

== Reception ==
Professional ratings
Review scores
Source	Rating
AllMusic	4/5 stars
The Penguin Guide to Jazz Recordings	3/4 stars

In his review on Allmusic, Scott Yanow called it "A delightful and enthusiastic set" and stated "Throughout his career, pianist Barry Harris has kept the spirit of bebop and the music of Bud Powell and Thelonious Monk alive in his joyous and creative playing".

== Track listing ==
All compositions by Barry Harris except where noted.

1. "I Love Lucy" (Eliot Daniel, Harold Adamson) – 5:56
2. "My Heart Stood Still" (Richard Rodgers, Lorenz Hart) – 5:59
3. "Bean and the Boys" (Coleman Hawkins) – 4:43 Additional track on CD reissue
4. "To Monk with Love" – 5:50
5. "For the Moment" – 2:55
6. "Chico the Man" – 7:09
7. "Monk Medley: Reflections/Light Blue/Well, You Needn't/Rhythm-a-Ning" (Thelonious Monk) – 8:31
8. "Shaw Nuff" (Charlie Parker) – 7:35 Additional track on CD reissue
9. "7-9-3-4-0" – 5:02 Additional track on CD reissue
10. "Save Some for Later" – 6:15
11. "Looking Glass" – 6:21
12. "To Monk With Love" – 5:03 Additional track on CD reissue
13. "One More Blues" – 6:09 Additional track on CD reissue

== Personnel ==
- Barry Harris – piano
- Rufus Reid – bass
- Leroy Williams - drums
