= Howard Rees =

Canadian jazz pianist and educator (born 1954)

- Born: Howard Rees; February 21, 1954 (age 72)
- Origin: Toronto, Ontario, Canada
- Genres: Jazz; Bop
- Occupations: Pianist, Educator
- Instruments: Piano, Double bass
- Website: http://www.jazzworkshops.com

Howard Rees is a Canadian jazz pianist and educator. He has performed with jazz musicians Charles McPherson, Ray Drummond, Barry Harris, Akira Tana, Leroy Williams, Earl May, Kenny Burrell and Jaki Byard. He is the founder of Canada's oldest independent jazz school, the "Howard Rees' Jazz Workshops", and continues to teach in Canada and abroad.

== Early life and education ==
Rees apprenticed with the jazz pianist Barry Harris from 1978 to 1984 in New York City.

== Career ==
In 1984, Rees founded the "Howard Rees' Jazz Workshops", a Toronto-based jazz school. The school, which has attracted over 2,500 students from around the world, is Canada's oldest independent jazz school.

In 2005 Rees cofounded the Toronto organization Art of Jazz. As a member of its board of directors, he helped plan the Art of Jazz Celebration, an annual event which takes place at The Distillery on Toronto. He also helped to develop the Art of Jazz Community Voices, a 240-member choral group of young jazz singers, which gave a performance at Music Hall Theatre, and later at Roy Thomson Hall, in 2011. He also directs the Toronto Jazz Chorus.

In 2008, Rees founded the "We Are One Jazz Project", a mentorship project that matches master musicians with children from lower income neighbourhoods. Through a partnership with the Toronto District School Board, students ages 9–12 attend weekly rehearsals, an finally take part in a public performance at the Toronto Centre for the Performing Arts, featuring a 400-voice children's choir, a big band, a string section, and a number of guest artists. In 2018 WAO (We Are One) has launched We Are One BELLEVILLE with the concert for the 2018-19 year being at Centennial Secondary School (Belleville, Ontario).

About 300 children participate in the We Are One Jazz Project each year.

=== Publications and online instruction ===
Rees has published several instructional volumes and videos about Harris' method.

In 2011, Rees launched the website "Jazz School Online", featuring over 200 video lessons.
