= Newer Than New =

Studio album by Barry Harris Quintet
- Released: 1961
- Recorded: September 28, 1961; New York City
- Genre: Jazz
- Length: 39:57
- Label: Riverside; RLP 413
- Producer: Orrin Keepnews

Barry Harris chronology
Listen to Barry Harris (1961)	Newer Than New (1961)	Chasin' the Bird (1962)

Newer Than New is an album by pianist Barry Harris recorded in 1961 and released on the Riverside label.

== Reception ==
Professional ratings
Review scores
Source	Rating
Down Beat	4/5 stars
Allmusic	4.5/5 stars
The Penguin Guide to Jazz Recordings	2.5/4 stars

Allmusic awarded the album 4½ stars with its review by Ronny D. Lankforth, Jr. stating, "the music still sounds fresh and exciting... Jazz styles, like all styles, come and go, but great music like Newer Than New transcends styles".

== Track listing ==
All compositions by Barry Harris except as indicated

1. "Mucho Dinero" - 3:44
2. "Easy to Love" (Cole Porter) - 4:50
3. "Burgundy" - 7:01
4. "The Last One" - 4:57
5. "Anthropology" (Dizzy Gillespie, Charlie Parker) - 4:17
6. "I Didn't Know What Time It Was" (Lorenz Hart, Richard Rodgers) - 4:12
7. "Make Haste" - 5:39
8. "Nightingale" (George Rosner, Fred Wise) - 5:17

== Personnel ==
- Barry Harris - piano
- Lonnie Hillyer - trumpet
- Charles McPherson - alto saxophone
- Ernie Farrow - bass
- Clifford Jarvis - drums
