= Explosion! The Sound of Slide Hampton =

Studio album by Slide Hampton
- Released: 1962
- Recorded: July 26 and August 28, 1962; NYC
- Genre: Jazz
- Label: Atlantic; LP 1396
- Producer: Tom Dowd and Phil Iichle

Slide Hampton chronology
Drum Suite (1962)	Explosion! The Sound of Slide Hampton (1962)	Exodus (1962)

Explosion! The Sound of Slide Hampton is an album by American jazz trombonist, composer and arranger Slide Hampton which was released on the Atlantic label in 1962.

== Reception ==
Professional ratings
Review scores
Source	Rating
Allmusic	3/5 stars

Allmusic gave the album 3 stars.

== Track listing ==
All compositions by Slide Hampton, except as indicated.

1. "Revival" - 2:22
2. "Maria" (Leonard Bernstein, Stephen Sondheim) - 2:22
3. "Delilah" (Henry Manners, Jimmy Shirl) - 3:56
4. "Begin the Beguine" (Cole Porter) - 2:30
5. "Your Cheatin' Heart" (Hank Williams) - 2:58
6. "Spanish Flier" - 3:22
7. "Bye Bye Love" (Boudleaux Bryant, Felice Bryant) - 2:55
8. "Love Letters" (Victor Young, Edward Heyman) - 3:26
9. "Slide's Blues" - 5:26
- Recorded in NYC on July 26, 1962 (tracks 2, 4, 6 & 9) and August 28, 1962 (tracks 1, 3, 5, 7, 8)

== Personnel ==
- Slide Hampton - trombone, arranger
- Johnny Bello, Chet Ferretti, Jerry Tyree - trumpet
- Benny Jacobs-El - trombone
- Joe Farrell - tenor saxophone
- Jay Cameron, (1, 3, 5, 7, 8) Ronnie Cuber (2, 4, 6 & 9) - baritone saxophone
- Walter Davis, Jr., (1, 3, 5, 7, 8) Horace Parlan (2, 4, 6 & 9) - piano
- Bob Cranshaw - bass
- Vinnie Ruggiero - drums
- Willie Bobo - congas (2, 4, 6 & 9)
