= West 54 Records =

American jazz record label (1970s)

West 54 Records was a jazz record label active during the late 1970s.

== Discography ==
WLW	Artist	Album	Personnel	Year	Other issues
8000	Red Richards	Soft Buns	Solo piano	1978	
8001	Slide Hampton	World of Trombones	Douglas Purviance, Janice Robinson, Steve Turre, Leroy Williams, Albert Dailey, Ray Drummond, Curtis Fuller	1979	Black Lion
8002	Carrie Smith	Carrie Smith	Richard Wyands, George Duvivier, Art Farmer, Richie Pratt, Budd Johnson	1978	
8003	Roland Hanna	A Gift from the Magi	Solo piano	1978	
8004	John Hicks	After the Morning	Solo piano, duo and trio	1979	
8005	Red Richards	In a Mellow Tone	Norris Turney, Buck Clayton, Johnny Williams, Jr. (bass), Ronnie Cole (drums)	1979	
8006	Charles Davis	Dedicated to Tadd	Tex Allen, Clifford Adams, Kenny Barron, Walter Booker, Billy Hart	1979	
8007	Jasmine	Jasmine	Bill O'Connell, Steve Berrios, Carmen Lundy	1979	
8008	Billy Taylor	Live at Storyville	Grady Tate, Victor Gaskin	1977	
8009	Yosuke Yamashita	Breathtake	Solo piano	1975	Frasco FS-7004
8010	Mal Waldron	Left Alone: Mal Waldron Live	Masabumi Kikuchi, Kohsuke Mine, Isao Suzuki, Yoshiyuki Nakamura	1971	Philips FS-6503
8011	Dollar Brand	Memories	Solo piano	1973	Philips RJ-5124
8012	Dave Liebman	First Visit	Richie Beirach, Dave Holland, Jack DeJohnette	1973	Philips RJ-5101
