= After the Morning (1979 John Hicks album) =

Studio album by John Hicks
- Released: 1979
- Recorded: January 5 & 6, 1979 in NYC
- Genre: Jazz
- Label: West 54 WLW 8004

John Hicks chronology
Steadfast (1975)	After the Morning (1979)	Some Other Time (1981)

After the Morning is the debut release by American pianist John Hicks recorded in 1979 and released on the West 54 label. Two earlier sessions led by Hicks were released on Strata-East Records following this album.

== Reception ==
Allmusic awarded the album 4½ stars stating "This first album is a real keeper. Great piano playing throughout."

Professional ratings
Review scores
Source	Rating
Allmusic	4.5/5 stars
The Penguin Guide to Jazz Recordings	3/4 stars

== Track listing ==
All compositions by John Hicks except as indicated

1. "After the Morning"
2. "Serenata" (Leroy Anderson)
3. "Dierdre de Samba"
4. "Some Other Spring" (Arthur Herzog, Jr., Irene Kitchings)
5. "The Duke" (Dave Brubeck)
6. "Impact"
7. "Until the Morning"
8. "Night Journey"

== Personnel ==
- John Hicks - piano
- Walter Booker - bass (tracks 1, 3, 6 & 8)
- Cliff Barbaro - drums (track 6)
