= Clarice McLean =

American dancer

Clarice "Dollie" McLean (born 1936) is founding executive director of the Artists Collective, Inc. of Hartford, Connecticut. McLean, born Clarice Helene Simmons in Antigua, West Indies, was raised in Manhattan, New York. She studied dance under Katherine Dunham, Jon Leone Destine, Asadata Dafora, and Martha Graham. In 1970 she and her husband Jackie McLean (whose vision and concept was the Artists Collective) enlisted local artists bassist Paul (PB) Brown, dancer Cheryl Smith, and visual artist Ionis Martin to join them in establishing the Artists Collective, Inc. in Hartford, Connecticut.

== See also ==
- Artists Collective, Inc.
- Jackie McLean
- Paul H. Brown

== Sources ==
- Connecticut Women's Hall of Fame
- Official history of the Artists Collective Inc.
- History of the Artists Collective Inc.
- Connecticut Historical Society
