= 9 Standards (Quartet) 1993 =

Live album by Anthony Braxton and the Fred Simmons Trio
- Released: 1993
- Recorded: February 25, 1993
- Genre: Jazz
- Length: 117:02
- Label: Leo

Anthony Braxton chronology
Duets (1993) (1993)	9 Standards (Quartet) 1993 (1993)	4 (Ensemble) Compositions 1992 (1993)

9 Standards (Quartet) 1993 is a double CD live album by American saxophonist and composer Anthony Braxton recorded at Wesleyan University in 1993 and released on the English Leo label.

== Reception ==
Professional ratings
Review scores
Source	Rating
AllMusic	4.5/5 stars
The Penguin Guide to Jazz Recordings	3.5/4 stars

The AllMusic review by Chris Kelsey awarded the album 4½ stars stating "Braxton plays this entire live set as if he's got something to prove, and the result is very possibly the most inspired mainstream playing he's ever put on record".

== Track listing ==
Disc One
No.	Title	Writer(s)	Length
1.	"In Motion"	Fred Simmons	14:00
2.	"Cherokee"	Ray Noble	16:21
3.	"You Go to My Head"	John Frederick Coots, Haven Gillespie	14:18
4.	"On Green Dolphin Street"	Bronisław Kaper, Ned Washington	11:40
5.	"All the Things You Are"	Oscar Hammerstein II, Jerome Kern	9:29

Disc Two
No.	Title	Writer(s)	Length
1.	"Mr. P.C."	John Coltrane	13:34
2.	"I Remember You"	Johnny Mercer, Victor Schertzinger	13:05
3.	"What's New?"	Johnny Burke, Bob Haggart	14:25
4.	"Impressions"	Coltrane	10:10

- Recorded at Wesleyan University in Middletown, Connecticut on February 25, 1993

== Personnel ==
- Anthony Braxton – alto saxophone, sopranino saxophone, flute
- Fred Simmons - piano
- Paul Brown - bass
- Leroy Williams - drums
