= Barry Harris Live at "Dug" =

Live at "Dug"

Live album by Barry Harris
- Released: January 21, 1997
- Recorded: May 29, 1995
- Venue: Dug Bar, Tokyo
- Genre: Jazz
- Length: 63:21
- Label: Enja; CRCJ-9131

Barry Harris chronology
Barry Harris in Spain (1991)	Live at "Dug" (1997)	First Time Ever (1996)

Live at "Dug" is a live album by pianist Barry Harris performing jazz standards and some of his own compositions recorded in 1995 on the label Enja Records. His trio also contained bassist Kunimitsu Inaba and drummer Fumio Watanabe.

== Track listing ==
All compositions by Barry Harris except as indicated

1. "Luminescence" - 7:43
2. "Somebody Loves Me" (George Gershwin) - 9:19
3. "No Name Blues" (Earl Bostic) - 5:33
4. "Oblivion" (Bud Powell) - 5:52
5. "It Could Happen to You" (Jimmy Van Heusen) - 5:54
6. "Cherokee" - (Ray Noble) - 5:25
7. "On Green Dolphin Street" (Bronislav Kaper) - 7:08
8. "I Got Rhythm - Rhythm a Ning" (George Gershwin, Thelonious Monk) - 5:35
9. "East of the Sun" (Brooks Bowman) - 6:54
10. "Nascimento" - 4:02

== Personnel ==
- Barry Harris - piano
- Kunimitsu Inaba - bass
- Fumio Watanabe - drums
