= I Didn't Know What Time It Was =

Song by Richard Kollmar
- Released: 1939
- Genre: Pop
- Composer: Richard Rodgers
- Lyricist: Lorenz Hart

"I Didn't Know What Time It Was" is a popular song composed by Richard Rodgers with lyrics by Lorenz Hart for the 1939 musical Too Many Girls. Introduced by Richard Kollmar and Marcy Westcott in the stage musical, early hit versions were recorded by Benny Goodman (vocal by Louise Tobin) and by Jimmy Dorsey (vocal by Bob Eberly).
It was then performed by Trudy Erwin (dubbing for Lucille Ball) and Richard Carlson in the 1940 film adaptation produced by RKO. The song was later interpolated into the score of the 1957 film Pal Joey, sung by Frank Sinatra, and has become a jazz standard. In June 2026, CBS News included the song in its list of the 250 essential American songs of the past 250 years.

== Recordings ==
- Artie Shaw - Shadows / I Didn't Know What Time It Was (1939)
- Charlie Parker – Charlie Parker with Strings (1949)
- Peggy Lee – Black Coffee (1953)
- Louis Jordan (1954)
- Ella Fitzgerald - Ella Fitzgerald Sings the Rodgers and Hart Songbook (1956)
- Stan Getz and Gerry Mulligan – Gerry Mulligan Meets Stan Getz (1957)
- Billie Holiday – Songs for Distingué Lovers (1957)
- Sonny Clark - Sonny Clark Trio (1957)
- Bobby Darin - Love Swings (1958)
- Benny Golson with Curtis Fuller – Groovin' with Golson (1959)
- Barry Harris – Listen to Barry Harris (1961)
- Art Blakey with Wayne Shorter – Ugetsu (1963)
- Timi Yuro - The Amazing Timi Yuro (1964)
- The Crampton Sisters - their 1964 revival for the DCP label was a Hot 100 entry, peaking at #92.
- McCoy Tyner with Bobby Hutcherson – Time for Tyner (1968)
- Ray Charles - #74 in Canada, March 17, 1969
- Betty Carter – Betty Carter at the Village Vanguard (1970)
- David "Fathead" Newman – Captain Buckles (1971)
- Shirley Horn – All of Me (1987)
- Cassandra Wilson – Blue Skies (1988)
- Chick Corea – Expressions (1994)
- Brad Mehldau – The Art of the Trio Vol. 1 (1997)
- Richard Wyands Trio - Lady of the Lavender Mist (1998)
- Cécile McLorin Salvant – WomanChild (2013)
- Sue Raney - Late in Life (2015)
- Barbra Streisand – The Music...The Mem'ries...The Magic! (2017)

Apart from those listed, there are hundreds more versions of the song.

== See also ==
- List of 1930s jazz standards
