= Bull's Eye! =

Album by pianist Barry Harris recorded in 1968 and released on the Prestige label

Studio album by Barry Harris
- Released: 1968
- Recorded: June 4, 1968; New York City
- Genre: Jazz
- Length: 42:27
- Label: Prestige; PR 7600
- Producer: Don Schlitten

Barry Harris chronology
Luminescence! (1967)	Bull's Eye! (1968)	Magnificent! (1969)

Bull's Eye! is an album by pianist Barry Harris recorded in 1968 and released on the Prestige label.

== Reception ==
Professional ratings
Review scores
Source	Rating
Allmusic	4/5 stars
The Rolling Stone Jazz Record Guide	4/5 stars

Allmusic awarded the album 4 stars with its review by Alex Henderson stating, "Harris was always a follower rather than a leader. But again, he's great at what he does, and on Bull's Eye, Harris excels... Die-hard bop enthusiasts can't go wrong with Bull's Eye".

== Track listing ==
All compositions by Barry Harris except where noted.

1. "Bull's Eye" – 7:08
2. "Clockwise" – 4:46
3. "Off Monk" – 9:52
4. "Barengo" – 7:10
5. "Off Minor" (Thelonious Monk) – 4:40
6. "Oh So Basal" – 8:51

== Personnel ==
- Barry Harris – piano
- Kenny Dorham – trumpet (tracks 1, 3, 4 & 6)
- Charles McPherson – tenor saxophone (tracks 1, 3, 4 & 6)
- Pepper Adams – baritone saxophone (tracks 1, 3, 4 & 6)
- Paul Chambers – bass
- Billy Higgins – drums
