= Duets (1993) =

Studio album by Anthony Braxton and Mario Pavone
- Released: 1993
- Recorded: January 4, 1993
- Studio: Cyr Sound, New York
- Genre: Jazz
- Length: 64:06
- Label: Music & Arts

Anthony Braxton chronology
| Wesleyan (12 Altosolos) 1992 (1992) | Duets (1993) (1993) | 9 Standards (Quartet) 1993 (1993) |

Professional ratings
Review scores
| Source | Rating |
|---|---|
| AllMusic | 3/5 stars |
| The Penguin Guide to Jazz Recordings | 4/4 stars |

Duets (1993) is an album by American saxophonist and composer Anthony Braxton with bassist Mario Pavone recorded in 1993 for the Music & Arts label.

== Track listing ==
All compositions by Anthony Braxton except where noted

1. "The Call" Maario Pavone) – 5:58
2. "Composition No. 29" – 5:41
3. "Composition No. 6 (0)" – 5:28
4. "I Remember You" (Victor Schertzinger, Johnny Mercer) – 6:36
5. "Composition No. 87" – 11:48
6. "Double" (Pavone) – 5:26
7. "Composition No. 65" – 5:42
8. "Composition No. 135" – 10:18
9. "Stalemates" (Benny Golson) – 7:09

== Personnel ==
- Anthony Braxton – saxophone, flute
- Mario Pavone – bass
