= Barry Harris at the Jazz Workshop =

Live album by Barry Harris
- Released: 1960
- Recorded: May 15–16, 1960
- Venue: Jazz Workshop (San Francisco)
- Genre: Bebop
- Length: 39:30
- Label: Riverside; RLP 12-326
- Producer: Orrin Keepnews

Barry Harris chronology
Breakin' It Up (1959)	Barry Harris at the Jazz Workshop (1960)	Preminado (1961)

Barry Harris at the Jazz Workshop is a live album by jazz pianist Barry Harris. Recorded in San Francisco in 1960, it was released later that year on the Riverside label.

== Reception ==
Professional ratings
Review scores
Source	Rating
AllMusic	4/5 stars
The Rolling Stone Jazz Record Guide	2/5 stars
The Penguin Guide to Jazz Recordings	3/4 stars

AllMusic awarded the album 4 stars with its review by Scott Yanow stating, "Pianist Barry Harris' second recording as a leader (he led a set for Argo in 1958) finds him at the age of 30 playing in the same boppish style he would have throughout his career".

== Track listing ==
All compositions by Barry Harris except as indicated

1. "Is You Is or Is You Ain't My Baby" (Bill Austin, Louis Jordan) - 5:31
2. "Curtain Call" - 3:45
3. "Star Eyes" (Gene de Paul, Don Raye) - 4:42
4. "Moose the Mooche" (Charlie Parker) - 6:13
5. "Lolita" - 3:59
6. "Morning Coffee" - 4:52
7. "Don't Blame Me" (Jimmy McHugh, Dorothy Fields) - 5:08
8. "Woody 'n' You" (Dizzy Gillespie) - 4:43

== Personnel ==
- Barry Harris - piano
- Sam Jones - bass
- Louis Hayes - drums
