= Preminado =

Studio album by Barry Harris Trio
- Released: 1961
- Recorded: December 21, 1960 and January 19, 1961; New York City
- Genre: Jazz
- Length: 37:31
- Label: Riverside; RLP 354
- Producer: Orrin Keepnews

Barry Harris chronology
Barry Harris at the Jazz Workshop (1960)	Preminado (1961)	Listen to Barry Harris (1961)

Preminado is an album by pianist Barry Harris recorded in late 1960 and early 1961 and released on the Riverside label.

== Reception ==
Professional ratings
Review scores
Source	Rating
AllMusic	4/5 stars
The Rolling Stone Jazz Record Guide	3/5 stars

AllMusic awarded the album 4 stars with its review by Scott Yanow stating, "this fine set has many strong moments".

== Track listing ==
All compositions by Barry Harris except as indicated

1. "My Heart Stood Still" (Richard Rodgers, Lorenz Hart) – 6:33
2. "Preminado" – 5:29
3. "I Should Care" (Axel Stordahl, Paul Weston, Sammy Cahn) – 3:37
4. "There's No One But You" (Austen Croom-Johnson, Redd Evans) – 4:08
5. "One Down" – 4:40
6. "It's the Talk of the Town" (Jerry Livingston, Al J. Neiburg, Marty Symes) – 5:05
7. "Play, Carol, Play" – 4:15
8. "What Is This Thing Called Love?" (Cole Porter) – 4:04

== Personnel ==
- Barry Harris – piano
- Joe Benjamin – bass (tracks 1, 2 & 4–8)
- Elvin Jones – drums (tracks 1, 2 & 4–8)
