= Wesleyan (12 Altosolos) 1992 =

Live album by Anthony Braxton
- Released: 1993
- Recorded: November 14, 1992
- Venue: Wesleyan University, Middletown, CT
- Genre: Jazz
- Length: 71:42
- Label: hatART; CD 6128
- Producer: Anthony Braxton

Anthony Braxton chronology
(Victoriaville) 1992 (1992)	Wesleyan (12 Altosolos) 1992 (1993)	Duets (1993) (1993)

Wesleyan (12 Altosolos) 1992 is a live solo album by composer Anthony Braxton featuring a performance recorded at Wesleyan University which was released on the hatART label.

== Reception ==
Professional ratings
Review scores
Source	Rating
Allmusic	4/5 stars

The Allmusic review by Brian Olewnick stated "Wesleyan (12 Altosolos) 1992 fits quite comfortably into the extraordinary series of recordings of this artist which continued to unearth entirely new and wonderfully creative "language music" for the alto saxophone".

== Track listing ==
All compositions by Anthony Braxton except where noted

1. "No. 170i" – 4:50
2. "No. 106d (+170b)" – 6:06
3. "No. 170a" – 3:23
4. "Charlie's Wig" (Charlie Parker) – 6:54
5. "No. 170c (+77d+99f)" – 6:04
6. "No. 170f (+138c+106g+119d+99d+119f)" – 8:28
7. "I'm Getting Sentimental Over You" (George Bassman, Ned Washington) – 4:59
8. "No. 170g" – 6:59
9. "No. 106j (+106m)" – 4:08
10. "No. 170h" – 5:28
11. "Just Friends" (John Klenner, Sam M. Lewis) – 6:57
12. "No. 118f" – 7:26

== Personnel ==
- Anthony Braxton – alto saxophone
