= Exodus (Slide Hampton album) =

Studio album by Slide Hampton
- Released: 1964
- Recorded: November 14 & 18, 1962; Studio Europa Sonor, Paris, France
- Genre: Jazz
- Length: 45:50
- Label: Philips; B 77 915L
- Producer: Jazz-Promotion

Slide Hampton chronology
Explosion! The Sound of Slide Hampton (1962)	Exodus (1964)	Mellow-dy (1968)

Exodus is an album by American jazz trombonist, composer and arranger Slide Hampton which was recorded in Paris in 1962 and first released on the French Philips label in 1964.

== Reception ==
Professional ratings
Review scores
Source	Rating
Allmusic	4.5/5 stars
The Penguin Guide to Jazz Recordings	3/4 stars

Allmusic stated "Trombonist Slide Hampton, just 30 years old at the time of this octet session in Paris, had already developed into a forward-thinking arranger. ...fans of the trombone will definitely want to acquire this".

== Track listing ==
1. "Exodus" (Ernest Gold) - 3:48
2. "Star Eyes" (Gene de Paul, Don Raye) - 8:45
3. "Confirmation" (Charlie Parker) - 12:21
4. "Moment's Notice" (John Coltrane) - 3:29
5. "I'll Take Romance" (Oscar Hammerstein II, Ben Oakland) - 3:40
6. "I Remember Clifford" (Benny Golson) - 5:10
7. "Straight, No Chaser" (Thelonious Monk) - 8:37

== Personnel ==
- Slide Hampton - trombone, arranger
- Nat Pavone, Richard Williams - trumpet
- Benny Jacobs-El - trombone
- George Coleman - tenor saxophone
- Jay Cameron - baritone saxophone
- Butch Warren - bass
- Vinnie Ruggiero - drums
