= Somethin' Sanctified =

Studio album by Slide Hampton
- Released: 1961
- Recorded: October 17, 1960; NYC
- Genre: Jazz
- Label: Atlantic; LP 1362
- Producer: Artie Shaw

Slide Hampton chronology
| Sister Salvation (1960) | Somethin' Sanctified (1961) | Two Sides of Slide (1961) |

Somethin' Sanctified is an album by American jazz trombonist, composer and arranger Slide Hampton which was released on the Atlantic label in 1961.

== Reception ==
Professional ratings
Review scores
| Source | Rating |
|---|---|
| Allmusic | 3/5 stars |

Allmusic gave the album 3 stars.

== Track listing ==
1. "On the Street Where You Live" (Frederick Loewe, Alan Jay Lerner) - 2:55
2. "The Thrill Is Gone" (Ray Henderson, Lew Brown) - 3:00
3. "Ow" (Dizzy Gillespie) - 2:08
4. "Milestones" (Miles Davis) - 2:33
5. "El Sino" (Charles Greenlea) - 4:37
6. "Somethin' Sanctified" (Slide Hampton) - 2:52

== Personnel ==
- Slide Hampton - trombone, baritone horn, arranger
- Hobart Dotson, Richard Williams - trumpet
- Charles Greenlee - trombone, baritone horn
- Jay Cameron - baritone saxophone, bass clarinet
- George Coleman - tenor saxophone
- Larry Ridley - bass
- Pete La Roca - drums
