= Home (Bill Hardman album) =

Studio album by Bill Hardman
- Released: 1978
- Recorded: January 10, 1978
- Studio: Van Gelder Studio, Englewood Cliffs, NJ
- Genre: Jazz
- Length: 35:21
- Label: Muse; MR 5152
- Producer: Houston Person

Bill Hardman chronology
Saying Something (1961)	Home (1978)	Focus (1980)

Home is an album by American jazz trumpeter Bill Hardman which was recorded in 1978 and released on the Muse label.

== Reception ==
Professional ratings
Review scores
Source	Rating
AllMusic	3/5 stars
DownBeat	4.5/5 stars

The AllMusic review by Scott Yanow stated, "Bill Hardman had long been a talented – if not overly original – bop trumpet soloist. ... Hardman is in excellent form on a pair of Brazilian pieces, two originals by pianist Mickey Tucker and Tadd Dameron's lesser-known 'I Remember Love.' There are also fine solos throughout this date".

== Track listing ==
1. "Samba do Brilho" (Guilherme Vergueiro) − 7:32
2. "Once I Loved" (Antônio Carlos Jobim, Vinícius de Moraes, Ray Gilbert) − 8:50
3. "My Pen Is Hot" (Mickey Tucker) − 5:42
4. "Rancho Cevarro" (Tucker) − 6:42
5. "I Remember Love" (Tadd Dameron) − 6:35

== Personnel ==
- Bill Hardman − trumpet, flugelhorn
- Junior Cook − tenor saxophone
- Slide Hampton − trombone
- Mickey Tucker − piano
- Chin Suzuki − bass
- Victor Jones − drums
- Lawrence Killian − percussion
