= Artists Collective, Inc. =

Cultural institution in the United States

The Artists Collective, Inc. is an interdisciplinary cultural institution in Hartford, Connecticut, that promotes the art and culture of the African diaspora. It was founded in 1970 by alto saxophonist, composer, educator and community activist Jackie McLean, his wife, actress and dancer Dollie McLean, and co-founders bassist Paul Brown, dancer Cheryl Smith, and visual artist Ionis Martin. The Artists Collective provides year-round professional training classes in dance, theater, music, and visual arts to more than 1,000 students annually.

The McLeans' vision was to create a safe haven for at-risk youth as an alternative to the violence of the streets, teen pregnancy, gang and criminal activity.

The Artists Collective has been cited by Harvard University as one of six exemplary community arts centers in the nation and has received numerous awards on the state and national level for its work with youth and their families, including the 2010 National Arts and Humanities Youth Program Award presented by former First Lady, Michelle Obama.

== Notable alumni ==
Famous alumni include: actors Eriq La Salle, Tony Todd and Anika Noni Rose; drummer Cindy Blackman and tenor saxophonist Jimmy Greene, to name a few.

== Website ==
- Artists Collective Inc.
