= The Bird of Red and Gold =

Studio album by Barry Harris
- Released: 1982, 1994
- Recorded: September 18, 1979
- Genre: Jazz
- Label: Xanadu
- Producer: Don Schlitten

Barry Harris chronology
Barry Harris Plays Barry Harris (1978)	The Bird of Red and Gold (1982)	For the Moment (1984)

The Bird of Red and Gold is a solo jazz piano album by Barry Harris, recorded in 1979 and released in 1982.

Five of the twelve compositions were written by Harris. The original 12 tracks were reissued as a CD for a 1994 release, though the CD misprinted the recording as being from a session in 1989.

== Reception ==
Professional ratings
Review scores
Source	Rating
Allmusic	4.5/5 stars

Allmusic awarded the album 4½ stars with its review by Scott Yanow calling it, "Superior bop-based music".

== Track listing ==
1. "Nascimento" (Barry Harris) – 3:49
2. "Body and Soul" (Edward Heyma, Robert Sour, Frank Eyton, Johnny Green) – 5:40
3. "Sweet and Lovely" (Gus Arnheim, Charles N. Daniels, Harry Tobias) – 4:37
4. "Tommy's Ballad" (Harris) – 6:10
5. "Nobody's" (Harris) – 3:52
6. "Cats In My Belfry" (Harris) – 4:35
7. "This Is No Laughing Matter" (Buddy Kaye, Al Frisch) – 5:57
8. "Tea for Two" (Irving Caesar, Vincent Youmans) – 5:15
9. "My Ideal" (Newell Chase, Richard Whiting, Leo Robin) – 4:12
10. "Just One of Those Things" (Cole Porter) – 3:04
11. "Pannonica" (Thelonious Monk) – 6:37
12. "The Bird of Red and Gold" (Harris) – 2:27

== Personnel ==
Recorded on September 18, 1979.

- Barry Harris – piano, vocals
