= 4 (Ensemble) Compositions 1992 =

Studio album by Anthony Braxton with the Northwest Creative Orchestra
- Released: 1993
- Recorded: December 5, 1992, and March 16, 1993
- Studio: Sear Sound, New York City
- Genre: Jazz
- Length: 73:18
- Label: Black Saint
- Producer: Flavio Bonandrini

Anthony Braxton chronology
9 Standards (Quartet) 1993 (1993)	4 (Ensemble) Compositions 1992 (1993)	Trio (London) 1993 (1993)

4 (Ensemble) Compositions (1992) is an album by American saxophonist and composer Anthony Braxton recorded in 1993 for the Italian Black Saint label.

== Reception ==
The Allmusic review by Brian Olewnick awarded the album 4 stars stating "Listeners who might be cautious about the more arcane aspects of his work will find a relatively accessible introduction to Braxton's "classical" leanings herein as will others interested in the state of contemporary, creative orchestral writing. A rewarding, challenging effort".

Professional ratings
Review scores
Source	Rating
Allmusic	4/5 stars

== Track listing ==
All compositions by Anthony Braxton.

1. "Composition 100" – 15:41
2. "Composition 96" – 10:16
3. "Composition 164" – 23:09
4. "Composition 163" – 24:09

== Personnel ==
- Anthony Braxton – conductor
- Robert Rumboltz – trumpet
- Roland Dahinden, John Rapson – trombone
- Don Byron – clarinet, bass clarinet
- Marty Ehrlich – flute, clarinet, alto saxophone, tenor saxophone, piccolo
- J. D. Parran – flute, bamboo flute, clarinet, alto clarinet, bass clarinet
- Randy McKean – clarinet, bass clarinet, alto saxophone
- Ted Reichman – accordion
- Guy Klucevsek– accordion, bodysounds
- Amina Claudine Myers – organ
- Jay Hoggard – vibraphone, marimba
- Warren Smith – percussion
- Lynden Achee – steel drums
- Anne LeBaron – harp

Mastered at PhonoComp in Tribiano, Italy.
