= Vicissitudes =

Studio album by Barry Harris
- Released: 1975
- Recorded: 1972; New York City
- Genre: Jazz
- Labels: MPS; MPS 15386
- Producer: Don Schlitten

Barry Harris chronology
Magnificent! (1969)	Vicissitudes (1975)	Barry Harris Plays Tadd Dameron (1975)

Vicissitudes is an album by pianist Barry Harris recorded in 1972 and released on the German MPS label.

== Track listing ==
All compositions by Barry Harris except as indicated

1. "Vicissitudes" - 4:15
2. "Now and Then" - 5:07
3. "Sweet Sewanee Blues" - 5:10
4. "Donna Lee" (Charlie Parker) - 5:50
5. "Renaissance" - 3:48
6. "And So I Love You" - 4:11
7. "With a Grain of Salt" - 3:19
8. "If I Loved You" (Oscar Hammerstein II, Richard Rodgers) - 4:47
9. "Shaw 'Nuff" (Dizzy Gillespie, Parker) - 3:05

== Personnel ==
- Barry Harris - piano
- George Duvivier - bass
- Leroy Williams - drums
