= What's Up (Bill Hardman album) =

Studio album by Bill Hardman Sextet
- Released: 1989
- Recorded: July 7, 1989
- Studio: Copenhagen, Denmark
- Genre: Jazz
- Length: 67:34 CD release with additional tracks
- Label: SteepleChase; SCS 1254
- Producer: Nils Winther

Bill Hardman chronology
Politely (1981)	What's Up (1989)

What's Up is the final album by American jazz trumpeter Bill Hardman which was recorded in Copenhagen in 1989 and released on the Danish SteepleChase label.

Professional ratings
Review scores
Source	Rating
AllMusic	4/5 stars
The Penguin Guide to Jazz Recordings	3/4 stars

== Track listing ==
1. "Fuller Up" (Mickey Tucker) − 5:23
2. "I Should Care" (Axel Stordahl, Paul Weston, Sammy Cahn) − 9:20
3. "Whisper Not" (Benny Golson) − 8:17
4. "Straight Ahead" (Kenny Dorham) − 10:28 Additional track on CD release
5. "P.B." (Bill Hardman) − 7:08
6. "Like Someone in Love" (Jimmy Van Heusen, Johnny Burke) − 8:54
7. "Yo What's Up" (Tucker) − 7:40
8. "Room's Blues" (Tucker) − 10:04 Additional track on CD release

== Personnel ==
- Bill Hardman − trumpet
- Junior Cook − tenor saxophone
- Robin Eubanks − trombone
- Mickey Tucker − piano
- Paul Brown − bass
- Leroy Williams − drums
