= World of Trombones =

1979 studio album by Slide Hampton

Studio album by Slide Hampton
- Released: 1979
- Recorded: January 8 & 9, 1979; Celebration Recording Inc., New York City
- Genre: Jazz
- Length: 36:58
- Label: West 54 WLW 8001
- Producer: Roger Pola

Slide Hampton chronology
Give Me a Double (1974)	World of Trombones (1979)	Art Farmer & Slide Hampton in Concert (1984)

World of Trombones is an album by American trombonist, composer and arranger Slide Hampton, recorded in 1979 and first released on the West 54 label.

== Reception ==
Professional ratings
Review scores
Source	Rating
AllMusic	4/5 stars
DownBeat	4/5 stars

AllMusic reviewer Ron Wynn described the album as an "ambitious project with nine trombonists merging their skills under the leadership of Slide Hampton" and stated: "Hampton's arrangements are excellent, but there's more emphasis on performance style than real solo development."

== Track listing ==
1. "Chorale" (Slide Hampton) - 1:22
2. "Lester Leaps In" (Lester Young) - 4:27
3. "'Round Midnight" (Thelonious Monk, Cootie Williams, Bernie Hanighen) - 4:35
4. "Donna Lee" (Charlie Parker) - 7:17
5. "Con Alma" (Dizzy Gillespie) - 7:48
6. "Lament" (J. J. Johnson) - 5:30
7. "Impressions" (John Coltrane) - 5:59

== Personnel ==
- Slide Hampton - trombone, arranger, conductor
- Clifford Adams, Jr., Clarence Banks, Curtis Fuller, Janice Robinson, Tyrone Jefferson, Steve Turre, Angel 'Papo' Vasquez - trombone
- Earl McIntyre, Douglas Purviance - bass trombone
- Albert Dailey - piano
- Ray Drummond - bass
- Leroy Williams - drums
