= Drum Suite (Slide Hampton album) =

Studio album by Slide Hampton
- Released: 1964
- Recorded: April 5, 9 & 18, 1962
- Studio: Columbia 7th Ave, New York City
- Genre: Jazz
- Length: 51:30 Reissue with bonus tracks
- Label: Epic; LA 16030
- Producer: Teo Macero

Slide Hampton chronology
Jazz with a Twist (1962)	Drum Suite (1964)	Explosion! The Sound of Slide Hampton (1962)

Drum Suite is an album by American jazz trombonist, composer and arranger Slide Hampton which was recorded in 1962 and first released on the Epic label.

== Reception ==
Professional ratings
Review scores
Source	Rating
Allmusic	4/5 stars

Allmusic stated "Overall the music is rewarding and if not quite essential, there are enough exciting moments (whether from the ensembles or the main soloists) to make this a recommended acquisition".

== Track listing ==
All compositions by Slide Hampton except as indicated

1. "Fump" - 5:21
2. "Lover" (Richard Rodgers, Lorenz Hart) - 5:09
3. "Like Someone in Love" (Jimmy Van Heusen, Johnny Burke) - 8:26
4. "Gallery Groove" - 4:27
5. "Our Waltz" (David Rose) - 5:23
6. "It's All Right with Me" (Cole Porter) - 3:35
7. "Stella by Starlight" (Victor Young, Ned Washington) - 3:14
8. "The Drum Suite" - 6:55
9. "Well, You Needn't" (Thelonious Monk) - 5:46 Bonus track on CD reissue
10. "Sleigh Ride" (Leroy Anderson, Mitchell Parish) - 3:14 Bonus track on CD reissue

== Personnel ==
- Slide Hampton - trombone, arranger
- John Bello (tracks 2 & 7–10), Hobart Dotson, Freddie Hubbard (tracks: 5–7), Willie Thomas (tracks 1, 3, 4 & 8), Richard Williams - trumpet
- Benny Jacobs-El - trombone
- George Coleman - tenor saxophone
- Yusef Lateef - flute, tenor saxophone (tracks 1, 3, 4 & 8)
- Jay Cameron - baritone saxophone
- Tommy Flanagan - piano
- Eddie Khan - bass
- Max Roach (tracks 1–8), Vinnie Ruggiero (tracks 7, 9 & 10) - drums
