= Sister Salvation =

Studio album by Slide Hampton Octet
- Released: 1960
- Recorded: February 11 & 15, 1960
- Studio: Bell Sound (New York City)
- Genre: Jazz
- Length: 35:52
- Label: Atlantic; LP 1339
- Producer: Artie Shaw

Slide Hampton chronology
Slide Hampton and His Horn of Plenty (1959)	Sister Salvation (1960)	Somethin' Sanctified (1961)

Sister Salvation is an album by American jazz trombonist, composer and arranger Slide Hampton which was released on the Atlantic label in 1960.

== Reception ==
Professional ratings
Review scores
Source	Rating
Allmusic	3.5/5 stars
The Penguin Guide to Jazz Recordings	3/4 stars

Allmusic gave the album 3½ stars.

== Track listing ==
All compositions by Slide Hampton except as indicated

1. "Sister Salvation" - 6:13
2. "Just Squeeze Me" (Duke Ellington, Lee Gaines) - 6:30
3. "Hi-Fli" (Randy Weston) - 6:06
4. "Assevervation" - 5:55
5. "Conversation Piece" (a.k.a. "Minority") (Gigi Gryce) - 6:53
6. "A Little Night Music" - 4:09

== Personnel ==
- Slide Hampton - trombone, arranger
- Freddie Hubbard, Ernie Royal (tracks 2 & 4–6), Richard Williams (tracks 1 & 3), Bob Zottola - trumpet
- Bernard McKinney - euphonium
- Bill Barber - tuba
- George Coleman - tenor saxophone, arranger
- Jay Cameron - baritone saxophone
- Nabil Totah - bass
- Pete La Roca - drums
- Bill Frazier - arranger
