= Politely (album) =

Studio album by Bill Hardman
- Released: 1982
- Recorded: July 7, 1981
- Studio: Van Gelder Studio, Englewood Cliffs, NJ
- Genre: Jazz
- Length: 36:36
- Label: Muse; MR 5184
- Producer: Bob Porter

Bill Hardman chronology
Focus (1980)	Politely (1982)	What's Up (1989)

Politely is an album by American jazz trumpeter Bill Hardman which was recorded in 1981 and released on the Muse label the following year.

== Reception ==
Professional ratings
Review scores
Source	Rating
AllMusic	4.5/5 stars

The AllMusic review by Scott Yanow stated, "This quintet date is very much in the bop vein. Despite its title, much of the session is actually hard driving".

== Track listing ==
1. "Love Letters" (Victor Young, Edward Heyman) − 6:00
2. "Politely" (Bill Hardman) − 6:14
3. "Lazybird" (John Coltrane) − 6:15
4. "Coral Keys" (Walter Bishop Jr.) − 9:47
5. "Smooch" (Charles Mingus, Miles Davis) − 8:20

== Personnel ==
- Bill Hardman − trumpet
- Junior Cook − tenor saxophone
- Walter Bishop Jr. − piano
- Paul Brown − bass
- Leroy Williams − drums
