= Luminescence! =

Studio album by The Barry Harris Sextet
- Released: 1967
- Recorded: April 20, 1967; New York City
- Genre: Jazz
- Length: 38:27
- Label: Prestige; PR 7498
- Producer: Don Schlitten

Barry Harris chronology
Chasin' the Bird (1962)	Luminescence! (1967)	Bull's Eye! (1968)

Luminescence! is an album by pianist Barry Harris recorded in 1967 and released on the Prestige label.

== Reception ==
Professional ratings
Review scores
Source	Rating
Allmusic	4/5 stars
The Rolling Stone Jazz Record Guide	3/5 stars
The Penguin Guide to Jazz Recordings	3.5/4 stars

Allmusic awarded the album 4 stars with its review by Scott Yanow stating, "Everyone is in fine form, particularly Harris and Adams, and the pianist's arrangements perfectly fit (and uplift) the music. Highly recommended to bebop collectors".

== Track listing ==
All compositions by Barry Harris except as indicated

1. "Luminescence" - 6:23
2. "Like This!" - 2:58
3. "Nicaragua" - 8:36
4. "Dance of the Infidels" (Bud Powell) - 5:05
5. "Webb City" (Powell) - 5:58
6. "My Ideal" (Newell Chase, Leo Robin, Richard A. Whiting) - 2:47
7. "Even Steven" - 6:40

== Personnel ==
- Barry Harris - piano
- Slide Hampton - trombone
- Junior Cook - tenor saxophone
- Pepper Adams - baritone saxophone
- Bob Cranshaw - bass
- Lenny McBrowne - drums
