= Slide Hampton and His Horn of Plenty =

Studio album by Slide Hampton
- Released: 1959
- Recorded: 1959
- Studio: Bell Sound (New York City)
- Genre: Jazz
- Length: 37:43
- Label: Strand; SL/SLS-1006

Slide Hampton chronology
Slide Hampton and His Horn of Plenty (1959)	Sister Salvation (1960)

Slide Hampton and His Horn of Plenty (titled Slide! on the back cover) is the debut album by American jazz trombonist, composer and arranger Slide Hampton which was released on the Strand label in 1961.

== Reception ==
Professional ratings
Review scores
Source	Rating
Allmusic	4.5/5 stars

Allmusic stated: "The hard bop music is ably interpreted by the medium-size group, which was overflowing with young talent".

== Track listing ==
All compositions by Slide Hampton, except as indicated.

1. "Newport" - 9:10
2. "Autumn Leaves" (Joseph Kosma, Jacques Prevert, Johnny Mercer) - 3:24
3. "Althea" - 4:01
4. "Jazz Corner" - 4:22
5. "Sometimes I Feel Like a Motherless Child" (Traditional) - 3:00
6. "Go East, Young Man" - 5:54
7. "Patricia" - 3:42
8. "Woody 'n' You" (Dizzy Gillespie) - 4:10

== Personnel ==
- Slide Hampton - trombone, arranger
- Burt Collins, Freddie Hubbard, Booker Little - trumpet
- Kiane Zawadi - euphonium
- George Coleman - tenor saxophone
- Jay Cameron - baritone saxophone
- George Tucker - bass
- Kenny Dennis (tracks 3 & 8), Pete La Roca (tracks 1 & 4–6), Charli Persip (tracks 2 & 7) - drums
