= Barry Harris Plays Tadd Dameron =

Studio album by Barry Harris
- Released: 1975
- Recorded: June 4, 1975
- Studio: RCA Studios, New York
- Genre: Jazz
- Length: 41:53
- Label: Xanadu; 113
- Producer: Don Schlitten

Barry Harris chronology
Vicissitudes (1972)	Barry Harris Plays Tadd Dameron (1975)	Live in Tokyo (1976)

Barry Harris Plays Tadd Dameron is an album by pianist Barry Harris featuring compositions associated with Tadd Dameron. It was recorded in 1975 and released on the Xanadu label.

== Reception ==
Professional ratings
Review scores
Source	Rating
Allmusic	4.5/5 stars
The Rolling Stone Jazz Record Guide	2/5 stars

Allmusic reviewer Scott Yanow stated: "The perfect player to interpret Tadd Dameron's music (of which he had full understanding), Harris performs eight of the influential composer's songs on this 1975 album".

== Track listing ==
All compositions by Tadd Dameron, except where indicated.

1. "Hot House" - 4:29
2. "Soultrane" - 5:38
3. "The Chase" - 4:58
4. "Lady Bird" - 5:03
5. "Casbah" - 8:27
6. "If You Could See Me Now" (Tadd Dameron, Carl Sigman) - 5:28
7. "The Tadd Walk" - 3:35
8. "Our Delight" - 4:15

== Personnel ==
- Barry Harris - piano
- Gene Taylor - bass
- Leroy Williams - drums
