= Magnificent! =

Studio album by Barry Harris
- Released: 1970
- Recorded: November 25, 1969; New York
- Genre: Jazz
- Length: 39:13
- Label: Prestige; PR 7733
- Producer: Don Schlitten

Barry Harris chronology
Bull's Eye! (1968)	Magnificent! (1970)	Vicissitudes (1972)

Magnificent! is an album by pianist Barry Harris recorded in 1969 and released on the Prestige label.

== Reception ==
Professional ratings
Review scores
Source	Rating
Allmusic	4/5 stars
The Rolling Stone Jazz Record Guide	3/5 stars
The Penguin Guide to Jazz Recordings	4/4 stars

Allmusic awarded the album 4 stars with its review by Jim Todd stating, "Magnificent brilliantly illustrates Barry Harris' unique rapport with the bop piano tradition. Absolutely unlike the enervating, curatorial approach of the neo-con movement, Harris deals with the tradition as a continuum, perpetually rejuvenating and extending it". Awarding the album a maximum four-star rating, The Penguin Guide to Jazz identified it as part of their recommended "core collection".

== Track listing ==
All compositions by Barry Harris except as indicated

1. "Bean and the Boys" (Coleman Hawkins) - 6:41
2. "You Sweet and Fancy Lady" - 4:04
3. "Rouge" - 4:15
4. "Ah-Leu-Cha" (Charlie Parker) - 4:00
5. "Just Open Your Heart" - 6:05
6. "Sun Dance" - 4:21
7. "These Foolish Things" (Harry Link, Holt Marvell, Jack Strachey) - 5:20
8. "Dexterity" (Parker) - 4:27

== Personnel ==
- Barry Harris - piano
- Ron Carter - bass
- Leroy Williams - drums
