= Lullaby of Birdland (album) =

Live album by Lee Konitz featuring Barry Harris
- Released: 1994
- Recorded: September 6–7, 1991
- Venue: Birdland, NYC
- Genre: Jazz
- Length: 63:01
- Label: Candid; CCD 79540
- Producer: Mark Morganelli

Lee Konitz chronology
Marian McPartland's Piano Jazz with Guest Lee Konitz (1991)	Lullaby of Birdland (1994)	Friends (1991)

Lullaby of Birdland is a live album by saxophonist Lee Konitz featuring pianist Barry Harris which was recorded at Birdland in 1991 and released on the Candid label.

== Critical reception ==
Professional ratings
Review scores
Source	Rating
Allmusic	4/5 stars
The Penguin Guide to Jazz Recordings	3.5/4 stars

The Allmusic review stated "Konitz and Harris have not crossed paths all that often through the years but they joined forces for an engagement at Birdland in 1991. ... The two stylists mix together just fine. Konitz's sweet/sour tone and melancholy moods are joyfully uplifted by Harris' mastery of bebop".

== Track listing ==
1. "Lullaby of Birdland" (George Shearing) – 9:05
2. "This Is Always" (Harry Warren, Mack Gordon) – 7:44
3. "Anthropology" (Dizzy Gillespie, Charlie Parker) – 7:53
4. "Ask Me Now" (Thelonious Monk) – 9:54
5. "East of the Sun" (Brooks Bowman) – 6:23
6. "Cherokee" (Ray Noble) – 7:28
7. "'Round Midnight" (Monk) – 8:38
8. "The Song Is You" (Jerome Kern, Oscar Hammerstein II) – 5:56

== Personnel ==
- Lee Konitz – alto saxophone
- Barry Harris – piano
- Calvin Hill – bass
- Leroy Williams – drums
