= Barry Harris Plays Barry Harris =

Studio album by Barry Harris
- Released: 1978
- Recorded: January 17, 1978
- Studio: RCA Studios, New York
- Genre: Jazz
- Label: Xanadu; 154
- Producer: Don Schlitten

Barry Harris chronology
Live in Tokyo (1976)	Barry Harris Plays Barry Harris (1978)	The Bird of Red and Gold (1982)

Barry Harris Plays Barry Harris is an album by pianist Barry Harris performing his own compositions which was recorded in 1978 and released on the Xanadu label.

== Reception ==
Professional ratings
Review scores
Source	Rating
Allmusic	4/5 stars
The Rolling Stone Jazz Record Guide	3/5 stars

Allmusic awarded the album 4 stars with its review by Scott Yanow stating, "For this excellent Xanadu set (an LP that was reissued briefly on CD), pianist Barry Harris (not particularly famous as a composer) performs seven of his catchy originals, most of which are based on the chord changes of bop standards".

== Track listing ==
All compositions by Barry Harris

1. Chances Go Around" - 4:41
2. "Backyard" - 7:29
3. "Luminescence" - 3:35
4. "Even Tempered" - 5:24
5. "Inca" - 5:22
6. "Father Flanagan" - 9:03
7. "Apache" - 5:13

== Personnel ==
- Barry Harris - piano
- George Duvivier - bass
- Leroy Williams - drums
