= Live in Tokyo (Barry Harris album) =

Live album by Barry Harris
- Released: 1976
- Recorded: April 12 & 14, 1976
- Venue: Sun Plaza Hall, Tokyo, Japan
- Genre: Jazz
- Label: Xanadu; 130
- Producer: Don Schlitten

Barry Harris chronology
Barry Harris Plays Tadd Dameron (1975)	Live in Tokyo (1976)	Barry Harris Plays Barry Harris (1978)

Live in Tokyo is a live album by pianist Barry Harris which was recorded in Japan in 1976 and released on the Xanadu label.

== Reception ==
Professional ratings
Review scores
Source	Rating
Allmusic	4.5/5 stars
The Rolling Stone Jazz Record Guide	3/5 stars

The Allmusic review awarded the album 4½ stars stating "Although not containing any real surprises, this swinging, straight-ahead music is quite enjoyable".

== Track listing ==
All compositions by Barry Harris except as indicated

1. "A Soft Spot" - 5:46
2. "Round Midnight" (Thelonious Monk) - 5:58
3. "Tea for Two" (Vincent Youmans, Irving Caesar) - 4:45
4. "Dance of the Infidels" (Bud Powell) - 5:43
5. "I'll Remember April" (Gene de Paul, Patricia Johnston, Don Raye) - 8:39
6. Dedication in Japanese - 1:15
7. "Fukai Aijoh" - 4:09
8. "Un Poco Loco" (Powell) - 6:14

== Personnel ==
- Barry Harris - piano
- Sam Jones - bass
- Leroy Williams - drums
