= Steadfast (John Hicks album) =

Studio album by John Hicks
- Released: September 19, 1991
- Recorded: May 21, 1975, London, England
- Genre: Jazz
- Label: Strata-East SECD 9008; Bellaphon 660-51-010

John Hicks chronology
Hells Bells (1975)	Steadfast (1991)	After the Morning (1979)

Steadfast is one of two albums recorded by American jazz pianist John Hicks during his first studio session as leader in 1975. It was ultimately released on the Strata-East and Bellaphon Records labels in 1991.

Hicks's material covers "decades-old standards, time-tested jazz works and his own [...] originals". Critic Ken Dryden wrote that Hicks was "at the top of his game, with an excellent instrument and engineer in a London studio".

== Track listing ==
No.	Title	Writer(s)	Length
1.	"One For John Mixon"	John Hicks	4:15
2.	"Lush Life"	Billy Strayhorn	3:28
3.	"Pensativa"	Clare Fischer	3:32
4.	"Sophisticated Lady"	Duke Ellington, Irving Mills, Mitchell Parish	2:47
5.	"Hamp's Dance"	John Hicks	2:48
6.	"My One and Only Love"	Robert Mellin, Guy Wood	2:30
7.	"Steadfast"	John Hicks	5:33
8.	"Serenade"	J. Walters	2:08
9.	"Without a Song"	Vincent Youmans	3:54
10.	"In a Sentimental Mood"	Duke Ellington, Manny Kurtz	2:12
11.	"Soul Eyes"	Mal Waldron	1:59
12.	"A Nightingale Sang in Berkeley Square"	Eric Maschwitz, Manning Sherwin	2:57
13.	"The Bright Eyes"	John Hicks	4:27

== Personnel ==
- Design – Ulrich Hofmann
- Digital mastering – Malcolm Addey
- Photography – Manfred Rinderspacher
- Piano – John Hicks
- Digital transfer – Duncan Stanbury
