= Breakin' It Up =

Studio album by Barry Harris Trio
- Released: 1959
- Recorded: July 31, 1958; Chicago
- Genre: Jazz
- Length: 32:28
- Label: Argo; LP 644
- Producer: Dave Usher

Barry Harris chronology
Breakin' It Up (1959)	Barry Harris at the Jazz Workshop (1960)

Breakin' It Up is the debut album by pianist Barry Harris recorded in 1958 and released on the Argo label.

== Reception ==
Professional ratings
Review scores
Source	Rating
Allmusic	4/5 stars
The Penguin Guide to Jazz Recordings	3/4 stars

Allmusic awarded the album 4 stars with its review by Jason Ankeney stating: "Barry Harris' debut Argo session captures a uniquely soulful interpretation of bop sensibilities. Light yet commanding, Breakin' It Up moves from strength to strength, belying the pianist's relative youth and inexperience".

== Track listing ==
All compositions by Barry Harris except as indicated

1. "All the Things You Are" (Oscar Hammerstein II, Jerome Kern) - 5:02
2. "Ornithology" (Charlie Parker) - 3:27
3. "Bluesy" - 4:31
4. "Passport" (Parker) - 3:42
5. "Allen's Alley"- 7:21 (Denzil Best)
6. "Embraceable You" (George Gershwin, Ira Gershwin) - 2:55
7. "SRO" - 5:50
8. "Stranger in Paradise" (Robert Wright, George Forrest) - 4:42

== Personnel ==
- Barry Harris - piano
- William Austin - bass
- Frank Gant - drums
