= Chasin' the Bird (Barry Harris album) =

Studio album by Barry Harris
- Released: 1962
- Recorded: May 31 and August 23, 1962
- Studio: Plaza Sound Studios, New York City
- Genre: Jazz
- Length: 39:20
- Label: Riverside; RLP 435
- Producer: Orrin Keepnews

Barry Harris chronology
Newer Than New (1961)	Chasin' the Bird (1962)	Luminescence! (1967)

Chasin' the Bird is an album by pianist Barry Harris recorded in 1962 and released on the Riverside label.

== Reception ==
Professional ratings
Review scores
Source	Rating
AllMusic	4/5 stars
The Penguin Guide to Jazz Recordings	3.5/4 stars

AllMusic awarded the album 4 stars with its review by Scott Yanow stating, "This is excellent music that should please bop collectors."

== Track listing ==
All compositions by Barry Harris except as indicated

1. "Chasin' the Bird" (Charlie Parker) – 5:32
2. "The Breeze and I" (Ernesto Lecuona, Al Stillman) – 4:14
3. "Around the Corner" – 3:01
4. "Just as Though You Were Here" (John Benson Brooks, Eddie DeLange) – 3:38
5. "(Back Home Again in) Indiana" (James F. Hanley, Ballard MacDonald) – 2:54
6. "Stay Right with It" – 5:12
7. "'Round Midnight" (Thelonious Monk) – 5:22
8. "Bish Bash Bosh" – 4:32
9. "The Way You Look Tonight" (Dorothy Fields, Jerome Kern) – 4:55

== Personnel ==
- Barry Harris – piano
- Bob Cranshaw – bass
- Clifford Jarvis – drums
