= Expressions (Chick Corea album) =

Studio album by Chick Corea
- Released: May 1994
- Genre: Jazz
- Length: 63:24
- Label: GRP
- Producer: Dave Grusin, Larry Rosen, Chick Corea

Chick Corea chronology
Paint the World (1993)	Expressions (1994)	Live in Montreux (1994)

Professional ratings
Review scores
Source	Rating
Allmusic	2.5/5 stars
The Penguin Guide to Jazz Recordings	3.5/4 stars

Expressions is an album by Chick Corea, released in 1994 through the record label GRP. The album peaked at number ten on Billboard's Top Jazz Albums chart.

The Album is dedicated to Art Tatum.

== Track listing ==
1. "Lush Life" (Billy Strayhorn) – 6:29
2. "This Nearly Was Mine" (Oscar Hammerstein II, Richard Rodgers) – 3:32
3. "It Could Happen To You" (Johnny Burke, James Van Heusen) – 3:35
4. "My Ship" (Ira Gershwin, Kurt Weill) – 3:18
5. "I Didn't Know What Time It Was" (Lorenz Hart, Richard Rodgers) – 4:05
6. "Monk's Mood" (Thelonious Monk) – 5:33
7. "Oblivion" (Bud Powell) – 3:46
8. "Pannonica" (Thelonious Monk) – 6:05
9. "Someone to Watch Over Me" (George Gershwin, Ira Gershwin) – 5:59
10. "Armando's Rhumba" (Chick Corea) – 4:18
11. "Blues for Art" (Chick Corea) – 4:48
12. "Stella By Starlight" (Ned Washington, Victor Young) – 4:34
13. "I Want to Be Happy" (Irving Caesar, Vincent Youmans) – 4:50
14. "Smile" (Charlie Chaplin, Geoff Parsons, John Turner) – 2:32

UK version added "Anna" written by A. J. Corea on the original album.

== Personnel ==
Musician

- Chick Corea – piano

Production

- Tom Banghart – mixing
- Bernie Kirsh – engineering, mixing

== Chart performance ==
Year	Chart	Position
1994	Billboard Jazz Albums	10
