= Jay Cameron =

American jazz musician (1928–2001)

- Born: September 14, 1928; New York City, New York, U.S.
- Died: March 20, 2001 (aged 72) San Diego, California, U.S.
- Genres: Jazz
- Instruments: baritone saxophone, Bass clarinet, clarinet, flute

Jay Cameron (September 14, 1928 – March 20, 2001) was an American jazz reed musician who played the baritone saxophone, bass clarinet, flute, and B-flat clarinet.

== Career ==
Cameron began as an alto saxophonist but later recorded with bass clarinet, baritone saxophone, and B-flat clarinet. His career began in the early 1940s in Hollywood with Isaac M. Carpenter's band, with whom he played until 1947. He became best known for his work on baritone saxophone, which was his primary instrument for over 50 years.

Cameron moved to Europe near the end of the decade and played with Rex Stewart, Bill Coleman, Roy Haynes and Henri Renaud in France and Italy; in the early 1950s Cameron gigged around Belgium, Germany, and Scandinavia. In 1955 he played steadily in Paris with a band that included Bobby Jaspar, Barney Wilen and Jean-Louis Chautemps. He returned to the United States in 1956, playing in the bands of Woody Herman (1956) and Slide Hampton (1960). He also worked with Chet Baker, Dizzy Gillespie, Maynard Ferguson (1957–58), Freddie Hubbard (1958), Candido Camero, Bill Barron, André Hodeir, Hal McKusick, and Les and Larry Elgart. He led the International Sax Band and the Third Herdsmen. In the late-1960s, Cameron toured with Paul Winter.

== Personal life ==
Cameron was born in New York City and died in San Diego.

== Discography ==
=== As leader ===
- Jay Cameron's International Sax-Band (Swing, 1955)

=== As sideman ===
With Slide Hampton

- Slide Hampton and His Horn of Plenty (Strand, 1961)
- Sister Salvation (Atlantic, 1960)
- Somethin' Sanctified (Atlantic, 1961)
- Two Sides of Slide (Charlie Parker, 1961)
- Jazz with a Twist (Atlantic, 1962)
- Drum Suite (Epic, 1962)
- Exodus (Philips, 1962)
- Explosion! The Sound of Slide Hampton (Atlantic, 1962)

With others

- Bill Barron, Modern Windows (Savoy, 1962)
- Cándido Camero, Conga Soul (Roulette, 1962)
- Maynard Ferguson, A Message from Newport (Roulette, 1960)
- Dodo Greene, Ain't What You Do (Time, 1959)
- Roy Haynes, Roy Haynes Modern Group (Swing, 1955)
- Woody Herman, Blues Groove (Capitol, 1956)
- Andre Hodeir, American Jazzmen Play Andre Hodeir's Essais (Savoy, 1957)
- Hal McKusick, Cross Section-Saxes (Decca, 1958)
- Hal McKusick, Now's the Time (Decca, 1995)
- Anthony Ortega, Jazz for Young Moderns (and Old Buzzards, Too) (Bethlehem, 1959)
- Anthony Ortega, Earth Dance (Fresh Sound, 2001)
- Herb Pomeroy & Maynard Ferguson, Trumpets Out Front (Vogue, 1971)
- Paul Winter, New Jazz On Campus (Columbia, 1963)
- Paul Winter, Jazz Meets the Folk Song (Columbia, 1964)
- Paul Winter/Bola Sete & Vince Guaraldi, Ralph J. Gleason's Jazz Casual (Koch, 2001)
