= Hells Bells (album) =

Studio album by John Hicks
- Released: 1980
- Recorded: May 21, 1975 in London, England
- Genre: Jazz
- Length: 38:50
- Label: Strata-East SES 8002

John Hicks chronology
Hells Bells (1980)	Steadfast (1975)

Hells Bells is a studio album led by American pianist John Hicks recorded in 1975 but not released on the Strata-East label until 1980. It is one of two albums to be recorded during Hicks' debut studio session as leader, the other being Steadfast, ultimately released in 1991. Hells Bells was reissued on CD by Charly Records in 1998.

== Reception ==
Allmusic awarded the album 3 stars.

Professional ratings
Review scores
Source	Rating
Allmusic	3/5 stars

== Track listing ==
All compositions by John Hicks except as indicated

1. "Hell's Bells" (Cliff Barbaro) - 9:50
2. "Avojca" - 8:17
3. "Yemenja" - 10:53
4. "Angie's Tune" - 9:50

== Personnel ==
- John Hicks - piano
- Clint Houston - bass
- Cliff Barbaro - drums
