= Jazz with a Twist =

Studio album by Slide Hampton
- Released: 1962
- Recorded: November 9 and December 11, 1961; NYC
- Genre: Jazz
- Label: Atlantic; LP 1379
- Producer: Nesuhi Ertegun

Slide Hampton chronology
Two Sides of Slide (1961)	Jazz with a Twist (1962)	Drum Suite (1962)

Jazz with a Twist is an album by American jazz trombonist, composer and arranger Slide Hampton which was released on the Atlantic label in 1962.

== Reception ==
Professional ratings
Review scores
Source	Rating
Allmusic	3/5 stars

Allmusic gave the album 3 stars.

== Track listing ==
All compositions by Slide Hampton, except as indicated.

1. "The Jazz Twist" - 2:33
2. "Mack the Knife" (Kurt Weill, Bertolt Brecht) - 3:00
3. "Gorgeous George" - 2:08
4. "Strollin'" (Horace Silver) - 3:57
5. "The Barbarians" - 6:39
6. "Work Song" (Nat Adderley) - 2:55
7. "Slide Slid" - 2:52
8. "Day In, Day Out" (Rube Bloom, Johnny Mercer) - 4:37
9. "Red Top" (Ben Kynard, Lionel Hampton) - 6:20

== Personnel ==
- Slide Hampton - trombone, arranger
- Hobart Dotson, Willie Thomas - trumpet
- Benny Jacobs-El - trombone
- George Coleman - tenor saxophone
- Jay Cameron - baritone saxophone
- Horace Parlan - piano
- Eddie Khan - bass
- Vinnie Ruggiero - drums
- Ray Barretto - percussion
