= Listen to Barry Harris =

Studio album by Barry Harris
- Released: 1961
- Recorded: December 7, 1960
- Studio: Plaza Sound Studios, New York City
- Genre: Jazz
- Length: 38:30
- Label: Riverside; RLP 392
- Producer: Orrin Keepnews

Barry Harris chronology
Preminado (1961)	Listen to Barry Harris (1961)	Newer Than New (1961)

Listen to Barry Harris (subtitled Solo Piano) is a solo album by pianist Barry Harris recorded in 1960 and released on the Riverside label.

== Reception ==
Professional ratings
Review scores
Source	Rating
Allmusic	4/5 stars
Down Beat	4.5/5 stars
The Penguin Guide to Jazz Recordings	3.5/4 stars

Allmusic awarded the album 4 stars with its review by Jim Todd stating, "Split between standards and originals, the set hears the 31-year-old pianist evoking Art Tatum, Bud Powell, Thelonious Monk, and occasional hints of Fats Waller in performances that defy easy classification as bop, swing, or mainstream. Essentially, it's Harris working within the songs, opening up new pathways in and around the melodic and harmonic structures".

== Track listing ==
All compositions by Barry Harris except as indicated

1. "The Londonderry Air" (Traditional) - 4:10
2. "Mutattra" - 3:14
3. "Louise" (Leo Robin, Richard A. Whiting) - 3:43
4. "Body and Soul" (Frank Eyton, Johnny Green, Edward Heyman, Robert Sour) - 4:01
5. "Ascension" - 3:48
6. "Anachronism" - 4:51
7. "I Didn't Know What Time It Was" (Lorenz Hart, Richard Rodgers) - 4:53
8. "Teenie" - 3:42
9. "Sphere" - 4:01
10. "Dancing in the Dark" (Howard Dietz, Arthur Schwartz) - 2:07

== Personnel ==
- Barry Harris - piano
