= Focus (Bill Hardman album) =

Studio album by Bill Hardman
- Released: 1984
- Recorded: April 17, 1980
- Studio: Sound Heights Studio, Brooklyn, NY
- Genre: Jazz
- Length: 38:14
- Label: Muse; MR 5259
- Producer: Fred Seibert

Bill Hardman chronology
Home (1978)	Focus (1984)	Politely (1981)

Home is an album by American jazz trumpeter Bill Hardman which was recorded in 1980 but not released on the Muse label until 1984.

== Reception ==
Professional ratings
Review scores
Source	Rating
AllMusic	3/5 stars

The AllMusic review by Scott Yanow stated, "Always a bit underrated and overshadowed, trumpeter Bill Hardman was a solid soloist in the tradition of Clifford Brown. He led three Muse albums during 1978-81, of which this was the second. ... Hardman is heard in top form".

== Track listing ==
1. "Avila & Tequila" (Hank Mobley) − 6:04
2. "Cubicle" (Walter Bishop Jr.) − 6:15
3. "Too Little, Too Late" (Bill Lee) − 6:04
4. "Focus" (Tadd Dameron) − 5:32
5. "My One and Only Love" (Guy Wood, Robert Mellin) − 9:10
6. "Minority" (Basheer Qusim) − 5:09

== Personnel ==
- Bill Hardman − trumpet
- Junior Cook − tenor saxophone
- Slide Hampton − trombone
- Walter Bishop Jr. − piano
- Stafford James − bass
- Leroy Williams − drums
- Mark Elf − guitar
