= Barry Harris =

American jazz pianist and educator (1929–2021)

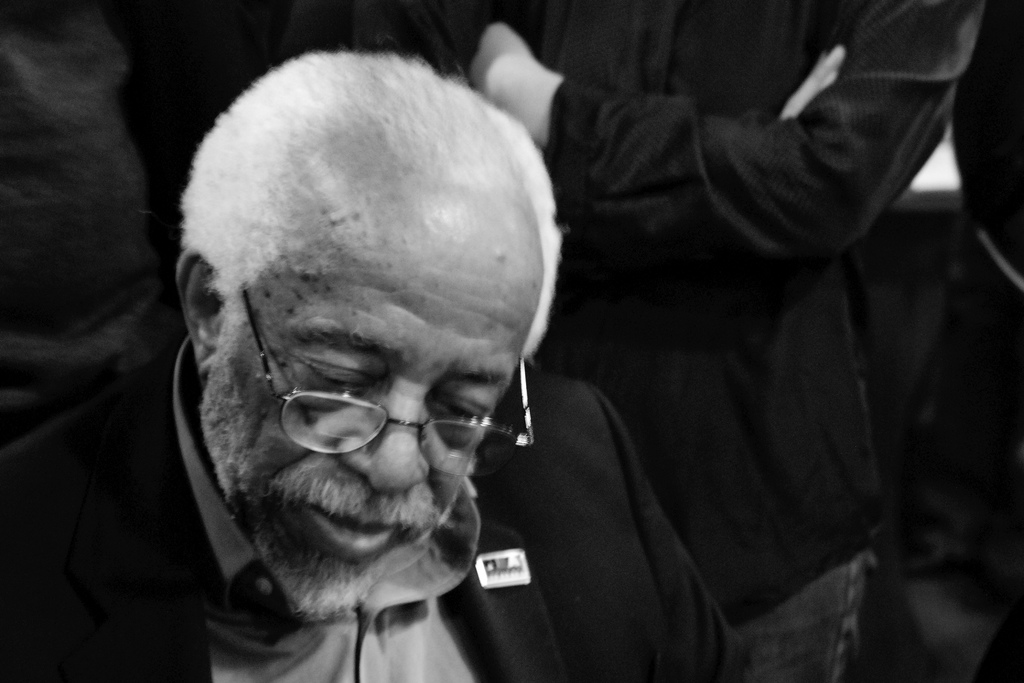
- Harris in 2007

Background information
- Born: Barry Doyle Harris; December 15, 1929; Detroit, Michigan, U.S.
- Died: December 8, 2021 (aged 91) North Bergen, New Jersey, U.S.
- Genre: Jazz
- Occupations: Musician, bandleader, composer, teacher
- Instrument: Piano
- Years active: 1950s–2021
- Labels: Prestige, Riverside, Xanadu
- Formerly of: Cannonball Adderley, Dexter Gordon, Coleman Hawkins, Illinois Jacquet, Yusef Lateef, Thelonious Monk, Lee Morgan, Charlie Parker, Bud Powell, Max Roach, Ryo Fukui
- Website: barryharris.com

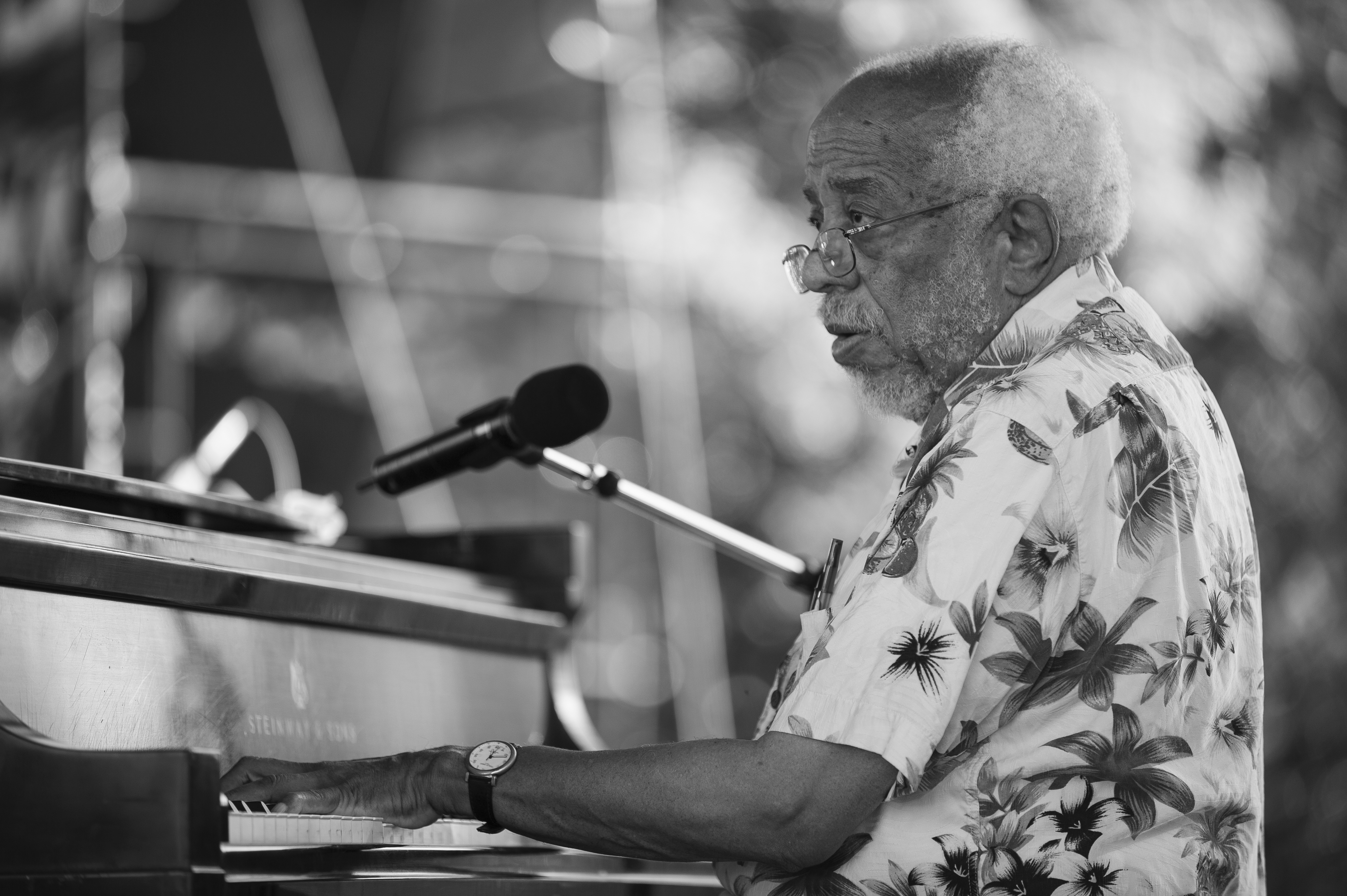
Harris at the Detroit International Jazz Festival

Barry Doyle Harris (December 15, 1929 – December 8, 2021) was an American jazz pianist, bandleader, composer, arranger, and educator. He was an exponent of the bebop style. Influenced by Thelonious Monk and Bud Powell, Harris in turn influenced and mentored bebop musicians including Donald Byrd, Paul Chambers, Curtis Fuller, Joe Henderson, Charles McPherson, and Michael Weiss.

== Early life ==
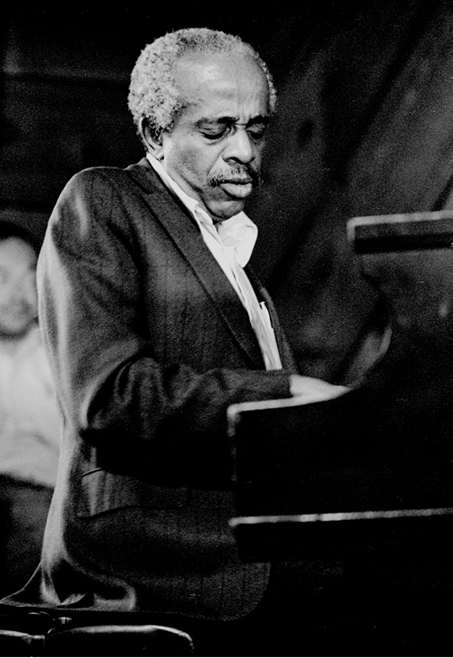
Harris in 1981

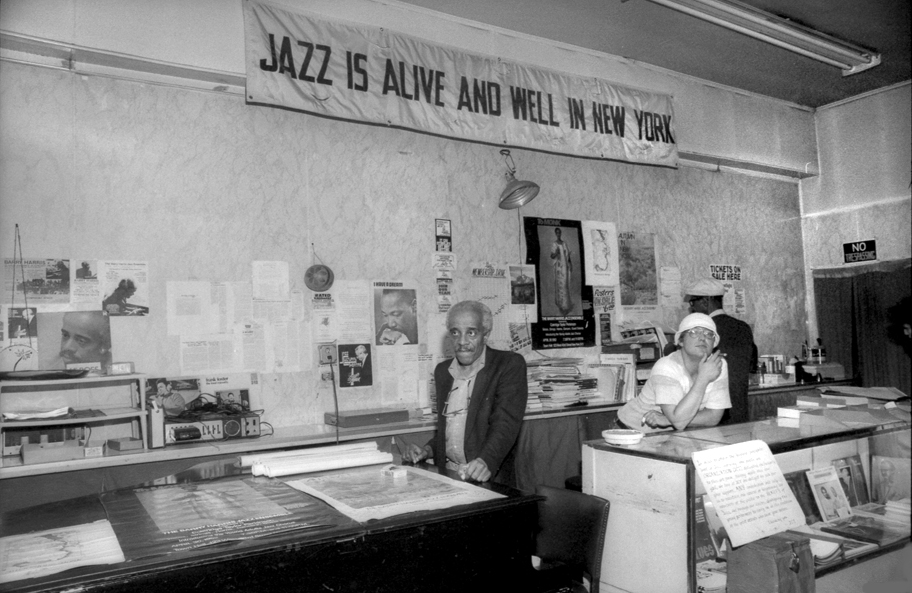
Harris at the Jazz Cultural Theater, New York City, July 21, 1984

Harris was born on December 15, 1929, in Detroit, Michigan, to Melvin and Bessie Harris as the fourth of their five children. Harris took piano lessons from his mother at the age of four. His mother, a church pianist, asked him if he was interested in playing church music or jazz, and he chose the latter. In his teens, he performed for dances at his high school, local clubs and ballrooms.

Harris's family home became a popular jam session destination for young jazz musicians including Roland Hanna, Sonny Red, Donald Byrd, and Harold McKenny. Many Motown pioneers, including Berry Gordy, were friends of Harris in his youth.

== Career ==
=== 1946–1960: Detroit ===
Harris, who described Bud Powell's style as the "epitome" of jazz, learned bebop largely by ear, starting with Powell's recording of "Webb City" with Sonny Stitt and Fats Navarro. Harris made one of his first recordings in Toledo, Ohio, in 1950, and made another in Detroit in 1952 with trombonist Frank Rosolino. Harris said in a later interview that he also recorded a musical for Willie "Face" Smith around this time, but the album was lost.

Harris remained in Detroit through the 1950s and worked with Miles Davis, Sonny Stitt, and Thad Jones, and substituted for Junior Mance in Gene Ammons' band. In 1956, he toured briefly with Max Roach, after Richie Powell, the band's pianist and younger brother of Bud Powell, died in a car crash. Harris left Detroit in 1960 to tour with the Cannonball Adderley quintet.

=== 1960–1982: New York ===
Harris performed with Cannonball Adderley's quintet and on television with them. After moving to New York City, he worked as an educator and performed with Dexter Gordon, Illinois Jacquet, Yusef Lateef and Hank Mobley. Harris was a sideman on Lee Morgan's famous album The Sidewinder and returned to recording as leader following his move to New York.

Between 1965 and 1969, Harris worked extensively with Coleman Hawkins at the Village Vanguard and was one of the few musicians who continued to play bebop in Harlem during the shift toward jazz fusion in the late 1960s.

During the 1970s, Harris lived with Monk at the Weehawken, New Jersey, home of the jazz patron Baroness Pannonica de Koenigswarter. He substituted for Monk in rehearsals at the New York Jazz Repertory Company in 1974.

In Japan, Harris performed at the Yubin Chokin concert hall in Tokyo over two days, and his performances were recorded and compiled into an album released by Xanadu Records.

=== 1982–2021: Jazz educator ===
Between 1982 and 1987, he was responsible for the Jazz Cultural Theatre on 8th Avenue in New York. As a co-manager with promoters Jim Harrison and Frank Fuentes, Harris brought jazz artists to the club, including Jaki Byard, Bill Hardman, Junior Cook, Vernel Fournier, Walter Bishop Jr., Michael Weiss, and Chris Anderson, before closing the club due to increased rent.

From the 1990s onwards, Harris collaborated with Howard Rees on videos and workbooks documenting his harmonic and improvisational systems and teaching process. He held music workshop sessions in New York City for vocalists, students of piano and other instruments.

Harris received an honorary doctorate from Northeastern University and a joint award with Oscar Peterson and Hank Jones from the National Academy of Recording Arts and Sciences.

Harris appeared in the 1989 documentary film Thelonious Monk: Straight, No Chaser (made by Clint Eastwood's production company), performing duets with Tommy Flanagan. In 1999, he was profiled in the film Barry Harris: Spirit of Bebop.

Although Harris took his weekly workshops onto Zoom during the COVID-19 pandemic, he died from complications of the virus at a hospital in North Bergen, New Jersey, on December 8, 2021, a week before his 92nd birthday. Harris taught his last music class less than three weeks before his death.

== Personal life ==
Harris married Christine Brown in 1953; they remained married until her death in 2017. He suffered a stroke in 1993, but was able to continue his career and play in public after recovering.

== Awards and honors ==
- 1989: NEA Jazz Master
- 1995: Doctor of Arts – Honorary Degree by Northwestern University
- 1995: Honorary Jazz Award by the House of Representatives
- 1995: Presidential Award, Recognition of Dedication and Commitment to the Pursuance of Artistic Excellence in Jazz Performance and Education
- 1997: Dizzy Gillespie Achievement Award
- 1997: Recognition of Excellence in Jazz Music and Education
- 1998: Congratulatory Letter as a Jazz Musician and Educator by the U.S. White House
- 1998: Lifetime Achievements Award for Contributions to the Music World from the National Association of Negro Musicians
- 2000: American Jazz Hall of Fame for Lifetime Achievements & Contributions to the World of Jazz

== Discography ==
=== As leader ===
Recording date	Title	Label	Year released	Personnel/Notes
1958–07	Breakin' It Up	Argo	1959	Trio, with William Austin (bass), Frank Gant (drums)
1960–05	Barry Harris at the Jazz Workshop	Riverside	1960	Trio, with Sam Jones (bass), Louis Hayes (drums); in concert
1960–12	Listen to Barry Harris	Riverside	1961	Solo piano
1960–12, 1961-01	Preminado	Riverside	1961	One track solo piano; other tracks trio, with Joe Benjamin (bass), Elvin Jones (drums)
1961–09	Newer Than New	Riverside	1961	Quintet, with Lonnie Hillyer (trumpet), Charles McPherson (alto sax), Ernie Farrow (bass), Clifford Jarvis (drums)
1962–05, 1962-08	Chasin' the Bird	Riverside	1962	Trio, with Bob Cranshaw, (bass), Clifford Jarvis (drums)
1967–04	Luminescence!	Prestige	1967	Sextet, with Slide Hampton (trombone), Junior Cook (tenor sax), Pepper Adams (baritone sax), Bob Cranshaw (bass), Lenny McBrowne (drums)
1968–06	Bull's Eye!	Prestige	1968	Some tracks trio, with Paul Chambers (bass), Billy Higgins (drums); some tracks quintet, with Kenny Dorham (trumpet), Charles McPherson (tenor sax), Pepper Adams (baritone sax) added
1969–11	Magnificent!	Prestige	1970	Trio, with Ron Carter (bass), Leroy Williams (drums)
1972	Vicissitudes	MPS	1975	Trio, with George Duvivier (bass), Leroy Williams (drums)
1975–06	Barry Harris Plays Tadd Dameron	Xanadu	1975	Trio, with Gene Taylor (bass), Leroy Williams (drums)
1976–04	Live in Tokyo	Xanadu	1976	Trio, with Sam Jones (bass), Leroy Williams (drums); in concert
1978–01	Barry Harris Plays Barry Harris	Xanadu	1978	Trio, with George Duvivier (bass), Leroy Williams (drums)
1979–09	The Bird of Red and Gold	Xanadu	1982	Solo piano; Harris also sings on one track
1984–03	For the Moment	Uptown	1985	Trio, with Rufus Reid (bass), Leroy Williams (drums); in concert
1990–03	Live at Maybeck Recital Hall, Volume Twelve	Concord	1991	Solo piano; in concert
1991	Post Master Class Concert	Blue Jack Jazz Records	2005	Trio, with Jacques Schols (bass), Eric Ineke (drums); in concert
1991–09	Confirmation	Candid	1992	Quartet, with Kenny Barron (piano), Ray Drummond (bass), Ben Riley (drums); in concert
1991–12	Barry Harris in Spain	Nuba	1992	Trio, with Chuck Israels (bass), Leroy Williams (drums); in concert
1995–05	Live at "Dug"	Enja	1997	Trio, with Kunimitsu Inaba (bass), Fumio Watanabe (drums); in concert
1996–10	First Time Ever	Alfa Jazz	1997	Trio, with George Mraz (bass), Leroy Williams (drums)
1998–04	I'm Old Fashioned	Alfa Jazz	1998	Most tracks trio, with George Mraz (bass), Leroy Williams (drums); two tracks with Barry Harris Family Chorus (vocals) added
2000–06	The Last Time I Saw Paris	Venus	2000	Trio, with George Mraz (bass), Leroy Williams (drums)
2002–08	Live in New York	Reservoir	2003	Quintet, with Charles Davis (tenor sax), Roni Ben-Hur (guitar), Paul West (bass), Leroy Williams (drums); in concert
2004–05	Live from New York!, Vol. One	Lineage	2006	Trio, with John Webber (bass), Leroy Williams (drums); in concert
2009–11	Live in Rennes	Plus Loin	2010	Trio, with Mathias Allamane (bass), Philippe Soirat (drums); in concert

=== As sideman ===
With Al Cohn

- Play It Now (Xanadu, 1975)
- Al Cohn's America (Xanadu, 1976)
- No Problem (Xanadu, 1979)

With Dexter Gordon

- Clubhouse (Blue Note, 1979) – rec. 1965
- Gettin' Around (Blue Note, 1965)
- The Tower of Power! (Prestige, 1969)
- More Power! (Prestige, 1969)
- True Blue with Al Cohn (Xanadu, 1976)
- Silver Blue with Al Cohn (Xanadu, 1976)
- Biting the Apple (SteepleChase, 1976)

With Johnny Griffin

- White Gardenia (Riverside, 1961)
- The Kerry Dancers (Riverside, 1962) – rec. 1961–62

With Coleman Hawkins

- Wrapped Tight (Impulse!, 1965)
- Sirius (Pablo, 1974) – rec. 1966

With Buck Hill

- Capital Hill (Muse, 1990)
- The Buck Stops Here (Muse, 1992)

With Sam Jones

- Cello Again (Xanadu, 1975)
- Changes & Things (Xanadu, 1977)

With Yusef Lateef

- Eastern Sounds (Moodsville, 1960)
- Into Something (New Jazz, 1961)
- Suite 16 (Atlantic, 1970)

With Charles McPherson

- Bebop Revisited! (Prestige, 1964)
- Con Alma! (Prestige, 1965)
- The Quintet/Live! (Prestige, 1966)
- McPherson's Mood (Prestige, 1969)
- Charles McPherson (Mainstream, 1971)
- Siku Ya Bibi (Day of the Lady) (Mainstream, 1972)
- Today's Man (Mainstream, 1973)
- Live in Tokyo (Xanadu, 1976)

With Hank Mobley

- Mobley's Message (Prestige 1956)
- Jazz Message No. 2 (Savoy, 1957)
- The Turnaround (Blue Note, 1965)

With Lee Morgan

- Take Twelve (Jazzland, 1962)
- The Sidewinder (Blue Note, 1963)

With Sonny Red

- Breezing (Jazzland, 1960)
- The Mode (Jazzland, 1961)
- Images (Jazzland, 1961)

With Red Rodney

- Bird Lives! (Muse, 1973)
- Home Free (Muse, 1979) – rec. 1977

With Sonny Stitt

- Burnin' (Argo, 1958)
- Tune-Up! (Cobblestone, 1972)
- Constellation (Cobblestone, 1972)
- 12! (Muse, 1972)
- My Buddy: Sonny Stitt Plays for Gene Ammons (Muse, 1975)
- Blues for Duke (Muse, 1978) – rec. 1975
- Moonlight in Vermont (Savoy, 1977)
- In Style (Muse, 1982)

With others

- Cannonball Adderley, Them Dirty Blues (Riverside, 1960)
- Joshua Breakstone, Wonderful! (Sonora, 1984)
- Charlie Byrd, Blues Sonata (Riverside, 1961)
- Donald Byrd, Byrd Jazz (Transition, 1955) – also released as First Flight (Delmark)
- Sonny Criss, Saturday Morning (Xanadu, 1975)
- Art Farmer and Donald Byrd, 2 Trumpets (Prestige, 1956)
- Dan Faulk, Focusing In (Criss Cross Jazz, 1992)
- Terry Gibbs, Bopstacle Course (Xanadu, 1974)
- Benny Golson, The Other Side of Benny Golson (Riverside, 1958)
- Louis Hayes, Louis Hayes (Vee-Jay, 1960)
- Jimmy Heath, Picture of Heath (Xanadu, 1975)
- Illinois Jacquet, Bottoms Up (Prestige, 1968)
- Eddie Jefferson, Body and Soul (Prestige, 1968)
- Carmell Jones, Jay Hawk Talk (Prestige, 1965)
- Thad Jones, The Magnificent Thad Jones (Blue Note, 1956)
- Clifford Jordan, Repetition (Soul Note, 1984)
- Lee Konitz, Lullaby of Birdland (Candid, 1991 [1994])
- Harold Land, West Coast Blues! (Jazzland, 1960)
- Warne Marsh, Back Home (Criss Cross Jazz, 1986)
- Earl May, Swinging the Blues (Arbors, 2005)
- Billy Mitchell, The Colossus of Detroit (Xanadu, 1978)
- James Moody, Don't Look Away Now! (Prestige, 1969)
- Frank Morgan, You Must Believe in Spring (Antilles, 1992)
- Sal Nistico, Heavyweights (Jazzland, 1961)
- Dave Pike, It's Time for Dave Pike (Riverside, 1961)
- Jack Sheldon, Playing for Change (Uptown, 1997) – rec. 1986
- Don Wilkerson, The Texas Twister (Riverside, 1960)

== See also ==
- Bebop scale or 6th Diminished Scale, jazz education tool pioneered by Harris
