= Leroy Williams =

American jazz drummer (1941–2022)

Leroy Williams (February 3, 1937 – June 1, 2022) was an American drummer, mostly known for his work in jazz.

Williams first began playing drums as a teenager in the 1950s. From 1959 to the middle of the 1960s he played with singer Judy Roberts, and following this he moved to New York City and played with Booker Ervin in 1967. In 1968 he played with Sonny Rollins, Archie Shepp, and Clifford Jordan; in 1969 he first began playing with Barry Harris, with whom he would collaborate often. 1970 saw him playing with Hank Mobley, Wilbur Ware, and Thelonious Monk, the latter of which he went with on a tour of Japan. Later in the 1970s he played with Yusef Lateef, Ray Bryant, Charles McPherson, Stan Getz, Andrew Hill, Sonny Stitt, Junior Cook, Al Cohn, Buddy Tate, and Bob Wilber.

In the 1980s Williams played with Art Davis, Barry Harris, Tommy Flanagan, Steve Turre, and Bill Hardman. In the 1990s he performed with Anthony Braxton, Lee Konitz, Ralph Lalama, and Pete Malinverni. He was a member of the group El Mollenium with Roni Ben-Hur, Bertha Hope, and Walter Booker. He recorded with Rodney Kendrick, Roy Hargrove, and Justin Roberson.

== Discography ==
=== As sideman ===
With Pepper Adams

- The Master... (Muse, 1980)

With Anthony Braxton

- 9 Standards (Quartet) 1993 (Leo, 1993)

With Al Cohn

- Al Cohn's America (Xanadu, 1976)

With Junior Cook

- Pressure Cooker (Catalyst, 1977)
- Good Cookin' (Muse, 1979)
- The Place to Be (SteepleChase, 1988)
- On a Misty Night (SteepleChase, 1989)

With Ted Dunbar

- Opening Remarks (Xanadu, 1978)

With Slide Hampton

- World of Trombones (West 54, 1979)

With Bill Hardman

- Focus (1980 [1984])
- Politely (Muse, 1981 [1982])
- What's Up (SteepleChase, 1989)

With Barry Harris

- Magnificent! (Prestige, 1969)
- Vicissitudes (MPS, 1972)
- Barry Harris Plays Tadd Dameron (Xanadu, 1975)
- Live in Tokyo (Xanadu, 1976)
- Barry Harris Plays Barry Harris (Xanadu, 1978)
- For the Moment (Uptown, 1985)

With Andrew Hill

- Blue Black (East Wind, 1975)
- Divine Revelation (Steeplechase, 1975)

With Lee Konitz

- Lullaby of Birdland (Candid, 1991 [1994])

With Samuel Lerner

- Zombi(e)bop (Black & Blue, 2014)

With Charles McPherson

- Charles McPherson (Mainstream, 1971)
- Siku Ya Bibi (Day of the Lady) (Mainstream, 1972)
- Beautiful! (Xanadu, 1975)
- Live in Tokyo (Xanadu, 1976)

With Hank Mobley

- Thinking of Home (Blue Note, 1970)

With Frank Morgan

- Bop! (Telarc, 1997)

With John Patton

- Accent on the Blues (Blue Note, 1969)
- Memphis to New York Spirit (Blue Note, 1969-70 [1996])

With Jimmy Raney

- Live in Tokyo (Xanadu, 1976)

With Red Rodney

- Home Free (Muse, 1977 [1979])

With Sonny Stitt

- My Buddy: Sonny Stitt Plays for Gene Ammons (Muse, 1975)

With Warren Vache

- The Warren Vache Quintet Remembers Benny Carter (Arbors, 2015)

With Doug Lawrence

- Soul Carnival (Fable, 1997)

With Ryo Fukui

- In New York (1999)
