= New York Jazz Repertory Company =

Jazz big band ensemble founded in 1974 by George Wein

The New York Jazz Repertory Company was a jazz big band ensemble founded in 1974 by George Wein.

Wein organized the group to play at the Newport Jazz Festival, which they did for several years. The group had a shifting lineup and had several musical directors. George Russell was its leader for a time, and the group performed some of Russell's compositions during his tenure. Gil Evans also led the group for performances of his own music, in addition to organizing a tribute to Jimi Hendrix. Paul Jeffrey was the group's bandleader when it was joined by Thelonious Monk. Dick Hyman organized tributes to Louis Armstrong, Duke Ellington, and Jelly Roll Morton, and was the leader for the group's tours of the Soviet Union in 1975 and France in 1977. Sy Oliver and Budd Johnson also led swing music tributes. In 1980, the group played at the White House with Lou Stein directing, once again paying tribute to Armstrong.

== Discography ==
- Satchmo Remembered - The Music of Louis Armstrong at Carnegie Hall (Atlantic Records, 1975)
