= Live at Maybeck Recital Hall, Volume Twelve =

Live album by Barry Harris
- Released: 1991
- Recorded: March 12, 1990
- Venue: Maybeck Recital Hall, Berkeley, California, U.S.
- Genre: Jazz
- Label: Concord

Live at Maybeck Recital Hall, Volume Twelve is an album of solo performances by jazz pianist Barry Harris, recorded in 1990.

== Music and recording ==
The album was recorded in March 1990 at the Maybeck Recital Hall in Berkeley, California. The performances are chiefly bebop-based, although some of the compositions are not.

== Release and reception ==
Professional ratings
Review scores
Source	Rating
AllMusic	4/5 stars
The Penguin Guide to Jazz	4/4 stars
Tom Hull – on the Web	B+
The Rolling Stone Jazz & Blues Album Guide	4/5 stars

Live at Maybeck Recital Hall, Volume Twelve was released by Concord Records. The Penguin Guide to Jazz wrote that Harris "finds just the right pace and programme".

== Track listing ==
1. "It Could Happen to You"
2. "All God's Chillun Got Rhythm"
3. "She"
4. "Cherokee"
5. "Gone Again"
6. "Lucky Day"
7. "It Never Entered My Mind/Meet the Flintstones/I Love Lucy"
8. "Would You Like to Take a Walk?"
9. "I'll Keep Loving You"
10. "Parker's Mood"

== Personnel ==
- Barry Harris – piano
