= Chasin' the Bird (song) =

Composition
- Recorded: May 8, 1947. New York City, US
- Genre: Jazz, bebop
- Label: Savoy
- Composer(s): Charlie Parker

"Chasin' the Bird" is a composition by Charlie Parker. The original version, by Parker's quintet, was recorded on May 8, 1947. It has become a jazz standard.

== Composition ==
"Chasin' the Bird" is an unusual composition for Parker. Its theme "contains two simultaneous and interlocking melodies played contrapuntally by alto and trumpet." The structure is AABA and the harmony is based on that of "I Got Rhythm", in the key of F.

== Original recording ==
The composition was first recorded by Parker's quintet, which contained Parker (alto saxophone), Miles Davis (trumpet), Bud Powell (piano), Tommy Potter (bass), and Max Roach (drums). The recording session was in New York City on May 8, 1947, for Savoy Records.
