= Slide Hampton =

American trombonist (1932–2021)

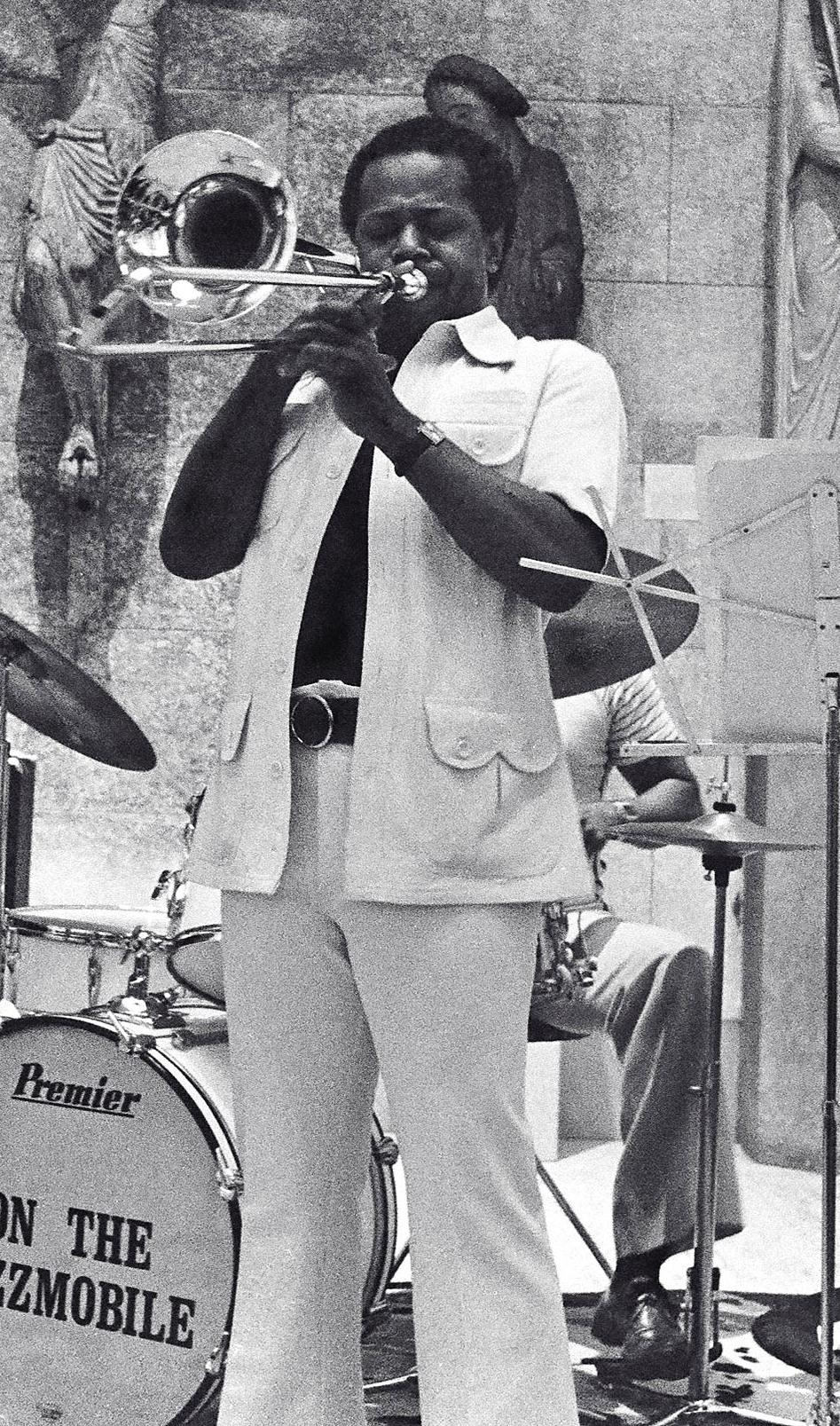
- Slide Hampton at a concert in August 1978

Background information
- Born: Locksley Wellington Hampton; April 21, 1932; Jeannette, Pennsylvania, U.S.
- Died: November 18, 2021 (aged 89) Orange, New Jersey, U.S.
- Genres: Jazz
- Occupation: Musician
- Instrument(s): Trombone, tuba, flugelhorn
- Years active: 1950s–2021
- Labels: MCG Jazz, Atlantic, Epic
- Website: www.slidehampton.com

Locksley Wellington Hampton (April 21, 1932 – November 18, 2021) was an American jazz trombonist, composer and arranger. As his nickname implies, Hampton's main instrument was slide trombone, but he also occasionally played tuba and flugelhorn.

== Biography ==
=== Early life and career ===
Locksley Wellington Hampton was born on April 21, 1932, in Jeannette, Pennsylvania. Laura and Clarke "Deacon" Hampton raised 12 children, taught them how to play musical instruments and set out with them as a family band. The family first came to Indianapolis in 1938. The Hamptons were a very musical family in which mother, father, eight brothers, and four sisters, all played instruments. His sisters included Dawn Hampton and Virtue Hampton Whitted. Slide Hampton is one of the few left-handed trombone players. As a child, Hampton was given the trombone set up to play left-handed, or backwards; and as no one ever dissuaded him, he continued to play this way.

At the age of 12, Slide played in his family's Indianapolis jazz band, The Duke Hampton Band. By 1952, at the age of 20, he was performing at Carnegie Hall with the Lionel Hampton Band. He played with the Buddy Johnson's R&B band from 1955 to 1956, then became a member of Maynard Ferguson's band (1957–1959), where he played and arranged, providing excitement on such popular tunes as "The Fugue," "Three Little Foxes" and "Slide's Derangement." While with the Ferguson band he composed and arranged memorable charts such as "Frame For the Blues," "Go East Young Man," "Newport," Sometimes I Feel Lika A Motherless Child," "Ole" and "'Round Midnight." In 1958, he recorded with trombone masters on the classic release of Melba Liston, Melba Liston and Her 'Bones. As his reputation grew, he soon began working with bands led by Art Blakey, Tadd Dameron, Barry Harris, Thad Jones, Mel Lewis, and Max Roach, contributing both original compositions and arrangements. In 1962, he formed the Slide Hampton Octet, with horn players Freddie Hubbard, and George Coleman. The band toured the U.S. and Europe and recorded on several labels.

=== From 1968 ===
In 1968, he toured with Woody Herman's orchestra, settling in Europe where he remained until 1977. He taught at Harvard, artist-in-residence in 1981, the University of Massachusetts Amherst, De Paul University, and Indiana State University. During this period he led World of Trombones, his own nine-trombone, three-rhythm band; co-led Continuum, a quintet with Jimmy Heath that plays the music of Tadd Dameron; and freelanced as a writer and a player. He also played the trombone in Diana Ross Live! The Lady Sings... Jazz & Blues: Stolen Moments (1992), DVD.

On June 4, 2006, Hampton and long time manager and writing partner Anthony-charles:Bey promoted his first self funded concert at The Tribeca PAC in New York City (a tribute to Antonio Carlos Jobim) and debuted the Slide Hampton™ Ultra-Big Band. The concert was the first of many planned for the near future.

In 2009, Hampton completed four new compositions collectively titled "A Tribute to African-American Greatness". The songs honored Nelson Mandela, Oprah Winfrey, Tiger Woods, Venus Williams, Serena Williams and Barack Obama. The songs contained accompanying lyrics written by Hampton and manager/writing partner Anthony-charles:Bey, arrangements honoring Thelonious Monk, Thad Jones, Eddie Harris, Dexter Gordon and Gil Evans round out the program. He completed two new Big Band arrangements – "In Case of Emergency" and "The Drum Song" (both Hampton originals). These two songs (and others) will be available exclusively to universities and other educational institutions through Slide Hampton™ Musique/Music Publishing-in-trust.

Hampton was a resident of Orange, New Jersey. He died on November 18, 2021, at the age of 89.

== Awards and honors ==
In 1998, he won a Grammy Award for "Best Jazz Arrangement Accompanying Vocalist(s)", as arranger for "Cotton Tail" performed by Dee Dee Bridgewater. He was also a Grammy winner in 2005 for "Best Large Jazz Ensemble Album," The Way: Music of Slide Hampton, The Vanguard Jazz Orchestra (Planet Arts), and received another nomination in 2006 for his arrangement of "Stardust" for the Dizzy Gillespie All-Star Big Band.

In 2005 Hampton was honored at the jazz festival in Indianapolis. There the Indianapolis Jazz Foundation inducted him into their Hall of Fame.

In 2005, the National Endowment for the Arts honored Slide Hampton with its highest honor in jazz, the NEA Jazz Masters Award.

== Discography ==
=== As leader ===
Year	Title	Label	Notes
1959	Slide Hampton and His Horn of Plenty	Strand	
1960	Sister Salvation	Atlantic	
1960	Somethin' Sanctified	Atlantic	
1961	Two Sides of Slide Hampton	Charlie Parker	
1962	Jazz with a Twist	Atlantic	
1962	Drum Suite	Epic	
1962	Explosion! The Sound of Slide Hampton	Atlantic	
1962	Exodus	Philips	
1965	Harold Betters Meets Slide Hampton	Gateway	
1968	Mellow-dy	LRC	Released in 1992
1968	Slide Hampton Big Band	Barclay	
1968	Back to Jazz	EMI	
1969	The Fabulous Slide Hampton Quartet	Pathé	
1969	A Day in Copenhagen	MPS	With Dexter Gordon
1970	Umeå Big Band & Slide Hampton in Montreux	Gazell	With Umeå Big Band
1971	Trombone Workshop	MPS	With Albert Mangelsdorff, Åke Persson & Jiggs Whigham
1972	Life Music	Carosello	
1972	Jazz a Confronto 18	Horo	With Dusko Goykovich
1972	Euro Jazz	Supraphon	With Václav Zahradník
1974	Give Me a Double	MPS	With Joe Haider
1979	World of Trombones	West 54	
1984	Art Farmer & Slide Hampton in Concert	Enja	With Art Farmer
1984	Cees Slinger-Slide Hampton Quintet in Concert	Vara Jazz	With Cees Slinger
1985	Roots	Criss Cross	With Clifford Jordan
1993	Dedicated to Diz	Telarc	
1997	Jazz Matinee	Hänssler Classic	With SWR Big Band
1998	Inclusion	Twin	
2002	Slide Plays Jobim	Alleycat Productions	
2002	Spirit of the Horn	MCG Jazz	
2002	Americans Swinging in Paris	EMI	
2005	Mellow-Dy	LRC Ltd.	
2006	The Cloister Suite	Gryphon	
2008	The Whit Williams "Now's The Time" Big Band	MAMA	
2011	Two Sides of Slide Hampton	Hallmark	
2011	Essential Jazz Masters	Stardust	
2012	Happy Point	Jazz Room	
2012	Explosion!	Hallmark	
2013	Charlie Parker Records: The Complete Collection, Vol. 5	Universal Remasterings	
2014	Drum Suite Parts I, II, II, IV & V (Bonus Track Version)	The Jazz Corner	
2016	Complete Studio Recordings by the Slide Hampton Octet (Bonus Track Version)	Jazz Lovers	
2016	Sister Salvation + Explosion! (Bonus Track Version)	Treasury Jazz	

=== As arranger ===
With Junior Cook

- Good Cookin' (Muse, 1979) - also composer and performer

With Maynard Ferguson

- A Message from Newport (Roulette, 1958) – also composer and performer
- Swingin' My Way Through College (Roulette, 1959) – also performer
- Maynard Ferguson Plays Jazz for Dancing (Roulette, 1959) – also performer
- Newport Suite (Roulette, 1960) – also composer
- Let's Face the Music and Dance (Roulette, 1960) – also performer
- Maynard '61 (Roulette, 1961) – also composer and performer
- Maynard '62 (Roulette, 1962) – also composer and performer
- Maynard '64 (Roulette 1959-62 [1963]) – also performer [1 track]

With Dexter Gordon

- Sophisticated Giant (Columbia, 1977) – also composer and performer

With J. J. Johnson

- Goodies (RCA Victor, 1965)

With Melba Liston

- Melba Liston and Her 'Bones (MetroJazz, 1958) - also performer

=== As sideman ===
With Nat Adderley

- Much Brass (Riverside, 1959)

With Art Blakey

- Killer Joe (Union Jazz, 1981) – with George Kawaguchi

With Robin Eubanks

- Different Perspectives (JMT, 1989)

With Maynard Ferguson

- Ridin' High (Enterprise, 1967)

With Art Farmer

- The Meaning of Art (Arabesque, 1995) as arranger and performer

With Curtis Fuller

- Two Bones (Blue Note, 1958 [1980])

With Dizzy Gillespie

- Live at the Royal Festival Hall (Enja, 1989)

With Bill Hardman

- Home (Muse, 1978)
- Focus (Muse, 1980 [1984])

With Barry Harris

- Luminescence! (Prestige, 1967)

With Louis Hayes

- The Real Thing (Muse, 1977)

With Philly Joe Jones

- Advance! (Galaxy, 1978) as arranger and performer
- Drum Song (Galaxy, 1978 [1985]) as arranger and performer

With Sam Jones

- Changes & Things (Xanadu, 1977)
- Something in Common (Muse, 1977)

With Hank Mobley

- The Flip (Blue Note, 1970)

With Charles Mingus

- Mingus Revisited (1960)

With Mark Murphy

- Satisfaction Guaranteed (Muse, 1980)

With Oliver Nelson

- Berlin Dialogue for Orchestra (Flying Dutchman, 1970)

With Claudio Roditi

- Claudio! (Uptown, 1985)

With Rob Schneiderman

- New Outlook (Reservoir, 1988)

With Woody Shaw

- The Woody Shaw Concert Ensemble at the Berliner Jazztage (Muse, 1976)

With McCoy Tyner

- 13th House (Milestone, 1981)
- Turning Point (Birdology, 1992)
- Journey (Birdology, 1993)

With Randy Weston

- Destry Rides Again (United Artists, 1959)
- Uhuru Afrika (Roulette, 1960)
