= Peter Leitch (musician) =

Canadian jazz guitarist (1944–2024)

- Born: Peter John Leitch; August 19, 1944; Montreal, Quebec, Canada
- Died: December 30, 2024 (aged 80) New York City, U.S.
- Genres: Jazz
- Occupations: Musician, journalist, photographer
- Instrument: Guitar
- Years active: 1980–2024
- Labels: Jazz House, Criss Cross, Reservoir, Concord
- Website: www.peterleitch.com

Peter John Leitch (August 19, 1944 – December 30, 2024) was a Canadian jazz guitarist.

== Life and career ==
Leitch started playing guitar in his teens. He accompanied many different acts at nightclubs in Montreal. He recorded with Sadik Hakim in the early 1970s. During the late 1970s, he worked in Toronto with Milt Jackson, Red Norvo, and Kenny Wheeler and went on tour with Fraser MacPherson in the Soviet Union. He was also a member of the Al Grey-Jimmy Forrest quintet. In the early 1980s he moved to New York City, where he played with Gary Bartz, Jaki Byard, Ray Drummond, John Hicks, Kirk Lightsey, Bobby Watson, and Smitty Smith. He recorded with Pepper Adams, Jeri Brown, Dominique Eade, Oscar Peterson, Woody Shaw, and Pete Yellin. He released his first solo album in 1981. He has worked as a journalist, photographer, and teacher. In 2013, he published an autobiography "Off the Books: A Jazz Life."

Leitch announced his retirement on July 21, 2015, on Facebook. "Due to a series of medical issues it is extremely unlikely that I will ever play the guitar again. I would like to send my heartfelt thanks to all those people who have enjoyed, bought, listened to, stolen (lol) or otherwise picked up on the music. The recordings (most of them) are still out there and available. I would also like to thank, of course, those great musicians who collaborated in the making of this music. The music on Sunday nights at Walkers is, for the time being, under the direction of bassist Sean Smith, with the exception of July 26 (bassist Harvie S)."

However, since he was no longer able to play the guitar, he began arranging and composing music for a 12–14 piece ensemble. The Peter Leitch New Life Orchestra debuted at Club 75, the Bogardus Mansion, in New York City's fashionable TriBeCa district, November 30, 2018, and at this writing has a series of upcoming engagements at this location.

Leitch died from lung cancer at home, on December 30, 2024, at the age of 80.

== Discography ==
=== As leader ===
- Jump Street (Pausa, 1982)
- Sometime in Another Life with George McFetridge (Jazz House, 1982)
- Exhilaration (Uptown, 1985)
- Red Zone (Reservoir, 1987)
- On a Misty Night (Criss Cross, 1987)
- Portraits and Dedications (Criss Cross, 1989)
- Mean What You Say (Concord Jazz, 1990)
- Trio/Quartet '91 (Concord Jazz, 1991)
- From Another Perspective (Concord Jazz, 1993)
- A Special Rapport (Reservoir, 1993)
- Duality with John Hicks (Reservoir, 1994)
- Colours & Dimensions (Reservoir, 1995)
- At First Sight with Heiner Franz (Jardis, 1996)
- Up Front (Reservoir, 1997)
- Blues on the Corner (Reservoir, 1999)
- Duo with Gary Bartz, 'The Montreal Concert' (DSM, 2001)
- Autobiography (Reservoir, 2004)
- Self Portrait (Jazz House, 2007)
- California Concert (Jazz House, 2013)
- Landscape (Jazz House, 2014)

=== As a member ===
Free Trade
With Neil Swainson, Renee Rosnes, Ralph Bowen and Terry Clarke

- Free Trade (Justin Time, 1994)

=== As sideman ===
With Jaki Byard

- Phantasies II (Soul Note, 1991)
- My Mother's Eyes (M&I, 2000) – rec. 1998

With Pete Yellin

- Mellow Soul (Metropolitan, 1998)
- How Long Has This Been Going On? (Jazzed Media, 2008)

With others

- Gary Bartz, The Montreal Concert (DSM, 2001)
- Jeri Brown, Unfolding the Peacocks (Justin Time, 1992)
- Dominique Eade, When the Wind Was Cool (RCA, 1997)
- Al Grey, Jimmy Forrest, O.D. (Out 'Dere) (Greyforrest, 1980)
- Sadik Hakim, Sadik Hakim (Radio Canada International, 1973)
- Chris McNulty, Time for Love (Amosaya, 1996)
- Oscar Peterson, The Personal Touch (Pablo, 1980)
- Woody Shaw, Solid (Muse, 1987)
