= On the Spot! =

Studio album by Jaki Byard
- Released: 1967
- Recorded: February 16, 1967
- Studio: Van Gelder Studio, Englewood Cliffs, New Jersey
- Genre: Jazz
- Length: 39:45
- Label: Prestige; PR 7524
- Producer: Don Schlitten

Jaki Byard chronology
Freedom Together! (1966)	On the Spot! (1967)	Sunshine of My Soul (1967)

On the Spot! is an album by the pianist Jaki Byard recorded in 1967 apart from one track from the 1965 live recordings that produced Jaki Byard Quartet Live!. It was released on the Prestige label.

== Reception ==
Professional ratings
Review scores
Source	Rating
Allmusic	3/5 stars
The Rolling Stone Jazz Record Guide	4/5 stars
The Penguin Guide to Jazz Recordings	3/4 stars

Allmusic awarded the album 3 stars with the review by Scott Yanow stating, "the music serves as a perfect outlet for Jaki Byard's eclectic talents".

== Track listing ==
All compositions by Jaki Byard except as indicated

1. "A-Toodle-Oo, Toodle-Oo" - 3:51
2. "I Fall in Love Too Easily" (Sammy Cahn, Jule Styne) - 2:31
3. "Olean Visit" - 5:58
4. "Spanish Tinge" - 6:17
5. "Alexander's Ragtime Band" (Irving Berlin) - 2:34
6. "On the Spot" - 3:22
7. "GEB Piano Roll" - 2:42
8. "Second Balcony Jump" (Billy Eckstine, Gerald Valentine) - 6:57
9. "P.C. Blues" - 2:19
10. "Snow Flakes" - 3:14
- Recorded at Van Gelder Studio in Englewood Cliffs, New Jersey, on February 16, 1967, except track 4 which was recorded live at Lennie's on the Turnpike in West Peabody, Massachusetts, on April 15, 1965.

== Personnel ==
- Jaki Byard - piano, alto saxophone
- Jimmy Owens - trumpet, flugelhorn, tambourine
- Paul Chambers (tracks 1–3 & 5–10), George Tucker (track 4) - double bass
- Alan Dawson (track 4), Billy Higgins (tracks 1–3 & 5–10) - drums
