= Out Front! (Jaki Byard album) =

Studio album by Jaki Byard
- Released: 1965
- Recorded: March 14, 1961 and May 21 & 28, 1964
- Studio: Van Gelder Studio, Englewood Cliffs, New Jersey
- Genre: Jazz
- Length: 44:42
- Label: Prestige; PR 7397
- Producer: Esmond Edwards (track 6), Ozzie Cadena

Jaki Byard chronology
Hi-Fly (1962)	Out Front! (1965)	Jaki Byard Quartet Live! (1965)

Out Front! is an album by pianist Jaki Byard recorded in 1964 (with one track from the 1961 session that produced Here's Jaki) and released on the Prestige label.

== Reception ==
Professional ratings
Review scores
Source	Rating
Allmusic	2.5/5 stars
The Rolling Stone Jazz Record Guide	3/5 stars
The Penguin Guide to Jazz	4/4 stars

Allmusic awarded the album 2½ stars with its review by Scott Yanow stating, "this is a surprisingly conventional set... It's fine music but one has to lower expectations a bit".

The Penguin Guide to Jazz, on the other hand, gave the album a 4 star review, remarking "the early Prestige and New Jazz sets … are uniformly excellent. Out Front! remains our favorite, largely because it shows off Byard's infallible instinct for horn voicings. Tracks like 'European Episode' and 'Lush Life' are well worth studying in some detail."

== Track listing ==
All compositions by Jaki Byard except where noted

1. "Out Front" - 4:18
2. "Two Different Worlds" (Al Frisch, Sid Wayne) - 5:25
3. "Searchlight" - 7:06
4. "European Episode" - 12:02
5. "Lush Life" (Billy Strayhorn) - 3:23
6. "When Sunny Gets Blue" (Marvin Fisher, Jack Segal) - 5:08
7. "I Like to Lead When I Dance" (Sammy Cahn, Jimmy Van Heusen) - 2:30 Bonus track on CD reissue
8. "After the Lights Go Down Low" (Phil Belmonte, Leroy Lovett, Alan White) - 4:50 Bonus track on CD reissue

== Personnel ==
- Jaki Byard - piano, alto saxophone (track 6)
- Richard Williams - trumpet (tracks 3, 4, 7 & 8)
- Booker Ervin - tenor saxophone (tracks 3, 4, 7 & 8)
- Ron Carter (track 6), Bob Cranshaw (tracks 1–5, 7 & 8) - bass
- Roy Haynes (track 6), Walter Perkins (tracks 1–5, 7 & 8) - drums
