= My Mother's Eyes (Jaki Byard album) =

Studio album by Jaki Byard and the Apollo Stompers
- Released: 2000
- Recorded: March 1998
- Genre: Jazz

My Mother's Eyes is an album by jazz pianist Jaki Byard with the Apollo Stompers.

== Background ==
This was pianist Jaki Byard's third album with the Apollo Stompers. The previous two were Phantasies and Phantasies II.

== Music and recording ==
The album was recorded in March 1998. Six of the tracks are Byard originals.

== Releases ==
The album was unreleased at the time of Byard's apparent murder in 1999. It was reissued on January 16, 2013, by M&I.

== Track listing ==
1. "Garr"
2. "My Mother's Eyes"
3. "St. Thomas"
4. "La Rosita"
5. "With a Song in My Heart / Once in a While"
6. "Spanish Tinge"
7. "More Than You Know"
8. "Out Front, Out Back"
9. "As Time Goes By / Misty"
10. "I Don't Know What Kind Of Blues I've Got"
11. "What Is This Thing Called Love?"
12. "Aluminum Baby"
13. "Japanese Sandman"
14. "Darryl"

== Personnel ==
- Jed Levy, David Glasser, Tom Murray, Sam Furnace, Patience Higgins – sax
- Roger Parrett, Al Bryant, Tommy Corcoran, James Zollar – trumpet
- Carl Reinlib, Steve Swell, Jason Forsythe, Dale Turk – trombone
- Jaki Byard – piano
- Peter Leitch – guitar
- Ralph Hamperian – bass
- Richard Allen – drums
