= This Happening =

Studio album by Michael Marcus and Jaki Byard
- Released: May 1997
- Recorded: December 7, 1996
- Studio: Sound on Sound Studios, NYC
- Genre: Jazz
- Label: Justin Time

Professional ratings
Review scores
Source	Rating
AllMusic	2.5/5 stars
The Penguin Guide to Jazz Recordings	4/4 stars

This Happening is an album by multi-instrumentalist Michael Marcus and pianist Jaki Byard.

== Background ==
This was Marcus's second album for Justin Time Records.

== Recording and music ==
Of the nine tracks, seven are originals. Marcus mostly plays saxello and stritch (types of straight saxophone) on the album. On the "Giant Steps" and "Naima" medley, he plays bass clarinet.

== Release ==
The album was released by Justin Time on June 10, 1997.

== Reception ==
The AllMusic reviewer commented that Byard had a largely supporting role, so "although this CD will probably be quite important in the discography of Michael Marcus, it is just a footnote, a lost opportunity, in Jaki Byard's career." The JazzTimes reviewer praised Marcus's tone on the rarely played saxophones.

== Track listing ==
1. "Earth Beings / 3=4" – 5:58
2. "This Happening" – 6:05
3. "Kelso Tracks South" – 4:00
4. "Giant Steps / Naima" – 6:27
5. "Steppin' Down with Jaki" – 6:50
6. "The Cry for Peace" – 5:32
7. "The Continuum" – 4:29
8. "Kelso Tracks North" – 3:14
9. "Darn That Dream" – 6:41

== Personnel ==
- Jaki Byard – piano
- Michael Marcus – saxello, stritch, bass clarinet
