= Involution =

Involution may refer to:

== Mathematics ==
- Involution (mathematics), a function that is its own inverse
- Involution algebra, a *-algebra: a type of algebraic structure
- Involute, a construction in the differential geometry of curves
- Exponentiation (archaic use of the term)

== Socioeconomics ==
- Neijuan, a Chinese term for an economic concept that describes an excess of competition and social pressure
- Agricultural Involution, a 1963 study of intensification of production through increased labour inputs

== Philosophy ==
- Involution (esoterism), several notions of a counterpart to evolution
- Involution (Meher Baba), the inner path of the human soul to the self as described by Meher Baba
- Involution (Sri Aurobindo), term in the philosophy of Sri Aurobindo

== Other uses ==
- Involution (medicine), the shrinking of an organ (such as the uterus after pregnancy)
- Involution (album), a 1998 music album by Michael Marcus and the Jaki Byard trio
