= Live at the Jazz'Inn =

Live album by Jaki Byard
- Released: 1971
- Recorded: July 26, 1971
- Venues: The Jazz'Inn, Paris, France
- Genre: Jazz
- Labels: Futura; GER 29
- Producer: Gérard Terrones

Jaki Byard chronology
Solo Piano (1969)	Live at the Jazz'Inn (1971)	Parisian Solos (1971)

Live at the Jazz'Inn is a live album by pianist Jaki Byard recorded in Paris in 1971 released on the French Futura label.

== Track listing ==
All compositions by Jaki Byard except as indicated

1. "Lady Bird" (Tadd Dameron) - 9:35
2. "Pescara to Genova to Paris" - 6:35
3. "Green-Just Blue" (Byard / Miles Davis) - 8:10
4. "Darryl" - 6:20
5. "Pagliacci" (Monticelli) - 3:05
6. "Gerald's Tune" - 3:30
7. "There Goes My Heart-San Francisco" (Traditional) - 6:00
8. "Garnerin' a Bit-Free Suite for Paris" '(Byard / Traditional) - 4:50

== Personnel ==
- Jaki Byard - piano, alto saxophone;
- Gus Nemeth - bass;
- Jean My Truong, Gerald Byard (track 6) - drums, vibraphone.
