= Keystone Korner =

Jazz club in San Francisco (1972–1983)

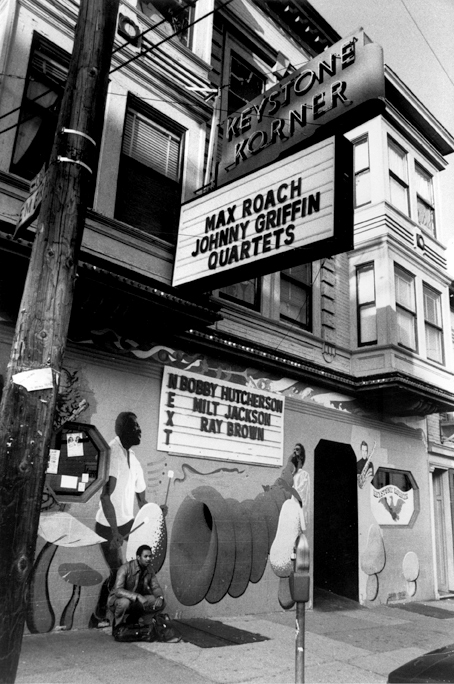
- Odean Pope in front of Keystone Korner, 1982
- Interactive map of Keystone Korner
- Location: 750 Vallejo Street; San Francisco, California; U.S.
- Coordinates: 37.798586°N 122.409374°W
- Owner: Todd Barkan
- Capacity: 200
- Type: Nightclub
- Event: Jazz

Construction
- Opened: 1972
- Closed: 1983

The Keystone Korner was a jazz club in the North Beach neighborhood of San Francisco, California, which opened in 1970 and continued operation until 1983. Many live recordings were made at the club. In the 1970s, Jessica Williams was the house pianist for a number of years.

== History ==
In 1969, Freddie Herrera bought Dino and Carlo's Bar in the North Beach section of San Francisco. He changed the name to Keystone Korner, a reference to Keystone Cops, because of its proximity to the Central Police Station on the opposite corner of Emery Lane. Keystone Korner began as a topless bar, but quickly changed direction when songwriter Nick Gravenites convinced Herrera that live music would bring in more customers. The strength of the music scene in San Francisco allowed Herrera to book young musicians who would go on to stellar careers. Patrons filled the club to hear new talents such as Saunders and Garcia, Elvin Bishop, Neal Schon, Boz Scaggs, and The Pointer Sisters. Herrera's success made it possible to move across the San Francisco Bay and open a larger room, called Keystone Berkeley. He then sold the Keystone Korner to Todd Barkan, who converted the nightclub from a popular rock venue to an internationally famous jazz club.

Barkan paid $12,500 (equivalent to $96,211 in 2025) for the Keystone Korner in 1972, and hired prominent jazz musicians to play there. Early gigs by performers including Sonny Rollins and Art Blakey established the Keystone as one of the best jazz clubs in the nation— a reputation that continued to build as musicians Miles Davis, McCoy Tyner, Bill Evans, Betty Carter, and Stan Getz appeared on its stage. Faced with economic challenges, Barkan was forced to close the Keystone Korner in 1983.

In 2019, Barkan and Michelin-starred chef Robert Wiedmaier re-launched the Keystone Korner in Baltimore's Harbor East. Bassist and bandleader Ron Carter and his trio with guitarist Russell Malone and pianist Donald Vega opened the club on April 30, 2019.

== Live recordings ==
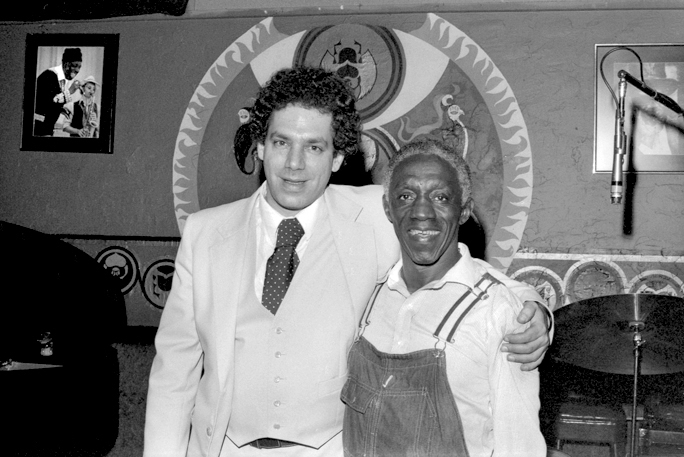
Todd Barkan, left, proprietor of Keystone Korner jazz club, San Francisco, and drummer and leader of the Jazz Messengers, Art Blakey, at Keystone Korner. December 27, 1979.

- Jerry Garcia and Merl Saunders, Garcia Live Volume 15 (1971)
- Rahsaan Roland Kirk, Bright Moments (1973)
- Yusef Lateef, 10 Years Hence (1974)
- McCoy Tyner, Atlantis (1974)
- Locomotiv GT, Azalbummm, (1974; hu:Azalbummm)
- Sonny Stitt, Work Done (1976)
- Red Garland, Keystones! (1977)
- Art Blakey, Heat Wave (M&I 1977)
- Art Pepper, San Francisco Samba (1977 [1997])
- Sam Rivers, Ricochet (NoBusiness, 1978 [2020])
- Art Blakey, In This Korner (1978)
- Red Garland, I Left My Heart... (1978 [1985])
- Jaki Byard, Sunshine of My Soul: Live at the Keystone Korner (1978, [2007])
- Jaki Byard, A Matter of Black and White (1978–79 [2011])
- Jaki Byard, The Late Show: An Evening with Jaki Byard (1979, [2014])
- Dexter Gordon, Keystone Nights (1978–1979) (Blue Note 1980, 1990 Mosaic 2004)
- Tete Montoliu, Live at the Keystone Corner (Timeless, 1979)
- George Cables, Morning Song (HighNote, 1980 [2008])
- Bill Evans, The Last Waltz: The Final Recordings (1980 [2000])
- Bill Evans, Consecration: The Final Recordings Part 2 (1980 [2002])
- Abbey Lincoln, Sophisticated Abbey: Live at the Keystone Korner (1980 [2015])
- Abbey Lincoln, Love Having You Around: Live at the Keystone Korner Vol. 2 (1980 [2016])
- Mark Murphy, Wild and Free: Live at the Keystone Korner (1980 [2017])
- Art Blakey, Straight Ahead (1981)
- Jimmy Smith and Eddie Harris, All the Way (1981)
- Denny Zeitlin and Charlie Haden, Time Remembers One Time Once (1981 [1983])
- Freddie Hubbard, Joe Henderson Bobby Hutcherson Keystone Bop: Sunday Night (1981), Keystone Bop Vol. 2: Friday & Saturday (1981)
- Pharoah Sanders, Heart is a Melody (1982)
- Nat Adderley, On the Move (1982)
- Nat Adderley, Blue Autumn (1982)
- Art Blakey and the Jazz Messengers, Keystone 3 (1982)
- Freddie Hubbard, Above & Beyond (1982 [1999])
- Tommy Flanagan and Jaki Byard, The Magic of 2 (1982 [2013])
- Timeless All Stars, It's Timeless (1982) - Cedar Walton, Bobby Hutcherson Harold Land Curtis Fuller
- Zoot Sims, On the Korner (1983)
- Paquito D'Rivera, Live at Keystone Korner (1983)
- Bobby Hutcherson, Farewell Keystone (1982 [1988])
- Cedar Walton, Among Friends (1982 [1989])
- Stan Getz, The Dolphin, Spring Is Here (1981), Moments in Time (1976 [2016])
- Stan Getz and João Gilberto, Getz/Gilberto '76 (1976 [2016])
- Mary Lou Williams, Live at the Keystone Korner (1977 [2002])
- Cedar Walton, Reliving the Moment (1977 [2014])
