= Night Leaves =

Studio album by Jaki Byard, David Eyges
- Released: 1997
- Recorded: January 4, 1997
- Genre: Jazz
- Label: Brownstone Recordings

Night Leaves is an album by pianist Jaki Byard and cellist David Eyges.

== Recording and music ==
Eyges plays his composition "Reflections" arco. "Gimme Some/Cinco Quatro Boogie Woogie" is played in 5/4 time.

== Reception ==
Professional ratings
Review scores
Source	Rating
AllMusic	4.5/5 stars

The JazzTimes reviewer concluded that "This recording proves once again that cello and piano can make for a most agreeable duo." The AllMusic reviewer stated that "There's a beautiful sense of harmonic understanding and freedom, a sense of timing beyond structured rhythms, and an empathy that these two retain simply by listening closely to one another."

== Track listing ==
1. "Night Leaves" – 1:29
2. "Gimme Some/Cinco Quatro Boogie Woogie" – 2:19
3. "The Chase" – 3:27
4. "Reflections" – 3:54
5. "Why It Is" – 5:05
6. "Waltz for Louise" – 4:09
7. "Epietis, Phaedrus, Terence, Metis" – 5:46
8. "Louise/One Note to My Wife" – 4:38
9. "Toni" – 4:10
10. "Broken Circle" – 3:14
11. "To Our Family" – 4:12

== Personnel ==
- Jaki Byard – piano
- David Eyges – electric cello
