= Parisian Solos =

Studio album by Jaki Byard
- Released: 1971
- Recorded: July 29, 1971; Paris, France
- Genre: Jazz
- Length: 48:02
- Label: Futura; SWING 05
- Producer: Gérard Terrones

Jaki Byard chronology
Live at the Jazz'Inn (1971)	Parisian Solos (1971)	Duet! (1972)

Parisian Solos is an album by American jazz pianist Jaki Byard (Note: credited on the original LP release as "Jaky Byard") consisting of several solo piano recordings. It was recorded in 1971 in Paris, France and was released on the Futura label.

== Reception ==
Professional ratings
Review scores
Source	Rating
AllMusic	4/5 stars

AllMusic awarded the album 4 stars, with its review by Ken Dryden stating: "This solo date in a Paris studio finds Jaki Byard in his usual jaunty mood at the piano, whether reviving a forgotten jazz tune like "Bugle Call Rag" (before it became a bluegrass standard), increasing the intensity of an often dull ballad "Besame Mucho," or revising "Willow Weep for Me" with the choppy approach that helped to make his sound so distinctive". (The AllMusic review is of the album's re-release edition, which features multiple bonus tracks.)

== Track listing ==
All compositions by Jaki Byard except as indicated.

1. "A Tribute to Jimmy Slide" - 3:37
2. "Love Is Here to Stay" (George Gershwin, Ira Gershwin) - 5:15
3. "Willow Weep for Me" (Ann Ronell) - 6:05
4. "Bugle Call Rag" (Billy Meyers, Jack Pettis, Elmer Schoebel) - 4:20
5. "When Lights Are Low" (Benny Carter) - 4:30
6. "Dedicated to Bob Vatel of Ten Gallons" - 3:10
7. "Isle to Isle" - 6:15
8. "Shiny Stockings" (Frank Foster) - 5:35
9. "Bésame Mucho" (Sunny Skylar, Consuelo Velázquez) - 4:15
10. "Going Home Blues" - 5:00

== Personnel ==
- Jaki Byard - piano
