= Herb Pomeroy =

American jazz trumpeter and teacher (1930–2007)

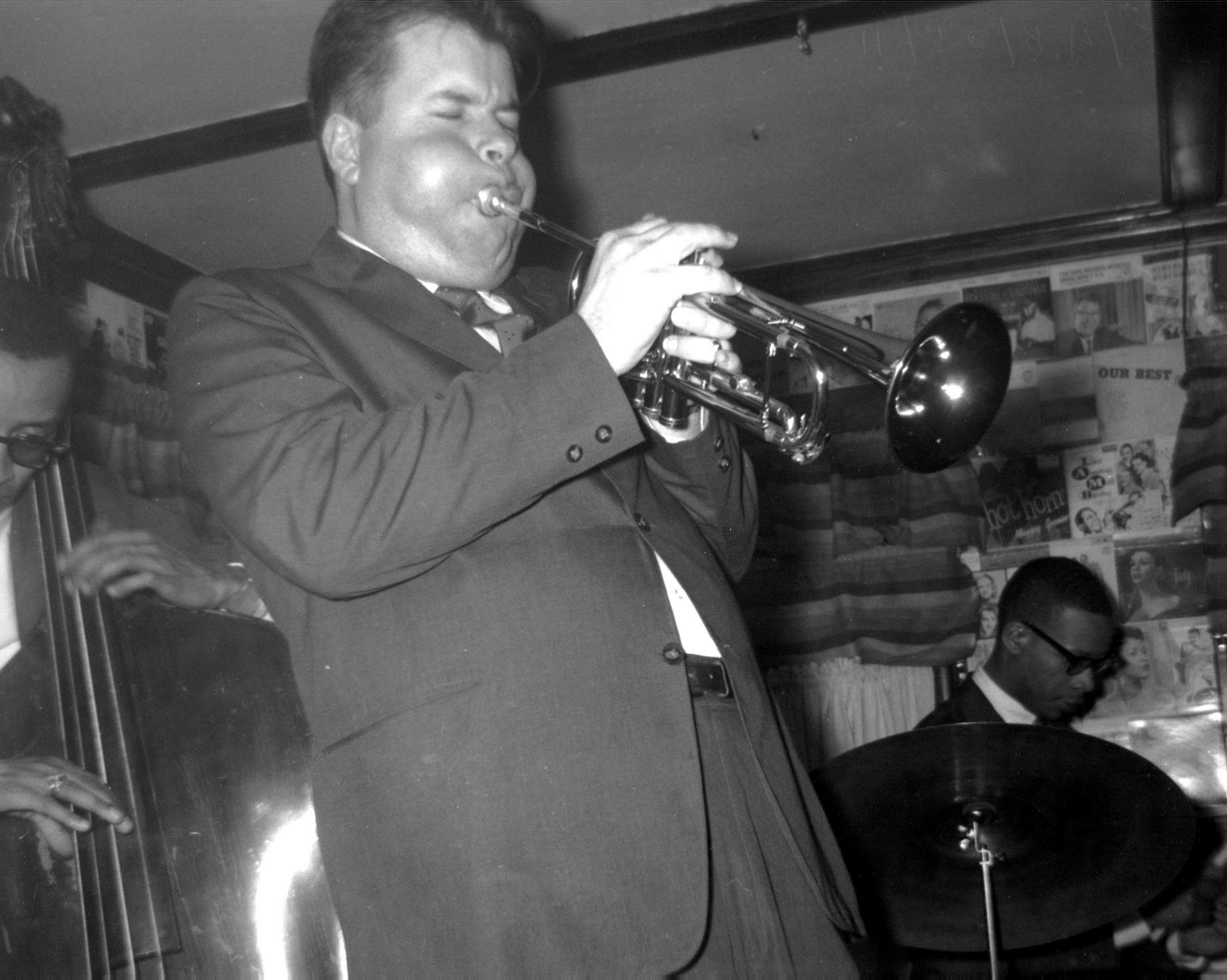
- Pomeroy playing at Lennie's on the Turnpike in 1963

Background information
- Born: Irving Herbert Pomeroy III; April 15, 1930; Gloucester, Massachusetts, U.S.
- Died: August 11, 2007 (aged 77) Gloucester, Massachusetts
- Genres: Jazz
- Occupations: Musician, educator
- Instruments: Trumpet, flugelhorn
- Formerly of: MIT Festival Jazz Ensemble

Irving Herbert Pomeroy III (April 15, 1930 – August 11, 2007) was an American jazz trumpeter, teacher, and the founder of the MIT Festival Jazz Ensemble.

== Early life ==
Pomeroy was born in Gloucester, Massachusetts, United States. He began playing trumpet at an early age. In his early teens he started performing in Boston, claiming inspiration from the music of Louis Armstrong. In 1946, at the age of 16, he became a member of the Musicians Union in Gloucester after the union did not have enough members to conduct a meeting. He studied dentistry at Harvard University for a year but dropped out to pursue his jazz career.

After high school, he studied music from 1950 to 1952 at the Schillinger House in Boston.

== Career ==
Remaining in Boston, he played with Charlie Parker for one week in 1953, then briefly with Charlie Mariano, before going on tour with Lionel Hampton and Stan Kenton. Back in Boston, he played with Serge Chaloff and was hired to teach at Schillinger after it had been renamed the Berklee School of Music. During the latter part of the 1950s he was the leader of a sixteen-piece band which included Mariano, Bill Berry, Jaki Byard, Joe Gordon, and Boots Mussulli. For two years after that, he led another band, which included Alan Dawson, Hal Galper, Michael Gibbs, Dusko Goykovich, and Sam Rivers. He worked in pit orchestras for Broadway shows passing through Boston. Beginning in 1963 he led bands at the Massachusetts Institute of Technology. He led a band until 1993, two years before retiring from Berklee.

He helped establish the Jazz Workshop on Stuart Street under the leadership of Mariano and including Chaloff, Varty Haroutunian, Ray Santisi, and Dick Twardzik on the faculty. In 1963 he was hired to revitalize the Techtonians big band at MIT. It was renamed the Festival Jazz Ensemble, and he continued as its director for 22 years. He led the band throughout the US and abroad, taking it to the Montreux Jazz Festival in Switzerland. On May 10, 2008, the university had a memorial concert for him. He taught at the Lenox School of Music where he conducted a full orchestra of his students. After retirement, he did workshops for local students through the Gloucester Education Foundation.

Although Pomeroy is remembered as a music educator, his first love was performing as a trumpeter.

== Awards and honors ==
- Hall of Fame, International Association of Jazz Educators, 1996
- Jazz Education Hall of Fame, Down Beat magazine
- Honorary degree, Berklee, 1995
- Musician of the Year, Boston Musician's Association, 2004

== Former students ==
Former students include Lee Allen (piano), Franck Amsallem, Toshiko Akiyoshi, Michel Barbaud, Alan Broadbent, Gary Burton, Janez Gregorc, Duško Gojković, Mika Pohjola, Mark Levine (author, trombone, piano), Gary McFarland, Jože Privšek, Miroslav Vitouš, Ranko Rihtman, Dennis Wilson (trombone), and Mickey Yoshino.

== Discography ==
=== As leader ===
- Jazz in a Stable (Transition, 1955)
- Life Is a Many Splendored Gig (Roulette, 1957)
- Band in Boston (United Artists, 1958)
- The Band and I with Irene Kral (United Artists, 1958)
- Pramlatta's Hips (Shiah, 1980)
- This Is Always (Daring, 1996)
- Walking on Air (Arbors, 1997)

=== As sideman ===
With John Lewis

- The Wonderful World of Jazz (Atlantic, 1960)
- Essence (Atlantic, 1962)

With Charlie Mariano

- Charlie Mariano with His Jazz Group (Imperial, 1950)
- Modern Saxophone Stylings of Charlie Mariano (Imperial, 1951)

With Gary McFarland

- The Jazz Version of "How to Succeed in Business without Really Trying" (Verve, 1962)

With Anita O'Day

- All the Sad Young Men (Verve, 1962)

== See also ==
- Pomeroy scale
