= Sunshine of My Soul: Live at the Keystone Korner =

Live album by Jaki Byard
- Released: February 20, 2007
- Recorded: June 1978
- Venue: Keystone Korner, San Francisco, CA
- Genre: Jazz
- Length: 59:51
- Label: HighNote; HCD 7169
- Producer: Joe Fields

Jaki Byard chronology
The Changes of Life (2004)	Sunshine of My Soul: Live at the Keystone Korner (2007)	A Matter of Black and White (2011)

Sunshine of My Soul: Live at the Keystone Korner is an album of a live solo performance by American jazz pianist Jaki Byard recorded in 1978 and released as a CD on the HighNote label in 2007.

== Reception ==
Professional ratings
Review scores
Source	Rating
AllMusic	3.5/5 stars
The Penguin Guide to Jazz	3.5/4 stars

AllMusic reviewer Thom Jurek states, "Byard was a true giant of jazz and this set, in excellent sound, displays all of the reasons". All About Jazz's George Kanzler noted "Byard was at his uninhibited best as a solo pianist and this CD unearths a sterling solo set recorded in 1978 at a San Francisco jazz club".

== Track listing ==
All compositions by Jaki Byard except as indicated

1. "Tribute to the Ticklers" - 3:46
2. "Charles Mingus Medley: Fables of Faubus/Peggy's Blue Skylight/So Long Eric" (Charles Mingus) ["So Long Eric" is not listed] - 6:27
3. "Hazy Eve" - 6:43
4. "Spinning Wheel" (David Clayton-Thomas) - 4:15
5. "Excerpts from Songs of Proverbs" - 6:44
6. "Boogie Woogie In and Out" - 3:59
7. "Emil" - 4:27
8. "Bésame Mucho" (Consuelo Velázquez) - 8:37
9. "Sunshine" - 5:15
10. "Two Different Worlds" (Al Frisch, Sid Wayne) - 5:05
11. "European Episodes" - 4:33

== Personnel ==
- Jaki Byard – piano
