= Freedom Together! =

Studio album by Jaki Byard
- Released: 1966
- Recorded: January 11, 1966
- Studio: RLA Sound, NYC
- Genre: Jazz
- Length: 39:31
- Label: Prestige; PR 7463
- Producer: Don Schlitten

Jaki Byard chronology
The Last from Lennie's (1965)	Freedom Together! (1966)	On the Spot! (1967)

Freedom Together! is an album by pianist Jaki Byard recorded in 1966 and released on the Prestige label.

== Reception ==
Professional ratings
Review scores
Source	Rating
Allmusic	4/5 stars
Down Beat	4/5 stars
The Rolling Stone Jazz Record Guide	3/5 stars
The Penguin Guide to Jazz Recordings	3/4 stars

In a contemporary review, Down Beat gave the album 4 stars, and commented on the balance between freedom and structure in the performances: "The title track is a most eloquent refutation of the avant-garde illiterates, while being an object lesson in how to attain the highest form of personal musical freedom." Allmusic awarded the album 4 stars, with the review by Scott Yanow stating, "This is a particularly unusual and colorful set, for Byard not only plays piano, but makes appearances on celeste, electric piano, vibes, drums and tenor sax... Byard is in excellent form".

== Track listing ==
All compositions by Jaki Byard except as noted

1. "Freedom Together" – 11:29
2. "Getting to Know You" (Oscar Hammerstein II, Richard Rodgers) – 4:54
3. "Ode to Prez" – 3:21
4. "Nocturne for Contrabass" – 6:00
5. "Just You, Just Me" (Jesse Greer, Raymond Klages) – 5:18
6. "Night Leaves" – 6:22
7. "Young at Heart" (Carolyn Leigh, Johnny Richards) – 2:07

== Personnel ==
- Jaki Byard – piano, electric piano, celeste, vibraphone, tenor saxophone, drums
- Richard Davis – bass, cello
- Alan Dawson – drums, vibraphone, timpani
- Junior Parker – vocals (tracks 2 & 6)
