= To Them – To Us =

To Them - To Us

Studio album by Jaki Byard
- Released: 1982
- Recorded: May 27, 1981
- Genre: Jazz
- Length: 43:56
- Label: Soul Note
- Producer: Giovanni Bonandrini

Jaki Byard chronology
Improvisations (1981)	To Them - To Us (1982)	Phantasies (1984)

To Them – To Us is an album of solo piano performances by the American jazz pianist Jaki Byard recorded in 1981 and released on the Italian Soul Note label.

== Reception ==
The Allmusic review by Ken Dryden awarded the album 4 stars stating "Jaki Byard was captured alone in a Milan studio for this delightful session. As usual, he displays his formidable technique with an ever-present twinkle of humor. Everything from early jazz to classic renditions of Ellington masterpieces... Several strong Byard originals round out this highly recommended CD".

Professional ratings
Review scores
Source	Rating
Allmusic	4/5 stars
The Penguin Guide to Jazz Recordings	3.5/4 stars
The Rolling Stone Jazz Record Guide	4/5 stars

== Track listing ==
All compositions by Jaki Byard except as indicated

1. "To Them - To Us" - 11:23
2. "BL + WH = 88" - 3:04
3. "Tin Roof Blues" (George Brunies, Paul Mares, Ben Pollack, Leon Roppolo, Mel Stitzel) - 3:40
4. "Land of Make Believe" (Chuck Mangione) - 3:32
5. "Solitude" (Eddie DeLange, Duke Ellington, Irving Mills) - 4:30
6. "Caravan" (Juan Tizol) - 3:24
7. "Ode to Billie Joe" (Bobbi Gentry) - 5:30
8. "Send One Your Love" (Stevie Wonder) - 4:17
9. "Excerpts from Trumpet Concerto: Calm of the Sea/Approaching Winds/Calm" - 4:36

- Recorded at Barigozzi Studio in Milano, Italy on May 27, 1981

== Personnel ==
- Jaki Byard – piano
