= There'll Be Some Changes Made (album) =

Studio album by Jaki Byard
- Released: 1973
- Recorded: 1972
- Genre: Jazz
- Labels: Muse; MR 5007

Jaki Byard chronology
Duet! (1972)	There'll Be Some Changes Made (1973)	Family Man (1972)

Professional ratings
Review scores
Source	Rating
AllMusic	4/5 stars
The Penguin Guide to Jazz	3/4 stars
The Rolling Stone Jazz Record Guide	5/5 stars

There'll Be Some Changes Made (also released as Empirical) is an album by pianist Jaki Byard recorded in 1972 and released on the Muse label.

== Reception ==
AllMusic awarded the album 4 stars with a review stating, "This is one of his best all-round albums".

== Track listing ==
All compositions by Jaki Byard except as indicated

1. "There'll Be Some Changes Made" (Benton Overstreet, Billy Higgins) - 3:57
2. "Lonely Town" (Leonard Bernstein) - 5:29
3. "Blues au Gratin" - 3:29
4. "Excerpts From Songs of Proverbs / Toni" - 5:17
5. "Bésame Mucho" (Sunny Skylar, Consuelo Velázquez) - 4:54
6. "Spanish Tinge #3" - 2:26
7. "Journey / Night of Departure" - 6:49
8. "To Bob Vatel of Paris / Blues for Jennie" - 5:41
9. "Some Other Spring / Every Year" - 5:54
10. "Tribute to Jimmy Slide" - 4:51

== Personnel ==
- Jaki Byard - piano
