= Apollo Stompers =

Jazz big band

The Apollo Stompers was a jazz big band led by Jaki Byard.

Accounts vary on when the Apollo Stompers was formed. These range from the 1950s to the mid-1970s.

For a time, two versions of the band existed: one of New York musicians, and the other of students from the New England Conservatory of Music, where Byard taught. He commented that he was "running up and down the road between Boston and New York and I said why not get a band together in New York, too?"

For one concert, Byard used the two ensembles together, on either side of a stage at the New England Conservatory. He referred to it as his "Stereophonic Ensemble", because of the effects that could be created by having the bands playing together but separated spatially.

The band played a diverse range of material, including compositions by Stevie Wonder in 1978, Eubie Blake, Fats Waller, Duke Ellington, and Charles Mingus. Vocalists and tap dancers were also sometimes featured. Central, however, where Byard's own compositions; he also wrote all of the band's arrangements.

== Discography ==
As "Jaki Byard and the Apollo Stompers":

- Phantasies (Soul Note, 1984)
- Phantasies II (Soul Note, 1988)
- My Mother's Eyes (1998)
