= The Jaki Byard Experience =

Studio album by Jaki Byard
- Released: 1969
- Recorded: September 17, 1968
- Genre: Jazz
- Length: 35:55
- Label: Prestige
- Producer: Don Schlitten

Jaki Byard chronology
Jaki Byard with Strings! (1968)	The Jaki Byard Experience (1969)	Solo Piano (1969)

Professional ratings
Review scores
Source	Rating
Allmusic	5/5 stars
The Rolling Stone Jazz Record Guide	4/5 stars
The Penguin Guide to Jazz Recordings	3.5/4 stars

The Jaki Byard Experience is an album by jazz pianist Jaki Byard, originally released on the Prestige label in 1968, featuring performances by Byard with Roland Kirk, Richard Davis and Alan Dawson.

== Reception ==
The Allmusic review by Scott Yanow awarded the album five out of five stars and states: "Pianist Jaki Byard and the wondrous Roland Kirk (here switching between tenor, clarinet, and manzello) were two of the few jazz musicians who could play in literally every jazz style, from New Orleans to bop and free form. If only they had recorded a history-of-jazz album. Fortunately, they did meet up on a few occasions, including this brilliant quartet session".

== Track listing ==
1. "Parisian Thoroughfare" (Bud Powell) – 10:05
2. "Hazy Eve" (Jaki Byard) – 4:34
3. "Shine on Me" (Traditional) – 4:16
4. "Evidence" (Thelonious Monk) – 4:24
5. "Memories of You" (Eubie Blake, Andy Razaf) – 7:13
6. "Teach Me Tonight" (Sammy Cahn, Gene DePaul) – 5:23

- Recorded in New York on September 17, 1968

== Personnel ==
- Jaki Byard: piano
- Roland Kirk: tenor saxophone, manzello, clarinet, whistle, kirkbam
- Richard Davis: bass
- Alan Dawson: drums
