= Jaki Byard with Strings! =

Studio album by Jaki Byard
- Released: 1968
- Recorded: April 2, 1968; New York City
- Genre: Jazz
- Label: Prestige; PR 7573
- Producer: Don Schlitten

Jaki Byard chronology
Sunshine of My Soul (1967)	Jaki Byard with Strings! (1968)	The Jaki Byard Experience (1968)

Jaki Byard with Strings! is an album by pianist Jaki Byard recorded in 1968 and released on the Prestige label. It is a sextet recording, with George Benson (guitar), Ray Nance (violin and vocals), Ron Carter (cello), Richard Davis (double bass), and Alan Dawson (drums and vibraphone).

== Music ==
Critic Gary Giddins commented that, "a few complicated arrangements notwithstanding, this album is mostly an upbeat jam". One of the complicated arrangements was "Cat's Cradle Conference Rag" – each of five musicians "play five standards based on similar harmonies simultaneously". With the drummer added, these were: "Take the A Train" (Byard); "Jersey Bounce" (Nance); "Darktown Strutters' Ball" (Benson); "Intermission Riff" (Davis); "Desafinado" (Carter); and "Ring Dem Bells" (Dawson).

== Reception ==
Professional ratings
Review scores
Source	Rating
Allmusic	4/5 stars
The Rolling Stone Jazz Record Guide	2/5 stars

Allmusic awarded the album 4 stars with its review by Scott Yanow, stating, "The repertoire includes a jammed version of "How High the Moon," a couple of tricky Byard originals and the then-current pop tune "Music to Watch Girls By." But more significant than the songs is the playing by the distinctive musicians who almost make the band sound like a regular group rather than a one-time get-together". Giddins was also positive; he picked out Ray Nance's solo on "How High the Moon": it "ranks with the one he recorded on Dizzy Gillespie's "Lover Come Back to Me" as the best work of his later years".

== Track listing ==
All compositions by Jaki Byard except as indicated

1. "Music to Watch Girls By" (Sid Ramin) – 3:44
2. "Falling Rains of Life" – 7:56
3. "Cat's Cradle Conference Rag" – 11:47
4. "How High the Moon" (Nancy Hamilton, Morgan Lewis) – 14:17
5. "Ray's Blues" – 6:47

== Personnel ==
- Jaki Byard – piano, organ
- George Benson – guitar
- Ray Nance – violin, vocals
- Ron Carter – cello
- Richard Davis – bass
- Alan Dawson – drums, vibraphone
