= The Entertainer (Jaki Byard album) =

Studio album by Jaki Byard
- Released: 1972
- Recorded: July 31, 1972
- Studio: Victor Studio, Tokyo
- Genre: Jazz
- Label: Victor

Professional ratings
Review scores
Source	Rating
Allmusic	4.5/5 stars

The Entertainer is a 1972 solo album by jazz pianist Jaki Byard.

== Recording and music ==
The album was recorded for the Japanese label Victor. The material is diverse: "ragtime, to classic jazz, standards, and pop fluff of the 1970s, along with the pianist's creative originals".

== Releases ==
It was released by Victor. The LP was also released by Storyville.

== Track listing ==
1. "My Man's Gone Now"
2. "Chicago Breakdown"
3. "Tony"
4. "(They Long to Be) Close to You"
5. "Blues for Smokes Brother"
6. "The Entertainer"
7. "Django"
8. "Something's Gotta Give"

== Personnel ==
- Jaki Byard – piano
