= Foolin' Myself =

Studio album by Jaki Byard Trio
- Released: 1989
- Recorded: August 25, 1988
- Genre: Jazz
- Length: 43:56
- Label: Soul Note
- Producer: Giovanni Bonandrini

Jaki Byard chronology
Phantasies II (1988)	Foolin' Myself (1989)	Jaki Byard at Maybeck (1991)

Foolin' Myself is an album of trio performances by the American jazz pianist Jaki Byard recorded in 1988 and released on the Italian Soul Note label.

== Reception ==
The Allmusic review by Ken Dryden awarded the album 2 1/2 stars, stating "While the pianist's technique is impressive as always, his songs are not as strong as on many of his other releases".

Professional ratings
Review scores
Source	Rating
AllMusic	2.5/5 stars
The Penguin Guide to Jazz	3/4 stars

== Track listing ==
All compositions by Jaki Byard except as indicated

1. "Suite 27: Waterfalls, Highways, Skyways, Waterways" - 5:11
2. "Oslo to Kristiansund to Malmo" - 3:10
3. "Searchlight No. 2" - 9:22
4. "Stage I / Stage II" - 4:17
5. "Breath" (Ralph Hamperian) - 8:27
6. "Foolin' Myself" (Jack Lawrence, Peter Tinturin) - 3:50
7. "Land of Love" - 6:36
- Recorded at Sound Ideas Studios in New York City on August 25, 1988

== Personnel ==
- Jaki Byard]] – piano
- Ralph Hamperian - bass
- Richard Allen - drums
