= Waltzin' with Flo =

Waltzin' With Flo

Studio album by Alan Dawson
- Released: September 13, 2002
- Recorded: 1992
- Genre: jazz

Waltzin' with Flo is the only solo album by jazz drummer Alan Dawson. Although it was recorded in 1992, it wasn't released until 2002, six years after his death in 1996 from leukemia. Ken Dryden of Rovi says (in a review), "Not only is Dawson's matchless drumming a key component of this CD, but he also records several of his compositions and arrangements, and he also plays vibes on two tracks".

== Track listing ==
1. Penta Blues
2. Airegin
3. Two Stepped
4. Waltz for Flo
5. 1993 A.D.
6. Little Man You've Had a Busy Day
7. Havana Days
8. Old Devil Moon
9. Joshua

== Personnel ==
- Alan Dawson: drums, vibraphone
- Tony Reedus: drums
- Ray Drummond: bass
- James Williams or Donald Brown: piano
- Bill Mobley: trumpet, flugelhorn
- Bill Pierce: tenor saxophone
- Andy McGhee: tenor saxophone
