= Blues for Smoke =

Studio album by Jaki Byard
- Released: 1988 (US)
- Recorded: December 16, 1960
- Studio: Nola Penthouse Studios, New York City
- Genre: Jazz
- Length: 38:50
- Label: Candid; CJS 9018
- Producer: Alan Bates

Jaki Byard chronology
Blues for Smoke (1988)	Here's Jaki (1961)

Blues for Smoke is an album by pianist Jaki Byard recorded in 1960 and released on the Candid label.

== Reception ==
Professional ratings
Review scores
Source	Rating
Allmusic	4.5/5 stars
The Penguin Guide to Jazz	3.5/4 stars

Allmusic awarded the album 4½ stars with its review by Scott Yanow stating, "A highly recommended outing from a very underrated pianist".

== Track listing ==
All compositions by Jaki Byard

1. "Journey/Hollis Stomp/Milan to Lyon" - 5:57
2. "Aluminum Baby" - 4:32
3. "Pete and Thomas (Tribute to the Ticklers)" - 3:41
4. "Spanish Tinge No 1" - 4:12
5. "Flight of the Fly" - 5:44
6. "Blues for Smoke" - 4:52
7. "Jaki's Blues Next" - 2:07
8. "Diane's Melody" - 5:05
9. "One Two Five" - 2:40

== Personnel ==
- Jaki Byard - piano
