= The Changes of Life =

Studio album by Jaki Byard
- Released: 2001
- Recorded: January 30–31, 1996
- Genre: Jazz
- Label: Meldac

Professional ratings
Review scores
Source	Rating
AllMusic	4/5 stars
The Penguin Guide to Jazz	3/4 stars

The Changes of Life is an album by pianist Jaki Byard, with bassist Ralph Hamperian, and drummer Richard Allen.

== Recording and music ==
The album was recorded in January 1996. Most of the tracks are ballads. Byard's "Family Suite" composition was previously recorded for the album Family Man.

== Release ==
The Japanese label Meldac released the album on CD.

== Track listing ==
1. "September Song" – 5:15
2. "Solitude" – 5:14
3. "The Changes of Life" – 4:09
4. "All Alone" – 7:30
5. "Mandella" – 1:40
6. "Giant Steps" – 4:02
7. "Left Alone" – 5:01
8. "Family Suite" – 13:26
9. "Stardust" – 5:56

== Personnel ==
- Jaki Byard – piano
- Ralph Hamperian – bass
- Richard Allen – drums
