= The Magic of 2 =

Live album by Tommy Flanagan, Jaki Byard
- Released: April 9, 2013
- Recorded: February 7, 1982
- Venue: Keystone Korner, San Francisco
- Genre: Jazz
- Label: Resonance
- Producer: Todd Barkan, Zev Feldman

Tommy Flanagan chronology
Giant Steps (1982)	The Magic of 2 (2013)	Thelonica (1982)

Professional ratings
Review scores
Source	Rating
DownBeat	4/5 stars

The Magic of 2 is an album by jazz pianists Tommy Flanagan and Jaki Byard. It was recorded in 1982 and released by Resonance Records in 2013.

== Recording and music ==
The album was recorded at Keystone Korner, San Francisco, in 1982. The pair play together on five of the tracks ("Scrapple from the Apple", "Just One of Those Things", "Satin Doll", "Our Delight", and "The Theme"), and each has three solo performances.

== Releases ==
It was released by Resonance Records on April 9, 2013. CD, limited edition LP, and digital download versions were available. The producers were Todd Barkan and Zev Feldman.

== Track listing ==
1. Introduction by Todd Barkan
2. "Scrapple from the Apple"
3. "Just One of Those Things"
4. "Satin Doll"
5. "Something to Live For"
6. "Send One Your Love"
7. "Our Delight"
8. "All Day Long"
9. "Sunday"
10. "Chelsea Bridge"
11. "Land of Make Believe"
12. "The Theme"

== Personnel ==
- Tommy Flanagan – piano
- Jaki Byard – piano
