= The Last from Lennie's =

Live album by Jaki Byard Quartet with Joe Farrell
- Released: 2003
- Recorded: April 15, 1965
- Venue: Lennie's On The Turnpike in West Peabody, Massachusetts
- Genre: Jazz
- Length: 62:29
- Label: Prestige; PR 11029
- Producer: Don Schlitten

Jaki Byard chronology
| Jaki Byard Quartet Live! (1965) | The Last from Lennie's (2003) | Freedom Together! (1966) |

The Last from Lennie's is an album by pianist Jaki Byard's Quartet recorded in 1965 at the same performances that produced Jaki Byard Quartet Live! and (apart from one track which was released in the 1960s) first released on the Prestige label in 2003.

== Reception ==
Professional ratings
Review scores
| Source | Rating |
|---|---|
| Allmusic | 4/5 stars |
| The Penguin Guide to Jazz Recordings | 3/4 stars |

Allmusic awarded the album 4 stars with its review by Ronnie D. Lankford Jr. stating, "the quartet recordings on Last From Lennie's are bursting with creative energy... Like all good vault releases, Last From Lennie's reminds listeners of just how good Byard and his bandmates were". A review on the All About Jazz website stated "The pace never slows over the album's 62 minute length. At the conclusion of "King David," I'm exhausted!"

== Track listing ==
All compositions by Jaki Byard except as indicated

1. "Twelve" - 10:12
2. "Dolphy #1" - 9:05
3. "After You've Gone / Strolling Along" (Henry Creamer, Turner Layton / Byard) - 4:21
4. "St. Mark's Place Among the Sewers" - 14:42
5. "Dolphy #2" - 10:41
6. "Jaki Byard's Ballad Medley: Tea for Two / Lover / Strolling Along / Cherokee" (Vincent Youmans, Irving Caesar / Richard Rodgers, Lorenz Hart / Byard / Ray Noble) - 9:45 Originally released on Jaki Byard Quartet Live! Vol. 2
7. "King David" - 3:43

== Personnel ==
- Jaki Byard - piano
- Joe Farrell - tenor saxophone, soprano saxophone, flute, drums
- George Tucker - bass
- Alan Dawson - drums, vibraphone
