= Involution (album) =

Studio album by Michael Marcus
- Released: March 30, 1998
- Recorded: 1998
- Genre: Jazz
- Label: Justin Time

Professional ratings
Review scores
Source	Rating
AllMusic	3/5 stars
The Penguin Guide to Jazz Recordings	3/4 stars

Involution is an album by multi-instrumentalist Michael Marcus, with the Jaki Byard trio.

== Background ==
This was Marcus's third album for Justin Time Records.

== Recording and music ==
The album was recorded in 1998. The tracks are a mix of Marcus originals and standards that are played relatively infrequently. Marcus plays a variety of saxophones: the stritch (a form of soprano), saxello (a straight alto), and a straight tenor.

== Release ==
The album was released by Justin Time on March 30, 1998.

== Reception ==
The AllMusic reviewer commented that this album was more conventional in style than many of Marcus's other recordings.

== Track listing ==
1. "Israel" (John Carisi) – 5:46
2. "Quadrophonics" (Michael Marcus) – 7:43
3. "The Legend of Hale-Bopp" (Marcus) – 6:09
4. "Soultrane" (Tadd Dameron) – 7:47
5. "Man from Lovejoy" (Marcus) – 4:19
6. "Off Minor" (Thelonious Monk) – 4:55
7. "Sacred Law" (Marcus) – 4:33
8. "Dear Lord" (John Coltrane) – 4:40
9. "Surfer Girl" (Brian Wilson) – 2:30
10. "Involution" (Marcus) – 4:34

== Personnel ==
- Michael Marcus – straight tenor sax, saxello, stritch
- Jaki Byard – piano
- Ralph Hamperian – bass
- Richard Allen – drums
