= A Matter of Black and White =

Live album by Jaki Byard
- Released: March 22, 2011
- Recorded: 1978 – 1979
- Venue: Keystone Korner, San Francisco
- Genre: Jazz
- Length: 55:51
- Label: HighNote; HCD 7219
- Producer: Joe Fields

Jaki Byard chronology
Sunshine of My Soul: Live at the Keystone Korner (2007)	A Matter of Black and White (2011)	The Late Show: An Evening with Jaki Byard (2014)

A Matter of Black and White is a live album of solo performances by American jazz pianist Jaki Byard recorded in 1978 and 1979 and released on the HighNote label.

== Reception ==
Professional ratings
Review scores
Source	Rating
AllMusic	4/5 stars
All About Jazz	3.5/5 stars

AllMusic reviewer Ken Dryden states, "Jaki Byard was a one-of-a-kind, a jazz musician who was immersed in the history of jazz and could easily intermingle contrasting styles, not only in the midst of a performance, but an individual tune". Writing for All About Jazz, Charles Walker stated "Byard delivers a hodgepodge selection of standards and tributes, with the occasional original thrown in for good measure. But the meat of the program lies in the way he incorporates wildly disparate styles into their unfolding, all the while retaining an identifiably personal voice... a fine place to sample some of what makes him such a unique talent". JazzTimes Thomas Conrad observed "any set of solo Byard is invaluable. His language, at once modern and archaic, blended stride and ragtime and abstraction and impish wit. When he played unaccompanied his imagination was set free".

== Track listing ==
1. "Seasons" (Jaki Byard) - 5:12
2. "Billie Holiday Tribute: God Bless the Child/Lover Man" (Billie Holiday, Arthur Herzog, Jr./Jimmy Davis, James Sherman, Ram Ramirez) - 6:57
3. "Alexander's Ragtime Band" (Irving Berlin) - 4:21
4. "Hello, Young Lovers" (Richard Rodgers, Oscar Hammerstein II) - 5:02
5. "Do You Know What It Means to Miss New Orleans?" (Eddie DeLange, Louis Alter) - 7:01
6. "I Know a Place" (Tony Hatch) - 3:37
7. "'Round Midnight" (Thelonious Monk) - 6:41
8. "Sunday" (Ned Miller) - 6:03
9. "Ellington-Strayhorn Medley: Lush Life/Day Dream/Johnny Come Lately" (Billy Strayhorn/Strayhorn, Duke Ellington, John La Touche/Strayhorn) - 10:57

== Personnel ==
- Jaki Byard – piano
