= Solo Piano (Jaki Byard album) =

Studio album by Jaki Byard
- Released: 1969
- Recorded: July 31, 1969; New York City
- Genre: Jazz
- Label: Prestige; PR 7686
- Producer: Don Schlitten

Jaki Byard chronology
The Jaki Byard Experience (1968)	Solo Piano (1969)	Live at the Jazz'Inn (1971)

Solo Piano is an album by pianist Jaki Byard recorded in 1969 and released on the Prestige label.

== Reception ==
Professional ratings
Review scores
Source	Rating
Allmusic	4/5 stars
The Rolling Stone Jazz Record Guide	5/5 stars

Allmusic awarded the album 4 stars with its review by Ken Dryden stating, "Jaki Byard is always an enjoyable pianist in any group, but he is at his best as a soloist. His second solo outing has a good deal of New Orleans influences".

== Track listing ==
All compositions by Jaki Byard except as indicated

1. "New Orleans Strut" - 5:56
2. "Spanish Tinge No. 2" - 5:26
3. "Top of the Gate Rag" - 3:08
4. "A Basin Street Ballad" - 4:04
5. "The Hollis Stomp" - 2:27
6. "Hello, Young Lovers" (Oscar Hammerstein II, Richard Rodgers) - 4:45
7. "Seasons" - 3:46
8. "Medley: I Know a Place / Let the Good Times Roll" (Tony Hatch / Shirley Goodman, Leonard Lee) - 3:33
9. "Do You Know What It Means to Miss New Orleans?" (Louis Alter, Eddie DeLange) - 4:59

== Personnel ==
- Jaki Byard - piano
