= Improvisations (Ran Blake & Jaki Byard album) =

Studio album by Ran Blake & Jaki Byard
- Released: 1982
- Recorded: May 25–26, 1981
- Genre: Jazz
- Length: 44:38
- Label: Soul Note
- Producer: Giovanni Bonandrini

Jaki Byard chronology
Family Man (1978)	Improvisations (1982)	To Them – To Us (1981)

Ran Blake chronology
Film Noir (1980)	Improvisations (1981)	Duke Dreams (1981)

Improvisations is an album of piano duets by the American jazz pianists Ran Blake and Jaki Byard, recorded in 1981 and released on the Italian Soul Note label.

== Reception ==
The AllMusic review by Scott Yanow stated: "Because Byard (who can play credibly in virtually every jazz style) is highly flexible, he was able to meet Blake on his own terms and inspire him to play more extrovertedly than usual... In other words, this matchup works".

Professional ratings
Review scores
Source	Rating
AllMusic	3/5 stars
The Penguin Guide to Jazz Recordings	3/4 stars

== Track listing ==
All compositions by Ran Blake & Jaki Byard except as indicated

1. "On Green Dolphin Street" (Bronislau Kaper, Ned Washington) – 6:06
2. "Prelude" – 4:09
3. "Chromatics" – 8:28
4. "Wende" (Ran Blake) – 3:42
5. "Tea for Two" (Irving Caesar, Vincent Youmans) – 6:57
6. "Victoria" (Greg Silberman) – 4:41
7. "Sonata for Two Pianos" – 10:35

- Recorded at Barigozzi Studio in Milano, Italy on May 25 & 26, 1981

== Personnel ==
- Jaki Byard – piano
- Ran Blake – piano
