= The Late Show: An Evening with Jaki Byard =

Live album by Jaki Byard
- Released: June 17, 2014
- Recorded: August 9–12, 1979
- Venue: Keystone Korner, San Francisco, CA
- Genre: Jazz
- Length: 64:47
- Label: HighNote; HCD 7264
- Producer: Joe Fields

Jaki Byard chronology
A Matter of Black and White (2011)	The Late Show: An Evening with Jaki Byard (2014)

The Late Show: An Evening with Jaki Byard is a solo performance by American jazz pianist Jaki Byard recorded in 1979 and released as a live album on the HighNote label in 2014.

== Reception ==
Professional ratings
Review scores
Source	Rating
AllMusic	3.5/5 stars

AllMusic reviewer Steve Leggett states, "Byard was a jazz player by trade, but his real allegiance was to the piano itself, and few players have brought so much variety out of the instrument and still made it seem like it was all cut from the same elegant and comfortable cloth. All of that is on display here".

== Track listing ==
All compositions by Jaki Byard except as indicated

1. Opening Remarks by Todd Barkan and Jaki Byard - 0:59
2. "Hello Young Lovers" (Oscar Hammerstein II, Richard Rodgers) - 6:14
3. "In Your Own Sweet Way" (Dave Brubeck) - 5:11
4. Introductory Remarks - 1:14
5. "Family Suite" - 8:41
6. "Spanish Tinge No. 1" - 6:32
7. Introductory Remarks - 0:28
8. "Strayhorn-Ellington Medley: Day Dream/Caravan" (Duke Ellington, Billy Strayhorn/Juan Tizol) - 8:57
9. Introductory Remarks - 0:51
10. "European Episode" - 4:50
11. "Medley: All the Things You Are/I'll Remember April" (Oscar Hammerstein II, Jerome Kern/Gene de Paul, Patricia Johnston, Don Raye) - 7:33
12. Introductory Remarks - 0:28
13. "GEB Piano Roll" - 4:31
14. "Sweet Georgia Brown" (Ben Bernie, Kenneth Casey, Maceo Pinkard) - 4:31
15. Introductory Remarks - 0:39
16. "For All We Know" (J. Fred Coots, Sam M. Lewis) - 3:08

== Personnel ==
- Jaki Byard – piano
