= Life Is a Many Splendored Gig =

Studio album by Herb Pomeroy
- Released: 1957 or early 1958
- Recorded: June 1957, New York
- Genre: Jazz
- Label: Roulette

Professional ratings
Review scores
Source	Rating
AllMusic	4.5/5 stars
Disc	4/5 stars
The Penguin Guide to Jazz	3/4 stars

Life Is a Many Splendored Gig is an album by the Herb Pomeroy Orchestra.

== Recording and music ==
The album was recorded in New York in June 1957. The arrangements were written by various band members.

== Release ==
The album was released by Roulette Records in 1957 or early 1958. It was issued on CD by Fresh Sound Records more than four decades later.

== Reception ==
The Penguin Guide to Jazz commented that "for admirers of sophisticated big-band music it's an unexpected delight".

== Track listing ==
1. "Blue Grass"
2. "Wolafunt's Lament"
3. "Jack Sprat"
4. "Aluminum Baby"
5. "It's Sandman"
6. "Our Delight"
7. "Theme for Terry"
8. "No One Will Room with Me"
9. "Feather Merchant"
10. "Big Man"
11. "Less Talk"

== Personnel ==
- Herb Pomeroy – trumpet
- Lennie Johnson – trumpet
- Augie Ferretti – trumpet
- Everett Longstreth – trumpet
- Joe Gordon – trumpet
- Joe Ciavardone – trombone
- Bill Legan – trombone
- Gene DiStasio – trombone
- Deane Haskins – baritone sax
- Varty Haroutunian – tenor sax
- Jaki Byard – tenor sax
- Zoot Sims (uncredited) – tenor sax
- Dave Chapman – alto sax
- Boots Mussulli – alto sax
- Ray Santisi – piano
- John Neves – bass
- Jimmy Zitano – drums
