= Flight of the Fly =

Studio album by Jaki Byard
- Recorded: c. 1976
- Genre: Jazz
- Label: Le Chant du Monde

Professional ratings
Review scores
Source	Rating
AllMusic	4/5 stars
The Virgin Encyclopedia of Jazz	3/5 stars

Flight of the Fly is a solo album by jazz pianist Jaki Byard.

== Recording and music ==
The album was recorded for the French label Le Chant du Monde around 1976. The title track contains left-hand stride playing with right-hand hard bop lines. "Sweet Georgia Brown" begins as a ballad but then becomes a stride performance.

== Track listing ==
1. "Flight of the Fly"
2. "Every Year/Stairway to the Stars/Love Is the Sweetest Thing"
3. "Sweet Georgia Brown"
4. "Graduation"
5. "The Avant Garde of 1921"

== Personnel ==
- Jaki Byard – piano
