= Sunshine of My Soul =

Studio album by Jaki Byard
- Released: 1967
- Recorded: October 31, 1967; New York City
- Genre: Jazz
- Label: Prestige; PR 7550
- Producer: Don Schlitten

Jaki Byard chronology
On the Spot! (1967)	Sunshine of My Soul (1967)	Jaki Byard with Strings! (1968)

Sunshine of My Soul is an album by pianist Jaki Byard recorded in 1967 and released on the Prestige label.

== Reception ==
Professional ratings
Review scores
Source	Rating
Allmusic	4/5 stars
The Rolling Stone Jazz Record Guide	3/5 stars
The Penguin Guide to Jazz Recordings	3/4 stars

Allmusic awarded the album 4 stars with its review by Alex Henderson stating "the restless pianist was continuing to experiment and take chances, which is exactly what he does on Sunshine of My Soul". The All About Jazz website stated "Exemplifying one of jazz’s oddballs, this remains one of Byard’s most interesting and accomplished musical puzzles".

== Track listing ==
All compositions by Jaki Byard except as indicated

1. "Sunshine" - 9:33
2. "Cast Away" - 4:09
3. "Chandra" - 8:06
4. "St. Louis Blues" (W. C. Handy) - 6:03
5. "Diane's Melody" - 6:58
6. "Trendsition Zildjian" - 10:58

== Personnel ==
- Jaki Byard - piano, guitar
- David Izenzon - bass
- Elvin Jones - drums
