= Dino and Carlo's =

Bar and music venue in San Francisco, California, U.S.

Coordinates: 37.798586°N 122.409374°W

Dino and Carlo's, also known as Dino—Carlo, and Deno and Carlo's, was an American bar and music venue active from 1965 until 1968, and located at 728 Vallejo Street in the North Beach neighborhood of San Francisco, California.

== History ==
Dino and Carlo's showcased new musical groups, poets, and artists. Most just in the beginning of their careers and many to later become well known. The performers were never paid, they put a hat on the front of the small stage to earn some compensation for their performance. The clientele included longshoreman and hippies. It was a very small club with a small rectangular stage, which barely fit bands like Creedence Clearwater Revival (CCR). CCR had a steady weekly gig performing at Dino and Carlo's.

Many poets had presented their work, among them were Allen Ginsberg, and Richard Brautigan.

The bar was owned by and named after Dino Pettuchi and Carlo Morilla. It was managed by Lou 'the Glue' Marcelli, who was also well known to members of the Dolphin Club in San Francisco. In 1969, Freddie Herrera bought Dino and Carlo's, and he opened a rock and roll club in the location and named it the Keystone Korner.

== Notable acts ==
The notable artists and bands who performed at Dino and Carlo's included:

- Janis Joplin
- Creedence Clearwater Revival
- The Grateful Dead
- Country Joe and the Fish
- Neal Schon
- Harry Chapin
- Jerry Garcia (solo)
- Virgil Gonsalves and quartet
- Elvin Jones
- Carlos Santana
- Cleveland Wrecking Company
- Terry Doland and The Womb
- Celestial Hysteria

There were many talented groups not reaching the popularity of those mentioned above who also performed at Dino and Carlo's. Among them were: the Flamin’ Groovies, Devil's Kitchen, Trudy Broussard Trio, Country Weather, Marble Farm, Little Miss Cornshuck's Loose Troupe, DAEMON (John CASH Farrar), and The Amplified Ohm.

== Muir Beach Lodge ==
With the success of the San Francisco establishment, Dino and Carlo expanded and booked time at the Muir Beach Lodge at Muir Beach in Marin County. They parlayed the success of a local disk jockey affectionately known as "The Buddha from Muir Beach" who already ran concerts at the Lodge. They renamed the Lodge to, "DinoCarlo Naval Base" and many of the same bands played both locations.

Unfortunately the bar later added nude dancing which outraged the local residents of Muir Beach. Eventually the residents had the Lodge condemned and a public park placed at that location.

== See also ==
- North Beach
