= Duet! =

Studio album by Earl Hines and Jaki Byard
- Released: 1975
- Recorded: February 14, 1972; Paris, France
- Genre: Jazz
- Label: MPS
- Producer: Don Schlitten

Jaki Byard chronology
Parisian Solos (1971)	Duet! (1975)	There'll Be Some Changes Made (1972)

Professional ratings
Review scores
Source	Rating
AllMusic	4.5/5 stars

Duet! is a duo album by pianists Earl Hines and Jaki Byard recorded in 1972 and released on the German MPS label. Hines and Byard perform solo on one track each.

== Reception ==
The AllMusic review by Ken Dryden stated the album was "most successful... because of the common ground they shared".

== Track listing ==
All compositions by Jaki Byard, except as indicated

1. "A Toodle Oo, Toodle Oo" - 5:52
2. "This Is Always" (Mack Gordon, Harry Warren) - 3:26
3. "Rosetta" (Earl Hines, Henri Woode) - 4:48
4. "I Can't Trust Myself Alone" (Hines) - 5:12
5. "Sweet Georgia Brown" (Ben Bernie, Maceo Pinkard, Kenneth Casey) - 2:51
6. "As Long as I Live" (Harold Arlen, Ted Koehler) - 5:48
7. "Genoa to Pescara" - 6:15
8. "La Rosita" (Allan Stuart, Paul Dupont) - 4:18

== Personnel ==
- Jaki Byard (tracks 1–3 & 5–8), Earl Hines (tracks 1–6 & 8) – piano
