= Modern Saxophone Stylings of Charlie Mariano =

Studio album by Charlie Mariano
- Recorded: 1951, Boston
- Genre: Jazz
- Label: Imperial

Modern Saxophone Stylings of Charlie Mariano is a 10-inch album by alto saxophonist Charlie Mariano, recorded in 1951.

== Recording and music ==
Modern Saxophone Stylings of Charlie Mariano was recorded in Boston in 1951. The musicians were Mariano on alto sax, trumpeter Herb Pomeroy, pianist Jaki Byard, bassist Jack Carter, and drummer Peter Littman.

== Releases ==
The recording was released as a ten-inch album by Imperial Records. The original cover gave the title as Modern Saxaphone Stylings of Charlie Mariano. It was reissued in Japan by Phantom on August 20, 2002.

== Track listing ==
1. "Chanticleer"
2. "Chopin Excerpts"
3. "April Afternoon"
4. "Chandra"
5. "Sasagapo"
6. "When Your Lover Has Gone"
7. "It's Magic"
8. "American Indian"

== Personnel ==
- Charlie Mariano – alto sax
- Herb Pomeroy – trumpet
- Jaki Byard – piano
- Jack Carter – bass
- Peter Littman – drums
