= Giant Steps (Tommy Flanagan album) =

Studio album by Tommy Flanagan
- Released: 1982
- Recorded: February 17–18, 1982
- Studios: Eurosound, New York City
- Genre: Jazz
- Length: 36:46
- Labels: Enja; 4022
- Producers: Horst Weber, Matthias Winckelmann

Tommy Flanagan chronology
The Magnificent Tommy Flanagan (1981)	Giant Steps (1982)	The Magic of 2 (1982)

Giant Steps (subtitled In Memory of John Coltrane) is an album by pianist Tommy Flanagan, recorded in 1982 and featuring compositions by John Coltrane.

== Reception ==
Professional ratings
Review scores
Source	Rating
AllMusic	4.5/5 stars
The Penguin Guide to Jazz	4/4 stars

AllMusic awarded the album 4.5 stars, with reviewer Bob Rusch stating: "This set was particularly inventive; it was Coltrane's music, but it drinks of its own spirit. You won't listen for the familiar Trane solos, but you will listen!" The Penguin Guide to Jazz wrote in 1996 that it was "one of the finest piano-trio albums of the last 20 years".

== Track listing ==
All compositions by John Coltrane.

1. "Mr. P.C." – 6:38
2. "Central Park West" – 5:38
3. "Syeeda's Song Flute" – 6:01
4. "Cousin Mary" – 7:13
5. "Naima" – 5:02
6. "Giant Steps" – 6:14

== Personnel ==
- Tommy Flanagan – piano
- George Mraz – bass
- Al Foster – drums
