= Charlie Mariano with His Jazz Group =

Studio album by Charlie Mariano
- Recorded: 1950, Boston
- Genre: Jazz
- Label: Imperial

Charlie Mariano with His Jazz Group is a 10-inch album by alto saxophonist Charlie Mariano, recorded in 1950.

== Recording and music ==
Charlie Mariano with His Jazz Group was recorded in Boston in 1950. The musicians were Mariano on alto sax, trumpeter Herb Pomeroy, pianist Jaki Byard, bassist Jack Carter, and drummer Peter Littman.

"Harangue" is a minor blues written by Pomeroy. Byard composed "Diane's Melody". "Jan" and "Ryan's Love" were written by trombonist Jack Crown.

== Releases ==
The recording was released as a ten-inch album by Imperial Records. It was reissued in Japan by Phantom on August 20, 2002.

== Track listing ==
1. "Diane's Melody" – 3:22
2. "Harangue" – 2:54
3. "Sweet and Lovely" – 3:57
4. "Ryan's Love" – 2:37
5. "This Is Heaven" – 2:59
6. "How About You" – 2:45
7. "My Nancy" – 2:55
8. "Jan" – 2:55

== Personnel ==
- Charlie Mariano – alto sax
- Herb Pomeroy – trumpet
- Jaki Byard – piano
- Jack Carter – bass
- Peter Littman – drums
