= Michel Bulteau =

French poet, essayist, short film director and singer

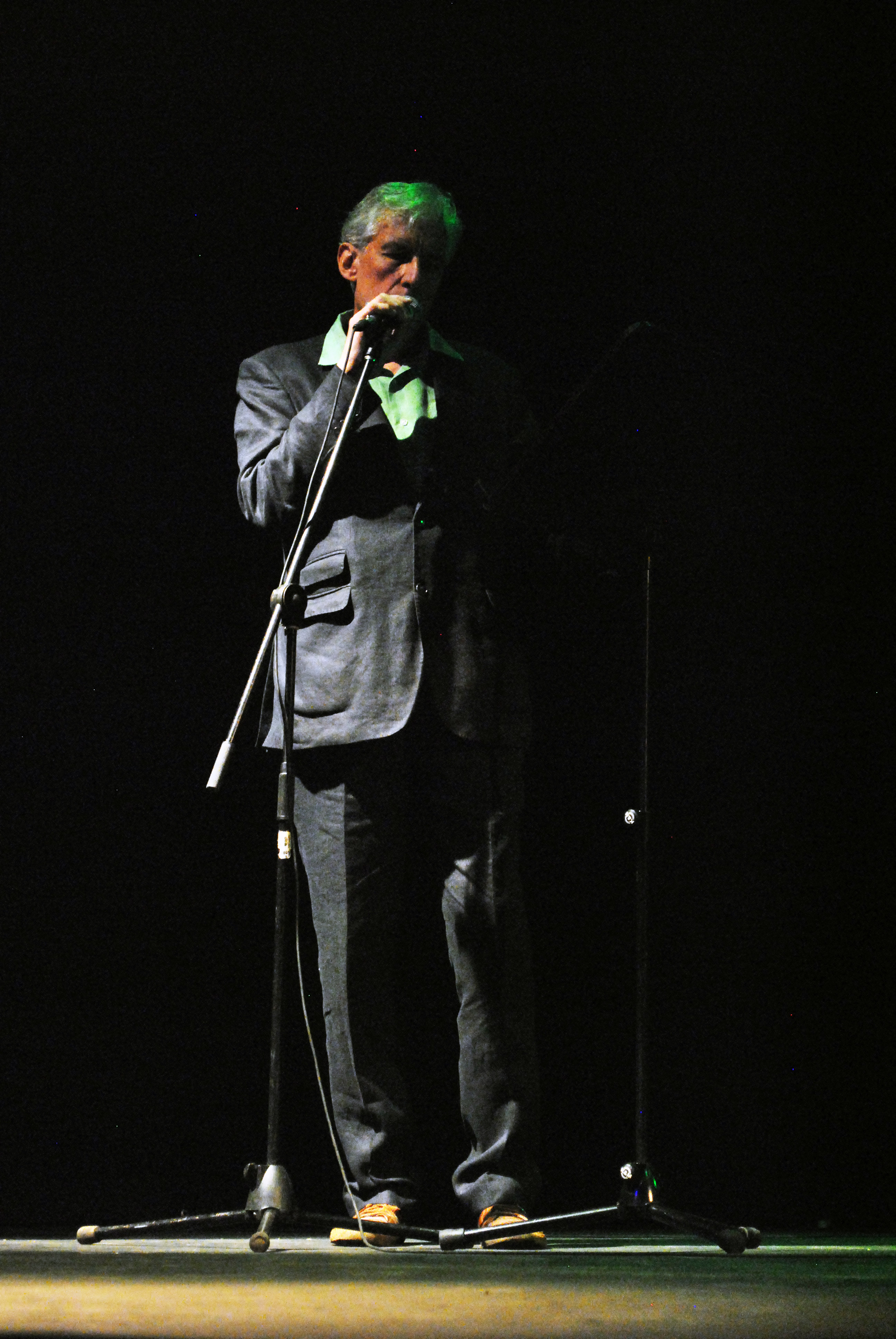
The poet reading Mexico City Blues of Jack Kerouac in Poesía en voz alta festival in Mexico City.

Michel Bulteau is a French poet, essayist, occasional musician and experimental filmmaker, born on 8 October 1949 in Arcueil.

== Biography ==
When he was twenty-two, he contributed with seventeen other young poets, including Matthieu Messagier, Jean-Jacques Faussot, Jacques Ferry, Patrick Geoffrois and Thierry Lamarre to a poetry bundle entitled 'Manifeste Électrique aux paupières de jupes' (Electrical Manifesto with Eyelids of Skirts), which was published in 1971 by Le Soleil Noir. The poetry bundle entitled 'Manifeste Électrique aux paupières de jupes' was a literary manifest that caused a stir in the literary world. Encouraged by the Belgian-French poet and writer, Henri Michaux, he continued his quest as a rebellious poet.

In 1976, he moved to New York where he became friends with beat writers, painters and pop punk musicians. Bulteau is, in the words of William S. Burroughs, an "explorer of untouched psychic areas."

== Work ==
Michel Bulteau was only twenty-one years when '7, Retomba des nuits' (1970), his first book of poetry, was published. The poems in this collection are dark, tragic and desperate and are a reflection of the violence and freedom of the Beat Generation as well as the generation of black surrealism. He would publish many more poetry collections which are all characterised by a hypersensibility. This places him firmly in the tradition of great French writers such as Baudelaire, Nerval and Rimbaud. Bulteau has written that "Being modern is the most dangerous artistic route. Being modern means refusing to be untrue, unreal."(Aérer le présent, 1999).

Michel Bulteau has written more than sixty books including poetry books, biographies of famous persons associated with the beat generation and avant-garde art scene (Allen Ginsberg, James Dean, Andy Warhol) as well as journals and essays. He has been an editor of the Nouvelle Revue de Paris in which he published Houellebecq's early poems.

Michel Bulteau is also active as a musician. He was the lead singer of Mahogany Brain, a band with which he aimed to realise his ideal of a marriage between poetry and rock'n roll. The band played pre-punk music that was influenced by drugs (the original cover of their debut showed an arm with a syringe). Their music was a crossing of Velvet Underground's White Light/White Heat and Captain Beefheart's Trout Mask Replica. The band was quite short-lived: they played their only concert in the summer of 1970 at the Lucemarie during which Bulteau threw bricks at the few members of the audience. After that they became a studio band recording two records. In December 1970 Mahogany Brain recorded the album With (Junk-Saucepan) When (Spoon-Trigger) released by the Futura label early the next year and they also provided the soundtrack to a short film of Bulteau's, Main Line. Another record, Smooth Sick Lights, was recorded on a single day in June 1972, but only released several years in 1976 later by the Pole label. Mahogany Brain issued a new record under the title With/Without in 2004 on Mello Records. Michel Bulteau has recorded a maxi 45 with Elliott Murphy (1989) and a further three solo albums during the nineties and in 2004.

Michel Bulteau has directed and contributed to a number of avant-garde movies which place him in the tradition of experimental directors such as Kenneth Anger, Stan Brackage and Jean Cocteau.

== In Fiction ==
Michel Bulteau appears as a character in the novel The Savage Detectives by Chilean author Roberto Bolaño. In the novel Michel Bulteau meets Ulises Lima, one of the main characters of the novel, in Paris circa 1976. Later, a Peruvian poet, Roberto Rosas, becomes obsessed with his poem "Sang de Satin" as he is trying to translate it into Spanish.

== Bibliography ==
- 7, Retomba des nuits (textes), Aglis Press, 1970
- Manifeste Électrique Aux Paupières de Jupes, Le Soleil Noir, 1971
- Poème A Effraction-Laque, J-J Pauvert, 1972
- Parvis à l'écho des cils (collectif), J-J Pauvert, 1972
- Sang de satin, illustrations de Jacques Hérold, Première personne, 1972
- Les cristaux de foliesuivideWatcris88mots, Electric Press, 1973
- Poudrier de dent (collectif), J-J Faussot éd, 1973
- Ether-Mouth, Slit, Hypodermique, Seghers, 1974
- Venins (collectif), J-J Faussot, 1974
- On My Lap (collectif), Electric Press, 1975
- Des siècles de folie dans les calèches étroites, Belfond, 1976
- Le Maître des abysses, La Lampe Voilée, 1977
- Euridyce d'Esprits, Bourgois, 1979
- La Pyramide de la Vierge, Bourgois, 1979
- Îles serrées, Belfond, 1980
- Enfant Dandy Poème, Bordas et fils, 1980
- L'Aiguille de diamant de l'anéantissement, Le Soleil Noir, 1980
- Discours de la beauté et du cœur, Bordas et fils, 1981
- Le Martyre de M de Palmyre, Éditions du Fourneau, 1982
- Mythologie des filles des eaux, Ed du Rocher, 1982, 1997
- Khôl, A l'Europe galante, 1984
- Anchise et Anadyre, Le Temps qu'il fait, 1984
- James Dean, Presses de la Cité, 1985
- Paul-Jean Toulet l'enchanteur désenchanté, Ed J & D, 1987
- Le club des longues moustaches, Quai Voltaire, 1988
- Flowers (d'après Warhol), La Différence, 1989
- Minuties, La Différence, 1989
- Masques et modèles, La Différence, 1989
- Baron Corvo, l'exilé de Venise, Ed du Rocher, 1990
- Insinuations perfides, Éditions du Scalaire, 1990
- Mort d'un rebelle, Ed du Rocher, 1991
- Poème 1966–1974, La Différence, 1993
- La vie des autres (instantanés), La Différence, 1995
- Poet's Life 1, Electric Press, 1995
- Les analogies de la mort, Electric Press, 1995
- Le Yémen, Ed ACR, 1995
- Le monde d'en face (nouvelles), Ed du Rocher, 1996
- Lanky, derrière la salle de bain, 1996
- XVIII Poèmes (avec Matthieu Messagier), Luvah, 1996, Electric Press
- Post-Peinture et Pré-Musique, Electric Press, 1997
- Aérer le présent (avec Jean-Jacques Fauffot), Paroles d'Aube, 1998
- Prose and Spoon, Electric Press, 1999
- Chérubins(nouvelles), La Revue Commune, 1999
- À New York au milieu des spectres, La Différence, 2000
- Breast pocket notes sur Roy Lichtenstein, L'Échoppe, 2000
- Poet's life III, avec Touhami Ennadre, Les amis du Club, 2000
- Sérénité moyenne (poèmes 1990–1996), Gallimard, 2000
- L'effrayeur (roman), Gallimard, 2000
- La Reine du Pop, La Différence, 2001
- Les zéros absolus (nouvelles), Ed du Rocher, 2001
- Proses bien déprosées (avec Matthieu Messagier), Electric Press, 2001
- Un héros de New York, La Différence, 2003
- Allen Ginsberg, le chant de l'Amérique, La Différence, 2007
- Hoola Hoops, poèmes 1996–2004, La Différence, 2007
- Les Hypnotiseurs, La Différence, 2008
- New York est une fête, La Différence, 2008
- Andy Warhol, le désir d'être peintre, La Différence, 2009
- Apollon jeté à terre, La Différence, 2010

== Filmography ==
- Le destin d'un tueur Two versions, black & white, silent, 8 mm, 3' /color, 9', 1963
- Dernier Rôle 1967
- Une voyelle B in collaboration with Matthieu Messagier, 1968
- La Direction de l'odeur A film of Matthieu Messagier Camera : Michel Bulteau With Jean-Pierre Cretin, Michel Bulteau, Jean-Jacques Faussot and Matthieu Messagier, 1968
- Main Line Camera : Michel Bulteau and Patrick Geoffrois Music : Mahogany Brain Actors: Adeline, Patrick Geoffrois,
- Mine and Michel Bulteau, 1971
- Asnaviràm Music: AC Bhaktivedanta Swami Prabhupada, 1974
- Un naufrage s'offrait Music : Matt Lucas, Little Tony and his brothers, Chris Montez Actor : Adeline 1974–1975
- Impératrice Music : Claudia Muzio Actor: Adeline 1974–1976
- On the Radio, on the screen Actor : Michel Bulteau 1976
- La Lisière de la miséricorde Actor : Adeline and Michel Bulteau 1976
- Astérie Camera : Philippe Puicouyoul, 1979
- Yémen, temps du sacré A film by Layth Abdulamir, script and text by Michel Bulteau 1994
- FiLm 1995
- MB né à Arcueil Camera : Pascal Auger 1996
- Leila's Papers With Natasha Fuentes and Nick Name 1996–1998
- Moving Back in Times Actor: Virginie Petracco 1999

== Discography ==
- With (Junk-Saucepan) When (Spoon-Trigger), with Mahogany Brain, LP, (Futura, 1971), (Réédition, Mellow, 2001)
- Smooth Sick Lights, with Mahogany Brain, LP, (Pole, 1976) (Réédition CD, Spalax Music, 1997)
- Spleens with Elliot Murphy Maxi 45T, (Mix It/New Rose, 1989
- Archidoxe, Ed Paroles d'Aube, 1994
- Dans un monde sonore, (Radio France, 1997)
- Rinçures, (Fractal, 1999)
- Hero Poet, LP, 2004
