= Hi-Fly (Jaki Byard album) =

Studio album by Jaki Byard
- Released: 1962
- Recorded: January 30, 1962
- Studio: Van Gelder Studio, Englewood Cliffs, New Jersey
- Genre: Jazz
- Length: 39:46
- Label: New Jazz; NJLP 8273
- Producer: Esmond Edwards

Jaki Byard chronology
Here's Jaki (1960)	Hi-Fly (1962)	Out Front! (1964)

Hi-Fly is an album by pianist Jaki Byard recorded in 1962 and released on the New Jazz label.

== Reception ==
Professional ratings
Review scores
Source	Rating
Down Beat	4.5/5 stars
Allmusic	4/5 stars
The Penguin Guide to Jazz Recordings	3.5/4 stars

Allmusic awarded the album 4 stars with its review by Robert Taylor stating, "it would be virtually impossible, and futile, to try and duplicate the individual genius of Jaki Byard. This stands as one of his best".

== Track listing ==
All compositions by Jaki Byard except where noted

1. "Hi-Fly" (Randy Weston) – 3:58
2. "Tillie Butterball" – 5:13
3. "Excerpts from "Yamecraw"" (James P. Johnson) – 4:36
4. "There Are Many Worlds" – 5:27
5. "Here to Hear" – 7:44
6. "Lullaby of Birdland" (George Shearing, George David Weiss) – 3:22
7. "'Round Midnight" (Thelonious Monk) – 4:56
8. "Blues in the Closet" (Oscar Pettiford) – 4:28

== Personnel ==
=== Musicians ===
- Jaki Byard – piano
- Ron Carter – bass
- Pete La Roca – drums

=== Production ===
- Esmond Edwards – production
- Nat Hentoff – liner notes
