= Keystones! =

Live album by Red Garland
- Released: 1977
- Recorded: May 12, 1977
- Venue: Keystone Korner, San Francisco
- Genre: Jazz
- Label: Xanadu

Keystones! is a jazz album, by pianist Red Garland, recorded in 1977 for Xanadu Records at Keystone Korner in San Francisco, CA.

== Track listing ==
1. Autumn Leaves
2. It's Impossible
3. Daahoud / New York (theme)
4. It's All Right With Me
5. On Green Dolphin Street / New York Theme (theme)

== Personnel ==
- Red Garland - piano
- Leroy Vinnegar - bassist
- Philly Joe Jones - drums
