= Live in '65 =

Live in '65 is a DVD of an Art Blakey concert in Paris in 1965.

== Background ==
Drummer Art Blakey had many versions of his Jazz Messengers, but for a 1965 tour of Europe he assembled a short-term quintet without using that band name. The other musicians were saxophonist Nathan Davis, trumpeter Freddie Hubbard, pianist Jaki Byard, and bassist Reggie Workman. They had played several concerts before this one, which was at the Palais de la Mutualite in Paris.

== Recording and music ==
The concert was recorded in black and white.

Of the four tracks, "The Hub" and "Crisis" are Hubbard compositions. Hubbard's "strikingly unpredictable solos, at times distantly related to Red Allen's, are the main attraction though Blakey plays a phenomenal solo on 'Crisis', the flashing sticks superimposed very effectively over his smiling face. This track, with solos all round, lasts for 24 minutes and 'Blue Moon' (a feature for Hubbard) and 'The Hub' are also lengthy, with the 'Theme' a very brief closer."

== Release ==
The recording was released as a 60-minute DVD by Jazz Icons, licensed to Naxos Records. "The digital remastering of the slightly grainy black and white source film results in acceptable picture and good audio quality."

== Track listing ==
1. "The Hub"
2. "Blue Moon"
3. "Crisis"
4. "NY Theme"

== Personnel ==
- Art Blakey – drums
- Nathan Davis – saxophone
- Freddie Hubbard – trumpet
- Jaki Byard – piano
- Reggie Workman – bass
