= Jaki Byard =

American jazz musician (1922–1999)

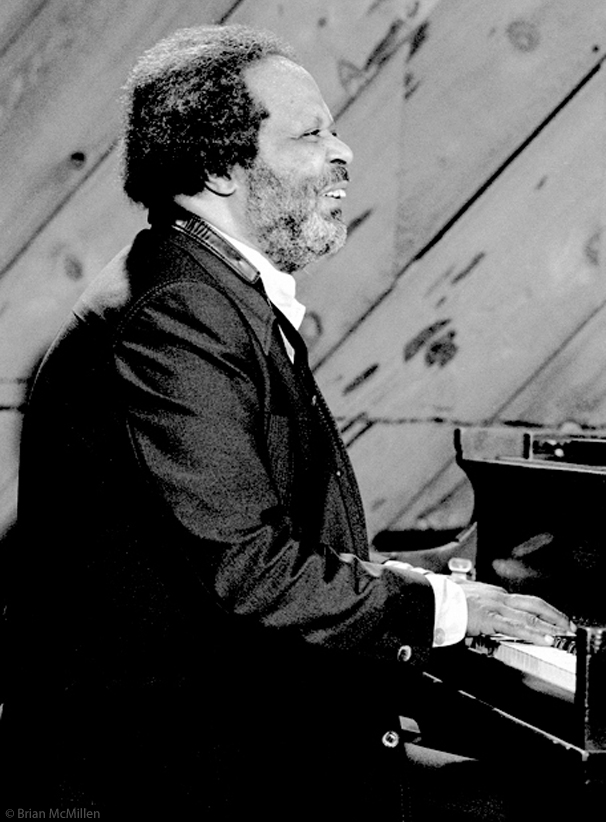
- Byard in 1979

Background information
- Born: John Arthur Byard; June 15, 1922; Worcester, Massachusetts, U.S.
- Died: February 11, 1999 (aged 76) New York City, New York
- Genre: Jazz
- Occupations: Musician, composer, arranger
- Instruments: Piano; tenor saxophone; alto saxophone; various others
- Years active: 1930s–1999
- Labels: Candid; Futura; MPS; Muse; Prestige; Soul Note

John Arthur "Jaki" Byard (/ˈbaɪˌɑːrd, ˈbaɪərd/; June 15, 1922 – February 11, 1999) was an American jazz multi-instrumentalist, composer, and arranger. Mainly a pianist, he also played tenor and alto saxophones, among several other instruments. He was known for his eclectic style, incorporating everything from ragtime and stride to free jazz.

Byard played with trumpeter Maynard Ferguson in the late 1950s and early 1960s, and was a member of bands led by bassist Charles Mingus for several years, including on several studio and concert recordings. The first of his recordings as a leader was in 1960, but, despite being praised by critics, his albums and performances did not gain him much wider attention. In his 60-year career, Byard recorded at least 35 albums as leader, and more than 50 as a sideman. Byard's influence on the music comes from his combining of musical styles during performance, and his parallel career in teaching.

From 1969 Byard was heavily involved in jazz education: he began teaching at the New England Conservatory of Music and went on to work at several other music institutions, as well as having private students. He continued performing and recording, mainly in solo and small group settings, but he also led two big bands – one made up of some of his students, and the other of professional musicians. His death, from a single gunshot while in his home, remains an unsolved mystery.

== Early life ==
Byard was born in Worcester, Massachusetts, on June 15, 1922. At that time, his parents – John Sr and Geraldine Garr – were living at 47 Clayton Street. Both of his parents played musical instruments; his mother played the piano, as did his uncles and grandmother, the last playing in cinemas during the silent film era. He began piano lessons at the age of six, but they ended when his family was affected by the Great Depression. He was also given a trumpet that belonged to his father, and attempted to copy the popular players of the time, Roy Eldridge and Walter Fuller. As a boy he often walked to Lake Quinsigamond to listen to bands performing there. He heard Benny Goodman, Lucky Millinder, Fats Waller, and Chick Webb, and listened to other bands of the era on the radio. "Those were the things that inspired me – I guess it stuck with me", he commented decades later.

Byard began playing professionally on piano at the age of 16, in bands led by Doc Kentross and Freddy Bates. His early lessons had involved mostly playing by rote, so his development of knowledge of theory and further piano technique occurred from the late 1930s until 1941, including studying harmony at Commerce High School. In that year, he was drafted into the army, where he continued with piano lessons and was influenced by pianist Ernie Washington, with whom he was barracked, although Byard also took up trombone at this time. He also studied Stravinsky and Chopin, and continued studying classical composers into the 1960s. Part of his military service was in Florida, where he was a mentor to the young saxophonist Cannonball Adderley and his brother, Nat. After leaving the army in 1946, Byard's musical education continued, through discussions with others, and using library materials combined with music school syllabuses.

== Career as musician ==
Byard played with bands from the Boston area, including for two years with violinist Ray Perry, who encouraged Byard to add tenor saxophone to his array of instruments. He then joined Earl Bostic's band as pianist in 1947 and they toured for around a year. Byard then formed a bebop band with Joe Gordon and Sam Rivers in Boston, before touring for a year with a stage show band. Back once more in Boston, he had a regular job for three years with Charlie Mariano in a club in nearby Lynn. They recorded together in 1953. Byard was a member of Herb Pomeroy's band as a tenor saxophonist from 1952 to 1955, and recorded with him in 1957. Byard also played solo piano in Boston in the early to mid-1950s and freelanced in that area later in the same decade. He joined Maynard Ferguson in 1959, and stayed until 1962. As one of Ferguson's players and arrangers, Byard found that his own preference for experimentation in time signatures, harmony and freer improvisation was restricted by the preferences of other band members.

Byard moved to New York City in the early 1960s. His first recording as a leader, the solo piano Blues for Smoke, was recorded there on December 16, 1960 (but not released in the United States until 1988). Also in 1960, Byard first played with the bassist Charles Mingus. He recorded extensively with Mingus in the period 1962–64 (including on the important albums released by Impulse! Records – Mingus Mingus Mingus Mingus Mingus and The Black Saint and the Sinner Lady), and toured Europe with him in 1964. Byard also made recordings as a sideman between 1960 and 1966 with Eric Dolphy, Booker Ervin, Roland Kirk, and Rivers. His performance on Dolphy's Outward Bound put Byard at the forefront of modern jazz.

As a leader, Byard recorded a string of albums for the Prestige label during the 1960s. Some of these albums included Richard Davis on bass and Alan Dawson on drums, a trio combination described by critic Gary Giddins as "the most commanding rhythm section of the '60s, excepting the Hancock-Carter-Williams trio in Miles Davis's band", although it existed only for recordings. One such album was Jaki Byard with Strings!, a sextet recording that featured Byard's composing and arranging: on "Cat's Cradle Conference Rag", each of five musicians "play five standards based on similar harmonies simultaneously". A further example of Byard's sometimes unusual approach to composition is the title track from Out Front!, which he created by thinking of fellow pianist Herbie Nichols' touch at the keyboard. Popularity with jazz critics did not translate into wider success: a Washington Post review of his final Prestige album, Solo Piano from 1969, remarked that it was by "a man who has been largely ignored outside the inner circles". Giddins also commented in the 1970s on the lack of attention that Byard had received, and stated that the pianist's recordings from 1960 to 1972 "are dazzling in scope, and for his ability to make the most of limited situations". Following his time with Prestige, Byard had more solo performances, in part because of his affection for musical partners he had become close to but who had then died.

Byard also continued to play and record with other leaders. While in Europe in 1965, he joined Art Blakey's band for a series of concerts there. In 1967 Byard played in a small group with drummer Elvin Jones. Between 1966 and 1969 Byard recorded three albums with the saxophonist Eric Kloss, then, in 1970, returned to Mingus' band, including for performances in Europe. Byard occasionally substituted on piano in Duke Ellington's orchestra in 1974 when the leader was unwell. In 1974–75 Byard had a residency at Bradley's in New York. He also fronted a big band, the Apollo Stompers, which was formed in the late 1970s. There were two versions of the band: one made up of musicians in New York, and the other using students from the New England Conservatory of Music, where Byard had taught from 1969.

In 1980 Byard was the subject of a short documentary film, Anything for Jazz, which featured him playing, teaching and with his family. By the 1980s his main instrument remained the piano, and he still played both alto and tenor saxophones, but he had stopped playing the other instruments that he used to use professionally – bass, drums, guitar, trombone, and trumpet, although he still taught all of them. In the same period, he was often heard in New York playing solo, in duos, or in trios. In 1988 he played with a band founded by Mingus' widow, Sue Mingus, to perform the bassist's compositions – the Mingus Big Band. Byard played and recorded with a former student of his, Ricky Ford, from 1989 to 1991, and continued to play and teach during the 1990s.

== Career as teacher ==
A charter faculty member of the New England Conservatory of Music jazz studies program, initially named 'Afro-American Music', Byard stayed for more than 15 years. He also taught at the Hartt School of Music from 1975, the Manhattan School of Music from 1989 to 1999, the New School for Jazz and Contemporary Music, and lectured for three years at Harvard University.

As teacher and player, Byard was renowned for his knowledge of the history of jazz piano. This meant that some aspiring young musicians sought him out as a teacher. One of these was pianist Jason Moran, who described their first meeting, at a performance by the Apollo Stompers:

Jaki had all these toys and whistles and bells and things that he was playing from the piano, and also screaming and yelling from the piano in joy. I remember thinking, 'This guy's out of his mind.' After the set, I went up to him, introduced myself, and said that I would be studying with him. He said something to the effect of, 'get ready'.

Moran studied with Byard for four years, and credits the older man with developing his skills, building his awareness of jazz history, and creating his willingness to experiment with different styles. Another student, Fred Hersch, reported that Byard was both organized and chaotic as a teacher: giving his students worksheets and having them study early stride piano, but also behaving eccentrically and missing lessons. Classical composer Bruce Wolosoff was taught by Byard at the New England Conservatory and counts him as an important influence. Pianist and singer-songwriter Grayson Hugh studied with Byard in the early 1970s and reported that, "more than anyone, Jaki Byard exploded my young harmonic mind".

Jazz flautist Jamie Baum also studied with Byard, and after his death organized a tribute band consisting mainly of his students: Baum, Adam Kolker, Jerome Harris, George Schuller and Ugonna Okegwo, called Yard Byard or The Jaki Byard Project, using compositions Byard had left with Baum but never performed.

== Death ==
Byard died in his home in Hollis, Queens, New York City, of a gunshot wound on February 11, 1999. He was shot once in the head. The police reported that Byard's family, with whom he shared the house, last saw him at 6 pm, that he was killed around 10 pm, that there "were no signs of robbery, forced entry or a struggle", and that no weapon was found. The death was soon declared to be a homicide, but the circumstances surrounding it have not been determined, and the case remains unsolved.

Byard was survived by two daughters, a son, four grandchildren, and six great-grandchildren. His wife of four decades had died five years earlier.

== Playing style and influence ==
Giddins described the nature of Byard's piano playing: "His tone [...] is unfailingly bright. His middle-register improvisations are evenly articulated with a strong touch and rhythmic elan [... he] likes ringing tremolos and portentous fifths [... and] barely articulated keyboard washes that float beyond the harmonic bounds but are ultimately anchored by the blues". Byard played in a variety of styles, often mixed together in one performance: John S. Wilson commented that Byard "progresses from a basic melodic statement to nimble Art Tatum fingering to Fats Waller stride, to prickly Thelonious Monk phrases, to Cecil Taylor dissonances". This could have deliberately comic, surrealistic effects.

Byard pointed out that the use of humor did not mean that his music was not serious: "I might do it with humor, but it's still serious because I mean what I'm doing". He stated that his choice to play in a variety of styles was not imitatory or superficial: "I can't play one way all night; I wouldn't want to and I wouldn't want the public to hear me that way". One obituary writer noted that, "Nobody thinks it odd if a pianist underpins melody with stride patterns or a boogie bass. When Byard did that 30 years ago, distinctions were drawn more tightly". Music writer Dan Lander also stated that Byard's playing was ahead of its time, and added that it has influenced 21st-century pianists:

Byard's grasp and integration of historical forms, his ability to embrace tradition and risk taking, was visionary, impacting on a new generation of jazz musicians who understood the history of jazz as a material to build on and work with, at the service of creating something new, rather than as an unmovable weight, fixing them to the past.

A 1968 review of a Byard concert reported that his alto saxophone playing was "in a manner rooted in the bop era", and that he occasionally accompanied himself, "saxophone with his left hand, piano with his right". His playing on tenor saxophone was influenced by Lester Young; Byard himself cited Ben Webster as an influence on his tenor ballad playing.

== Discography ==
=== As leader/co-leader ===
Byard plays only piano, unless otherwise noted.

Recording date	Title	Label	Year released	Notes
1960-12	Blues for Smoke	Candid	1988	Solo piano
1961-03	Here's Jaki	New Jazz	1961	Trio, with Ron Carter (bass), Roy Haynes (drums); Byard also plays alto sax
1962-01	Hi-Fly	New Jazz	1962	Trio, with Ron Carter (bass), Pete La Roca (drums)
1961-03, 1964-05	Out Front!	Prestige	1965	Trio, with Bob Cranshaw and Ron Carter (bass; separately), Walter Perkins and Roy Haynes (drums; separately); quintet with Richard Williams (trumpet), Booker Ervin (tenor sax) added on some tracks; Byard also plays alto sax
1965-04	Jaki Byard Quartet Live! (Vol. 1 and Vol.2)	Prestige	1965	Quartet, with Joe Farrell (tenor sax, soprano sax, flute), George Tucker (bass), Alan Dawson (drums, vibraphone); in concert
1965-04	The Last from Lennie's	Prestige	2003	Personnel as Jaki Byard Quartet Live!, Vol. 1; in concert
1966-01	Freedom Together!	Prestige	1966	Trio, with Richard Davis (bass, cello), Alan Dawson (drums, vibraphone); Junior Parker (vocals) on some tracks; Byard also plays electric piano, celeste, vibraphone, tenor sax, drums
1967-02	On the Spot!	Prestige	1967	Quartet, with Jimmy Owens (trumpet, flugelhorn), Paul Chambers (bass), Billy Higgins (drums); trio with George Tucker (bass), Alan Dawson (drums) on one track; Byard also plays alto sax
1967-10	Sunshine of My Soul	Prestige	1967	Trio, with David Izenzon (bass), Elvin Jones (drums); Byard also plays guitar
1968-04	Jaki Byard with Strings!	Prestige	1968	Sextet, with George Benson (guitar), Ray Nance (violin, vocals), Ron Carter (cello), Richard Davis (bass), Alan Dawson (drums, vibraphone); Byard also plays organ
1968-09	The Jaki Byard Experience	Prestige	1969	Quartet, with Roland Kirk (tenor sax, manzello, clarinet, whistle), Richard Davis (bass), Alan Dawson (drums)
1969-07	Solo Piano	Prestige	1969	Solo piano
1971-07	Live at the Jazz'Inn	Futura	1971	Trio, with Gus Nemeth (bass), Jean My Truong and Gerald Byard (drums; separately); in concert
1971-07	Parisian Solos	Futura	1971	Solo piano
1972-02	Duet!	MPS	1975	Duo, with Earl Hines (piano)
1972-07	The Entertainer	Victor	1972	Solo piano
1972	There'll Be Some Changes Made	Muse	1973	Solo piano; also released as Empirical
1976	Flight of the Fly	Le Chant du Monde	1977	Solo piano
1978-04, 1978-05	Family Man	Muse	1979	Trio, with Major Holley (bass, tuba), J. R. Mitchell (drums); Warren Smith (drums, vibraphone) replaces Smith on some tracks; Byard also plays tenor sax, alto sax
1978-06	Sunshine of My Soul: Live at the Keystone Korner	HighNote	2007	Solo piano; in concert
1978– 1979	A Matter of Black and White	HighNote	2011	Solo piano; in concert
1979-08	The Late Show: An Evening with Jaki Byard	HighNote	2014	Solo piano; in concert
1981-05	Improvisations	Soul Note	1982	Duo, with Ran Blake (piano)
1981-05	To Them – To Us	Soul Note	1982	Solo piano
1982-02	The Magic of 2	Resonance	2013	Duo, with Tommy Flanagan (piano); some solo piano
1984-08	Live at the Royal Festival Hall	Leo	1987	Duo, with Howard Riley (piano); some solo piano
1984-09	Phantasies	Soul Note	1984	With the Apollo Stompers
1988-08	Phantasies II	Soul Note	1988	With the Apollo Stompers
1988-08	Foolin' Myself	Soul Note	1989	Trio, with Ralph Hamperian (bass), Richard Allen (drums)
1991-09	Jaki Byard at Maybeck	Concord	1992	Solo piano; in concert
1996-01	The Changes of Life	Meldac	2001	Trio, with Ralph Hamperian (bass), Richard Allen (drums)
1996-12	This Happening	Justin Time	1997	Duo, with Michael Marcus (various reed instruments)
1997-01	Night Leaves	Brownstone	1997	Duo, with David Eyges (electric cello)
1998-07	July in Paris	Fairplay	1999	Trio, with Ralph Hamperian (bass), Richard Allen (drums); quartet with Ricky Ford (tenor sax) added on some tracks; in concert
1998-03	My Mother's Eyes	Fairplay	2000	With the Apollo Stompers

=== As sideman ===
An asterisk (*) indicates that the year is that of release.

Year recorded	Leader	Title	Label
1965	Art Blakey	Live in '65	Jazz Icons [DVD]
1973	Al Cohn and Zoot Sims	Body and Soul	Muse
1960–61	Chris Connor and Maynard Ferguson	Double Exposure	Atlantic
1960	Eric Dolphy	Far Cry	New Jazz
1960	Eric Dolphy	Outward Bound	Prestige
1960	Don Ellis	How Time Passes	Candid
1961	Don Ellis	New Ideas	New Jazz
1963	Booker Ervin	The Freedom Book	Prestige
1964	Booker Ervin	The Space Book	Prestige
1963–64	Booker Ervin	Groovin' High	Prestige
1965	Booker Ervin	The Trance	Prestige
1965	Booker Ervin	Setting the Pace	Prestige
1966	Booker Ervin	Heavy!!!	Prestige
1960	Maynard Ferguson	Newport Suite	Roulette
1960	Maynard Ferguson	Let's Face the Music and Dance	Roulette
1961	Maynard Ferguson	Maynard '61	Roulette
1961	Maynard Ferguson and Chris Connor	Two's Company	Roulette
1961	Maynard Ferguson	"Straightaway" Jazz Themes	Roulette
1961	Maynard Ferguson	Maynard '64	Roulette
1978	Ricky Ford	Manhattan Plaza	Muse
1989	Ricky Ford	Manhattan Blues	Candid
1990	Ricky Ford	Ebony Rhapsody	Candid
1991	Ricky Ford	American-African Blues	Candid
1962	Honi Gordon	Honi Gordon Sings	Prestige
1971	Quincy Jones	Smackwater Jack	A&M
1964*	Rufus Jones	Five on Eight	Cameo
1984	Clifford Jordan	Dr. Chicago	Bee Hive
1965	Roland Kirk	Rip Rig & Panic	Limelight
1966	Roland Kirk	Here Comes the Whistleman	Atlantic
1966	Eric Kloss	Grits & Gravy	Prestige
1968	Eric Kloss	Sky Shadows	Prestige
1969	Eric Kloss	In the Land of the Giants	Prestige
1998	Michael Marcus	Involution	Justin Time
1950	Charlie Mariano	Charlie Mariano with His Jazz Group	Imperial
1951	Charlie Mariano	Modern Saxophone Stylings of Charlie Mariano	Imperial
1962	Makanda Ken McIntyre	Year of the Iron Sheep	United Artists
1975	Makanda Ken McIntyre	Home	SteepleChase
1962	Charles Mingus	The Complete Town Hall Concert	Blue Note
1963	Charles Mingus	The Black Saint and the Sinner Lady	Impulse!
1963	Charles Mingus	Mingus Mingus Mingus Mingus Mingus	Impulse!
1964	Charles Mingus	Town Hall Concert	Jazz Workshop
1964	Charles Mingus	The Great Concert of Charles Mingus	America
1964	Charles Mingus	Mingus in Europe Volume I	Enja
1964	Charles Mingus	Mingus in Europe Volume II	Enja
1964	Charles Mingus	Mingus at Monterey	Jazz Workshop
1964	Charles Mingus	Astral Weeks	Moon
1964	Charles Mingus	Charles Mingus Sextet with Eric Dolphy Cornell 1964	Blue Note
1964	Charles Mingus	Revenge!	Revenge
1970	Charles Mingus	Charles Mingus in Paris: The Complete America Session	Sunnyside
1970	Charles Mingus	Charles Mingus Sextet In Berlin	Beppo
1988	Mingus Dynasty	Live at the Theatre Boulogne-Billancourt/Paris, Vol. 1	Soul Note
1988	Mingus Dynasty	Live at the Theatre Boulogne-Billancourt/Paris, Vol. 2	Soul Note
1969	Ray Nance	Body and Soul	Solid State
1957	Herb Pomeroy	Life Is a Many Splendored Gig	Roulette
1965	Dannie Richmond	"In" Jazz for the Culture Set	Impulse!
1964	Sam Rivers	Fuchsia Swing Song	Blue Note
1985	Jordan Sandke	Rhythm Is Our Business	Stash
1978	Archie Shepp	Lady Bird	Denon
1981	(Various)	Amarcord Nino Rota	Hannibal
1974	Phil Woods	Musique du Bois	Muse
