= Jaki Byard Quartet Live! =

Live album by Jaki Byard Quartet
- Released: 1965
- Recorded: April 15, 1965; Lennie's On The Turnpike in West Peabody, Massachusetts
- Genre: Jazz
- Length: 76:03
- Label: Prestige; PR 7419 and PR 7477

Jaki Byard chronology
Out Front! (1964)	Jaki Byard Quartet Live! (1965)	The Last from Lennie's (1966)

Jaki Byard Quartet Live! is an album by pianist Jaki Byard recorded in 1965 and originally released on the Prestige label as two long LP records and later reissued in 1992 as a single CD.

== Reception ==
Professional ratings
Review scores
Source	Rating
Allmusic	4.5/5 stars
The Rolling Stone Jazz Record Guide	2/5 stars
The Penguin Guide to Jazz Recordings	3/4 stars

AllMusic awarded the album 4½ stars with its review by Scott Yanow stating, "The set, recorded live at Lennie's-on-the-Turnpike in Massachusetts, is a superior outing for all of the players... Recommended". Gary Giddins was also positive, and picked out "Twelve" from "the inspired quartet performances": "this piece has free episodes resolved by blues choruses, and Byard's comping is so vigorous that he makes the quartet sound like a larger band".

== Track listing ==
All compositions by Jaki Byard except as indicated

1. "Twelve" – 12:10 Originally released on Vol. 1
2. "Denise" – 9:41 Originally released on Vol. 1
3. "Thing What Is" (Alan Dawson) – 11:36 Originally released on Vol. 1
4. "Broadway" (Billy Bird, Teddy McRae, Henri Woode) – 13:39 Originally released on Vol. 1
5. "Alan's Got Rhythm" (Byard, Dawson) – 10:28 Originally released on Vol. 2
6. "Cathy" (Joe Farrell) – 8:08 Originally released on Vol. 2
7. "Bass-Ment Blues" – 11:18 Originally released on Vol. 2

== Personnel ==
- Jaki Byard – piano
- Joe Farrell – tenor saxophone, soprano saxophone, flute, drums
- George Tucker – bass
- Alan Dawson – drums, vibraphone
