= Family Man (Jaki Byard album) =

Studio album by Jaki Byard
- Released: 1979
- Recorded: April 28 and May 1, 1978; CI Recording, New York City
- Genre: Jazz
- Length: 41:14
- Label: Muse; MR 5173
- Producer: Frederick Seibert

Jaki Byard chronology
There'll Be Some Changes Made (1972)	Family Man (1979)	Improvisations (1981)

Professional ratings
Review scores
Source	Rating
Allmusic	3/5 stars
The Rolling Stone Jazz Record Guide	4/5 stars
DownBeat	4/5 stars

Family Man is an album by pianist Jaki Byard recorded in 1978 and released on the Muse label.

== Reception ==
Allmusic awarded the album 3 stars with a review stating, "A typically stimulating and eclectic program of music by Jaki Byard".

== Track listing ==
All compositions by Jaki Byard except as indicated

1. "Just Rollin' Along" - 8:07
2. "Mood Indigo / Chelsea Bridge" (Barney Bigard, Duke Ellington, Irving Mills / Billy Strayhorn) - 6:41
3. "L.H. Gatewalk Rag" - 4:07
4. "Ballad to Louise" - 4:37
5. "Prelude #16" - 3:36
6. "Gaeta" - 4:36
7. "Garr" - 3:21
8. "Emil" - 3:14
9. "John Arthur" - 2:55

== Personnel ==
- Jaki Byard - piano, tenor saxophone, alto saxophone
- Major Holley - bass, electric bass, tuba
- J. R. Mitchell - drums, timpani, vibraphone
- Warren Smith - drums (tracks 5–9)
