= Here's Jaki =

Studio album by Jaki Byard
- Released: 1961
- Recorded: March 14, 1961
- Studio: Van Gelder (Englewood Cliffs, New Jersey)
- Genre: Jazz
- Length: 38:58
- Label: New Jazz; NJLP 8256
- Producer: Esmond Edwards

Jaki Byard chronology
| Blues for Smoke (1960) | Here's Jaki (1961) | Hi-Fly (1962) |

Here's Jaki is an album by pianist Jaki Byard recorded in 1961 and released on the New Jazz label.

== Music ==
"Cinco y Quatro" is a calypso in 5/4 time. "Garnerin' a Bit" is a tribute to pianist Erroll Garner. This album is also notable for having the first recorded cover of John Coltrane's jazz composition Giant Steps. The LP's original liner notes state that the composition "D.D.L.J." was named by combining the initials of the first names of Byard, his wife Louise, and the two children they had at the time, Denise and Diane.

== Reception ==
Professional ratings
Review scores
| Source | Rating |
|---|---|
| AllMusic | 3/5 stars |
| Down Beat | 3/5 stars |
| The Penguin Guide to Jazz Recordings | 3.5/4 stars |

The AllMusic site awarded the album 3 stars, stating "This is no standard trio; they're a collective who romps through these seven selections with a surprise or more a minute".

== Track listing ==
All compositions by Jaki Byard except as indicated

1. "Cinco y Quatro" – 6:26
2. "Mellow Septet" – 5:38
3. "Garnerin' a Bit" – 5:49
4. "Giant Steps" (John Coltrane) – 2:22
5. "Bess, You Is My Woman Now/It Ain't Necessarily So" (George Gershwin, Ira Gershwin) – 9:53
6. "To My Wife" – 5:13
7. "D.D.L.J." – 3:50

== Personnel ==
- Jaki Byard – piano, alto saxophone
- Ron Carter – bass
- Roy Haynes – drums
