= Phantasies (album) =

Studio album by Jaki Byard and the Apollo Stompers
- Released: 1984
- Recorded: September 25–26, 1984
- Genre: Jazz
- Length: 42:34
- Label: Soul Note
- Producer: Giovanni Bonandrini

Jaki Byard chronology
To Them - To Us (1981)	Phantasies (1984)	Phantasies II (1988)

Phantasies is an album by the American jazz pianist Jaki Byard with the Apollo Stompers, recorded in 1984 and released on the Italian Soul Note label.

== Reception ==
Professional ratings
Review scores
Source	Rating
AllMusic	3/5 stars
The Penguin Guide to Jazz Recordings	3/4 stars

The AllMusic review by Scott Yanow stated: "This outing by Jaki Byard's big band The Apollo Stompers does not quite live up to its potential... The real reason to acquire this admittedly spirited set is for the occasional (and always notable) piano solos". The Penguin Guide to Jazz concluded that, "although well produced and more than adequately executed, the album drifts towards pastiche and pointless eclepticism."

== Track listing ==
1. "I May Be Wrong (But I Think You're Wonderful)" (Henry Sullivan) – 2:49
2. "Medley: Black and Tan Fantasy/Prelude No. 29/Prelude to a Kiss/Do Nothing till You Hear from Me" (Duke Ellington, Bubber Miley/Ellington, Irving Mills/Ellington) – 8:57
3. "One Note to My Wife" (Jaki Byard) – 3:15
4. "5/4 Medley: Take Five/Cinco Quatro Boogie Woogie/Take Five" (Paul Desmond/Byard/Desmond) – 6:12
5. "Medley: Lonely Woman/So What/Impressions/Olean Visit/Some Other Spring" (Ornette Coleman/Miles Davis/John Coltrane/Byard/Irene Kitchings, Arthur Herzog, Jr.) – 8:01
6. "It's Too Late" (Carole King) – 3:16
7. "Tricotism" (Oscar Pettiford) – 4:27
8. "Lover Man" (Jimmy Davis, Ram Ramirez, James Sherman) – 5:37

- Recorded at Vanguard Studios in New York City on September 25 & 26, 1984

== Personnel ==
- Jaki Byard – piano
- Roger Parrot, Al Bryant, John Eckert, Jim White – trumpet
- Steve Wienberg, Steve Swell, Carl Reinlib, Bob Norden – trombone
- Stephen Calia – bass trombone
- Bob Torrente, Manny Boyd – alto saxophone
- Jed Levy, Alan Givens – tenor saxophone
- Preston Trombly – baritone saxophone
- Dan Licht – guitar
- Ralph Hamperian – bass
- Richard Allen – drums
- Deynce Byard, Diane Byard – vocals, tambourine
