= David Eyges =

American jazz cellist, composer, and producer

- Born: David MacAulay Eyges; November 6, 1950 (age 75); San Francisco, California, U.S.
- Genres: Jazz
- Occupations: Musician, composer, record producer
- Instruments: Cello, electric cello
- Years active: Mid-1970s–present
- Label: MidLantic

David MacAulay Eyges (born November 6, 1950) is an American jazz cellist, composer, and record producer.

== Early life ==
Eyges was born in San Francisco on November 6, 1950. His family settled in Belmont, Massachusetts, in 1953. He began playing the piano aged five and had cello lessons from age 11. In 1968–69 he studied at Boston University, and he was awarded a BA for cello studies by the Manhattan School of Music in 1972. Encounters with blues musicians in Cambridge, Massachusetts, were an important influence, as Eyges sought to transfer elements of their music to the cello.

== Later life and career ==
"Eyges worked for a few years in various concert orchestras and theater ensembles, sometimes earning fees providing background music for commercials." His recording career began in 1974, with vibraphonist Bobby Paunetto. Eyges's debut album as leader – The Captain – came three years later. He married in 1976 and a son was born in 1984. Two further albums were released on his own label in the early 1980s – The Arrow (with Byard Lancaster) and Crossroads (with Lancaster and Sunny Murray).

From 1987 Eyges specialized in playing a Tucker F. Barrett solid-body electric cello. He commented that, in addition to being able to produce a variety of colours from the instrument, it had two advantages over an acoustic cello: "volume, because playing an acoustic instrument with a fierce drummer just doesn't make it; and transportability, since I can safely put it in the baggage compartments of planes and trains."

Eyges's playing influenced later generations of creative cellists, who appeared from the 1990s. He formed MidLantic Records in 2002 and produced albums for the label, as well as continuing to play.

== Playing style ==
Jon Pareles noted two facets of Eyges's playing in 1983. When plucking, his trio (James Emery on guitar and Sunny Murray on drums) was bluesy and "Eyges treated his cello as a percussive instrument". When bowing, "the pieces called for long-breathed melodies".
