= Michael Marcus (musician) =

American jazz clarinetist and saxophonist

- Born: August 25, 1952 (age 73); San Francisco, California
- Genres: Jazz
- Occupation: Musician
- Instruments: Clarinets, Saxophones, Tarogatos, Flutes & Octavins.
- Years active: 1970s–present
- Label: ESP Records
- Website: michaelmarcusmusic.com

Michael Marcus (August 25, 1952) Is an American Jazz multi-woodwind player & composer. He plays saxophones, clarinets, flutes, taragatos and octavins.

In 1991 Enja released Under the Wire, his debut album as a leader. He has worked & recorded with artists including: Albert King, Bobby "Blue" Bland, Frank Lowe, Carlos "Patato" Valdes, Jaki Byard, Rahn Burton, Vince Wallace, Fred Hopkins, Denis Charles, Jay Rosen, Tarus Mateen, Joe Bowie, Perry Robinson, Warren Smith and Edgar Bateman to name a few.

Marcus and Ted Daniel comprise Duology, which has collaborated with Andrew Cyrille and Henry Grimes. With Sonny Simmons, he is the co-leader of The Cosmosamatics.

Michael was rewarded an individual performance grant from the NEA (National Endowment of the Arts)-composing for a string quartet in conjunction with his original music.

== Discography ==
=== As leader ===
- Under the Wire w/ Joe Bowie, William Parker [Enja Records], 1990
- Here At! (Soul Note Records), 1993
- Ithem (Ayler Records) 1994
- Reachin' (Justin Time Records), 1996
- This Happening (Justin Time) 1997 w Jaki Byard
- Involution (Justin Time, 1998) w/ Jaki Byard Trio
- Live in N.Y. (Soul Note, 1999)
- In the Center of it All (Justin Time) 2000
- Sunwheels (Justin Time) 2001
- Blue Reality (Soul Note) 2002
- Speakin Out (Drimala) 2002
- Soulifications (Soul Note) 2005
- The Magic Door (Not Two) 2007
- Lotus Symphony (Not Two) 2008
- For Yes! (Not Two) 2010
- Elements in Candor (For Tune) 2016 w/ Theo Jorgensmann
- Stone Jump (Not Two), 2021
- Abstractions in Lime Caverns (ESP-Disk'), 2022
- Next Stop Down (ESP-Disk), 2026

'"The Cosmosamatics" w/ Sonny Simmons'

- The Cosmosamatics (Boxholder, 2001)
- The Cosmosamatics II (Boxholder, 2002)
- Live at Banlieues w/ Andrew Cyrille (Bleu Regard, 2003)
- Three (Boxholder, 2004)
- Reeds & Birds (Not Two, 2004)
- Magnitudes (Soul Note, 2005)
- Zetrons (Not Two, 2005)
- Free within the Law (Not Two, 2008)
- Jazz-Maalika (Saptak, 2013)

"Duology" w/ Ted Daniel

- Duology ( Boxholder) 2007
- Golden Atoms ( Soul Note ) 2008
- Duology w/ Andrew Cyrille (Jazz Werkstatt ) 2011
- Duology w/ Henry Grimes ( Ujjama ) 2019

- The Saxemble w/ Frank Lowe, James Carter, Cassius Richmond, Cindy Blackman (Qwest/Warner)

- N.Y. Clarinet Society w/ Perry Robinson (FSR Records)

- Blue Reality Quartet w/ Joe McPhee'-Warren Smith-Jay Rosen (Mahakala) 2021
- Blue Reality Quartet Ella's Island (Mahakala) 2022

 '
