= Phantasies II =

Studio album by Jaki Byard and the Apollo Stompers
- Released: 1988
- Recorded: August 23–24, 1988
- Genre: Jazz
- Length: 42:12
- Label: Soul Note
- Producer: Giovanni Bonandrini

Jaki Byard chronology
Phantasies (1984)	Phantasies II (1988)	Foolin' Myself (1988)

Phantasies II is an album by the American jazz pianist Jaki Byard with the Apollo Stompers, recorded in 1988 and released on the Italian Soul Note label. The album follows Byard's big band tributes album Phantasies (1984).

== Reception ==
The AllMusic review by Scott Yanow stated, "The second CD featuring Jaki Byard's Apollo Stompers (a young big band) is actually superior to the first one. Although most of the soloists remain obscure, the material is more stimulating than on the debut set... His very versatile piano has its share of short solos, hinting at many earlier jazz styles".

Professional ratings
Review scores
Source	Rating
AllMusic	2.5/5 stars
The Penguin Guide to Jazz	3.5/4 stars

== Track listing ==
All compositions by Jaki Byard except as indicated

1. "Manhattan" (Lorenz Hart, Richard Rodgers) – 1:57
2. "New York Is a Lonely Town" (Peter Andreoli, Vini Poncia) – 4:30
3. "2-5-1" – 5:38
4. "BJC Blues (Dedicated to B.B. King)" – 4:05
5. "Up Jumps One (Dedicated to Count Basie)" – 7:20
6. "Concerto Grosso Part 1: Mellow Septet" – 5:11
7. "Concerto Grosso Part 2 : There Are Many Worlds" – 4:38
8. "June Night" (Abel Baer, Cliff Friend) – 2:29
9. "Send in the Clowns" (Stephen Sondheim) – 2:38
10. "Bright Moments" (Rahsaan Roland Kirk) – 3:46

- Recorded at Sound Ideas Studios in New York City on August 23 & 24, 1988

== Personnel ==
- Jaki Byard – piano
- Roger Parrot, Al Bryant, Graham Haynes, Jim White – trumpet
- Steve Calial, Rick Davies, Steve Swell, Carl Reinlib – trombone
- Bob Torrence, Susan Terry – alto saxophone
- Jed Levy, Bruce "Bud" Revels – tenor saxophone
- Don Slatoff – baritone saxophone
- Peter Lieich – guitar
- Ralph Hamperian – bass
- Richard Allen – drums
- Vincent Lewis, Diane Byard – vocals
