= Futura Records =

- Founded: 1969
- Founder: Gérard Terronès
- Genre: Free jazz, jazz
- Country of origin: FR
- Location: Paris, Lyon
- Official website: www.futuramarge.bandcamp.com

Futura Records is a French record company and jazz record label founded in 1969 by Gérard Terronès. Marge Records is a notable subsidiary label. The label changed its name in 2018 into Futura Marge.

== Roster ==
- Richard Accart
- Françoise Achard
- Pepper Adams
- Gene Adler
- Irene Aebi
- Ricou Albin
- Michel Alibo
- Kamal Alim
- Barry Altschul
- Jean-Claude André
- Jacky Arconte
- Horacee Arnold
- Patrick Artéro
- Georges Arvanitas
- Nicole Aubiat
- Jean-Jacques Avenel
- Billy Bang
- Francis Baron des grottes
- Eric Barret
- Philip Barry
- Claude Barthélémy
- Abdou Beckouri
- Fanfan Belles Cuisses
- Roquet Belles Oreilles
- Mourad Benhammou
- Abdelhaï Bennani
- Yves Berg
- Dominique Berose
- Jac Berrocal
- Michel Bertier
- Airelle Besson
- John Betsch
- Zéno Bianu
- Cyrille Bibounet
- Charly Bidineux
- François Billard
- Marvin Blackman
- Jean-Philippe Blin
- Jacques Bolognesi
- Bastien Boni
- Raymond Boni
- Maurice Bouhana
- Francky Bourlier
- Mario Branlo
- Anthony Braxton
- Willem Breuker
- Cameron Brown
- George Brown
- Marion Brown
- Rob Brown
- Kendall Buchanan
- Michel Bulteau
- Roy Burrowes
- Jaki Byard
- Jerry Byrd
- Roy Campbell Jr.
- Patrice Caratini
- Didier Carlier
- Daniel Carter
- Kent Carter
- Philippe Catan
- Jean-François Catoire
- Olivier Cauquil
- Jean-Paul Celea
- Jean-Claude Cenci
- Marc Chambon
- Alain "Paco" Charlery
- Remi Charmasson
- Jean-Louis Chautemps
- Pierre Chereze
- Brigitte Choupette
- Pierre Christophe
- Ernest Guiraud Cissé
- Curtis Clark
- Gerald Cleaver
- Jerome Cooper
- Levender Cope
- Ray Copeland
- Dominique Coster
- Pierre Courbois
- Emmanuel Cremer
- Clyde Crymer
- Bob Cunningham
- Frank Curier
- Ted Curson
- Leo Cuypers
- Andrew Cyrille
- Chris Dailey McCraven
- Dominique Dalmasso
- Irene Datcher
- Art Davis
- Richard Davis
- Charles Davis
- Santi De Briano
- Irakly de Davrichewy
- Chris de Foy
- Patrick De Groote
- Laurent de Wilde
- Raphaël Dever
- Bruno Di Goia
- Frankie Di Lagio
- Akua Dixon
- Sophia Domancich
- Laure Donnat
- Dany Doriz
- Hamid Drake
- Rémy Dédé Dréano
- Bob Driessen
- Jean-Pierre Drouet
- Daniel Dublet
- Benjamin Duboc
- Philippe Duchemin
- Johnny Dyani
- Carl Ector
- Michel Edelin
- Paco el Lobo
- Steve Ellington
- Henri-Jean Enu
- Goran Eriksson
- Olav Estienne
- Charles Eubanks
- Cheikh Tidiane Fall
- Jacques Fassola
- Roger Ferlet
- Michel Fernandez
- Glenn Ferris
- Marcus Fiorillo
- Joe Fonda
- Ricky Ford
- Jean-Marc Foussat
- Claudine François
- Laurent Geniez
- Daniel Geoffroy
- Gérard Gélas
- Patrick Géoffrois
- Denis Gheerbrandt
- Lafayette Gilchrist
- John Gilmore
- Jef Gilson
- Dexter Gordon
- Arjen Gorter
- Simon Goubert
- Jacques Gouré
- Pierre-Olivier Govin
- Enrico Granafei
- Rael Wesley Grant
- Lou Grassi
- Candice Greene
- Charles Greenlee
- Jack Gregg
- Roger Gremillot
- Sonny Grey
- Dick Griffin
- Alexandra Grimal
- Dieter Guevissier
- Jean Guérin
- Roger Guérin
- Beb Guérin
- Sylvain Guérineau
- François Guildon
- Ernest Guiraud Cissé
- Barry Guy
- Doug Hammond
- Billy Harper
- Ray Harris
- Yves Hasselmann
- Didier Hauck
- Guy Hayat
- Roy Haynes
- Eddie Henderson
- Fred Hersch
- John Hicks
- Patience Higgins
- Benoit Holliger
- Everett Hollins
- Sylvia Howard
- Bernard Hunnekink
- David Jackson
- Ambrose Jackson
- Hakim Jami
- Clifford Jarvis
- Alain Jean-Marie
- Jean-François Jenny Clark
- Terry Jenoure
- Kevin Jones
- Philly Joe Jones
- Bert Jouis
- Ray Kaczynski
- Siegfried Kessler
- Lansine Kouyaté
- Peter Kowald
- Bob Kunningham
- Thierry dit Kühl le clown
- Joachim Kühn
- Papé l' écrivain
- Christophe Laborde
- Steve Lacy
- Oliver Lake
- Didier Lasserre
- Jobic le Masson
- Fernand le salé darlès
- Fred le vicomte électrique
- Patricia Lebeugle
- Ronald Lecourt
- Benjamin Legrand
- Dominique Lentin
- Jean-Pierre Lentin
- Didier Levallet
- Victor Lewis
- Christian Lété
- Chris Lightcap
- Kirk Lightsey
- Abbey Lincoln
- Wilbur Little
- Sébastien Llado
- Guillaume Loizillon
- Frank Lowe
- Barbara Lowengreen
- Eric Löhrer
- Curtis Lundy
- Paul Lytton
- Véronique Magdelenat
- Didier Malherbe
- Fred Malle
- Gérard Marais
- Stu Martin
- Philippe Martineau
- Philippe Maté
- Art Matthews
- Ray Mauger
- Bénédicte Maulet
- Steve Mc Call
- Charles McGee
- Hirshel McGinnis
- Joe McPhee
- François Méchali
- Gilles Mézières
- Claude Micheli
- Mine
- Pépée Minègue
- Jouck Minor
- Roland Molinier
- Gato Montauban
- Matt Moran
- Pierre Moret
- Wilber Morris
- Lawrence 'Butch' Morris
- Benjamin Moussay
- David Murray
- Margriet Naber
- Gilles Naturel
- Guillaume Naturel
- Nolle Neels
- Harvey Neneux
- Marce of Mémé Flippée
- Itaru Oki
- Leïla Olivesi
- Ferhat Öz
- Evrim Özsuca
- Antoine Paganotti
- Guy Paquin
- Jeff Parker
- William Parker
- Evan Parker
- Stéphane Payen
- Sylvie Peristeris
- Walter Perkins
- Félix Perron
- Pierrick Pédron
- Barre Phillips
- Alain Pinsolle
- Michel Portal
- Steve Potts
- Jean-Claude Pourtier
- Eddie Preston
- John Purcell
- Joe Quitzke
- Boy Raaymakers
- Joseph Racaille
- Hugh Ragin
- Sha Rakotofiringa
- Alain Raman
- Roger Raspail
- Richard Raux
- Antonin Rayon
- Luc Rebelles
- Freddie Redd
- Jean-Marie Redon
- Dizzy Reece
- Wolfgang Reisinger
- Marc Richard
- Adil Riski
- Sam Rivers
- Christian Rollet
- Jean-Paul Rondepierre
- Yvon Rosillette
- Brandon Ross
- Hilton Ruiz
- Leo Sab
- Arnaud Sacase
- Mokhtar Samba
- Réda Samba
- Jacky Samson
- Maré Sanogo
- Bernard Santacruz
- Makoto Sato
- Charles Saudrais
- Julie Saury
- Emmanuel Scarpa
- Jean-Jacques Schnell
- Bruno Schorp
- John Schroder
- Jeff Yochk'o Seffer
- Jaribu Shahid
- Avery Sharpe
- Sonny Sharrock
- Archie Shepp
- Sahib Shihab
- Doug Sides
- Alan Silva
- Sonny Simmons
- Hal Singer
- Warren Smith
- Philippe Soirat
- Pierre-Yves Sorin
- James Spaulding
- Louis 'Mbiki' Spears
- Daiva Starinskaite
- Anna Startseva
- Charles Stephens
- Gil Sterg
- John Stewart
- Ricardo Strobert
- Marc Stutz-Boukouya
- Gilbert Sulma Pontoise
- John Surman
- Eric Surmenian
- Pierre Surtel
- Armand Talot Man
- Claude Talvat
- Art Taylor
- John Tchicai
- Jacques Thollot
- Malachi Thompson
- Tonton
- Jean My Truong
- Assif Tsahar
- Steve Turre
- François Tusques
- Paul Van Gysegem
- Willem Van Manen
- Maarten Van Norden
- Jasper Van't Hof
- André Velter
- Jaanika Ventsel
- Rob Verdurmen
- Patrick Vian
- Bernard Vitet
- Aly Wagué
- Freddie Waits
- Mal Waldron
- Andrea Walter
- James Ware
- Reggie Washington
- Ben Webster
- Mark Whitecage
- Barney Wilen
- Michelle Wiley
- Joe Lee Wilson
- Jan Wolf
- Chris Woods
- Reggie Workman
- Octave Z
- Michael Zerang
