= Alan Dawson =

American jazz drummer (1929–1996)

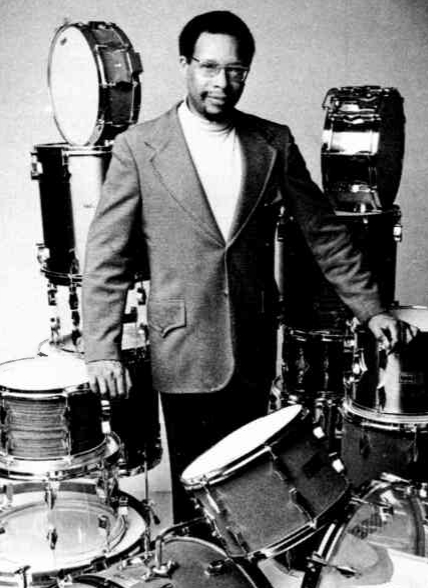
- Dawson in a 1972 DownBeat advertisement

Background information
- Born: July 14, 1929; Marietta, Pennsylvania, U.S.
- Origin: Roxbury, Boston, Massachusetts, U.S.
- Died: February 23, 1996 (aged 66)
- Genres: Jazz
- Occupation(s): Musician, teacher
- Instrument: Drums
- Years active: 1951–1996

Alan Dawson (July 14, 1929 – February 23, 1996) was an American jazz drummer and percussion teacher based in Boston.

== Biography ==
Dawson was born in Marietta, Pennsylvania and raised in Roxbury, Massachusetts. Serving in the U.S. Army during the Korean War, he played with the Army Dance Band while stationed at Fort Dix from 1951 to 1953. During his tenure, Dawson explored the post-bop era by performing with pianist Sabby Lewis. After being discharged from the army, Dawson toured Europe with Lionel Hampton.

In early 1960, he was based in Boston for a regular engagement with John Neves, bass, and Leroy Flander, piano.

Dawson was an early teacher of drummers Tony Williams and Joseph Smyth, known for his work with the Sawyer Brown country music group. Other students included Terri Lyne Carrington, Julian Vaughn, Vinnie Colaiuta, Steve Smith, Kenwood Dennard, Gerry Hemingway, Jeff Sipe, Marco Giovino, Billy Kilson, Joe Farnsworth, Bob Gullotti, Casey Scheuerell, and many others. Dawson began teaching at Berklee College of Music in 1957. He suffered a ruptured disc in 1975 which led to him halting his touring schedule, to leave Berklee and limit his teaching to his home in Lexington, Massachusetts.

Dawson's teaching style emphasized the music as a whole, rather than concentrating on percussion alone. He stressed the importance of learning the melody and structure of the tune to better fulfill the role of accompaniment. For this purpose, he had students play over standards while also singing the melody out loud. He constantly strived for balance between musical ideas and strict technique. He was big on rudiments and wrote extensive exercises intended to be practiced with brushes. He believed using brushes with his "Rudimental Ritual" would reduce stick rebound, allowing the sense of "picking up" the sticks.

While teaching, Dawson also maintained a prolific performing and recording career. Dawson was the house drummer for Lennie's on the Turnpike in Peabody, Massachusetts, from 1963 through 1970. This gig allowed him to perform with a diverse group of jazz artists. Throughout the 1960s, Dawson recorded almost exclusively with saxophonist Booker Ervin on Prestige Records. In 1968, Dawson replaced Joe Morello in the Dave Brubeck Quartet and continued until 1972. His performance credits also included stints with Bill Evans, Sonny Rollins, Jaki Byard, Sonny Stitt, Dexter Gordon, Lee Konitz, Quincy Jones, Charles Mingus, and Tal Farlow.

Dawson died of leukemia on February 23, 1996.

== Discography ==
=== As leader ===
- Waltzin' with Flo (1992)

=== As a sideman ===
With Dave Brubeck

- Dave Brubeck and Gerry Mulligan: Compadres (Columbia, 1968)
- Blues Roots (Columbia, 1968)
- The Gates of Justice (Decca, 1969)
- Brubeck/Mulligan/Cincinnati (Decca, 1970)
- Summit Sessions (Columbia, 1970)
- Live at the Berlin Philharmonie (Columbia, 1970)
- The Last Set at Newport (Atlantic, 1971)
- We're All Together Again for the First Time (Atlantic, 1973)
- All the Things We Are (Atlantic, 1973–74 [1976])

With Jaki Byard

- Jaki Byard Quartet Live! (Prestige, 1965)
- The Last from Lennie's (Prestige, 1965 [2003])
- Freedom Together! (Prestige, 1966)
- Jaki Byard with Strings! (Prestige, 1968)
- The Jaki Byard Experience (Prestige, 1968)

With Arnett Cobb

- Live at Sandy's! (Muse, 1978)

With Al Cohn

- Play It Now (Xanadu, 1975)

With Sonny Criss

- This is Criss! (Prestige, 1966)
- Portrait of Sonny Criss (Prestige, 1967)
- The Beat Goes On! (Prestige, 1968)

With Booker Ervin

- The Freedom Book (Prestige, 1963)
- The Song Book (Prestige, 1964)
- The Blues Book (Prestige, 1964)
- The Space Book (Prestige, 1964)
- Groovin' High (Prestige, 1963–64)
- The Trance (Prestige, 1965)
- Setting the Pace (Prestige, 1965) – with Dexter Gordon
- Heavy!!! (Prestige, 1966)

With Frank Foster

- Fearless Frank Foster (Prestige, 1965)
- Soul Outing! (Prestige, 1966)

With Terry Gibbs

- Bopstacle Course (Xanadu, 1974)

With Dexter Gordon

- The Panther! (Prestige, 1970)

With Gigi Gryce & Clifford Brown

- Gigi Gryce And His Big Band, Vol. 1 (Blue Note, 1954)

With Lionel Hampton

- Lionel Hampton And His Orchestra Live In Sweden (Century/Stash, 1953)

With Illinois Jacquet

- Go Power! (Cadet, 1966)
- Bottoms Up (Prestige, 1968)

With Hank Jones

- Compassion (Black & Blue, 1978)
- Bluesette (Black & Blue, 1979)

With Quincy Jones

- Jazz Abroad (EmArcy, 1955)

With Eric Kloss

- Grits & Gravy (Prestige, 1966)
- First Class Kloss! (Prestige, 1967)
- Life Force (Prestige, 1967)
- We're Goin' Up (Prestige, 1967)
- In the Land of the Giants (Prestige, 1969)

With Junior Mance

- Harlem Lullaby (Atlantic, 1967)
- I Believe to My Soul (Atlantic, 1968)

"With Charles McPherson'

- Con Alma! (Prestige, 1965)

With James Moody

- Don't Look Away Now! (Prestige, 1969)

With Houston Person

- Chocomotive (Prestige, 1967)

With Jimmy Raney

- Momentum (MPS, 1975)

With Sonny Rollins

- Live in '65 & '68 (DVD) (NAXOS, 2008)

With Sonny Stitt

- Tune-Up! (Cobblestone, 1972)

With Buddy Tate

- Live at Sandy's (Muse, 1978 [1980])
- Hard Blowin' (Muse, 1978 [1984])

With The Cryan' Shames

- Synthesis (Columbia, 1968)

With Warren Vaché Jr.

- Iridescence (Concord Jazz, 1981 [1999])

With Eddie "Cleanhead" Vinson

- Live at Sandy's (Muse, 1978 [1981])
- Hold It Right There! (Muse, 1978 [1984])

With Phil Woods

- Musique du Bois (Muse, 1974)
