= Groovin' High (Booker Ervin album) =

Studio album by Booker Ervin
- Released: April 1966
- Recorded: December 3, 1963 (#4); June 30, 1964 (#2); October 2, 1964 (#1, 3)
- Studio: Van Gelder Studio, Englewood Cliffs, NJ
- Genre: Jazz
- Length: 31:04
- Label: Prestige; PRLP 7417
- Producer: Don Schlitten

Booker Ervin chronology
The Space Book (1964)	Groovin' High (1966)	The Trance (1965)

Groovin' High is an album by American jazz saxophonist Booker Ervin featuring performances recorded in 1963 and 1964 for the Prestige label.

== Overview ==
"Stella by Starlight" was recorded on December 3, 1963, during the same session as The Freedom Book, which also includes this track. "Groovin' High" was recorded on June 30, 1964, during the same session as The Blues Book, which does not include this track. "The Second #2" and "Bass-IX" were recorded on October 2, 1964, along with tracks that appeared on The Space Book. "The Second #2" is an alternate take of "Number Two" from The Space Book, while "Bass-IX" does not appear on that album.

== Reception ==
The Allmusic review by Scott Yanow awarded the album 4½ stars and stated: "Although these performances are not quite classic, Booker Ervin fans will want this CD to round out their collections, for Ervin was at the peak of his powers during this era".

Professional ratings
Review scores
Source	Rating
Allmusic	4.5/5 stars
The Rolling Stone Jazz Record Guide	3/5 stars
The Penguin Guide to Jazz Recordings	3/4 stars

== Track listing ==
1. "The Second #2" (Ervin) - 6:36
2. "Groovin' High" (Dizzy Gillespie) - 9:53
3. "Bass-IX" (Ervin) - 11:45
4. "Stella by Starlight" (Ned Washington, Victor Young) - 2:50

== Personnel ==
- Booker Ervin - tenor saxophone
- Carmell Jones - trumpet (2)
- Jaki Byard (1, 3-4), Gildo Mahones (2), - piano
- Richard Davis - bass
- Alan Dawson - drums
