= Jimmie Smith (musician) =

American jazz drummer (1938–2024)

- Born: January 27, 1938; Newark, New Jersey, U.S.
- Died: September 17, 2024 (aged 86) Inglewood, California, US
- Genres: Jazz
- Instruments: Drums

James Howard Smith (January 27, 1938 – September 17, 2024) was an American jazz drummer.

== Early life and education ==
The cousin of Larry Young, Smith was born in Newark, New Jersey. He studied at the Al Germansky School for Drummers from 1951 to 1954 and the Juilliard School in 1959 and 1960.

== Career ==
Smith began his professional career in New York City around 1960.

In the 1960s, he played with Jimmy Forrest (1960), Larry Young (1960–62), Lambert, Hendricks, and Ross (1962–63), Pony Poindexter (1963), Jimmy Witherspoon (1963), Gildo Mahones (1963), Jimmy McGriff (1963–65), and Groove Holmes (1965).

From 1967 to 1974 he played with Erroll Garner before moving to California around 1975. He then played with: Benny Carter (1975, 1978, 1985), Sonny Criss (1975), Bill Henderson (1975, 1979), Hank Jones (1976), Ernestine Anderson (1976, 1986), Plas Johnson (1976), Phineas Newborn, Jr. (1976), Harry Edison (1976–78, with Eddie Lockjaw Davis and Zoot Sims), Lorez Alexandria (1977–78), Tommy Flanagan (1978), Terry Gibbs (1978, 1981), Bob Cooper (1979), Marshal Royal (1980), Great Guitars (1980), Barney Kessel (1981), Herb Ellis (1981), Buddy DeFranco (1981), Al Cohn (1983), Red Holloway (1987), and Dave McKenna (1988). In 1993, he toured Japan with Jimmy Smith and Kenny Burrell.

In 1977, Smith performed at the Montreux International Jazz Festival with Oscar Peterson, Eddie "Lockjaw" Davis, Ray Brown, Benny Carter, Milt Jackson, Dizzy Gillespie, and Count Basie.

Smith died on September 17, 2024, at the age of 86.

== Discography ==
With Ernestine Anderson

- Hello Like Before (Concord, 1977)
- Be Mine Tonight (Concord, 1987)

With Kenny Burrell

- Ellington Is Forever (Fantasy, 1975)
- Ellington Is Forever Volume Two (Fantasy, 1975)

With Benny Carter

- Benny Carter 4: Montreux '77 (Pablo Live, 1977)
- A Gentleman and His Music (Concord, 1985)

With Sonny Criss

- Crisscraft (Muse, 1975)
- Out of Nowhere (Muse, 1976)

With Harry Edison

- Edison's Lights (Pablo, 1976)
- Simply Sweets (Pablo, 1978) with Eddie "Lockjaw" Davis
- Just Friends (Pablo, 1978 [1980]) with Zoot Sims

With Tommy Flanagan

- Something Borrowed, Something Blue (Galaxy, 1978)

With Jimmy Forrest

- Forrest Fire (New Jazz, 1960)

With Dizzy Gillespie

- Dizzy Gillespie Jam (Pablo, 1977)

With Richard "Groove" Holmes

- Soul Message (Prestige, 1965)
- Misty (Prestige, 1965)

With Milt Jackson

- Feelings (Pablo, 1976)

With Etta Jones

- Love Shout (Prestige, 1963)

With Hank Jones

- Jones-Brown-Smith (Concord Jazz, 1976) with Ray Brown
- Rockin' in Rhythm (Concord Jazz, 1977) with Ray Brown

With Barney Kessel

- Jelly Beans (Concord, 1981)

With Lambert, Hendricks & Bavan

- Havin' a Ball at the Village Gate (RCA, 1963)
- At Newport '63 (RCA, 1963)

With Gildo Mahones

- I'm Shooting High (Prestige, 1963)
- The Great Gildo (Prestige, 1964)

With Jimmy McGriff

- Jimmy McGriff at the Organ (Sue, 1964)
- Blues for Mister Jimmy (Sue, 1965)

With Phineas Newborn, Jr.

- Look Out - Phineas Is Back! (Pablo, 1976 [1978])

With Pony Poindexter

- Pony Poindexter Plays the Big Ones (New Jazz, 1963)
- Gumbo! (Prestige, 1963) with Booker Ervin

With Jimmy Witherspoon

- Baby, Baby, Baby (Prestige, 1963)

With Larry Young

- Testifying (New Jazz, 1960)
- Young Blues (New Jazz, 1960)
- Groove Street (Prestige, 1962)
