= Back from the Gig =

Studio album by Booker Ervin
- Released: 1976
- Recorded: February 15, 1963 and May 24, 1968
- Genre: Jazz
- Length: 85:04
- Label: Blue Note

Booker Ervin chronology
The In Between (1968)	Back from the Gig (1976)

Back from the Gig is a double LP by American jazz saxophonist Booker Ervin featuring performances recorded in 1963 and 1968 but not released on the Blue Note label until 1976. The earlier session was later released in 1988 as originally intended under Horace Parlan's name as Happy Frame of Mind and the later session was finally released in 2005 as Tex Book Tenor.

== Reception ==
The Allmusic review by Scott Yanow awarded the album 4½ stars and stated "The stimulating group originals and advanced solos (which fall somewhere between hard bop and the avant-garde) still sound fresh and frequently exciting".

Professional ratings
Review scores
Source	Rating
Allmusic	4.5/5 stars

== Track listing ==
All compositions by Booker Ervin except as indicated

Side One

1. "Home Is Africa" (Ronnie Boykins) – 8:46
2. "A Tune for Richard" – 6:06
3. "Back from the Gig" (Horace Parlan) – 5:52

Side Two

1. "Dexi" (Johnny Coles) – 5:54
2. "Kuchenza Blues" (Randy Weston) – 5:39
3. "Happy Frame of Mind" (Horace Parlan) – 6:13

Side Three

1. "Gichi" (Kenny Barron) – 7:27
2. "Den Tex" – 7:38
3. "In A Capricornian Way" (Woody Shaw) – 5:52

Side Four

1. "Lynn's Tune" – 6:16
2. "204" – 10:21
  - Recorded at Rudy Van Gelder Studio, Englewood Cliffs, NJ on February 15, 1963 (Side One and Side Two) and June 24, 1968 (Side Three and Side Four).

== Personnel ==
- Booker Ervin – tenor saxophone
- Kenny Barron (Side Three and Side Four), Horace Parlan (Side One and Side Two) – piano
- Johnny Coles (Side One and Side Two), Woody Shaw (Side Three and Side Four) – trumpet
- Grant Green – guitar (Side One and Side Two, tracks 1 & 3)
- Jan Arnet (Side Three and Side Four), Butch Warren (Side One and Side Two) – bass
- Billy Higgins – drums
