= Jay Hawk Talk =

Studio album by Carmell Jones
- Released: 1965
- Recorded: May 8, 1965; RLA Sound, New York City
- Genre: Jazz
- Length: 38:15
- Label: Prestige; PRLP 7401
- Producer: Don Schlitten

Professional ratings
Review scores
Source	Rating
Allmusic	4/5 stars
The Penguin Guide to Jazz Recordings	3/4 stars
DownBeat	4.5/5 stars

Jay Hawk Talk is the third studio album by trumpeter Carmell Jones. Recorded and released in 1965, it was Jones' debut on Prestige and his final album as a leader.

== Track listing ==
All compositions by Carmell Jones, unless otherwise noted

1. "Jay Hawk Talk" - 5:51
2. "Willow Weep for Me" (Ann Ronell) - 4:57
3. "What Is This Thing Called Love?" (Cole Porter) - 8:57
4. "Just in Time" (Jules Styne, Betty Comden, Adolph Green) - 5:34
5. "Dance of the Night Child" - 6:38
6. "Beepdurple" - 6:18

== Personnel ==
- Carmell Jones - trumpet
- Jimmy Heath - tenor saxophone
- Barry Harris - piano
- George Tucker - bass
- Roger Humphries - drums
