= On the Spur of the Moment (Horace Parlan album) =

Studio album by Horace Parlan
- Released: 1961
- Recorded: March 18, 1961
- Genre: Jazz
- Length: 56:32
- Label: Blue Note
- Producer: Alfred Lion

Horace Parlan chronology
Headin' South (1960)	On the Spur of the Moment (1961)	Up & Down (1961)

On the Spur of the Moment is an album by American jazz pianist Horace Parlan featuring performances recorded and released on the Blue Note label in 1961.

== Reception ==
The Allmusic review by Stephen Thomas Erlewine awarded the album 4 stars and stated: "There are a few ballads, and even when things are at their hottest, Parlan's understated playing is a cue for the group to keep it tasteful, but that relaxed atmosphere is part of the reason why On the Spur of the Moment is another winning effort from the underrated pianist."

Professional ratings
Review scores
Source	Rating
Allmusic	4/5 stars

== Track listing ==
All compositions by Horace Parlan except as indicated

1. "On the Spur of the Moment" - 5:52
2. "Skoo Chee" (Booker Ervin) - 10:55
3. "And That I Am So in Love" (Harold Ousley) - 5:04
4. "Al's Tune" (Ervin) - 7:02
5. "Ray C." (Leon Mitchell) - 6:45
6. "Pyramid" (Roger Williams**) - 6:28
7. "On the Spur of the Moment" [alternate take] - 7:55 Bonus track on CD reissue
8. "Pyramid" [alternate take] (Williams) - 6:31 Bonus track on CD reissue

- Recorded at Rudy Van Gelder Studio, Englewood Cliffs, NJ on March 18, 1961
(**) Jazz pianist from Pittsburgh, not the pop pianist who had a fifties hit with "Autumn Leaves."

== Personnel ==
- Horace Parlan - piano
- Tommy Turrentine - trumpet
- Stanley Turrentine - tenor saxophone
- George Tucker - bass
- Al Harewood - drums
