= Tex Book Tenor =

Studio album by Booker Ervin
- Released: 2005
- Recorded: June 24, 1968
- Studio: Van Gelder Studio, Englewood Cliffs, NJ
- Genre: Jazz
- Length: 37:34
- Label: Blue Note
- Producer: Francis Wolff

Booker Ervin chronology
The In Between (1968)	Tex Book Tenor (2005)

Tex Book Tenor is an album by American jazz saxophonist Booker Ervin featuring the last performances Ervin recorded as a leader in 1968 for the Blue Note label. The session was first released in 1976 as a double LP Back from the Gig combined with a 1964 session recorded under Horace Parlan's leadership (released in 1988 as Happy Frame of Mind) and finally released in 2005 on CD.

== Reception ==
The Allmusic review by Thom Jurek awarded the album 4 stars and stated "This is a wonderful addition not only to the Blue Note catalog on CD, but to Ervin's own shelf as well, and should be picked up by anyone interested in him as a bandleader and composer".

Professional ratings
Review scores
Source	Rating
Allmusic	4/5 stars
The Penguin Guide to Jazz Recordings	4/4 stars

== Track listing ==
All compositions by Booker Ervin except as noted

1. "Gichi" (Kenny Barron) - 7:27
2. "Den Tex" - 7:38
3. "In a Capricornian Way" (Woody Shaw) - 5:52
4. "Lynn's Tune" - 6:16
5. "204" - 10:21
- Recorded at Rudy Van Gelder Studio, Englewood Cliffs, NJ on June 24, 1968.

== Personnel ==
- Booker Ervin - tenor saxophone
- Kenny Barron - piano
- Woody Shaw - trumpet
- Jan Arnet - bass
- Billy Higgins - drums
