= Carmell Jones =

American jazz trumpeter (1936–1996)

Background information
- Born: July 19, 1936; Kansas City, Kansas, United States
- Died: November 7, 1996 (aged 60) Kansas City, Kansas, United States
- Genres: Jazz, hard bop
- Instrument: Trumpet
- Years active: 1961–1991
- Labels: Pacific Jazz, Prestige

Carmell Jones (July 19, 1936 – November 7, 1996) was an American jazz trumpet player.

== Biography ==
Jones was born in Kansas City, Kansas, United States. He started piano lessons at age five, and trumpet lessons at age seven. His first professional work was with Kansas City musicians Nathan Davis, Cleanhead Vinson and Frank Smith. He moved to California in 1961, and worked as a studio musician for several years, including in the orchestras for two movie soundtracks, Seven Days In May and The Manchurian Candidate, the latter starring Frank Sinatra. He released two albums as a leader for Pacific Jazz at this time while recording as a sideman with Bud Shank, Onzy Matthews, Curtis Amy, Harold Land, and Gerald Wilson.

He toured with Horace Silver in 1964–65, and was on Silver's seminal 1965 Blue Note album Song for My Father. In 1965, he moved to Germany where he lived for 15 years, working with Paul Kuhn and the SFB Big Band (Sender Freies Berlin) from 1968 to 1980. There he worked with musicians such as Milo Pavlovic, Herb Geller, Leo Wright, Rudi Wilfer and Eugen Cicero. Jones returned to the US in 1980, working as a teacher and appearing at local clubs in Kansas City. He released one additional album as a leader in 1982 entitled Carmell Jones Returns, on the Revelation label. Jones died of heart failure on November 7, 1996, in Kansas City at the age of 60. He was survived by his musical family including his wife Christine Jones and daughter Stella Jones.

In 2003, Mosaic released a three-CD set of Jones material.

== Discography ==
=== As leader ===
- The Remarkable Carmell Jones (Pacific Jazz, 1961)
- Brass Bag with Tricky Lofton (Pacific Jazz, 1962)
- Business Meetin' (Pacific Jazz, 1962)
- Jay Hawk Talk (Prestige, 1965)
- Returns (Revelation, 1983)
- Carmell Jones Quartet: Previously unreleased Los Angeles Session (Fresh Sound, 2015)

=== As sideman ===
With Gerald Wilson

- You Better Believe It! (Pacific Jazz, 1961)
- Moment of Truth (Pacific Jazz, 1962)
- Portraits (Pacific Jazz, 1964)
- On Stage (Pacific Jazz, 1965)

With others

- Curtis Amy, Groovin' Blue (Pacific Jazz, 1961)
- Nathan Davis The Hip Walk (SABA, 1965)
- Booker Ervin, The Blues Book (Prestige, 1965)
- Booker Ervin, Groovin' High (Prestige, 1966)
- Victor Feldman, Soviet Jazz Themes (Äva, 1963)
- Paul Kuhn, The Big Hits of the Big Bands (Columbia/EMI 1972)
- Paul Kuhn, The Big Band Beatles (EMI, 1977)
- Harold Land, Jazz Impressions of Folk Music (Imperial, 1963)
- Jim Mair, 8th & Central (JMP, 1991)
- Herbie Mann, Latin Mann (Columbia, 1965)
- Charles McPherson, Bebop Revisited! (Prestige, 1965)
- Red Mitchell-Harold Land Quintet, Hear Ye! (Atlantic, 1962)
- Mombasa, Tathagata (Wind, 1980)
- Oliver Nelson, Berlin Dialogue for Orchestra (Flying Dutchman, 1971)
- Jean-Luc Ponty, More Than Meets the Ear (World Pacific, 1968)
- Vi Redd, Birdcall (United Artists, 1962)
- Annie Ross & Pony Poindexter, Recorded at the Tenth German Jazz Festival in Frankfurt (SABA, 1966)
- Bud Shank, Barefoot Adventure (Pacific Jazz, 1961)
- Bud Shank, New Groove (Pacific Jazz, 1961)
- Horace Silver, Song for My Father (Blue Note, 1965)
- Horace Silver, Live 1964 (Emerald, 1984)
- Sarah Vaughan, Sarah Sings Soulfully (Roulette/Blue Note, 1992)
- Tim Whitmer, Humorous Intentions (Canyon Don, 1991)
- Nancy Wilson, Yesterday's Love Songs/Today's Blues (Capital, 1963)
- Jimmy Woods, Conflict (Contemporary, 1963)
- Leo Wright, It's All Wright (BASF, 1973)
