= New Groove =

New Groove may refer to:

- New Groove (Bud Shank album), 1961
- New Groove (Groove Holmes album), 1974

== See also ==
- The New Groove: The Blue Note Remix Project, a 1996 Blue Note Records remix compilation album
