= Chino Pozo =

Francisco "Chino" Pozo (October 4, 1915, Havana – April 28, 1980, New York City) was a Cuban drummer.

Pozo claimed to be the cousin of Chano Pozo, though this has been disputed. He was an autodidact on piano and bass, but concentrated on bongos, congas, and drums. He moved to the United States in 1937, and played with Machito from 1941 to 1943 and with the Jack Cole Dancers from 1943 to 1949. Following this he played in numerous jazz ensembles, especially latin jazz and Afro-Cuban jazz; his credits include work with Jose Curbelo, Noro Morales, Tito Puente, Tito Rodríguez, Enric Madriguera, Perez Prado, Josephine Premice, Tadd Dameron, Charlie Parker, and Dizzy Gillespie. He toured with Peggy Lee in 1954–55 and played with Stan Kenton (1955), Herbie Mann (1956), Xavier Cugat (1959), and René Touzet (1959). He also recorded with Illinois Jacquet, Phineas Newborn, Gábor Szabó, and Paul Anka.

== Discography ==
- Justo Betancourt, Pa Bravo Yo (Fania, 1972)
- Harry Betts, The Jazz Soul of Doctor Kildare (Choreo, 1962)
- Dizzy Gillespie, The Ebullient Mr. Gillespie (Verve, 1959)
- Peggy Lee, Basin Street East Proudly Presents Miss Peggy Lee Recorded at the Fabulous New York Club (Capitol, 1961)
- Peggy Lee, Mink Jazz (Capitol, 1963)
- Fats Navarro, The Fabulous Fats Navarro Vol. 2 (Blue Note, 1957)
- Phineas Newborn Jr., Plays Harold Arlen's Music from Jamaica (RCA Victor, 1957)
- Chico O'Farrill, Married Well (Verve, 1967)
- Eddie Palmieri, Justice (Tico, 1969)
- Johnny Richards, Aqui Se Habla Espanol (Roulette, 1967)
- A. K. Salim, Pretty for the People (Savoy, 1957)
- Gabor Szabo, Gypsy '66 (Impulse!, 1965)
- Billy Taylor, Billy Taylor with Four Flutes (Riverside, 1959)
- Clark Terry & Chico O'Farrill, Spanish Rice (Impulse!, 1966)
- Julius Watkins and Charlie Rouse, Mood in Scarlet (Dawn, 1957)
- Julius Watkins and Charlie Rouse, The Jazz Modes (Atlantic, 1959)
