= George Tucker (musician) =

American jazz musician

George Andrew Tucker (December 10, 1927, in Palatka, Florida – October 10, 1965, in New York City) was an American jazz double-bassist.

== Career ==
Tucker studied bass at the New York Conservatory of Modern Music in the late 1940s. Early in his career, he played with Earl Bostic, John Coltrane, and Jackie McLean. He worked in the house bands of several lauded New York jazz venues, such as the Continental Lounge, The Playhouse, and Minton's; he played with Eric Dolphy, Clifford Jordan, Horace Parlan, Booker Ervin, Jerome Richardson, and Junior Mance during this time. In 1958, he recorded with Melba Liston on her jazz classic, Melba Liston and Her 'Bones. In 1960–61 he recorded with Stanley Turrentine, Parlan, Ervin, Dexter Gordon, and Shirley Scott, and in 1962–63 he toured with the trio of Dave Lambert, John Hendricks and Yolande Bavan. Near the end of his life Tucker recorded with Coleman Hawkins and Jaki Byard.

George Tucker died from a cerebral hemorrhage while performing with guitarist Kenny Burrell.

== Discography ==
=== As sideman ===
With Jaki Byard

- Jaki Byard Quartet Live! (Prestige, 1965)
- The Last from Lennie's (Prestige, 1965 [2003])

With Ted Curson

- Ted Curson Plays Fire Down Below (Prestige, 1962)

With Walt Dickerson

- To My Queen (New Jazz, 1962)
- Walt Dickerson Plays Unity (Audio Fidelity, 1964)

With Eric Dolphy

- Outward Bound (Prestige, 1960)
- Here and There (Prestige, 1966)

With Booker Ervin

- The Book Cooks (Bethlehem, 1960)
- Cookin' (Savoy, 1960)
- That's It! (Candid, 1961)

With Curtis Fuller

- Jazz ...It's Magic! (Regent, 1957)
- Curtis Fuller Volume 3 (Blue Note, 1957)
- Two Bones (Blue Note, 1958)

With Dexter Gordon

- Doin' Allright (Blue Note, 1961)

With Bennie Green

- Back on the Scene (Blue Note, 1958)
- Walkin' & Talkin' (Blue Note, 1959)

With Slide Hampton

- Slide Hampton and His Horn of Plenty (Strand, 1959)

With John Handy

- In the Vernacular (Roulette, 1958)

With Willis Jackson

- Neapolitan Nights (Prestige, 1962)
- Boss Shoutin' (Prestige, 1964)

With Etta Jones

- Love Shout (Prestige, 1963)

With Clifford Jordan

- Cliff Craft (Blue Note, 1957)

With Lambert, Hendricks & Bavan

- Havin' a Ball at the Village Gate (RCA, 1963)
- At Newport '63 (RCA, 1963)

With Melba Liston

- Melba Liston and Her 'Bones (MetroJazz, 1958)

With Gildo Mahones

- I'm Shooting High (Prestige, 1963)
- The Great Gildo (Prestige, 1964)

With Junior Mance

- That's Where It Is! (Capitol, 1965)

With Charles McPherson

- Con Alma! (Prestige, 1965)

With Jackie McLean

- Fat Jazz (Jubilee, 1958)

With Oliver Nelson

- Taking Care of Business (New Jazz, 1960)

With Horace Parlan

- Us Three (Blue Note, 1960)
- Speakin' My Piece (Blue Note, 1960)
- Headin' South (Blue Note, 1960)
- On the Spur of the Moment (Blue Note, 1961)
- Up & Down (Blue Note, 1961)

With Dave Pike

- Dave Pike Plays the Jazz Version of Oliver! (Moodsville, 1963)

With Pony Poindexter

- Pony Poindexter Plays the Big Ones (New Jazz, 1963)
- Gumbo! (Prestige, 1963) with Booker Ervin

With Sonny Red

- The Mode (Jazzland (1961)
- Images (Jazzland, 1961)

With Freddie Redd

- San Francisco Suite (Riverside, 1957)

With Jerome Richardson

- Roamin' with Richardson (New Jazz, 1959)

With Shirley Scott

- The Shirley Scott Trio (Moodsville, 1960)
- Satin Doll (Prestige, 1961 [1963])
- Hip Twist (Prestige, 1961)

With Zoot Sims

- Down Home (Bethlehem, 1960)

With Johnny "Hammond" Smith

- All Soul (New Jazz, 1959)
- That Good Feelin' (New Jazz, 1959)
- Talk That Talk (New Jazz, 1960)

With Buddy Tate

- Groovin' with Buddy Tate (Swingville, 1961)

With Lucky Thompson

- Lucky Thompson Plays Happy Days Are Here Again (Prestige, 1965)

With Stanley Turrentine

- Look Out! (Blue Note, 1960)
- Comin' Your Way (Blue Note, 1961)
- Up at "Minton's" (Blue Note, 1961)
- Jubilee Shout!!! (Blue Note, 1961)

With Jimmy Witherspoon

- Baby, Baby, Baby (Prestige, 1963)

With Jimmy Woods

- Conflict (Contemporary, 1963)
