= Pony Poindexter Plays the Big Ones =

Studio album by Pony Poindexter
- Released: 1963
- Recorded: January 31, 1963
- Studio: Van Gelder Studio, Englewood Cliffs, NJ
- Genre: Jazz
- Label: New Jazz; NJLP 8285
- Producer: Ozzie Cadena

Pony Poindexter chronology
| Pony's Express (1962) | Pony Poindexter Plays the Big Ones (1963) | Gumbo! (1963) |

Pony Poindexter Plays the Big Ones is an album by saxophonist Pony Poindexter which was released on the New Jazz label in 1963.

== Reception ==
Professional ratings
Review scores
| Source | Rating |
|---|---|
| Allmusic | 4/5 stars |

Allmusic awarded the album 4 stars.

== Track listing ==
1. "Midnight in Moscow" (Kenny Ball) - 4:16
2. "Moon River" (Henry Mancini, Johnny Mercer) - 4:38
3. "Twistin' USA" (Kal Mann) - 4:49
4. "Poinciana" (Nat Simon, Buddy Bernier) - 3:23
5. "Love Me Tender" (Vera Matson, Elvis Presley) - 5:09
6. "Green Eyes" (Nilo Menéndez, Adolfo Utrera, Eddie Rivera, Eddie Woods) - 3:01
7. "Fly Me to the Moon" (Bart Howard) - 4:07
8. "San Antonio Rose" (Bob Wills) - 3:04

== Personnel ==
- Pony Poindexter - alto saxophone, soprano saxophone
- Gildo Mahones - piano
- George Tucker - bass
- Jimmie Smith - drums
