= Two Bones =

Studio album by Curtis Fuller
- Released: 1980
- Recorded: January 22, 1958
- Studio: Van Gelder Studio, Hackensack
- Genre: Jazz
- Length: 39:13
- Label: Blue Note; GXF-3064
- Producer: Alfred Lion

Curtis Fuller chronology
Curtis Fuller Volume 3 (1957)	Two Bones (1980)	Monday Night at Birdland (1958)

Two Bones is an album by American trombonist Curtis Fuller with fellow trombonist Slide Hampton recorded in 1958. It was not released until the Japanese King Records label issued it in 1980 under license. The session (plus additional alternate takes) was finally released in the U.S. as part of the Mosaic Records box set The Complete Blue Note/UA Curtis Fuller Sessions in 1996.

== Track listing ==
All compositions by Curtis Fuller except as indicated

1. "Fuss Budget" - 7:44
2. "Oatmeal Cookie" - 4:37
3. "Da-Baby" - 7:31
4. "Pajama Tops" - 5:35
5. "Slide's Ride" (Slide Hampton) - 3:57
6. "Loquacious Lady" - 4:09
7. "Mean Jean" - 5:40

== Personnel ==
- Curtis Fuller, Slide Hampton – trombone
- Sonny Clark – piano
- George Tucker – bass
- Al Harewood – drums
