= Heavy!!! =

Studio album by The Booker Ervin Sextet
- Released: 1967
- Recorded: September 9, 1966; Impact Studios, New York City
- Genre: Jazz
- Length: 46:17 CD reissue
- Label: Prestige; PRLP 7499
- Producer: Don Schlitten

Booker Ervin chronology
| Setting the Pace (1965) | Heavy!!! (1967) | Structurally Sound (1966) |

Heavy!!! is an album by American jazz saxophonist Booker Ervin featuring performances recorded in 1966 for the Prestige label.

== Reception ==
The Allmusic review by Scott Yanow awarded the album 4 stars and stated "The set matches Ervin with a remarkable rhythm section... The music is quite moody, soulful, and explorative yet not forbidding".

Professional ratings
Review scores
| Source | Rating |
|---|---|
| Allmusic | 4/5 stars |
| The Rolling Stone Jazz Record Guide | 4/5 stars |
| The Penguin Guide to Jazz Recordings | 3/4 stars |

== Track listing ==
1. "Bächafillen" (Garnett Brown) - 8:15
2. "You Don't Know What Love Is (Don Raye, Gene de Paul) - 8:43
3. "Aluminum Baby" (Jaki Byard) - 5:00
4. "Not Quite That" (Brown) - 7:54
5. "Bei Mir Bist du Schoen" (Sholom Secunda, Jacob Jacobs, Sammy Cahn, Saul Chaplin) - 12:28
6. "Ode to Charlie Parker" (Byard) - 3:57 Bonus track on CD reissue

== Personnel ==
- Booker Ervin - tenor saxophone
- Jimmy Owens - trumpet (3,4,5,6), flugelhorn (1)
- Garnett Brown - trombone (1,3,4,5,6)
- Jaki Byard - piano
- Richard Davis - bass
- Alan Dawson - drums
