= The Space Book =

Studio album by Booker Ervin
- Released: October 1965
- Recorded: October 2, 1964
- Studio: Van Gelder Studio, Englewood Cliffs, NJ
- Genre: Post-bop, free jazz
- Length: 35:36
- Label: Prestige; PRLP 7386
- Producer: Don Schlitten

Booker Ervin chronology
| The Blues Book (1964) | The Space Book (1965) | Groovin' High (1963-64) |

The Space Book is an album by American jazz saxophonist Booker Ervin featuring performances recorded in 1964 for the Prestige label, with his quartet including Jaki Byard on piano, Richard Davis on bass, and Alan Dawson on drums.

== Reception ==
The Allmusic review by Scott Yanow awarded the album 4½ stars and stated: "This CD is a fine example of Booker Ervin's unique style".

Professional ratings
Review scores
| Source | Rating |
|---|---|
| Allmusic | 4.5/5 stars |
| The Rolling Stone Jazz Record Guide | 5/5 stars |
| The Penguin Guide to Jazz Recordings | 3.5/4 stars |

== Track listing ==
All compositions by Booker Ervin except as noted

1. "Number Two" - 8:18
2. "I Can't Get Started" (Vernon Duke, Ira Gershwin) - 9:40
3. "Mojo" - 10:29
4. "There Is No Greater Love" (Isham Jones, Marty Symes) - 7:09

== Personnel ==
- Booker Ervin - tenor saxophone
- Jaki Byard - piano
- Richard Davis - bass
- Alan Dawson - drums
