= Núria Feliu =

Spanish Catalan singer (1941–2022)

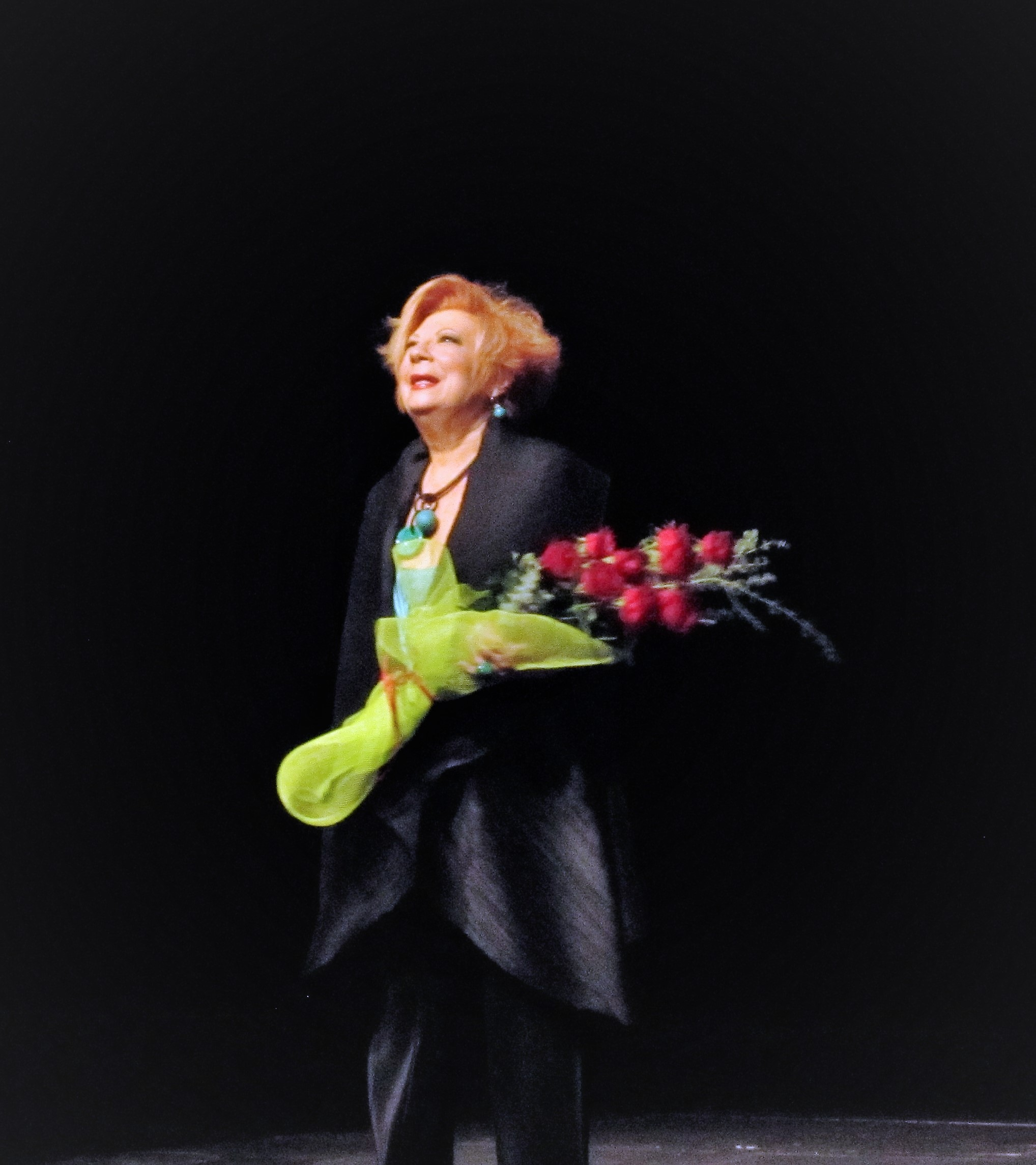
- Feliu in 2011

Background information
- Born: 21 September 1941; Sants, Barcelona, Spain
- Died: 22 July 2022 (aged 80) Barcelona, Catalonia, Spain
- Genres: Jazz, folk
- Instrument: Vocals
- Years active: 1964–2005
- Website: nuriafeliu.cat

Núria Feliu i Mestres (21 September 1941 – 22 July 2022) was a Spanish Catalan singer and actress, a singular figure of the Nova Cançó movement.

== Career ==
Feliu was born on 21 September 1941 in the Barcelona neighbourhood of Sants, a neighborhood where she lived her entire life. There she made her earliest theatrical performances; she was part of the "Agrupació Dramàtica de Barcelona" and participated in several children's choirs in the neighborhood. She made her debut as a singer in 1964 with the group "Els Quatre Gats". Feliu released her first two albums the following year, Anirem tots cap al cel and Gent, with American songs covered in Catalan and soon became part of the Nova Cançó movement.

She was discovered by the composer Antoni Ros-Marbà, who promoted her career until 1966, when Feliu entered the world of jazz and began to collaborate with Tete Montoliu, becoming the first jazz singer in Catalan. They then released an LP with Erich Peter, Billy Brooks and Booker Ervin, and in 1997 a compilation album with the title Tete Montoliu-Núria Feliu, 1965–1990 was published.

From 1991 onwards, her appearances on stage were sporadic. In 1992, she made a cameo for an episode of the TV3 sitcom "Teresina S.A.". She also participated in other programs such as Hora once (1970), Quitxalla (1980), Malalts de tele (1999, 1992) and Herois quotidians (2008), and in films such as El vicari d'Olot (1981), Puta misèria! (1989) and Any de Gràcia (2011). Her book Vols ballar? 93 cançons i ballables, a compilation of songs from all periods, was published in 1995.

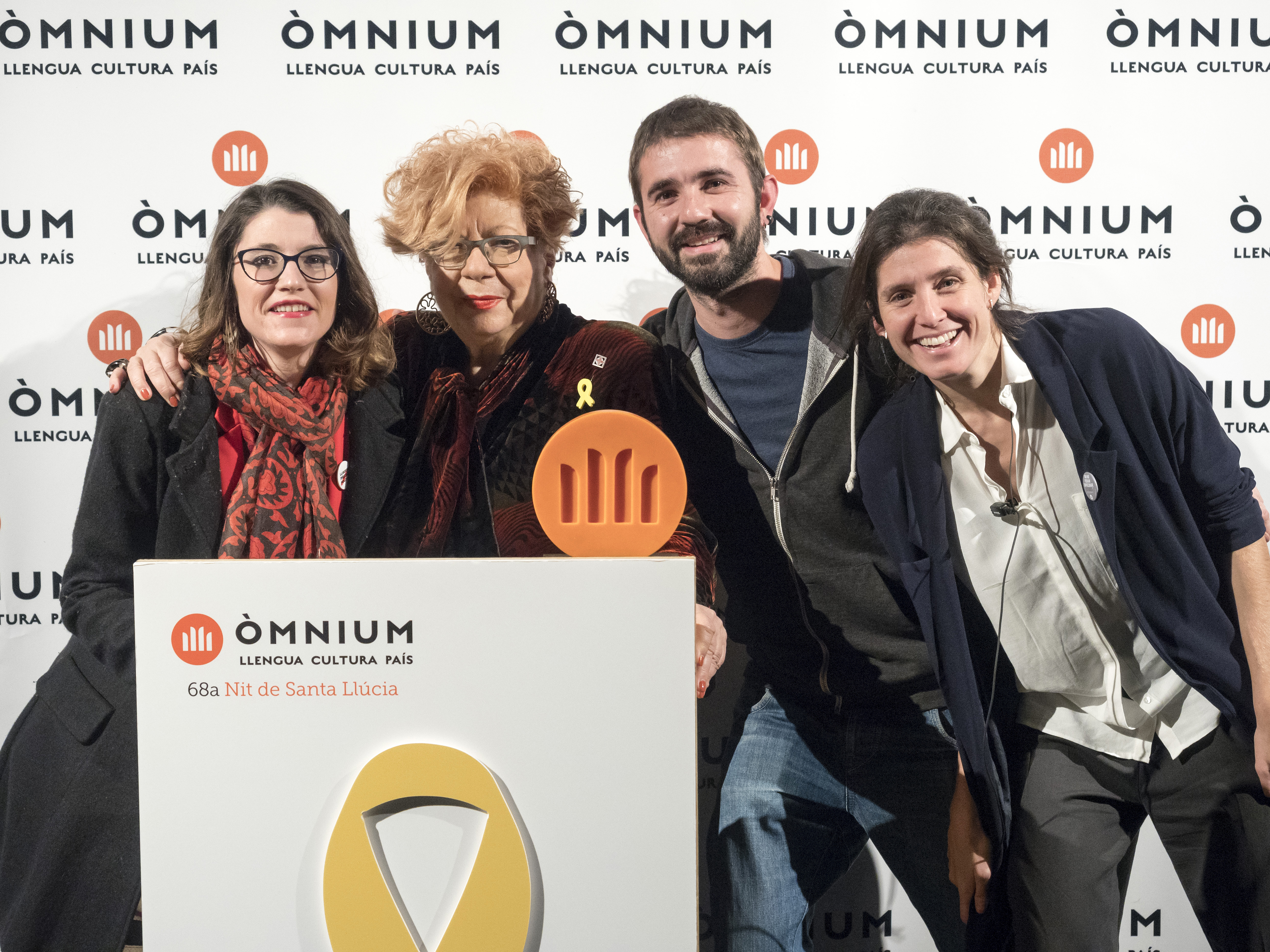
Feliu in 2018

She retired in 2005, with 50 albums and more than 400 songs recorded.

In 2007, she published a book-disc compiling the most popular Catalan sardanas, and in 2011, she celebrated her 50 years as a singer with a concert at the Liceu, where several artists participated. In 2016, she published the memoirs Dies i records d'infantesa.

One of her last public appearances took place in November 2020, on the TV3 program Al cotxe, during which she stated that "I have not sung for the sake of singing, I have sung for the people" (Jo no he cantat per cantar, he cantat per a la gent) and that she felt satisfied with her musical career.

Feliu sang not only in the jazz music genre, but also popular Catalan songs, boleros, cuplés and sardanes. She also covered songs by Joan Manuel Serrat.

== Personal life and death ==
Feliu never married and never had children. Her brother Albert was her manager throughout her artistic career.

She was in favor of the independence of Catalonia, of the "yes" vote in the 2017 Catalan independence referendum and participated in the main mobilizations of the sovereigntist entities.

Feliu's health deteriorated during the COVID-19 pandemic; she had pneumonia and shingles and did not leave her home for a year. In early 2021 she suffered a stroke, and she died in Barcelona on 22 July 2022, at the age of 80, due to subsequent complications. The Catalan government and the press called her an "indispensable icon" of Catalonia for her popularity among the public and for being a reference of Catalan music.

== Awards ==
- "Trofeu de l'any" of Ràdio Barcelona to the best singer (1966)
- Award of the Ministry of Culture to the best traditional song record for Cançons d'Apel-les Mestres (1976)
- Medal of the Cercle Català de Madrid (1979)
- Best album of the year by Ràdio 4 for Viure a Barcelona (1979)
- Creu de Sant Jordi (1985)
- "Dia de la Sardana" Award of the Obra del Ballet Popular (1989)
- Sant Jordi Award for the diffusion of cinematographic music (1990)
- SGAE Award to the diffusion of songwriters (1990)
- Ramon Aramon i Serra Award for language loyalty (1995)
- "Fill de Sants" Award (1995)
- Jaume I de la Franja de Ponent Award (2001)
- Medal for Civic Merit of the Obra del Ballet Popular (2001)
- Altaveu Honorary Award to the trajectory (2005)
- "Enderrock" Honorary Award (2020)

== Discography ==
- Núria Feliu amb Tete Montoliu (1965)
- Núria Feliu amb Lou Bennett i els seus amics (1966), with Lou Bennett
- Mai no goses (1967)
- Senzillament (1968)
- El cuplet a Barcelona (1970)
- Homenatge a Mistinguett (1971)
- Núria de nit (1972)
- El retaule del flautista (1972)
- Te per tots (1973)
- Cançons que m’agraden (1973)
- Cuplets tradicionals catalans (1974)
- Cinema ranci ... cinema d’avui (1974)
- Núria Feliu i Los Guacamayos (1975)
- Cançons d’Apel·les Mestres (1976)
- El cant del poble (1977)
- I les gavines seran de paper de xarol (1978)
- La comèdia musical catalana (1979) with Mary Santpere
- Viure a Barcelona (1981)
- Més que mai (1985), with José Carreras
- Cançons d’entreguerres del 18 al 39 (1986)
- Els Oscars de la Feliu (1989)
- Amb cor i ànima (1989)
- Núria Feliu 25 anys (1990)
- Us ho devia (1994)
- Per raons sentimentals (1996)
- Amb un aire country (2002)
- Núria Feliu: 40 anys (2005)
- Les sardanes més populars (2007)

== Appearances in literature and audiovisual media ==
The traditional Catalan song "El vestir d'en Pasqual", interpreted by Núria Feliu, is referenced in popular culture. For instance, in the Catalan edition of the comic book Tintin in Tibet by Hergé, the character Captain Haddock sings this song at the end of the story, as the protagonists return from their journey in Tibet, thus introducing a Catalan cultural element into the Tintin universe.

Feliu was also the subject of the documentary El swing de la Feliu, broadcast by TV3 on 27 July 2024. Directed by Mireia Mallol, the film provides an intimate portrait of the artist, including testimonies from musicians, friends and family members, as well as archive footage and concert clips. The documentary explores her influence on contemporary Catalan music.

The documentary is available on the official platform of the Catalan broadcaster 3cat.
