= Melba Liston and Her 'Bones =

Studio album by Melba Liston
- Released: 1959
- Recorded: December 22 & 24, 1958
- Studio: New York City
- Genre: Jazz
- Length: 33:54
- Label: MetroJazz; E 1013
- Producer: Leonard Feather

Melba Liston chronology
Melba Liston and Her 'Bones (1959)	Volcano Blues (1993)

Melba Liston and Her 'Bones is the sole album led by trombonist, arranger and composer Melba Liston, recorded for the MetroJazz label in 1958.

== Reception ==
Professional ratings
Review scores
Source	Rating
All About Jazz	4.5/5 stars
AllMusic	4/5 stars
The Encyclopedia of Popular Music	3/5 stars
The Penguin Guide to Jazz Recordings	3/4 stars
Tom Hull – on the Web	A−

The All About Jazz review by Hrayr Attarian states: "The leader's interplay with the other trombone players adds to the musical richness of the recording. Even in the company of high-quality, accomplished master musicians like these, her musical skills stand out. Her lyrical improvisations are melodic, clear and gay when she plays unmuted, and mysterious and warm when muted. This recording is one of the few places to hear Melba Liston solo".

The authors of The Penguin Guide to Jazz Recordings wrote: "there's much to enjoy and it's a feast for trombone lovers."

A reviewer for Billboard described the album as "a fine new set," and commented: "The arrangements are fresh and modern, and the work... is mighty listenable."

Critic Tom Hull awarded the album a grade of "A−", calling it "a real delight."

== Track listing ==
1. "Blues Melba" (Melba Liston) – 6:33
2. "The Trolley Song" (Hugh Martin, Ralph Blane) – 2:30
3. "Pow!" (Leonard Feather) – 4:04
4. "Wonder Why" (Nicholas Brodszky, Sammy Cahn) – 4:03
5. "Christmas Eve" (Slide Hampton) – 5:00
6. "What's My Line Theme" (Granville 'Sascha' Burland) – 4:24
7. "You Don't Say" (Melba Liston) – 3:57
8. "The Dark Before the Dawn" (Hampton, Feather) – 3:23

== Personnel ==
- Melba Liston – trombone, arranger
- Jimmy Cleveland (tracks 3–6 & 8), Bennie Green (tracks 1, 2 & 7), Al Grey (tracks 1, 2 & 7), Benny Powell (tracks 1, 2 & 7), Frank Rehak (tracks 3–6 & 8) – trombone
- Slide Hampton – trombone, tuba, arranger (tracks 3–6 & 8)
- Ray Bryant – piano (tracks 3–6 & 8)
- Kenny Burrell – guitar (tracks 1, 2 & 7)
- Jamil Nasser (tracks 1, 2 & 7), George Tucker (tracks 3–6 & 8) – bass
- Frankie Dunlop (tracks 3–6 & 8), Charlie Persip (tracks 1, 2 & 7) – drums
