= The Trance (album) =

Studio album by Booker Ervin
- Released: October 1967
- Recorded: October 27, 1965
- Genres: Jazz, post-bop
- Length: 41:24
- Label: Prestige
- Producer: Don Schlitten

Booker Ervin chronology
Groovin' High (1964)	The Trance (1967)	Setting the Pace (1966)

The Trance is an album by American jazz saxophonist Booker Ervin featuring performances recorded in 1965 for the Prestige label, with Jaki Byard on piano, Reggie Workman on bass, and Alan Dawson on drums.

== Reception ==
The Allmusic review by Al Campbell awarded the album 4 stars and stated: "Ervin's inspired exploratory tenor flights are consistently stirring, punctuated with piercing blues. The Trance delivers further documentation of Ervin's endless tenor inventiveness".

Professional ratings
Review scores
Source	Rating
Allmusic	4/5 stars
The Rolling Stone Jazz Record Guide	3/5 stars
The Penguin Guide to Jazz Recordings	3/4 stars

== Track listing ==
All compositions by Booker Ervin except as indicated

1. "The Trance" – 19:39
2. "Speak Low" (Ogden Nash, Kurt Weill) – 15:09
3. "Groovin' at the Jamboree" – 6:38

- Recorded in Munich, Germany on October 27, 1965.

== Personnel ==
- Booker Ervin – tenor saxophone
- Jaki Byard – piano
- Reggie Workman – bass
- Alan Dawson – drums
