= Cookin' (Booker Ervin album) =

Studio album by Booker Ervin
- Released: May 1961
- Recorded: November 26, 1960
- Genre: Jazz
- Length: 43:14
- Label: Savoy

Booker Ervin chronology
The Book Cooks (1960)	Cookin' (1961)	That's It! (1961)

Cookin' is an album by American jazz saxophonist Booker Ervin featuring performances recorded in 1960 for the Savoy label.

== Reception ==
The AllMusic review awarded the album 4½ stars.

Professional ratings
Review scores
Source	Rating
AllMusic	4.5/5 stars
The Penguin Guide to Jazz Recordings	3/4 stars

== Track listing ==
All compositions by Booker Ervin except as indicated

1. "Dee Da Do" – 7:32
2. "Mr. Wiggles" – 5:19
3. "You Don't Know What Love Is" (Gene de Paul, Don Raye) – 7:25
4. "Down In the Dumps" – 6:14
5. "Well, Well" – 9:53
6. "Autumn Leaves" (Joseph Kosma, Johnny Mercer, Jacques Prévert) – 7:01
- Recorded in Newark, New Jersey on November 26, 1960.

== Personnel ==
- Booker Ervin – tenor saxophone
- Richard Williams – trumpet
- Horace Parlan – piano
- George Tucker – bass
- Dannie Richmond – drums
