= Julius Watkins Sextet =

Studio album by Julius Watkins
- Released: 1995
- Recorded: August 8, 1954, and March 20, 1955
- Studio: Van Gelder (Hackensack, New Jersey)
- Genre: Jazz
- Length: 41:50
- Label: Blue Note
- Producer: Alfred Lion

Julius Watkins chronology
Julius Watkins Sextet (1995)	Les Jazz Modes (1957)

Julius Watkins Sextet is an album by the French horn player Julius Watkins featuring tracks recorded in 1954 and 1955 which were originally released as two 10 inch LPs (BLP 5053, 5064) on the Blue Note label. The original 12 inch LP (K18P-9273) was released in Japan on June 25, 1983, by King Records (Japan), who owned the Blue Note license in Japan at that time.

== Reception ==
Allmusic awarded the album 4½ stars stating: "The French horn might be a difficult instrument, but Watkins played it with the warmth of a trombone and nearly the fluidity of a trumpet. All nine straight-ahead selections on his CD are group originals, with Duke Jordan's future standard "Jordu" being heard in one of its earliest versions. Overall, the music fits into the modern mainstream of the period. This early effort by Julius Watkins is easily recommended".

Professional ratings
Review scores
Source	Rating
Allmusic	4.5/5 stars

== Track listing ==
All compositions by Julius Watkins except where noted.

1. "Linda Delia" (George Butcher) - 5:18
2. "Perpetuation" - 5:06
3. "I Have Known" - 4:25
4. "Leete" - 4:50
5. "Garden Delights" - 4:43
6. "Julie Ann" - 3:32
7. "Sparkling Burgundy" - 4:15
8. "B and B" - 4:57
9. "Jordu" (Duke Jordan) - 4:44

== Personnel ==
- Julius Watkins - French horn
- Frank Foster (tracks 1–4), Hank Mobley (tracks 5–9) - tenor saxophone
- George Butcher (tracks 1–4), Duke Jordan (tracks 5–9) - piano
- Perry Lopez - guitar
- Oscar Pettiford - bass
- Art Blakey (tracks 5–9), Kenny Clarke (tracks 1–4) - drums
