= Barefoot Adventure =

Soundtrack album by Bud Shank
- Released: 1961
- Recorded: November 1961; Los Angeles, CA
- Genre: Jazz
- Label: Pacific Jazz; PJ 35

Bud Shank chronology
New Groove (1961)	Barefoot Adventure (1961)	Bossa Nova Jazz Samba (1962)

Barefoot Adventure is a soundtrack album of music from Bruce Brown's 1961 surf film of the same name. All the music was composed by saxophonist Bud Shank, performed by him with a small jazz combo, and released on the Pacific Jazz label.

== Reception ==
Professional ratings
Review scores
Source	Rating
AllMusic	3/5 stars

AllMusic rated the album with 3 stars.

== Track listing ==
All compositions by Bud Shank

1. "Barefoot Adventure" - 4:12
2. "Shoeless Beach Meeting" - 4:06
3. "Jungle Cruise" - 4:43
4. "How High the Makaha" - 3:10
5. "Well, 'Pon My Soul" - 4:14
6. "Ala Moana" - 2:15
7. "Bruce Is Loose" - 3:24
8. "Dance of the Sea Monsters" - 4:06

== Personnel ==
- Bud Shank - alto saxophone, baritone saxophone
- Carmell Jones - trumpet
- Bob Cooper - tenor saxophone
- Dennis Budimir - guitar
- Gary Peacock - bass
- Shelly Manne - drums
