= Les Jazz Modes =

Studio album by Julius Watkins and Charlie Rouse
- Released: 1957
- Recorded: June 12, 1956; New York City
- Genre: Jazz
- Label: Dawn; DLP-1108
- Producer: Chuck Darwin

Charlie Rouse chronology
Jazzville Vol. 1 (1956)	Les Jazz Modes (1957)	Mood in Scarlet (1957)

Julius Watkins chronology
Julius Watkins Sextet (1955)	Les Jazz Modes (1957)	Mood in Scarlet (1957)

Les Jazz Modes is an album by Les Jazz Modes, a group led by French horn player Julius Watkins and saxophonist Charlie Rouse. The album was recorded in 1956 and released on the Dawn label. The album was released on CD with additional tracks from Jazzville Vol. 1 (Dawn, 1956) and Modern Jazz Festival (Jazztone, 1956)

== Reception ==
Professional ratings
Review scores
Source	Rating
AllMusic	4/5 stars
The Penguin Guide to Jazz	3/4 stars

AllMusic awarded the album 4 stars.

== Track listing ==
All compositions by Julius Watkins except as indicated, all arrangements by Julius Watkins.

1. "Dancing on the Ceiling" (Lorenz Hart, Richard Rodgers) – 2:26 Bonus track on CD reissue
2. "Legend" (Gildo Mahones) – 3:17 Bonus track on CD reissue
3. "Temptations" (Nacio Herb Brown, Arthur Freed) – 3:57 Bonus track on CD reissue
4. "Episode" – 2:05 Bonus track on CD reissue
5. "Dancing in the Dark" (Howard Dietz, Arthur Schwartz) – 2:05 Bonus track on CD reissue
6. Goodbye" (Gordon Jenkins) – 3:41 Bonus track on CD reissue
7. "Town and Country" (Varon) – 4:16
8. "When the Blues Come On" (Al Cohn, Charles Isaiah Darwin) – 4:15
9. "Blue Modes" – 4:30
10. "You Are Too Beautiful" (Hart, Rodgers) – 3:43
11. "So Far" (Oscar Hammerstein II, Rodgers) – 2:56
12. "Idle Evening" – 4:16
13. "Garden Delights" – 5:28
14. "Strange Tale" – 4:30
15. "Two Songs" – 3:13
16. "Stallion" (Mahones) – 3:04 Bonus track on CD reissue

== Personnel ==
- Julius Watkins – French horn
- Charlie Rouse – tenor saxophone
- Gildo Mahones – piano
- Paul West (tracks 1–6), Paul Chambers (tracks 7–10, 13, 15 & 16), Oscar Pettiford (tracks 11, 12 & 14) – bass
- Art Taylor (tracks 1–6), Ron Jefferson (tracks 7–16) – drums
- Janet Putnam – harp (tracks 8 & 10)
- Eileen Gilbert – vocals (tracks 8, 10 & 14)
