= Jimmy Woods =

American saxophonist

Jimmy Woods (born October 29, 1934, in St. Louis, Missouri; died March 29, 2018, in Anchorage, Alaska) was an American jazz alto saxophonist.

Woods played with the R&B band of Homer Carter in 1951, and served in the Air Force from 1952 to 1956. He played with Roy Milton after his discharge, and was with Horace Tapscott in 1960 and Joe Gordon in 1961. Following this he played with Gerald Wilson (1963) and Chico Hamilton (1964–1965).

Woods is remembered primarily for two albums he released on Contemporary Records in the early 1960s. The second of these albums, Conflict, featured Elvin Jones, Harold Land, Carmell Jones, Andrew Hill, and George Tucker.

== Discography ==
=== As a leader ===
- Awakening!! (Contemporary, 1962)
- Conflict (Contemporary, 1963)

=== As sideman ===
With Chico Hamilton

- Chic Chic Chico (Impulse, 1965)
- The Dealer (Impulse!, 1966)

With Gerald Wilson

- Portraits (Pacific Jazz, 1964)
- The Golden Sword (Pacific Jazz, 1966)

With others

- Teddy Edwards, Back to Avalon (Contemporary, 1995) – rec. 1960
- Joe Gordon, Lookin' Good! (Contemporary, 1961)
