= Booker 'n' Brass =

Studio album by Booker Ervin
- Released: January 1968
- Recorded: September 12, 1967
- Genre: Jazz
- Length: 49:07
- Label: Pacific Jazz
- Producer: Richard Bock

Booker Ervin chronology
Structurally Sound (1966)	Booker 'n' Brass (1968)	The In Between (1968)

Booker 'n' Brass is an album by American jazz saxophonist Booker Ervin featuring performances recorded in 1967 for the Pacific Jazz label.

== Reception ==
The Allmusic review by Michael G. Nastos awarded the album 3½ stars and stated: "To hear Booker Ervin as the leading solo voice on a recording with a larger ensemble is a treat, not only for his fans, but for those interested in modern big-band sounds grown from the bop era that are flavored with urban blues".

Professional ratings
Review scores
Source	Rating
Allmusic	3.5/5 stars
The Penguin Guide to Jazz Recordings	4/4 stars

== Track listing ==
1. "East Dallas Special" (Booker Ervin) - 4:37
2. "Salt Lake City" (Johnny Lange, Leon René) - 4:22
3. "Do You Know What It Means to Miss New Orleans?" (Louis Alter, Edgar DeLange) - 4:28
4. "L.A. After Dark" [Master - Take 6] (Teddy Edwards) - 5:03
5. "Kansas City" (Jerry Leiber, Mike Stoller) - 3:00
6. "Baltimore Oriole" (Hoagy Carmichael, Paul Francis Webster) - 4:42
7. "Harlem Nocturne" (Earle Hagen, Dick Rogers) - 4:18
8. "I Left My Heart in San Francisco" (George Cory, Douglass Cross) - 4:13
9. "St. Louis Blues" (W. C. Handy) - 4:11
10. "L.A. After Dark" [Alternate Take 3] (Edwards) - 5:08 Bonus track on CD reissue
11. "L.A. After Dark" [Alternate Take 7] (Edwards) - 5:05 Bonus track on CD reissue
  - Recorded at Webster Hall in New York City on September 12 (tracks 4, 6 & 9–11), September 13 (tracks 1, 2 & 5), and September 14 (tracks 3, 7 & 8), 1967.

== Personnel ==
- Booker Ervin - tenor saxophone
- Martin Banks (tracks 1–3, 5, 7 & 8), Johnny Coles (tracks 1, 2 & 5), Ray Copeland, Freddie Hubbard (tracks 3, 4 & 6–11), Charles Tolliver (tracks 4, 6 & 9–11), Richard Williams - trumpet
- Garnett Brown (tracks 3, 4 & 6–11), Bennie Green, Britt Woodman (tracks 1, 2 & 5) - trombone
- Benny Powell (tracks 1–3, 5, 7 & 8) - bass trombone
- Kenny Barron - piano
- Reggie Johnson - bass
- Lenny McBrowne - drums
- Teddy Edwards - arranger, conductor
