= Conflict (Jimmy Woods album) =

Studio album by Jimmy Woods
- Released: 1963
- Recorded: March 25–26, 1963; Los Angeles, California
- Genre: Jazz
- Length: 38:42
- Label: Contemporary; M 3612/S7612
- Producer: Lester Koenig

Jimmy Woods chronology
Awakening!! (1962)	Conflict (1963)

Conflict is an album by alto saxophonist Jimmy Woods' Sextet featuring Elvin Jones, which was recorded in 1963 and released on the Contemporary label.

== Reception ==
Professional ratings
Review scores
Source	Rating
AllMusic	4/5 stars
The Penguin Guide to Jazz Recordings	3.5/4 stars

AllMusic awarded the album 4 stars with a review by Scott Yanow stating: "While all of the soloists are impressive and Jones' powerful drumming fuels the horn players, the leader's adventurous alto sax is not to be missed".

== Track listing ==
All compositions by Jimmy Woods

1. "Conflict" – 5:45
2. "Coming Home" – 6:00
3. "Aim" – 7:55
4. "Apart Together" – 6:43
5. "Look to Your Heart" – 5:49
6. "Pazmuerte" – 6:30
7. "Conflict" [alternate take 5] – 4:50 Bonus track on CD reissue
8. "Aim" [alternate take 43] – 7:10 Bonus track on CD reissue
9. "Look to Your Heart" [alternate take 39] – 5:50 Bonus track on CD reissue

== Personnel ==
- Jimmy Woods – alto saxophone
- Carmell Jones – trumpet
- Harold Land – tenor saxophone
- Andrew Hill – piano
- George Tucker – bass
- Elvin Jones – drums
