= Setting the Pace =

Studio album by Booker Ervin with Dexter Gordon
- Released: December 1966
- Recorded: October 27, 1965; Munich, West Germany
- Genre: Jazz
- Length: 41:36
- Labels: Prestige; PR 7455
- Producer: Don Schlitten

Booker Ervin chronology
The Trance (1965)	Setting the Pace (1966)	Heavy!!! (1966)

Dexter Gordon chronology
Gettin' Around (1966)	Setting the Pace (1966)	Stella by Starlight (1965)

Professional ratings
Review scores
Source	Rating
Allmusic	4.5/5 stars
The Rolling Stone Jazz Record Guide	3/5 stars
The Penguin Guide to Jazz Recordings	3.5/4 stars

Setting the Pace is an album by saxophonists Dexter Gordon and Booker Ervin recorded in Munich in 1965 and released on the Prestige label.

== Reception ==
The Allmusic review stated "Although Gordon is in good form, Ervin (who sometimes takes the music outside) wins honors".

== Track listing ==
1. "Setting the Pace" (Dexter Gordon) – 19:09
2. "Dexter's Deck" (Dexter Gordon) – 22:47
3. "The Trance" (Booker Ervin) – 19:37
4. "Speak Low" (Weil-Nash) – 15:06

Tracks 3 and 4 were added to the 1992 digital remaster of "Setting The Pace"; originally released on "The Trance"

== Personnel ==
- Booker Ervin, Dexter Gordon – tenor saxophone
- Jaki Byard – piano
- Reggie Workman – bass
- Alan Dawson – drums

Recorded in Munich, Germany. October 27, 1965. Digital remastering, 1992 by Phil De Lancie
