= Awakening!! =

Studio album by Jimmy Woods
- Released: 1962
- Recorded: September 13, 1961, and February 19, 1962
- Studio: Los Angeles
- Genre: Jazz
- Length: 41:37
- Label: Contemporary; M 3605/S7605
- Producer: Lester Koenig

Jimmy Woods chronology
Awakening!! (1962)	Conflict (1963)

Awakening!! is an album by alto saxophonist Jimmy Woods which was recorded in late 1961 and early 1962 and released on the Contemporary label.

== Reception ==
Professional ratings
Review scores
Source	Rating
Allmusic	4.5/5 stars
The Penguin Guide to Jazz Recordings	3/4 stars

Allmusic awarded the album 4½ stars with its review by Scott Yanow stating: "Jimmy Woods' original sound and passionate, chance-taking style make one wonder why he was never able to really make it; his music has not really dated".

== Track listing ==
All compositions by Jimmy Woods except as indicated

1. "Awakening" - 4:10
2. "Circus" (Louis Alter, Bob Russell) - 4:25
3. "Not Yet" - 7:59
4. "A New Twist" - 3:40
5. "Love for Sale" (Cole Porter) - 6:42
6. "Roma" - 5:15
7. "Little Jim" - 5:48
8. "Anticipation" - 4:01
- Recorded in Los Angeles, California, on September 13, 1961, (tracks 1, 2, 4, 5 & 8) and February 19, 1962 (tracks 3, 6 & 7)

== Personnel ==
- Jimmy Woods - alto saxophone
- Martin Banks, Joe Gordon - trumpet (tracks 1, 2, 4, 5 & 8)
- Amos Trice (tracks 1, 2, 4, 5 & 8), Dick Whittington (tracks 3, 6 & 7) - piano
- Jimmy Bond (tracks 1, 2, 4, 5 & 8), Gary Peacock (tracks 3, 6 & 7) - bass
- Milt Turner - drums
