= The Jazz Modes =

Studio album by Julius Watkins and Charlie Rouse
- Released: 1959
- Recorded: October 28, 1957, and November 20, 1958; New York City
- Genre: Jazz
- Label: Atlantic; LP 1306
- Producer: Nesuhi Ertegun

Charlie Rouse chronology
The Most Happy Fella (1958)	The Jazz Modes (1959)	Takin' Care of Business (1960)

Julius Watkins chronology
The Most Happy Fella (1958)	The Jazz Modes (1959)	French Horns for My Lady (1962)

The Jazz Modes is an album by horn player Julius Watkins and saxophonist Charlie Rouse recorded in 1957 and 1958 and released on the Atlantic label.

== Reception ==
The AllMusic review by Michael G. Nastos awarded the album 4 stars and stated: "This, just short of 40 total minutes of bold, jazz-based creative sounds, is definitely recommended."

Professional ratings
Review scores
Source	Rating
AllMusic	4/5 stars

== Track listing ==
All compositions by Julius Watkins except as indicated

1. "The Oblong" – 5:43
2. "1-2-3-4-0 in Syncopation" – 3:52
3. "Blue Flame" – 4:02
4. "Mood in Motion" – 5:38
5. "Knittin'" (Charlie Rouse) – 6:24
6. "This 'N' That" (Rouse) – 5:28
7. "Glad That I Found You" – 2:37
8. "Princess" – 4:35

== Personnel ==
- Julius Watkins – French horn
- Charlie Rouse – tenor saxophone
- Sahib Shihab – baritone saxophone (tracks 1, 2, 4 & 6)
- Gildo Mahones – piano
- Martin Rivera – bass
- Ron Jefferson (tracks 3, 5, 7 & 8), Jimmy Wormworth (tracks 1, 2, 4 & 6) – drums
- Chino Pozo – congas, bongos (tracks 3, 5, 7 & 8)
- Eileen Gilbert – vocals (tracks 3, 7 & 8)
