= The Song Book =

Studio album by Booker Ervin
- Released: July 1964
- Recorded: February 27, 1964
- Studio: Van Gelder Studio, Englewood Cliffs, NJ
- Genre: Jazz
- Length: 38:23
- Label: Prestige; PRLP 7318
- Producer: Don Schlitten

Booker Ervin chronology
The Freedom Book (1963)	The Song Book (1964)	The Blues Book (1964)

The Song Book is an album by American jazz saxophonist Booker Ervin featuring performances recorded in 1964 for the Prestige label.

== Reception ==
The Allmusic review by Scott Yanow awarded the album 4 stars and stated " Ervin and his quartet come up with fresh interpretations of the warhorses. Booker Ervin never sounded like anyone else".

Professional ratings
Review scores
Source	Rating
Allmusic	4/5 stars
The Rolling Stone Jazz Record Guide	4/5 stars
The Penguin Guide to Jazz Recordings	3.5/4 stars

== Track listing ==
1. "The Lamp Is Low" (Peter de Rose, Mitchell Parish, Maurice Ravel, Bert Shefter) - 7:16
2. "Come Sunday" (Duke Ellington) - 5:39
3. "All the Things You Are" (Oscar Hammerstein II, Jerome Kern) - 5:21
4. "Just Friends" (John Klenner, Sam M. Lewis) - 5:56
5. "Yesterdays" (Otto Harbach, Jerome Kern) - 7:44
6. "Love Is Here to Stay" (George Gershwin, Ira Gershwin) - 6:27

== Personnel ==
- Booker Ervin - tenor saxophone
- Tommy Flanagan - piano
- Richard Davis - bass
- Alan Dawson - drums
