= That's It! =

Studio album by Booker Ervin
- Released: 1961
- Recorded: January 6, 1961
- Genre: Jazz
- Length: 43:16
- Label: Candid

Booker Ervin chronology
Cookin' (1960)	That's It! (1961)	Exultation! (1963)

That's It! is an album by American jazz saxophonist Booker Ervin featuring performances recorded in 1961 for the Candid label.

== Reception ==
The contemporaneous DownBeat reviewer, Ira Gitler, commented that the album was Ervin's best work up to that time. The AllMusic review by Scott Yanow awarded the album 4½ stars and stated: "Booker Ervin, who always had a very unique sound on the tenor, is heard in prime form on his quartet set".

Professional ratings
Review scores
Source	Rating
AllMusic	4.5/5 stars
DownBeat	4/5 stars
The Penguin Guide to Jazz Recordings	3.5/4 stars

== Track listing ==
All compositions by Booker Ervin except as indicated

1. "Mojo" - 7:57
2. "Uranus" - 4:32
3. "Poinciana" (Buddy Bernier, Nat Simon) - 8:04
4. "Speak Low" (Ogden Nash, Kurt Weill) - 7:12
5. "Booker's Blues" - 10:59
6. "Boo" - 4:32

- Recorded at Nola Penthouse Studios in New York City on January 6, 1961.

== Personnel ==
- Booker Ervin - tenor saxophone
- Horace Parlan - piano
- George Tucker - bass
- Al Harewood - drums
