= I'm Shooting High (Gildo Mahones album) =

Studio album by Gildo Mahones
- Released: 1964
- Recorded: February 4, August 15 and September 3, 1963
- Studio: Van Gelder Studio, Englewood Cliffs
- Genre: Jazz
- Label: Prestige; PR 16004
- Producer: Ozzie Cadena

Gildo Mahones chronology
I'm Shooting High (1964)	The Great Gildo (1965)

Professional ratings
Review scores
Source	Rating
AllMusic	3/5 stars

I'm Shooting High is an album by jazz pianist Gildo Mahones recorded for the Prestige label in 1963. The album was intended to be the pianist's debut album but was shelved temporarily when the Prestige subsidiary label New Jazz ceased to be used for releases and was later issued as part of the Prestige 16000 Series.

== Track listing ==
All compositions by Gildo Mahones except where noted.

1. "Water Blues Fall"
2. "Good Morning Heartache" (Irene Higginbotham, Ervin Drake, Dan Fisher)
3. "The Sweetest Sounds" (Richard Rodgers)
4. "Stormy Monday" (Earl Hines, Billy Eckstine, Bob Crowder)
5. "I'm Shooting High" (Jimmy McHugh, Ted Koehler)
6. "Bali Ha'i" (Richard Rodgers, Oscar Hammerstein II)
7. "Tales of Brooklyn"
8. "Hey Girl" (Gerry Goffin, Carole King)

Recorded at Van Gelder Studio in Englewood Cliffs, New Jersey on February 4, 1963 (tracks 5, 6), August 15, 1963 (tracks 7, 8) and September 3, 1963 (tracks 1–4)

== Personnel ==
- Gildo Mahones – piano
- Leo Wright – alto saxophone (tracks 7, 8)
- Kenny Burrell – guitar (tracks 7, 8)
- Larry Young – organ (tracks 5, 6)
- Peck Morrison (tracks 5, 6), George Tucker (tracks 1–4, 7, 8) – bass
- Oliver Jackson (tracks 5, 6), Jimmie Smith (tracks 1–4, 7, 8) – drums
- Ozzie Beck – vocals (track 8)
- Ozzie Cadena – producer
- Rudy Van Gelder – recording engineer
