= Curtis Fuller, Volume 3 =

Studio album by Curtis Fuller
- Released: December 1960
- Recorded: December 1, 1957
- Studio: Van Gelder Studio; Hackensack, NJ
- Genre: Jazz
- Length: 38:49
- Label: Blue Note; BLP 1583
- Producer: Alfred Lion

Curtis Fuller chronology
Jazz ...It's Magic! (1957)	Curtis Fuller, Volume 3 (1960)	Two Bones (1958)

Curtis Fuller, Volume 3 is an album by American jazz trombonist Curtis Fuller recorded on December 1, 1957 but not released on Blue Note until late 1960. The quintet features trumpeter Art Farmer and rhythm section Sonny Clark, George Tucker and Louis Hayes.

== Reception ==
Professional ratings
Review scores
Source	Rating
AllMusic	3/5 stars

The AllMusic review by Lee Bloom states, "This third solo recording for Fuller on the Blue Note label is stronger than its predecessors, especially in showcasing the trombonist's writing talents... This recording firmly established Curtis Fuller as a serious, mature voice on his instrument."

== Track listing ==
All tracks are written by Curtis Fuller, except as noted.

Side 1
No.	Title	Length
1.	"Little Messenger"	6:21
2.	"Quantrale"	6:13
3.	"Jeanie"	6:49

Side 2
No.	Title	Writer(s)	Length
1.	"Carvon"		6:59
2.	"Two Quarters of a Mile"		6:33
3.	"It's Too Late Now"	Burton Lane; Alan Jay Lerner	6:54

== Personnel ==
=== Musicians ===
- Curtis Fuller – trombone
- Art Farmer – trumpet
- Sonny Clark – piano
- George Tucker – bass
- Louis Hayes – drums

=== Technical personnel ===
- Alfred Lion – producer
- Rudy Van Gelder – recording engineer, mastering
- Francis Wolff – photography
- Nat Hentoff – liner notes
