= Simply Sweets =

Studio album by Harry Edison and Eddie "Lockjaw" Davis
- Released: 1978
- Recorded: September 22, 1977
- Studio: Group IV Recording Studios, Hollywood, CA
- Genre: Jazz
- Length: 45:31
- Label: Pablo; 2310 806
- Producer: Norman Granz

Harry Edison chronology
Edison's Lights (1976)	Simply Sweets (1978)	Just Friends (1980)

Eddie "Lockjaw" Davis chronology
Eddie "Lockjaw" Davis 4 – Montreux '77 (1977)	Simply Sweets (1978)	The Heavy Hitter (1979)

Simply Sweets is an album by trumpeter Harry Edison with saxophonist Eddie "Lockjaw" Davis, recorded in 1977 and released by the Pablo label the following year.

== Reception ==
Professional ratings
Review scores
Source	Rating
AllMusic	4/5 stars
The Penguin Guide to Jazz Recordings	2.5/4 stars

The Bay State Banner wrote that "the bright comps and nifty solos of pianist Dolo Coker spice up the session, but the rhythm section work is very basic—sort of all let's wrap this up and pick up the union check-caliber."

AllMusic reviewer Scott Yanow stated: "Trumpeter Harry "Sweets" Edison and tenor saxophonist Eddie "Lockjaw" Davis always made a potent pair. They both possessed immediately identifiable sounds, were veterans of Count Basie's Orchestra and never had any difficulty swinging. The repertoire of this Edison album is not too creative ... However, the playing of the principals holds one's interest throughout".

== Track listing ==
All compositions by Harry Edison except where noted

1. "Dirty Butt Blues" – 6:36
2. "Feelings" (Morris Albert) – 5:21
3. "One for the Count" – 5:27
4. "My Ideal" (Richard A. Whiting, Leo Robin, Newell Chase) – 5:42
5. "Simply Sweets" – 4:24
6. "Opus Funk" – 6:52
7. "Lax" – 3:19
8. "Miz Kitty's Blues" – 7:50

== Personnel ==
- Harry Edison – trumpet
- Eddie "Lockjaw" Davis – tenor saxophone
- Dolo Coker – piano
- Harvey Newmark – bass
- Jimmie Smith – drums
