= Gildo Mahones =

American jazz pianist (1929–2018)

- Born: Hermenengildo Mahones; June 2, 1929; New York City, New York, United States
- Died: April 27, 2018 (aged 88)
- Genres: Jazz
- Occupation: Musician
- Instrument: Piano

Hermenengildo "Gildo" Mahones (June 2, 1929, New York City – April 27, 2018) was an American jazz pianist.

== Biography ==
Mahones was born to Puerto Rican parents in East Harlem in New York City. Early in his career, he played with Joe Morris (1948) and Milt Jackson. Mahones served in the Army, and then played with Lester Young from 1953 to 1956. Later in the 1950s Mahones toured with the Jazz Modes (which included Charlie Rouse and Julius Watkins), Sonny Stitt, and Benny Green. From 1959 to 1964 Mahones played behind Lambert, Hendricks & Ross.

When Lambert, Hendricks & Ross broke up, Mahones moved to Los Angeles, where he worked both as a studio musician and as a jazz sideman. He led his own trio and appeared on recordings by O. C. Smith, Lou Rawls, James Moody, Harold Land and Blue Mitchell, Leon Thomas, Jim Hall, Big Joe Turner, Lorez Alexandria, Benny Carter, Pony Poindexter, Booker Ervin, and Jimmy Witherspoon.

Mahones died on April 27, 2018, aged 88.

== Discography ==
=== As leader ===
- I'm Shooting High (Prestige, 1963)
- The Great Gildo (Prestige, 1963–64)
- Gildo Mahones Trio (Interplay, 1990)

=== As sideman ===
With Kenny Burrell

- Bluesy Burrell (Moodsville, 1963)

With Bill Cosby

- Badfoot Brown & the Bunions Bradford Funeral & Marching Band (Uni, 1971)
- Bill Cosby Presents Badfoot Brown & the Bunions Bradford Funeral Marching Band (Sussex, 1972)

With Ted Curson

- Ted Curson Plays Fire Down Below (Prestige, 1962)

With Booker Ervin

- The Blues Book (Prestige, 1964)
- Groovin' High (Prestige, 1963–64)

With Bennie Green

- Walkin' & Talkin' (Blue Note, 1959)

With Jon Hendricks

- A Good Git-Together (Pacific Jazz, 1959)

With Willis Jackson

- Neapolitan Nights (Prestige, 1962)

With Lambert, Hendricks & Ross

- The Hottest New Group in Jazz (Columbia, 1960)

With Lambert, Hendricks & Bavan

- At Basin Street East (RCA Victor, 1963)
- At Newport '63 (RCA Victor, 1963)
- Havin' a Ball at the Village Gate (RCA Victor, 1963)

With Pony Poindexter

- Pony's Express (Epic, 1962)
- Pony Poindexter Plays the Big Ones (New Jazz, 1963)
- Gumbo! (Prestige, 1963) with Booker Ervin

With Charlie Rouse

- We Paid Our Dues (CBS, 1961; Rouse tracks only, album shared with Seldon Powell)

With Sonny Stitt

- Sonny Stitt with Strings: A Tribute to Duke Ellington (Catalyst, 1977)

With Julius Watkins and Charlie Rouse

- Les Jazz Modes (Dawn, 1957)
- Mood in Scarlet (Dawn, 1957)
- The Most Happy Fella (Atlantic, 1958)
- The Jazz Modes (Atlantic, 1959)

With Frank Wess

- Yo Ho! Poor You, Little Me (Prestige, 1963)

With Jimmy Witherspoon

- Baby, Baby, Baby (Prestige, 1963)
- Blue Spoon (Prestige, 1964)
