= Koto & Flute =

Studio album by Kimio Eto and Bud Shank
- Released: 1960
- Recorded: 1960; Los Angeles, CA
- Genre: World music
- Label: World Pacific; WP 1299
- Producer: Richard Bock

Bud Shank chronology
Slippery When Wet (1959)	Koto & Flute (1960)	New Groove (1961)

Koto & Flute is an album by koto player Kimio Eto with flautist Bud Shank released on the World Pacific label.

== Reception ==
Professional ratings
Review scores
Source	Rating
AllMusic	4/5 stars

In a review for AllMusic, Ken Dryden states: "fans of traditional Japanese music and those familiar with Shank's jazz recordings will enjoy this gorgeous album".

== Track listing ==
1. "Haru No Umi (Suite) Part 1: Haru No Umi" (Michio Miyagi)
2. "Haru No Umi (Suite) Part 2: Haru No Otozure" (Miyagi)
3. "Haru No Umi (Suite) Part 3: Tanima No Suisha" (Miyagi)
4. "Joyo Kaze" (Kimio Eto)
5. "March" (Tokichi Setoguchi)
6. "Chi Doi" (Kengyo Yoshizawa)
7. "Yach-io Jishi" (Yoshizawa)
8. "Yoro Kobi" (Eto)
9. "Lullaby (3 Variations)" (Traditional)

== Personnel ==
- Kimio Eto - koto
- Bud Shank - flute
