= Structurally Sound =

Studio album by Booker Ervin
- Released: April 1967
- Recorded: December 14, 15 & 16, 1966
- Genre: Jazz
- Length: 39:35
- Label: Pacific Jazz
- Producer: Richard Bock

Booker Ervin chronology
Heavy!!! (1966)	Structurally Sound (1967)	Booker 'n' Brass (1967)

Structurally Sound is an album by American jazz saxophonist Booker Ervin recorded in 1966 and released on the Pacific Jazz label. The album was rereleased on CD in 2001 on the Blue Note label with four bonus tracks.

== Reception ==
The Allmusic review by Matt Collar awarded the album 3½ stars and stated: "Structurally Sound is perhaps not Ervin's most provocative album, but a solid and tasty endeavor".

Professional ratings
Review scores
Source	Rating
Allmusic	3.5/5 stars
The Penguin Guide to Jazz Recordings	3.5/4 stars

== Track listing ==
1. "Berkshire Blues" (Randy Weston) - 5:30
2. "Dancing in the Dark" (Howard Dietz, Arthur Schwartz) - 4:58
3. "Stolen Moments" (Oliver Nelson) - 4:59
4. "Franess" (Charles Tolliver) - 5:08
5. "Boo's Blues" (Booker Ervin) - 5:33
6. "You're My Everything" (Harry Warren, Mort Dixon, Joe Young) - 4:46
7. "Deep Night" (Charles Henderson, Rudy Vallee) - 4:58
8. "Take the "A" Train" (Billy Strayhorn) - 3:43
9. "Shiny Stockings" (Frank Foster) - 4:48 Bonus track on CD reissue
10. "White Christmas" (Irving Berlin) - 4:27 Bonus track on CD reissue
11. "Franess" [alternate take] (Tolliver) - 5:13 Bonus track on CD reissue
12. "Deep Night" [alternate take] (Henderson, Vallee) - 7:15 Bonus track on CD reissue

- Recorded at Pacific Jazz Studios in Los Angeles, California on December 14 (tracks 5, 6 & 9), December 15 (tracks 1, 4, 8 & 11), December 16 (tracks 2, 3, 7, 10 & 12), 1966.

== Personnel ==
- Booker Ervin - tenor saxophone
- Charles Tolliver - trumpet
- John Hicks - piano
- Red Mitchell - bass
- Lenny McBrowne - drums

== Charts ==
Chart performance for Structurally Sound
Chart (2026)	Peak position
UK Jazz & Blues Albums (Official Charts)	28
