= Kimio Eto =

Japanese musician

Kimio Eto (衛藤公雄, Etō Kimio; 28 September 1924 – 24 December 2012) was a blind Japanese musician who played the koto. He began musical training at the age of eight with the renowned master Michio Miyagi. When he was eleven, he composed his first work. By the age of sixteen, he had received three consecutive grand prizes as an artist and composer from the national ministry and guild.

Eto moved to the United States in the 1950s intending to popularize the koto in the Western world. By the mid-1960s, he became well-known in United States music recitals and concerts. He worked most notably with the American composer Henry Cowell on his Concerto for Koto and Orchestra. Eto was a soloist playing alongside the Philadelphia Orchestra conducted by Leopold Stokowski at the Philadelphia Academy of Music in December 1964.

== Albums ==
- Sound Of The Koto (1958)
- Koto Music (World Pacific Records, 1959)
- Koto & Flute (World Pacific Records, 1960) with Bud Shank
- Art Of The Koto (Elektra Records, 1962)
- Koto Master (World Pacific Records, 1963)
- Sound Of The Koto (compilation, él Records, 2013)

== See also ==
- Koto (musical instrument)
