= Pony's Express =

Studio album by Pony Poindexter
- Released: 1962
- Recorded: February 16, April 18 and May 10, 1962; New York City
- Genre: Jazz
- Length: 45:29
- Label: Epic; LA 16035
- Producer: Teo Macero

Pony Poindexter chronology
Pony's Express (1962)	Pony Poindexter Plays the Big Ones (1963)

Pony's Express is the debut album by saxophonist Pony Poindexter which was released on the Epic label in 1962.

== Reception ==
Professional ratings
Review scores
Source	Rating
Allmusic	4.5/5 stars
The Penguin Guide to Jazz Recordings	3/4 stars

Ken Dryden of Allmusic stated: "It's a shame that Pony Poindexter didn't get many more opportunities to record as a leader, as this release demonstrates his considerable promise".

== Track listing ==
1. "Catin' Latin" (Pony Poindexter) - 4:15
2. "Salt Peanuts" (Kenny Clarke, Dizzy Gillespie) - 3:39
3. "Skylark" (Hoagy Carmichael, Johnny Mercer) - 3:44
4. "Struttin' With Some Barbecue" (Lil Hardin Armstrong, Don Raye) - 5:32
5. "Blue" (Gildo Mahones) - 5:31
6. ""B" Frequency" (Teo Macero) - 1:43
7. "Mickey Mouse March" (Jimmie Dodd) - 3:06
8. "Basin Street Blues" (Spencer Williams) - 3:44
9. "Pony's Express" (Poindexter) - 2:20
10. "Lanyop" (Poindexter) - 9:40
11. "Artistry in Rhythm" (Stan Kenton) - 2:15

== Personnel ==
- Pony Poindexter - alto saxophone, soprano saxophone
- Eric Dolphy (tracks 6 & 10), Gene Quill (tracks 1, 2, 4, 9 & 11), Sonny Red (tracks 3, 5–8 & 10), Phil Woods (tracks 1–5, 7-9 & 11) - alto saxophone
- Dexter Gordon (tracks 1, 2, 4, 9 & 11), Jimmy Heath (tracks 6 & 10), Clifford Jordan (tracks 3, 5–8 & 10), Billy Mitchell (tracks 1, 2, 4, 9 & 11), Sal Nistico (tracks 3, 5, 7 & 8) - tenor saxophone
- Pepper Adams - baritone saxophone
- Tommy Flanagan (tracks 3, 5–8 & 10), Gildo Mahones (tracks 1, 2, 4 & 9–11) - piano
- Ron Carter (tracks 3, 5–8 & 10), Bill Yancey (tracks 1, 2, 4, 9 & 11) - bass
- Elvin Jones (tracks 6 & 10), Charli Persip (tracks 1–5, 7-9 & 11) - drums
