= Up & Down (Horace Parlan album) =

Studio album by Horace Parlan
- Released: April 1963
- Recorded: June 18, 1961; Van Gelder Studio, Englewood Cliffs
- Genre: Jazz
- Length: 44:54
- Label: Blue Note; BST 84082
- Producer: Alfred Lion

Horace Parlan chronology
On the Spur of the Moment (1961)	Up & Down (1963)	Happy Frame of Mind (1963)

Up & Down is an album by American jazz pianist Horace Parlan featuring performances recorded in 1961 and released on the Blue Note label.

Professional ratings
Review scores
Source	Rating
Down Beat (Original Lp release)	4/5 stars
Allmusic	4.5/5 stars

== Reception ==
The Allmusic review by Stephen Thomas Erlewine awarded the album 4 1/2 stars and stated that "it finds Parlan at a peak, and in many ways, coming into his own as a pianist and a leader".

== Track listing ==
All compositions by Horace Parlan except as indicated

1. "The Book's Beat" (Booker Ervin) - 9:50
2. "Up and Down" - 6:11
3. "Fugee" (George Tucker) - 7:04
4. "The Other Part of Town" (Grant Green) - 11:40
5. "Lonely One" (Babs Gonzales) - 4:06
6. "Light Blue" (Tommy Turrentine) - 6:03
7. "Fugee" [alternate take] (Tucker) - 7:01 Bonus track on CD reissue

== Personnel ==
- Horace Parlan - piano
- Booker Ervin - tenor saxophone
- Grant Green - guitar
- George Tucker - bass
- Al Harewood - drums
