= The Most Happy Fella (album) =

Studio album by Julius Watkins and Charlie Rouse
- Released: 1958
- Recorded: November 7 & 11, 1957; New York City
- Genre: Jazz
- Label: Atlantic; LP 1280
- Producer: Nesuhi Ertegun

Charlie Rouse chronology
The Chase Is On (1958)	The Most Happy Fella (1958)	The Jazz Modes (1959)

Julius Watkins chronology
Mood in Scarlet (1958)	The Most Happy Fella (1958)	The Jazz Modes (1959)

The Most Happy Fella is an album by The Jazz Modes led by horn player Julius Watkins and saxophonist Charlie Rouse recorded in 1957 and released on the Atlantic label. The album features jazz interpretations of songs from Frank Loesser's broadway musical The Most Happy Fella.

== Reception ==
The Allmusic review by Al Campbell awarded the album 3½ stars and stated "While it didn't match the huge success of such similarly attempted jazzed-up Broadway hits like Shelly Manne's My Fair Lady or the Miles Davis and Gil Evans collaboration on Porgy and Bess, the complex synchronization of Watkins' fluid mellow tone with the moderately choppy tenor lines of Rouse make for a lyrical bop/cool jazz hybrid that still sounds fresh".

Professional ratings
Review scores
Source	Rating
Allmusic	3.5/5 stars

== Track listing ==
All compositions by Frank Loesser

1. "Standing on the Corner" – 3:45
2. "Joey, Joey, Joey" – 3:56
3. "Warm All Over" – 4:59
4. "Happy to Make Your Acquaintance" – 4:29
5. "My Heart Is So Full of You" – 3:27
6. "The Most Happy Fella" – 3:42
7. "Don't Cry" – 3:09
8. "Like a Woman" – 2:59
9. "Somebody Somewhere" – 3:13

== Personnel ==
- Julius Watkins – French horn
- Charlie Rouse – tenor saxophone
- Gildo Mahones – piano
- Martin Rivera – bass
- Ron Jefferson – drums
- Eileen Gilbert – vocals (track 5)
