= Gumbo! =

Studio album by Pony Poindexter with Booker Ervin
- Released: 1963
- Recorded: June 27, 1963
- Studios: Van Gelder Studio, Englewood Cliffs, NJ
- Genre: Jazz
- Length: 75:29 CD reissue with bonus tracks
- Labels: Prestige; PR 16001
- Producer: Ozzie Cadena

Pony Poindexter chronology
Pony Poindexter Plays the Big Ones (1963)	Gumbo! (1963)	Annie Ross & Pony Poindexter (1966)

Booker Ervin chronology
Exultation! (1963)	Gumbo! (1963)	The Freedom Book (1963)

Gumbo! is an album by saxophonists Pony Poindexter and Booker Ervin which was released on the Prestige label in 1963. The 1999 CD reissue added eight unreleased selections from earlier sessions, three led by Poindexter and five by Ervin.

== Reception ==
Professional ratings
Review scores
Source	Rating
Allmusic	4/5 stars
The Penguin Guide to Jazz Recordings	3/4 stars

Al Campbell of Allmusic stated: "Tenor saxophonist Booker Ervin joined alto and soprano saxophonist Pony Poindexter in 1963 on Gumbo, based around the sights and sounds of Poindexter's birthplace, the Crescent City. Poindexter penned the majority of these compositions, providing them with evocative titles of the city". Reviewing the CD reissue with bonus tracks for All About Jazz, Derek Taylor observed: "Though this disc does consist of a rather bizarre match of sessions the music is uniformly entertaining and should be investigated, particularly by listeners who harbor an appreciation for Ervin".

== Track listing ==
All compositions by Pony Poindexter except where noted.

1. "Front O' Town" - 5:08
2. "Happy Strut" - 2:57
3. "Creole Girl" - 4:07
4. "4-11-44" - 2:59
5. "Back O' Town" - 4:12
6. "Muddy Dust" - 4:32
7. "French Market" - 4:48
8. "Gumbo Filet" - 3:19
9. "Moody's Mood for Love" (James Moody) - 5:16 Bonus track on CD reissue
10. "Blue and Sentimental" (Count Basie, Mack David, Jerry Livingston) - 2:55 Bonus track on CD reissue
11. "Wade in the Water" (Traditional) - 3:47 Bonus track on CD reissue
12. "Absotively Posalutely" (Larry Young) - 6:41 Bonus track on CD reissue
13. "You Don't Know What Love Is" (Gene de Paul, Don Raye) - 6:03 Bonus track on CD reissue
14. "You Don't Know What Love Is" [alternate take] (de Paul, Raye) - 6:05 Bonus track on CD reissue
15. "Autumn Leaves" (Joseph Kosma, Johnny Mercer, Jacques Prévert) - 4:19 Bonus track on CD reissue
16. "Old Folks" (Dedette Lee Hill, Willard Robison) - 8:21 Bonus track on CD reissue
- Recorded at Van Gelder Studio, Englewood Cliffs, NJ on January 31, 1963 (tracks 9–11), February 28, 1963 (tracks 12–16) and June 27, 1963 (tracks 1–8)

== Personnel ==
- Pony Poindexter - alto saxophone, soprano saxophone (tracks 1–11)
- Booker Ervin - tenor saxophone (tracks 2–5, 7–8 & 12–16)
- Al Grey - trombone (tracks 1–2, 5–8)
- Gildo Mahones - piano (tracks 1–11)
- Larry Young - organ (tracks 12–16)
- George Tucker - bass (tracks 1–11)
- Jimmie Smith (tracks 1–11), Jerry Thomas (tracks 12–16) - drums
