= Just Friends (Zoot Sims and Harry Edison album) =

Studio album by John Haley Sims and Harry Sweets Edison
- Released: 1980
- Recorded: December 18 & 20, 1978
- Studio: Group IV, Hollywood, CA
- Genre: Jazz
- Length: 40:42
- Label: Pablo; 2310 841
- Producer: Norman Granz

Zoot Sims chronology
The Sweetest Sounds (1979)	Just Friends (1980)	Mother ! Mother ! (1980)

Harry Sweets Edison chronology
Simply Sweets (1977)	Just Friends (1980)	'S Wonderful: Live at Club House 33 (1982)

Just Friends is an album by saxophonist Zoot Sims (credited on the original release as John Haley Sims) with trumpeter Harry Sweets Edison, recorded in late 1978 but not released by the Pablo label until 1980.

== Reception ==
Professional ratings
Review scores
Source	Rating
AllMusic	3/5 stars
The Penguin Guide to Jazz Recordings	3/4 stars

AllMusic reviewer Scott Yanow stated, "Although from different generations, tenor-saxophonist Zoot Sims and trumpeter Harry 'Sweets' Edison both always liked to swing, making their successful collaboration on this CD reissue not much of a surprise... The results are predictable but colorful and inventive within the boundaries of the idiom".

== Track listing ==
1. "Nature Boy" (eden ahbez) – 5:38
2. "How Deep Is the Ocean?" (Irving Berlin) – 6:52
3. "My Heart Belongs to Daddy" (Cole Porter) – 5:02
4. "I Understand" (Mabel Wayne, Kim Gannon) – 3:12
5. "Just Friends" (John Klenner, Sam M. Lewis) – 5:11
6. "Blue Skies" (Berlin) – 6:18
7. "Until Tonight (Mauve)" (Victor Young, Edward Heyman) – 4:47
8. "A Little Tutu" (Harry Sweets Edison) – 3:42

== Personnel ==
- John Haley Sims – tenor saxophone
- Harry Sweets Edison – trumpet
- Roger Kellaway – piano
- John Heard – bass
- Jimmie Smith – drums
