= French Horns for My Lady =

Studio album by Julius Watkins
- Released: 1962
- Recorded: December 1961; New York City
- Genre: Jazz
- Label: Philips; PHM 200-001/PHS 600-001
- Producer: Quincy Jones

Julius Watkins chronology
The Jazz Modes (1957)	French Horns for My Lady (1962)	Reasons in Tonality (1972)

French Horns for My Lady is an album by horn player Julius Watkins which was originally released on the Philips label in 1962.

Professional ratings
Review scores
Source	Rating
Allmusic	3/5 stars

== Track listing ==
1. "Temptation" (Nacio Herb Brown, Arthur Freed) – 3:10
2. "Clair de Lune" (Claude Debussy) – 2:56
3. "September Song" (Kurt Weill, Maxwell Anderson) – 2:52
4. "Catana" (Alfred Newman, Eddie DeLange) – 2:55
5. "I'm a Fool to Want You" (Jack Wolf, Joel Herron. Frank Sinatra) – 3:00
6. "Speak Low" (Weill, Ogden Nash) – 4:08
7. "Nuages" (Django Reinhardt) – 3:42
8. "The Boy Next Door" (Hugh Martin, Ralph Blane) – 3:10
9. "Mood Indigo" (Duke Ellington, Barney Bigard, Irving Mills) – 3:15
10. "Home (When Shadows Fall)" (Harry Clarkson, Geoffrey Clarkson, Peter van Steeden) – 2:57

== Personnel ==
- Julius Watkins – bandleader, French horn
- Roger "King" Mozian – trumpet
- Gunther Schuller, Bob Northern, James Buffington, John Barrows – French horn
- Jay McAllister – tuba
- Eddie Costa – piano, vibraphone
- George Duvivier – bass
- Ray Barretto – congas
- Martha Zena Flowers – vocals (tracks 4 & 7)
- Billy Byers – arranger
