= The Book Cooks =

Studio album by Booker Ervin
- Released: 1961
- Recorded: April 6, 1960
- Genre: Jazz
- Length: 41:32
- Label: Bethlehem
- Producer: Teddy Charles

Booker Ervin chronology
The Book Cooks (1961)	Cookin' (1960)

The Book Cooks is the debut album by American jazz saxophonist Booker Ervin featuring performances recorded in 1960 for the Bethlehem label.

== Reception ==
The Allmusic review by Scott Yanow awarded the album 4 stars and stated "Booker Ervin's debut as a leader teamed the intense tenor saxophonist with fellow tenor Zoot Sims".

Professional ratings
Review scores
Source	Rating
Allmusic	4/5 stars
Down Beat	3/5 stars
The Penguin Guide to Jazz Recordings	3/4 stars

== Track listing ==
All compositions by Booker Ervin except as indicated

1. "The Blue Book" - 8:35
2. "Git It" - 6:56
3. "Little Jane" - 6:24
4. "The Book Cooks" (Teddy Charles) - 10:42
5. "Largo" - 6:15
6. "Poor Butterfly" (John Golden, Raymond Hubbell) - 3:46

- Recorded on April 6, 1960.

== Personnel ==
- Booker Ervin - tenor saxophone
- Zoot Sims - tenor saxophone
- Tommy Turrentine - trumpet
- Tommy Flanagan - piano
- George Tucker - bass
- Dannie Richmond - drums
