= The Great Gildo =

Studio album by Gildo Mahones
- Released: 1965
- Recorded: February 4, 1963, August 15, 1963, September 3, 1963 and June 4, 1964
- Studio: Van Gelder Studio, Englewood Cliffs
- Genre: Jazz
- Label: Prestige; PR 7339
- Producer: Ozzie Cadena

Gildo Mahones chronology
I'm Shooting High (1963)	The Great Gildo (1965)	Gildo Mahones Trio (1990)

The Great Guildo (subtitled Soulful Piano) is a double album by jazz pianist Gildo Mahones recorded for the Prestige label in 1963 and 1964 and released in 1965. The album included five tracks intended for the pianist's debut album that were shelved temporarily when the Prestige subsidiary label New Jazz ceased releases.

== Reception ==
Professional ratings
Review scores
Source	Rating
AllMusic	4.5/5 stars

AllMusic awarded the album 4½ stars stating simply "Two-fer. Excellent jazz. A must-buy".

== Track listing ==
All compositions by Gildo Mahones, except where noted.

1. "Blues for Yna Yna"- 5:00
2. "Blue" – 5:15
3. "I Should Care" (Sammy Cahn, Axel Stordahl, Paul Weston) – 5:50
4. "I Wish You Love" (Léo Chauliac, Charles Trenet) – 5:30
5. "I Wonder What's Become of Our Love" – 5:30
6. "Alone Together" (Howard Dietz, Arthur Schwartz) – 6:45
7. "Walkin'" (Richard Carpenter) – 5:40
8. "Something Missing" – 3:30
9. "The Sweetest Sounds" (Richard Rodgers) – 4:45
10. "Rainy Day Love" – 4:20
11. "Mambesi"- 3:55
12. "Water Blues Fall" – 6:45
13. "Oye Ami Piano" – 4:00
14. "Good Morning Heartache" (Irene Higginbotham, Ervin Drake, Dan Fisher) – 5:45
15. "Bali Ha'i" (Oscar Hammerstein II, Richard Rodgers) – 4:20
16. "Tales of Brooklyn" – 3:55

Recorded at Van Gelder Studio in Englewood Cliffs, New Jersey on February 4, 1963 (track 15), August 15, 1963 (track 16), September 3, 1963 (tracks 9, 12 & 14) and June 4, 1964 (tracks 1–8, 10, 11 & 13)

== Personnel ==
- Gildo Mahones – piano
- Leo Wright – alto saxophone (track 16)
- Kenny Burrell – guitar (track 16)
- Larry Young – organ (track 15)
- George Tucker – bass
- Sonny Brown (tracks 1–8, 10, 11 & 13), Jimmie Smith (tracks 9, 12 & 14–16) – drums
- Ozzie Cadena – producer
- Rudy Van Gelder – engineer
