= Edison's Lights =

Studio album by Harry Edison
- Released: 1976
- Recorded: May 5, 1976
- Studio: RCA Recording Studios, Los Angeles, CA
- Genre: Jazz
- Length: 50:52
- Label: Pablo; 2310 780
- Producer: Norman Granz

Harry Edison chronology
Oscar Peterson and Harry Edison (1974)	Edison's Lights (1976)	Simply Sweets (1978)

Edison's Lights is an album by trumpeter Harry Edison recorded in 1976 and released by the Pablo label.

== Reception ==
Professional ratings
Review scores
Source	Rating
AllMusic	4/5 stars
The Penguin Guide to Jazz Recordings	3/4 stars

AllMusic reviewer Scott Yanow stated "All of the musicians sound quite inspired and are heard throughout playing at their best and most colorful".

== Track listing ==
All compositions by Harry Edison except where noted

1. "Edison's Lights" – 6:36
2. "Ain't Misbehavin'" (Fats Waller, Harry Brooks, Andy Razaf) – 6:00
3. "Avalon" (Buddy DeSylva, Vincent Rose, Al Jolson) – 5:40
4. ""E"" – 8:49
5. "Helena's Theme" – 3:22
6. "Home Grown" – 6:48
7. "Spring Is Here" (Richard Rodgers, Lorenz Hart) – 6:27
8. "On the Trail" (Ferde Grofé) – 7:10

== Personnel ==
- Harry Edison – trumpet
- Eddie "Lockjaw" Davis – tenor saxophone
- William Count Basie (tracks 1–4), Dolo Coker (tracks 5–8) – piano
- John Heard – bass
- Jimmie Smith – drums
