= Headin' South (album) =

Studio album by Horace Parlan
- Released: 1961
- Recorded: December 6, 1960
- Studios: Van Gelder Studio, Englewood Cliffs, NJ
- Genre: Jazz
- Length: 41:38
- Labels: Blue Note; BST 84062
- Producer: Alfred Lion

Horace Parlan chronology
Speakin' My Piece (1960)	Headin' South (1961)	On the Spur of the Moment (1961)

Headin' South is an album by American jazz pianist Horace Parlan featuring performances recorded in 1960 and released on the Blue Note label.

== Reception ==
The Allmusic review by Stephen Thomas Erlewine awarded the album 4 stars and stated: "On the surface, Headin' South is another set of bluesy soul-jazz, but it actually finds the Horace Parlan trio stretching out a little... another understated but solid effort."

Professional ratings
Review scores
Source	Rating
Allmusic	4/5 stars

== Track listing ==
All compositions by Horace Parlan except as indicated

1. "Headin' South" – 4:29
2. "The Song Is Ended" (Irving Berlin) – 5:55
3. "Summertime" (George Gershwin, DuBose Heyward) – 5:59
4. "Low Down" – 5:30
5. "Congalegre" (Ray Barretto) – 4:24
6. "Prelude to a Kiss" (Duke Ellington, Irving Gordon, Irving Mills) – 5:28
7. "Jim Loves Sue" (Ahmad Jamal) – 4:32
8. "My Mother's Eyes" (Abel Baer, L. Wolfe Gilbert) – 5:21

== Personnel ==
- Horace Parlan – piano
- George Tucker – bass
- Al Harewood – drums
- Ray Barretto – congas (tracks 1, 2, 4, 5, 7 & 8)
