= Mood in Scarlet =

Studio album by Julius Watkins and Charlie Rouse
- Released: 1957
- Recorded: December 4, 1956; New York City
- Genre: Jazz
- Label: Dawn; DLP-1117
- Producer: Chuck Darwin

Charlie Rouse chronology
Les Jazz Modes (1957)	Mood in Scarlet (1957)	The Chase Is On (1957)

Julius Watkins chronology
Les Jazz Modes (1957)	Mood in Scarlet (1957)	The Most Happy Fella (1958)

Mood in Scarlet is an album by Les Modes led by horn player Julius Watkins and saxophonist Charlie Rouse recorded in 1956 and released on the Dawn label.

== Reception ==
Professional ratings
Review scores
Source	Rating
AllMusic	2/5 stars
The Penguin Guide to Jazz	3/4 stars

AllMusic awarded the album 2 stars

== Track listing ==
All compositions by Julius Watkins except as indicated

1. "Baubles, Bangles and Beads" (Robert Wright, George Forrest, Alexander Borodin) – 2:43
2. "Autumn Leaves" (Joseph Kosma, Jacques Prévert, Johnny Mercer) – 5:14
3. "The Golden Chariot" (Gildo Mahones) – 2:45
4. "Let's Try (Charles Isaiah Darwin, Paulette Girard) – 3:18
5. "Bohemia" (Ed Smollett, Charles E. Shirley, Mynell Allen) – 3:26
6. "Catch Her" – 2:40
7. "Hoo Tai" – 6:27
8. "Moon in Scarlet" – 5:11
9. "Linda Delia" (George Butcher) – 4:18
10. "I've Got You Under My Skin" (Cole Porter) – 3:23 Bonus track on CD reissue
11. "We Can Talk It Over" – 3:21 Bonus track on CD reissue

== Personnel ==
- Julius Watkins – French horn
- Charlie Rouse – tenor saxophone
- Gildo Mahones – piano
- Martin Rivera – bass
- Ron Jefferson – drums
- Chino Pozo – congas, bongos (tracks 5 & 6)
- Eileen Gilbert – vocals (tracks 7 & 8)
