= New Groove (Bud Shank album) =

Studio album by Bud Shank
- Released: 1961
- Recorded: May 1961; Los Angeles, CA
- Genre: Jazz
- Label: Pacific Jazz; PJ 21
- Producer: Richard Bock

Bud Shank chronology
Koto & Flute (1960)	New Groove (1961)	Barefoot Adventure (1961)

New Groove is an album by saxophonist Bud Shank released on the Pacific Jazz label. The album features trumpeter Carmell Jones.

== Reception ==
Professional ratings
Review scores
Source	Rating
AllMusic	3/5 stars

Oscar Peterson, commenting on the track "Well You Needn't" in 1961, criticized Peacock, saying: "the bass line and the bass projection [...] take away from a lot of the soloists". AllMusic rated the album with 3 stars.

== Track listing ==
All compositions by Bud Shank, except as indicated.

1. "New Groove" - 6:45
2. "The Awakening" - 4:23
3. "White Lightnin'" - 5:20
4. "Sultry Serenade" (Tyree Glenn) - 7:20
5. "Well You Needn't" (Thelonious Monk) - 6:58
6. "Liddledabulduya" (Gary Peacock) - 4:55

== Personnel ==
- Bud Shank - alto saxophone, baritone saxophone
- Carmell Jones - trumpet
- Dennis Budimir - guitar
- Gary Peacock - bass
- Mel Lewis - drums
