= The In Between (album) =

Studio album by Booker Ervin
- Released: October 1968
- Recorded: January 12, 1968
- Studio: Van Gelder Studio, Englewood Cliffs, NJ
- Genre: Jazz
- Length: 40:18
- Label: Blue Note; BST 84283
- Producer: Francis Wolff

Booker Ervin chronology
Booker 'n' Brass (1967)	The In Between (1968)	Tex Book Tenor (1968)

The In Between is an album by American jazz saxophonist Booker Ervin recorded in 1968 and released on the Blue Note label.

== Reception ==
The Allmusic review by Stephen Thomas Erlewine awarded the album 4 stars and stated "The music rarely reaches avant-garde territory -- instead, it's edgy, volatile hard bop that comes from the mind as much as the soul... The result is a satisfying, cerebral set of adventurous hard bop that finds Booker Ervin at a creative peak".

Richard Cook and Brian Morton of The Penguin Guide to Jazz gave the album a three-star rating (of a possible four), noting that "unlike some other figures on the [Blue Note] label, Ervin seemed determined to show that there was still considerable mileage in hard bop, without needing to head off into 'the avant-garde'. In consequence, these half-dozen taut originals are every bit as challenging as the free jazz of the time, and commanded exceptional musicianship from a relatively obscure group."

Professional ratings
Review scores
Source	Rating
Allmusic	4/5 stars
Penguin Guide to Jazz	3/4 stars

== Track listing ==
All compositions by Booker Ervin

1. "The In Between" - 7:43
2. "The Muse" - 7:17
3. "Mour" - 5:59
4. "Sweet Pea" - 5:36
5. "Largo" - 6:27
6. "Tyra" - 7:29

== Personnel ==
- Booker Ervin - tenor saxophone, flute
- Richard Williams - trumpet (tracks 1–4 & 6)
- Bobby Few - piano
- Cevera Jeffries - bass
- Lenny McBrowne - drums
