= The Blues Book =

Studio album by Booker Ervin
- Released: 1964
- Recorded: June 30, 1964
- Studios: Van Gelder Studio, Englewood Cliffs
- Genre: Jazz
- Length: 41:27
- Labels: Prestige; PRLP 7340
- Producer: Don Schlitten

Booker Ervin chronology
The Song Book (1964)	The Blues Book (1964)	The Space Book (1964)

The Blues Book is an album by American jazz saxophonist Booker Ervin featuring performances recorded in 1964 for the Prestige label. The front cover photograph was taken by Don Schlitten of Booker outside of 16 Minetta Lane, Greenwich Village, New York City.

== Reception ==
The Allmusic review by Scott Yanow awarded the album 4½ stars and stated: "The consistently passionate Ervin makes each of the fairly basic originals sound fresh and the performances are frequently exciting inside/outside music".

Professional ratings
Review scores
Source	Rating
Allmusic	4.5/5 stars
The Rolling Stone Jazz Record Guide	4/5 stars
The Penguin Guide to Jazz Recordings	3.5/4 stars

== Track listing ==
All compositions by Booker Ervin.

1. "Eerie Dearie" – 14:30
2. "One for Mort" – 6:24
3. "No Booze Blooze" – 15:26
4. "True Blue" – 5:07

== Personnel ==
- Booker Ervin – tenor saxophone
- Carmell Jones – trumpet
- Gildo Mahones – piano
- Richard Davis – bass
- Alan Dawson – drums
