= The Freedom Book =

Studio album by Booker Ervin
- Released: March 1964
- Recorded: December 3, 1963
- Studio: Van Gelder Studio, Englewood Cliffs, NJ
- Genre: Post-bop, hard bop
- Length: 40:05
- Label: Prestige; PRLP 7295
- Producer: Don Schlitten

Booker Ervin chronology
Gumbo! (1963)	The Freedom Book (1964)	The Song Book (1964)

The Freedom Book is an album by American jazz saxophonist Booker Ervin featuring performances recorded in 1963 for the Prestige label.

== Reception ==
The Allmusic review by Steve Leggett awarded the album 4½ stars and stated "The Freedom Book is a near perfect set of modern hard bop, ranging just far enough out there to feel fresh but retaining a strong lifeline to bop tradition".

Professional ratings
Review scores
Source	Rating
Allmusic	4.5/5 stars
The Rolling Stone Jazz Record Guide	5/5 stars
The Penguin Guide to Jazz Recordings	4/4 stars

== Track listing ==
All compositions by Booker Ervin except where noted

1. "A Lunar Tune" - 7:50
2. "Cry Me Not" (Randy Weston) - 4:53
3. "Grant's Stand" - 8:01
4. "A Day to Mourn" - 9:33
5. "Al's In" - 9:48

== Personnel ==
- Booker Ervin - tenor saxophone
- Jaki Byard - piano
- Richard Davis - bass
- Alan Dawson - drums
