= Booker Ervin =

American saxophonist (1930–1970)

Background information
- Born: Booker Telleferro Ervin II; October 31, 1930; Denison, Texas, U.S.
- Died: August 31, 1970 (aged 39) New York City, U.S.
- Genre: Hard bop
- Instrument: Tenor saxophone
- Formerly of: Charles Mingus

Booker Telleferro Ervin II (October 31, 1930 – August 31, 1970) was an American tenor saxophone player. His tenor playing was characterised by a strong, tough sound and blues/gospel phrasing. He is remembered for his association with bassist Charles Mingus.

== Biography ==
Ervin was born in Denison, Texas, United States. He first learned to play trombone at a young age from his father, who played the instrument with Buddy Tate. After graduating from high school, Ervin enlisted in the United States Air Force and was stationed in Okinawa, Japan, during which he taught himself to play the tenor saxophone. After completing his military service in 1953, he pursued formal training at the Berklee College of Music in Boston, Massachusetts. After studying music in Boston for two years, he moved to Tulsa in 1954, he played with the band of Ernie Fields.

After stays in Denver and Pittsburgh, Ervin moved to New York City in spring 1958, initially working a day job and playing jam sessions at night. Ervin then worked with Charles Mingus regularly from late 1958 to 1960, rejoining various outfits led by the bassist at various times up to autumn 1964, when he departed for Europe. During the mid-1960s, Ervin led his own quartet, recording for Prestige Records with, among others, ex-Mingus associate pianist Jaki Byard, along with bassist Richard Davis and Alan Dawson on drums.

Ervin later recorded for Blue Note Records and played with pianist Randy Weston, with whom he recorded between 1963 and 1966. Weston said: "Booker Ervin, for me, was on the same level as John Coltrane. He was a completely original saxophonist.... He was a master.... 'African Cookbook', which I composed back in the early '60s, was partly named after Booker because we (musicians) used to call him 'Book,' and we would say, 'Cook, Book.' Sometimes when he was playing we'd shout, 'Cook, Book, cook.' And the melody of 'African Cookbook' was based upon Booker Ervin's sound, a sound like the north of Africa. He would kind of take those notes and make them weave hypnotically. So, actually the African Cookbook was influenced by Booker Ervin."

Between October 1964 to summer 1966, Ervin worked and lived in Europe, playing gigs in France, Spain, Italy, Germany, Norway, Sweden, Denmark and The Netherlands. Basing himself in Barcelona, Spain, he featured regularly at the city's Jamboree Club. He recorded and broadcast while overseas, making albums with his own quartet, Dexter Gordon and Catalan vocalist Núria Feliu, featuring on various radio programmes and appearing at several jazz festivals, including a guest slot at the 1965 Berlin Jazz Festival, during which he performed a 25-minute improvisation. This performance was issued as "Blues For You" on the album Lament For Booker Ervin (Enja Records) in 1977.

Following his return to the United States in summer 1966, Ervin led his own groups in jazz clubs throughout the country, and appeared at both the Newport Jazz Festival (1967) and the Monterey Jazz Festival (1966) performing with Randy Weston; a recording of their performance was issued on CD in 1994. In 1968, Ervin again appeared at clubs and festivals in Scandinavia, broadcasting with the Danish Radio Big Band. He recorded again for Prestige, but in late 1966 was signed to West Coast label, Pacific Jazz, for whom he taped two albums, Structurally Sound and Booker 'n' Brass (1967), before switching to Blue Note. Ervin recorded two Blue Note albums under his own name, In Between and Tex Book Tenor, the latter going unissued during his lifetime, initially being released in the 1970s as part of a double album shared with recordings (on which Ervin features) made under the leadership of Horace Parlan (Back from the Gig). In 2005, Blue Note issued as single CD of Tex Book Tenor in its limited edition Connoisseur series.

Ervin's final recorded appearance occurred in January 1969, when he guested on a further Prestige album headed by teenage multi-instrumentalist Eric Kloss.

Ervin died of kidney disease in New York City in 1970, aged 39. Most biographical accounts of Ervin's death give an incorrect date. His gravestone in The National Cemetery, East Farmingdale, New York, clearly shows the date as August 31, 1970.

In 2017, Ervin was the subject of a mini-biography written by English saxophonist and author Simon Spillett, published as part of an anthology package titled The Good Book (Acrobat Records)

== Tributes ==
Booker Ervin has been remembered by many artists, Ted Curson called one of his albums Ode to Booker Ervin; the band "Steam", in their album Real Time, called one of their tracks "Tellefero"; and others...

== Discography ==
=== As leader ===
Year recorded	Title	Label	Year released	Personnel/Notes
1960	The Book Cooks	Bethlehem	1960	Sextet, with Ervin and Zoot Sims (tenor sax), Tommy Turrentine (trumpet), Tommy Flanagan (piano), George Tucker (bass), Danny Richmond (drums)
1960	Cookin'	Savoy	1961	Quintet, with Ervin (tenor sax), Richard Williams (trumpet), Horace Parlan (piano), George Tucker (bass), Danny Richmond (drums); reissued as Down in the Dumps (1978)
1960	That's It!	Candid	1961	Quartet, with Ervin (tenor sax), Horace Parlan (piano), George Tucker (bass), Al Harewood (drums)
1963	Exultation!	Prestige	1963	Quintet, with Ervin (tenor sax), Frank Strozier (alto sax), Horace Parlan (piano), Butch Warren (bass), Walter Perkins (drums)
1963	Gumbo! – with Pony Poindexter	Prestige	1963	Four quintet tracks, with Ervin (tenor sax), Pony Poindexter (alto, soprano sax), Gildo Mahones (piano), George Tucker (bass), Jimmie Smith (drums); four sextet tracks, with Al Grey (trombone) added
1963	The Freedom Book	Prestige	1964	Quartet, with Ervin (tenor sax), Jaki Byard (piano), Richard Davis (bass), Alan Dawson (drums)
1963–64	Groovin' High	Prestige	1966	Three quartet tracks, with Ervin (tenor sax), Jaki Byard (piano), Richard Davis (bass), Alan Dawson (drums); one quintet track, with Ervin (tenor sax), Carmell Jones (trumpet), Gildo Mahones (piano), Richard Davis (bass), Alan Dawson (drums)
1964	The Song Book	Prestige	1964	Quartet, with Ervin (tenor sax), Tommy Flanagan (piano), Richard Davis (bass), Alan Dawson (drums)
1964	The Blues Book	Prestige	1964	Quintet, with Ervin (tenor sax), Carmell Jones (trumpet), Gildo Mahones (piano), Richard Davis (bass), Alan Dawson (drums)
1964	The Space Book	Prestige	1965	Quartet, with Ervin (tenor sax), Jaki Byard (piano), Richard Davis (bass), Alan Dawson (drums)
1965	The Trance	Prestige	1967	Quartet, with Ervin (tenor sax), Jaki Byard (piano), Reggie Workman (bass), Alan Dawson (drums)
1965	Setting the Pace – with Dexter Gordon	Prestige	1967	Quintet, with Ervin and Dexter Gordon (tenor sax), Jaki Byard (piano), Reggie Workman (bass), Alan Dawson (drums)
1965	Lament for Booker Ervin	Enja	1975	Two quartet tracks, with Ervin (tenor sax), Kenny Drew (piano), Niels-Henning Ørsted Pedersen (bass), Alan Dawson (drums); the other track has Horace Parlan (piano) in the quartet
1966	Heavy!!!	Prestige	1967	Sextet, with Ervin (tenor sax), Jimmy Owens (trumpet, flugelhorn), Garnett Brown (trombone), Jaki Byard (piano), Richard Davis (bass), Alan Dawson (drums)
1966	Structurally Sound	Pacific Jazz	1967	Quintet, with Ervin (tenor sax), Charles Tolliver (trumpet), John Hicks (piano), Red Mitchell (bass), Lenny McBrowne (drums)
1967	Newport 1967	Megadisc		Quartet, with Ervin (tenor sax), Chick Corea (piano), Reggie Johnson (bass), Lenny McBrowne (drums); unofficial release
1967	Booker 'n' Brass	Pacific Jazz	1967	With Ervin (tenor sax), Freddie Hubbard, Charles Tolliver, Richard Williams (trumpet), Ray Copeland (trumpet, flugelhorn), Garnett Brown, Bennie Green (trombone), Benny Powell (bass trombone), Kenny Barron (piano), Reggie Johnson (string bass), Lenny McBrowne (drums); Ervin (tenor sax), Johnny Coles, Williams (trumpet), Martin Banks, Copeland (trumpet, flugelhorn), Green, Britt Woodman (trombone), Powell (bass trombone), Barron (piano), Johnson (bass), McBrowne (drums); Banks, Copeland, Hubbard, Williams (trumpet), Brown, Green (trombone), Barron (piano), Johnson (bass), McBrowne (drums)
1968	The In Between	Blue Note	1968	Quintet, with Ervin (tenor sax), Richard Williams (trumpet), Bobby Few (piano), Cevera Jeffries Jr. (bass), Lenny McBrowne (drums)
1968	Back from the Gig	Blue Note	1976	Five quintet tracks, with Ervin (tenor sax), Woody Shaw (trumpet), Kenny Barron (piano), Jan Arnett (bass), Billy Higgins (drums); double LP also including a 1963 session led by Horace Parlan, which was reissued separately in 1986 as Happy Frame of Mind; this session reissued separately in 2005 as Tex Book Tenor

=== As sideman ===
With Bill Barron

- Hot Line (Savoy, 1962 [1964])

With Jaki Byard

- Out Front! (Prestige, 1964)

With Teddy Charles

- Jazz In The Garden At The Museum Of Modern Art (Warwick, 1960)

With Ted Curson

- Urge (Fontana, 1966)

With Núria Feliu

- Núria Feliu with Booker Ervin (Edigsa, 1965)

With Roy Haynes

- Cracklin' (New Jazz, 1963)

With Andrew Hill

- Grass Roots (Blue Note, 1968)

With Eric Kloss

- In the Land of the Giants (Prestige, 1969)

With Lambert, Hendricks & Bavan

- Havin' a Ball at the Village Gate (RCA, 1963)

With Charles Mingus

- Jazz Portraits: Mingus in Wonderland (United Artists, 1959)
- Mingus Ah Um (Columbia, 1959)
- Mingus Dynasty (Columbia, 1959)
- Blues & Roots (Atlantic, 1959)
- Mingus (Candid, 1960)
- Mingus at Antibes (Atlantic, 1960 [1976])
- Reincarnation of a Lovebird (Candid, 1960)
- Oh Yeah (Atlantic, 1961)
- Tonight at Noon (Atlantic, 1957-61 [1965])
- Mingus Mingus Mingus Mingus Mingus (Impulse!, 1963)

With Horace Parlan

- Up & Down (Blue Note, 1961)
- Happy Frame of Mind (Blue Note, 1963 [1988])

With Don Patterson

- The Exciting New Organ of Don Patterson (Prestige, 1964)
- Hip Cake Walk (Prestige, 1964)
- Patterson's People (Prestige, 1964)
- Tune Up! (Prestige, 1964 [1971])

With Sonny Stitt

- Soul People (Prestige, 1965)

With Mal Waldron

- The Quest (New Jazz, 1961)

With Randy Weston

- Highlife (Colpix, 1963)
- Randy (Bakton, 1964) - also released as African Cookbook (Atlantic) in 1972
- Monterey '66 (Verve, 1966 [1994])
