= Happy Frame of Mind =

Studio album by Horace Parlan
- Released: 1986
- Recorded: February 15, 1963
- Studio: Van Gelder Studio, Englewood Cliffs, NJ
- Genre: Jazz
- Length: 38:52
- Label: Blue Note; BST 84134
- Producer: Alfred Lion

Horace Parlan chronology
Up & Down (1961)	Happy Frame of Mind (1986)	Arrival (1973)

Happy Frame of Mind is an album by American jazz pianist Horace Parlan featuring performances recorded for Blue Note in 1963, but not released under Parlan's name on the label until 1986. The session was originally released under Booker Ervin's name in 1976 as part of the Blue Note 2-LP set Back from the Gig and later released as originally intended. The album was first released on a CD in 1995.

== Reception ==
The Allmusic review by Stephen Thomas Erlewine awarded the album 4½ stars and stated: "Happy Frame of Mind finds Horace Parlan breaking away from the soul-inflected hard bop that had become his trademark, moving his music into more adventurous, post-bop territory... it's one of Parlan's most successful efforts, finding the perfect middle ground between accessible, entertaining jazz and more adventurous music."

Professional ratings
Review scores
Source	Rating
Allmusic	4.5/5 stars

== Track listing ==
1. "Home Is Africa" (Ronnie Boykins) - 6:14
2. "A Tune for Richard" (Booker Ervin) - 5:44
3. "Back from the Gig" (Parlan) - 5:58
4. "Dexi" (Johnny Coles) - 5:57
5. "Kucheza Blues" (Randy Weston) - 6:10
6. "Happy Frame of Mind" (Parlan) - 8:49

== Personnel ==
- Horace Parlan - piano
- Johnny Coles - trumpet
- Booker Ervin - tenor saxophone
- Grant Green - guitar (#1–4, 6)
- Butch Warren - bass
- Billy Higgins - drums
