= Julius Watkins =

American jazz hornist (1921–1977)

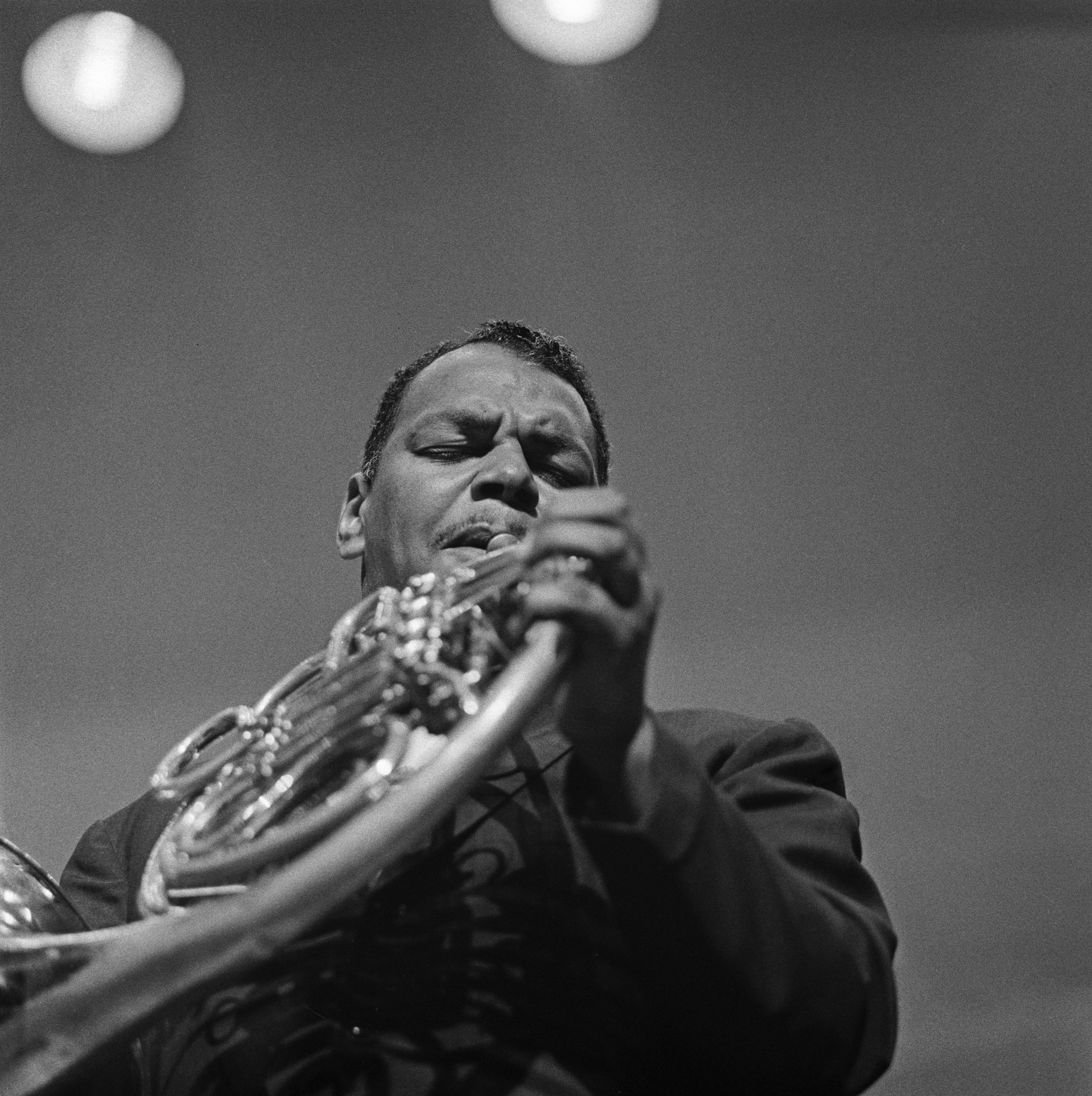
- Julius Watkins in 1960

Background information
- Born: October 10, 1921; Detroit, Michigan, U.S.
- Died: April 4, 1977 (aged 55) Short Hills, New Jersey, U.S.
- Genres: Jazz
- Occupation: Musician
- Instrument: French horn
- Years active: 1940s–1970s
- Label: Blue Note

Julius Watkins (October 10, 1921 – April 4, 1977) was an American jazz musician who played French horn. Described by AllMusic as "virtually the father of the jazz French horn", Watkins won the Down Beat critics poll in 1960 and 1961 for Miscellaneous Instrument.

== Life and career ==
Watkins was born in Detroit, Michigan, United States. He began playing the French horn when he was nine years old. Watkins began his career in jazz playing the trumpet in the Ernie Fields Orchestra from 1943 to 1946. By the late 1940s, he had played some French horn solos on recording sessions led by Kenny Clarke and Babs Gonzales. After moving to New York City, Watkins studied for three years at the Manhattan School of Music. He started appearing in small-group jazz sessions, including two led by Thelonious Monk, featuring on "Friday the 13th" on the album Thelonious Monk and Sonny Rollins (1954).

Watkins recorded with many other jazz musicians, including John Coltrane, Freddie Hubbard, Charles Mingus, Miles Davis and Gil Evans, Phil Woods, Clark Terry, Johnny Griffin, Randy Weston, and with the Jazz Composer's Orchestra. He co-led, with Charlie Rouse, the group Les Jazz Modes from 1956 to 1959, and he toured with Quincy Jones and his band from 1959 to 1961.

In 1969, Watkins played French horn for the beat poet Allen Ginsberg's album Songs of Innocence and Experience (1970), a musical adaptation of William Blake's poetry collection of the same name.

Suffering from diabetes, liver and kidney problems, and chronic alcoholism, Watkins died from a heart attack in Short Hills, New Jersey, at the age of 55.

From 1994 to 1998, an annual Julius Watkins Jazz Horn Festival was held in New York, beginning at the Knitting Factory,) honoring his legacy. After an eleven-year break, another Julius Watkins Festival was held on October 3, 2009, in Seattle, Washington, at Cornish College of the Arts. On September 29, 2012, the seventh Julius Watkins Jazz Horn Festival was held at Virginia Commonwealth University in Richmond, Virginia.

== Discography ==
=== As leader/co-leader ===
- Julius Watkins Sextet, Vol 1 & 2 (Blue Note, 1954, 1955)
- French Horns for My Lady (Phillips, 1962)

With Charlie Rouse as Les Jazz Modes/The Jazz Modes

- Jazzville Vol. 1 (Dawn, 1956) - shared LP with Gene Quill-Dick Sherman Quintet
- Les Jazz Modes (Dawn, 1956)
- Mood in Scarlet (Dawn, 1956)
- The Most Happy Fella (Atlantic, 1958)
- The Jazz Modes (Atlantic, 1959)

With Jazz Contemporaries (George Coleman, Clifford Jordan, Harold Mabern, Larry Ridley, Keno Duke)

- Reasons in Tonality (Strata-East, 1972)

=== As sideman ===
With Manny Albam

- Jazz Goes to the Movies (Impulse!, 1962)

With Benny Bailey

- Big Brass (Candid, 1960)

With Art Blakey

- Golden Boy (Colpix, 1964)

With Kenny Burrell

- Guitar Forms (Verve, 1965)

With Billy Byers

- Impressions of Duke Ellington (Mercury, 1961)

With Donald Byrd

- Jazz Lab (Columbia, 1957) - with Gigi Gryce
- Modern Jazz Perspective (Columbia, 1957) - with Gigi Gryce

With John Coltrane

- Africa/Brass (Impulse!, 1961)
- The Africa/Brass Sessions, Volume 2 (Impulse!, 1961 [1974])

With Tadd Dameron

- The Magic Touch (Riverside, 1962)

With Miles Davis

- Porgy and Bess (Columbia, 1959)
- Miles Davis at Carnegie Hall (Columbia, 1961)
- Quiet Nights (Columbia, 1963)

With Billy Eckstein

- At Basin Street East (EmArcy, 1961) with Quincy Jones

With Gil Evans

- New Bottle Old Wine (World Pacific, 1958)
- The Individualism of Gil Evans (Verve, 1964)
- Blues in Orbit (Enja, 1971)

With Art Farmer

- Brass Shout (United Artists, 1959)

With Curtis Fuller and Hampton Hawes

- Curtis Fuller and Hampton Hawes with French Horns (Status, 1957 [1962])

With Dizzy Gillespie

- Gillespiana (Verve, 1960)

With Allen Ginsberg

- Songs of Innocence and Experience (MGM, 1970)

With Benny Golson

- Benny Golson's New York Scene (Contemporary, 1957)

With Johnny Griffin

- Change of Pace (Riverside, 1961)

With Gigi Gryce

- Nica's Tempo (Signal, 1955)

With Jimmy Heath

- The Quota (Riverside, 1961)
- Triple Threat (Riverside, 1962)
- Swamp Seed (Riverside, 1963)

With Freddie Hubbard

- The Body & the Soul (Impulse!, 1963)

With Milt Jackson

- Meet Milt Jackson (Savoy, 1949)
- Roll 'Em Bags (Savoy, 1949)
- For Someone I Love (Riverside, 1963)

With The Jazz Composer's Orchestra

- The Jazz Composer's Orchestra (JCOA 1968)

With Quincy Jones

- The Birth of a Band! (Mercury, 1959)
- The Great Wide World of Quincy Jones (Mercury, 1959)
- Q Live in Paris Circa 1960 (Quest, 1960 [1996])
- The Birth of a Band! Vol. 2 (Mercury, 1959-60 [1984])
- I Dig Dancers (Mercury, 1960)
- Around the World (Mercury, 1961)
- Newport '61 (Mercury, 1961)
- The Great Wide World Of Quincy Jones: Live! (Mercury, 1961 [1984])
- The Quintessence (Impulse!, 1962)
- Big Band Bossa Nova (Mercury, 1962)
- Quincy Jones Plays Hip Hits (Mercury, 1963)
- Quincy Plays for Pussycats (Mercury, 1959-65 [1965])

With Thad Jones and Mel Lewis

- Consummation (Solid State, 1970)
- Suite for Pops (Horizon, 1975)
- New Life (Horizon, 1976)

With Beverly Kenney

- Come Swing with Me (Roost, 1956)

With Stan Kenton

- Cuban Fire! (Capitol Records, 1956)

With Roland Kirk

- Left & Right (Atlantic, 1968)

With Michel Legrand

- Michel Legrand Big Band Plays Richard Rogers (Phillips, 1963)

With the Manhattan Jazz All-Stars

- Swinging Guys and Dolls (Columbia, 1959)

With Herbie Mann

- The Herbie Mann String Album (Atlantic, 1967)

With Cal Massey

- Blues to Coltrane (Candid, 1961 [1987])

With Mat Mathews

- The Modern Art of Jazz by Mat Mathews (Dawn, 1956)
- 4 French Horns plus Rhythm (Elektra, 1958)

With Charles McPherson

- Today's Man (Mainstream, 1973)

With Gil Mellé

- Gil's Guests (Prestige, 1963)

With Charles Mingus

- Music Written for Monterey 1965 (Jazz Workshop, 1965)
- Let My Children Hear Music (Columbia, 1972)

With Blue Mitchell

- A Sure Thing (Riverside, 1962)

With Thelonious Monk

- Monk (Prestige, 1954)
- Thelonious Monk and Sonny Rollins (Prestige, 1954)

With David Newman

- The Many Facets of David Newman (Atlantic, 1969)

With Oliver Nelson

- Afro/American Sketches (Prestige, 1961)

With Chico O'Farrill

- Nine Flags (Impulse!, 1966)

With Oscar Peterson

- Bursting Out with the All-Star Big Band! (Verve, 1962)

With Oscar Pettiford

- The New Oscar Pettiford Sextet (Debut, 1953)
- Oscar Pettiford (Bethlehem, 1954)
- The Oscar Pettiford Orchestra in Hi-Fi (ABC-Paramount, 1956)
- The Oscar Pettiford Orchestra in Hi-Fi Volume Two (ABC-Paramount, 1957)

With Johnny Richards

- Experiments in Sound (Capitol, 1958)
- The Rites of Diablo (Roulette, 1958)
- Walk Softly/Run Wild! (Coral, 1959)

With the Riverside Jazz Stars

- A Jazz Version of Kean (Riverside, 1962)

With Pete Rugolo

- Rugolomania (Columbia, 1955)
- New Sounds by Pete Rugolo (Harmony, 1954–55, [1957])

With Pharoah Sanders

- Karma (Impulse, 1969)

With George Shearing

- Satin Brass (Capitol, 1959)

With Warren Smith

- Composer's Workshop Ensemble (Strata-East, 1972)

With Les Spann

- Gemini (Jazzland, 1961)

With Billy Taylor

- Kwamina (Mercury, 1961)

With Clark Terry

- Color Changes (Candid, 1960)

With McCoy Tyner

- Song of the New World (Milestone, 1973)

With Randy Weston

- Uhuru Afrika (Roulette, 1960)
- Highlife (Colpix, 1963)
- Tanjah (Polydor, 1973)

With Art Webb

- Mr. Flute (Atlantic, 1977)

With Mary Lou Williams

- Mary Lou's Mass (Mary, 1972 [1975])

With Phil Woods

- Rights of Swing (Candid, 1961)
