= Pony Poindexter =

American jazz saxophonist (1926–1988)

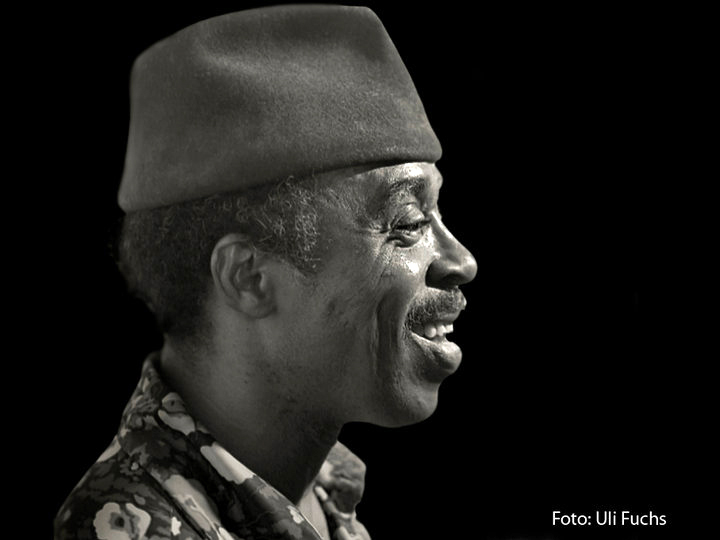

Background information
- Born: Norwood Poindexter; February 8, 1926; New Orleans, Louisiana, U.S.
- Died: April 14, 1988 Oakland, California, U.S.
- Genres: Jazz
- Occupation: Musician
- Instrument: Saxophone
- Years active: 1940s–1980s
- Labels: Epic Records, Prestige, Inner City

Norwood "Pony" Poindexter (February 8, 1926 – April 14, 1988) was an American jazz saxophonist who was born in New Orleans and died in Oakland, California.

Poindexter began on clarinet and switched to playing alto and tenor sax. In 1940, he studied under Sidney Desvigne, and following World War II he attended the newly founded Candell Conservatory of Music in Oakland, California. From 1947 to 1950, he played with Billy Eckstine. In 1950, he played in a quartet with Vernon Alley. From 1951 to 1952, he was with Lionel Hampton; and, in 1952, he played with Stan Kenton. Neal Hefti wrote the tune "Little Pony", named after Poindexter, for the Count Basie Orchestra. Through the end of the 1950s Poindexter played extensively both as a leader and as a sideman, recording with Charlie Parker, Nat King Cole, T-Bone Walker, and Jimmy Witherspoon. In the early 1960s, Poindexter began playing the soprano sax as well.

He recorded with Eric Dolphy and Dexter Gordon on a session for Epic Records around 1962. From 1961 to 1964, Poindexter accompanied Lambert, Hendricks & Ross. In 1963, he moved to Paris, France, and recorded with Annie Ross. For eight years, he lived in Spain and then moved to Mannheim, Germany, before returning to the U.S. He published a memoir, titled The Pony Express. Memoirs of a Jazz Musician, in 1985.

== Discography ==
- Pony's Express (Epic, 1962)
- Pony Poindexter Plays the Big Ones (New Jazz, 1963)
- Gumbo! (New Jazz, 1963) with Booker Ervin
- Annie Ross & Pony Poindexter (Saba, 1966)
- Alto Summit (MPS, 1968)
- The Happy Life of Pony (Session, 1969)
- Pony Poindexter En Barcelona (Spiral, 1972 re-issue Wah Wah Records 2000)
- Poindexter (Inner City, 1976)

With Dexter Gordon

- Stella by Starlight (SteepleChase, 1966 [2005])

With Jon Hendricks

- A Good Git-Together (Pacific, 1959)

With Lambert, Hendricks & Ross

- The Hottest New Group in Jazz (Columbia, 1959–62)

With Wes Montgomery

- Far Wes (Pacific Jazz, 1958–59)
