= List of jazz contrafacts =

New jazz melodies based on the chords of existing compositions

In jazz, a contrafact is a musical composition built using the chord progression of a pre-existing piece, but with a new melody and arrangement. Typically the original tune's progression and song form will be reused but occasionally just a section will be reused in the new composition. The term comes from classical music and was first applied to jazz by musicologists in the 1970s and 1980s.

Contrafacts by notable jazz artists include:

Contrafact	Year	Contrafact Composer	Original Song	Year	Original Composer
"100 Proof"		J J Johnson	"What Is This Thing Called Love?"	1929	Cole Porter
"26-2"	1960	John Coltrane	"Confirmation"	1946	Charlie Parker
"317 East 32nd Street"	1952	Lennie Tristano	"Out of Nowhere"	1931	Johnny Green
"52nd Street Theme"	1944	Thelonious Monk	"I Got Rhythm"	1930	George Gershwin
"Ablution"		Lennie Tristano	"All the Things You Are"	1939	Jerome Kern
"Air Mail Special"		Benny Goodman / Jimmy Mundy / Charlie Christian)	"I Got Rhythm" (different bridge)	1930	George Gershwin
"Ah-Leu-Cha"		Charlie Parker	"Honeysuckle Rose", "I Got Rhythm" (Bridge)	1930	Thomas "Fats" Waller, George Gershwin
"Ahma See Ya"	1961	Ted Curson	"Out Of Nowhere"	1931	Johnny Green
"All The Things You Could Be By Now If Sigmund Freud's Wife Was Your Mother"	1961	Charles Mingus	"All the Things You Are"	1939	Jerome Kern
"Allen's Alley"	c. 1946	Denzil Best	"I Got Rhythm"	1930	George Gershwin
"Almost"		David Baker	"I Got Rhythm"	1930	George Gershwin
"Anatomy"	1957	Mal Waldron	"All the Things You Are"	1939	Jerome Kern
"And I Do"	1985	Jim Hall	"I Should Care"	1944	Axel Stordahl and Paul Weston
"And She Remembers Me"	1954	Tal Farlow	"I'll Remember April"	1942	Gene de Paul
"Anthropology / Thriving on a Riff"	1945	Charlie Parker and Dizzy Gillespie	"I Got Rhythm"	1930	George Gershwin
"Apache Dance"	1978	George Coleman	"Cherokee"	1938	Ray Noble
"Apple Honey"		Woody Herman	"I Got Rhythm"	1930	George Gershwin
"Apple Jump		Dexter Gordon	"I Got Rhythm"	1930	George Gershwin
"As I Live and Bop"		Stan Getz	"Confirmation"	1946	Charlie Parker
"Back Home in Brooklyn with Donna"	2009	Arun Luthra	"Back Home Again in Indiana"	1917	James F. Hanley
"Background Music"	1955	Warne Marsh	"All of Me"	1931	Gerald Marks, Seymour Simons
"Barry's Bop"	1947	Fats Navarro	"What Is This Thing Called Love?"	1929	Cole Porter
"Be A Good Girl"		Coleman Hawkins, Kenny Clarke	"Oh, Lady Be Good!"	1924	George Gershwin
"Bean and the Boys"	1948	Coleman Hawkins	"Lover, Come Back to Me"	1928	Sigmund Romberg
"Bebop Romp"	1947	Fats Navarro	"Fine and Dandy"	1930	Kay Swift
"Beep Durple"	1965	Carmell Jones	"Deep Purple"	1933	Peter DeRose
"Because of Guns"	2003	Vijay Iyer	"Hey Joe"	1962	Billy Roberts
"Bike Up The Strand"	1956	Gerry Mulligan	"Strike Up The Band"	1927	George Gershwin
"Birdland Stomp"	1987	Herb Geller	"Stompin' at the Savoy"	1934	Edgar Sampson
"Bird Gets the Worm"	1947	Charlie Parker	"Lover, Come Back to Me"	1928	Sigmund Romberg
"Blue Boy"	1947	Lennie Tristano	"Fine and Dandy"	1930	Kay Swift
"Blue Serge"	1946	Serge Chaloff	"Cherokee"	1938	Ray Noble
"Blue's Theme"	1966	Blue Mitchell	"I Got Rhythm"	1930	George Gershwin
"Boneology"	1947	J. J. Johnson	"Robbins’ Nest"	1947	Illinois Jacquet
"Bop City"		Kai Winding	"I Got Rhythm" (different bridge)	1930	George Gershwin
"Bop Kick"		Nat King Cole	"I Got Rhythm"	1930	George Gershwin
"Boperation"		Fats Navarro / Howard McGhee	"I Got Rhythm" (different bridge)	1930	George Gershwin
"Boppin' A Riff"		Sonny Stitt	"I Got Rhythm"	1930	George Gershwin
"Boston Bernie"	1969	Dexter Gordon	"All the Things You Are"	1939	Jerome Kern
"The Bridge"	1962	Sonny Rollins	"I Got Rhythm"	1930	George Gershwin
"Bright Mississippi"	1961	Thelonious Monk	"Sweet Georgia Brown"	1925	Ben Bernie, Maceo Pinkard
"Brown Gold"		Art Pepper	"I Got Rhythm"	1930	George Gershwin
"Brownie Speaks"		Clifford Brown	"I Got Rhythm" (Altered A section)	1930	George Gershwin
"Brown Skins"	1953	Gigi Gryce	"Cherokee"	1938	Ray Noble
"Bud's Bubble"		Bud Powell	"I Got Rhythm"	1930	George Gershwin
"Byas a Drink"		Don Byas	"Stompin' at the Savoy"	1934	Edgar Sampson
"Call the Police"		Nat King Cole	"I Got Rhythm"	1930	George Gershwin
"Calling Dr Jazz"		Eddie Lockjaw Davis	"I Got Rhythm"	1930	George Gershwin
"Capuchin Swing"	1960	Jackie McLean	"Star Eyes"	1943	Don Raye, Gene de Paul
"Cardboard"	1949	Charlie Parker	"Don't Take Your Love From Me"	1941	Henry Nemo
"Casbah"		Tadd Dameron	"Out of Nowhere"	1931	Johnny Green
"Celia"		Bud Powell	"I Got Rhythm"	1930	George Gershwin
"Chant of the Groove"		Coleman Hawkins	"I Got Rhythm"	1930	George Gershwin
"Charge Account"		Lambert / Stewart	"All the Things You Are"	1939	Jerome Kern
Charlie's Wig	1947	Charlie Parker	"When I Grow Too Old to Dream"	1934	Oscar Hammerstein, Sigmund Romberg
"The Chase"		Dexter Gordon	"I Got Rhythm" (different bridge)	1930	George Gershwin
"Chasin' the Bird"	1947	Charlie Parker	"I Got Rhythm"	1930	George Gershwin
"Chasm"		Julian Adderley	"I Got Rhythm"	1930	George Gershwin
"Cheers"		Charlie Parker	"I Got Rhythm"	1930	George Gershwin
"Chick's Tune"		Chick Corea	"You Stepped Out of a Dream"	1940	Nacio Herb Brown
"Chile Pepper"		Art Pepper	"Tea For Two"	1924	Vincent Youmans and Irving Caesar
"Chippie"		Ornette Coleman	"I Got Rhythm"	1930	George Gershwin
"Christmas Eve"		Slide Hampton	"I Got Rhythm" (different bridge)	1930	George Gershwin
"Citrus Season"		Ronnie Ball	"Limehouse Blues"	1921	Philip Braham
"Chronology"	1959	Ornette Coleman	"I Got Rhythm"	1930	George Gershwin
"Cindy's Tune"		Pepper Adams	"Honeysuckle Rose"	1928	Fats Waller
"Clifford's Axe"		Clifford Brown	"The Man I Love"	1930	George Gershwin
"Cochise"		Alvin Batiste	"Cherokee"	1938	Ray Noble
"Coffee Pot"		J. J. Johnson	"All God's Chillun Got Rhythm"	1937	Bronislaw Kaper, Walter Jurmann, Gus Kahn
"Cohn Pone"		Al Cohn, Nick Travis	"Get Happy"	1930	Harold Arlen
"Compulsion"		Miles Davis	"I Got Rhythm" (different bridge)	1930	George Gershwin
"Confirmation"	1945	Charlie Parker	"Twilight Time"	1945	Al Nevins, Buck Ram
"Confab With Rab"		Johnny Hodges	"I Got Rhythm"	1930	George Gershwin
"Constellation"	1948	Charlie Parker	"I Got Rhythm"	1930	George Gershwin
"Contrafact"	2018	Walter Smith III	"Like Someone In Love"	1944	Jimmy Van Heusen
"Cookie"		Bill Russo	"Oh, Lady Be Good!"	1924	George Gershwin
"Coolie Rini"		Howard McGhee	"I Got Rhythm"	1930	George Gershwin
"Coppin' The Bop"		J J Johnson	"I Got Rhythm"	1930	George Gershwin
"Cottontail" (alt. "Cotton Tail" and "Hot Chocolate")	1940	Duke Ellington	"I Got Rhythm"	1930	George Gershwin
"Could Ja"		Carey / Fisher	"I Got Rhythm" (different bridge)	1930	George Gershwin
"Countdown"		John Coltrane	"Tune Up"	1953	Miles Davis
"Coupe de Ville"		Mike Stern	"There Is No Greater Love"	1936	Isham Jones
"Crazeology" (aka Little Benny)		Benny Harris	"I Got Rhythm" (A section altered)	1930	George Gershwin
"CTA"		Jimmy Heath	"I Got Rhythm" (A section altered, different bridge)	1930	George Gershwin
Cuban Holiday		Lawrence Wooten	"Honeysuckle Rose"	1928	Fats Waller
"Dear John"	1990	Freddie Hubbard	"Giant Steps"	1959	John Coltrane
"Deception"	1950	Miles Davis	"Conception"	1950	George Shearing
"Deep People"		Jimmy Guiffre	"A Foggy Day"	1937	George Gershwin
"Delerium"		Tadd Dameron	"I Got Rhythm"	1930	George Gershwin
"Deliberation"		Lennie Tristano	"Back Home Again in Indiana"	1917	James F. Hanley
"Deltitnu"	1954	Gigi Gryce	"I Got Rhythm"	1930	George Gershwin
"Denial"		Miles Davis	"Confirmation"	1946	Charlie Parker
"Dewey Square"	1947	Charlie Parker	"Oh, Lady Be Good!"	1924	George Gershwin
"Dexter's Cuttin' Out"		Dexter Gordon	"I Got Rhythm" (different bridge)	1930	George Gershwin
"Dexter's Deck"		Dexter Gordon	"I Got Rhythm"	1930	George Gershwin
"Dexter Digs In"		Dexter Gordon	"I Got Rhythm" (different bridge)	1930	George Gershwin
"Dexterity"	1947	Charlie Parker	"I Got Rhythm"	1930	George Gershwin
"Dextivity"	1947	Tadd Dameron	"Take the "A" Train"	1939	Billy Strayhorn
"Dextrose"	1947	Tadd Dameron	"Fine and Dandy"	1930	Kay Swift
"Dig" aka "Donna"	1951	Miles Davis	"Sweet Georgia Brown"	1925	Ben Bernie, Maceo Pinkard
"Diggin' Diz"		Dizzy Gillespie	"Lover"	1932	Richard Rodgers
"Disappointed"		Eddie Jefferson	"Oh, Lady Be Good!"	1924	George Gershwin
"Dixie's Dilemma"	1957	Warne Marsh	"All The Things You Are"	1939	Jerome Kern
"Dixie Jamboree"		Nat King Cole	"I Got Rhythm" (different bridge)	1930	George Gershwin
"Dizzy Atmosphere"	1945	Dizzy Gillespie	"I Got Rhythm" (different bridge)	1930	George Gershwin
"Do You Hear the Voices You Left Behind?"		John McLaughlin	"Giant Steps"	1959	John Coltrane
"Doin' The Bow Wow"		Nat King Cole	"I Got Rhythm" (different bridge)	1930	George Gershwin
"Donna Lee"	1947	Miles Davis	"Back Home Again in Indiana"	1917	James F. Hanley
"Don't Be That Way"	1938	Benny Goodman, Edgar Sampson, Mitchell Parish	"I Got Rhythm"	1930	George Gershwin
"Dorothy"		Howard McGhee	"I Got Rhythm"	1930	George Gershwin
"Dot's Groovy"		Bob Gordon	"I Got Rhythm"	1930	George Gershwin
"Double Date"		Pete Rugolo	"Fine and Dandy"	1930	Kay Swift
"Doujie"		Wes Montgomery	"Confirmation"	1946	Charlie Parker
"Down for the Double"		Freddie Green	"I Got Rhythm"	1930	George Gershwin
"Doxy"	1957	Sonny Rollins	"Ja-Da" - partly	1918	Bob Carleton
"Dream Step"		Dick Oatts	"You Stepped Out of a Dream"	1940	Nacio Herb Brown
"Dream Stepper"		Lee Konitz	"You Stepped Out of a Dream"	1940	Nacio Herb Brown
"The Duel"		Dexter Gordon	"I Got Rhythm"	1930	George Gershwin
"E. T. A."		Bobby Watson	"Lazy Bird"	1958	John Coltrane
"Ear Conditioning"		Ronnie Ball	"Look For The Silver Lining"	1919	Jerome Kern
"East Thirty-Second"		Lennie Tristano	"Pennies from Heaven"	1936	Arthur Johnston
"Eb"		Nat King Cole	"I Got Rhythm" (different bridge)	1930	George Gershwin
"Eb Pob"		Fats Navarro / Leo Parker	"I Got Rhythm"	1930	George Gershwin
"The Eternal Triangle"	1957	Sonny Stitt	"I Got Rhythm" (different bridge)	1930	George and Ira Gershwin
"Euphoria"		Charlie Ventura, Roy Kral	"'S Wonderful"	1927	George Gershwin
"Everything's Cool"	1946	Sonny Stitt, Walter Fuller	"I Got Rhythm"	1930	George Gershwin
"Evidence"		Thelonious Monk	"Just You, Just Me"	1929	Jesse Greer
"Exotica"		John Coltrane	"I Can't Get Started"	1936	Vernon Duke
"Ezz-Thetic"	1957	George Russell	"Love for Sale"	1930	Cole Porter
"Fat Girl"		Fats Navarro	"I Got Rhythm"	1930	George Gershwin
"Father Knickerbopper"		Tiny Kahn	"I Got Rhythm" (different bridge)	1930	George Gershwin
"Father Steps in"		Dixon / Randall / Hines / Fox	"I Got Rhythm"	1930	George Gershwin
"Fats Blows"	1947	Fats Navarro	"Oh, Lady Be Good!"	1924	George Gershwin
"Feather Bed"		Ted Brown	"You'd Be So Nice to Come Home To"	1943	Cole Porter
"Fifth Avenue"		John Coltrane	"What Is This Thing Called Love?"	1929	Cole Porter
"Fifth House"		John Coltrane	"What Is This Thing Called Love?"	1929	Cole Porter
"Finger Poppin'"	1959	Horace Silver	"I Got Rhythm"	1930	George Gershwin
"Five Brothers"		Gerry Mulligan	"I Got Rhythm" (different bridge)	1930	George Gershwin
"Flash"		Harry James	"Oh, Lady Be Good!"	1924	George Gershwin
"Flat Black"		J J Johnson	"What Is This Thing Called Love?"	1929	Cole Porter
"Flintstones Theme"	1961	Hoyt Curtin	"I Got Rhythm"	1930	George Gershwin
"Flossie Lou"		Tadd Dameron	"Jeepers Creepers"	1938	Harry Warren
"Flyin' Home"		Lionel Hampton, Benny Goodman	"I Got Rhythm" (different bridge)	1930	George Gershwin
"For Hecklers Only"		Ray Brown / Gil Fuller	"I Got Rhythm" (different bridge)	1930	George Gershwin
"For Regulars Only"		Dexter Gordon	"I Got Rhythm"	1930	George Gershwin
"Four Brothers"	1947	Jimmy Giuffre	"Jeepers Creepers"	1938	Harry Warren
"Four On Six"	1960	Wes Montgomery	"Summertime"	1934	George Gershwin
"The Fox Hunt"		Maynard Ferguson	"I Got Rhythm"	1930	George Gershwin
"The Fox Hunt"		Mike Abene	"Oh, Lady Be Good!"	1924	George Gershwin
"Frantic Fancies"		Bud Powell	"Strike Up The Band"	1927	George Gershwin
"Free"		Ornette Coleman	"I Got Rhythm"	1930	George Gershwin
"Freight Trane"	1958	Tommy Flanagan	"Blues for Alice"	1951	Charlie Parker
"Fried Bananas"	1969	Dexter Gordon	"It Could Happen to You"	1944	Jimmy Van Heusen
"Froggy Day"		Lennie Tristano	"Pennies from Heaven"	1936	Arthur Johnston
"From the Start"	2023	Laufey	"Jeepers Creepers" (A section)	1938	Harry Warren
"Fungi Mama"		Blue Mitchell	"I Got Rhythm"	1930	George Gershwin
"Fuchsia Swing Song"	1965	Sam Rivers	"Night And Day"	1932	Cole Porter
"Futurity"		Gigi Gryce	"There Will Never Be Another You"	1942	Harry Warren
"Garage Band"		Arun Luthra	"How About You?"	1941	Burton Lane
"Get It"	1957	Bud Powell	"Love Me or Leave Me"	1928	Walter Donaldson
"Getting Together"		Charles Mingus	"All The Things You Are"	1939	Jerome Kern
"Goin' To Minton's"		Fats Navarro	"I Got Rhythm"	1930	George Gershwin
"Good Bait"	1944	Tadd Dameron, Count Basie	"I Got Rhythm" different bridge	1930	George Gershwin
"Good Queen Bess"		Duke Ellington	"I Got Rhythm"	1930	George Gershwin
"The Goof and I"		Al Cohn	"I Got Rhythm"	1930	George Gershwin
"The Green Street Caper"	1981	Woody Shaw	"On Green Dolphin Street"	1947	Bronislau Kaper
"Green Is Mean"	1990	Brian Lynch	"On Green Dolphin Street"	1947	Bronislau Kaper
"Groovin' High"	1945	Dizzy Gillespie	"Whispering"	1920	Vincent Rose
"Hackensack"		Thelonious Monk	"Oh, Lady Be Good!"	1924	George Gershwin
"Half Nelson"	1947	Miles Davis	"Lady Bird"	1939	Tadd Dameron
"Hamp's Paws"		Hampton Hawes	"I Got Rhythm"	1930	George Gershwin
"Hanid"	1958	Coleman Hawkins	"Dinah (song)"	1925	Harry Akst
"Harlem Swing"		Nat King Cole	"I Got Rhythm"	1930	George Gershwin
Hashimoto Blues		Flip Phillips	"Limehouse Blues"	1921	Philip Braham
"Hesitation"	1982	Wynton Marsalis	"I Got Rhythm"	1930	George Gershwin
"Hi Beck"		Lee Konitz	"Pennies from Heaven"	1936	Arthur Johnston
"Hip Hip Hooray"		Nat King Cole	"I Got Rhythm" (different bridge)	1930	George Gershwin
"Hit That Jive, Jack"		Skeets Tolbert	"I Got Rhythm" (different bridge)	1930	George Gershwin
"Hollerin' and Screamin'"		Eddie Lockjaw Davis	"I Got Rhythm"	1930	George Gershwin
"Home Cookin'"		Charlie Parker	"'S Wonderful"	1927	George Gershwin
"Hot House"	1945	Tadd Dameron	"What Is This Thing Called Love?"	1929	Cole Porter
"Hoy Soy"		Nat King Cole	"I Got Rhythm" (different bridge)	1930	George Gershwin
"I Didn't"	1955	Miles Davis	"Well, You Needn't"	1944	Thelonious Monk
"I Hate You"	1977	Tete Montoliu	"I Love You"	1944	Cole Porter
"I Know"		Sonny Rollins	"Confirmation"	1946	Charlie Parker
"I Want More"	1960	Dexter Gordon	"All the Things You Are"	1939	Jerome Kern
"I'm An Errand Boy For Rhythm"		Nat King Cole	"I Got Rhythm"	1930	George Gershwin
"Ice Freezes Red"	1947	Fats Navarro	"Back Home Again in Indiana"	1917	James F. Hanley
"I'm Boppin' Too"		Lorraine Gillespie	"I Got Rhythm" (different bridge)	1930	George Gershwin
"Impressions"	1961	John Coltrane	"So What"	1959	Miles Davis
"In a Mellow Tone"	1939	Duke Ellington	"Rose Room"	1917	Art Hickman, Harry Williams
"In A Rush"		James Moody	"Oh, Lady Be Good!"	1924	George Gershwin
"In F"	2011	Steve Swallow	"I Love You"	1944	Cole Porter
"In Walked Bud"	1947	Thelonious Monk	"Blue Skies"	1926	Irving Berlin
"In Walked Horace"		J J Johnson	"I Got Rhythm"	1930	George Gershwin
"Indiana Winter"		Feather / Winter	"How High the Moon"	1940	Morgan Lewis
"Infinity Promenade"		Shorty Rogers	"Good Bait"	1944	Tadd Dameron
"Infra Rae"	1956	Hank Mobley	"Softly, as in a Morning Sunrise"	1928	Sigmund Romberg
"The Injuns"		Donald Byrd	"Cherokee"	1938	Ray Noble
"Insensatez"	1963	Antônio Carlos Jobim	"Prelude, Op. 28, No. 4 (Chopin)"	1942	Frédéric Chopin
"Insight"		Billy Harper	"Autumn Leaves"	1945	Joseph Kosma
"Intuition"		Ted Brown	"Play, Fiddle, Play"	1947	Emery Deutsch, Arthur Altman
"Intoit"		Stan Getz	"A Night in Tunisia"	1942	Dizzy Gillespie
"It's You"	1996	Lee Konitz	"It's You or No One"	1963	Jule Styne
"I've Changed"	2017	Gary Smulyan	"You've Changed"	1941	Bill Carey, Carl Fischer
"I Was Doing All Right"		George Gershwin	"I Got Rhythm" (different bridge)	1930	George Gershwin
"Jack Sprat"	1958	Sonny Stitt	"Blues for Alice"	1951	Charlie Parker
"Jahbero"		Tadd Dameron	"All the Things You Are"	1939	Jerome Kern
"Jam Man"		Marty Greene	"I Got Rhythm" (altered A section)	1930	George Gershwin
"Jay Bird"	1946	J. J. Johnson	"I Got Rhythm"	1930	George Gershwin
"Jay Jay"	1946	J. J. Johnson	"I Got Rhythm"	1930	George Gershwin
"Jayne"		Ornette Coleman	"Out of Nowhere"	1931	Johnny Green
"The Jeep Is Jumpin'"		Duke Ellington	"I Got Rhythm"	1930	George Gershwin
"Ju-Ju"		Lennie Tristano	"Back Home Again in Indiana"	1917	Ballard MacDonald, James F. Hanley
"Judy"		Lennie Tristano	"Don't Blame Me"		Jimmy Van Heusen
"Jug Handle"		Gene Ammons	"I Got Rhythm"	1930	George Gershwin
"Juggernaut"		Gene Ammons	"I Got Rhythm"	1930	George Gershwin
"Juggin' Around"		Frank Foster	"I Got Rhythm"	1930	George Gershwin
"Jumpin' at the Woodside"		Count Basie	"I Got Rhythm"	1930	George Gershwin
"Jumpin' with the Mop"		Nat King Cole	"I Got Rhythm" (different bridge)	1930	George Gershwin
"Juicy Lucy"		Horace Silver	"Confirmation"	1946	Charlie Parker
"Kamman's A' Comin'"		Oscar Pettiford	"I Got Rhythm"	1930	George Gershwin
"The Kangaroo"	1953	Les Paul	"Stompin' at the Savoy"	1934	Edgar Sampson
"Kary's Trance"		Lee Konitz	"Play, Fiddle, Play"	1947	Emery Deutsch, Arthur Altman
"Keen and Peachy"	1947	Burns / Rogers	"Fine and Dandy"	1930	Kay Swift
"Kicks"		Nat King Cole	"Honeysuckle Rose"	1928	Fats Waller
"Kokochee"		Teddy Charles	"Cherokee"	1938	Ray Noble
"Leapin' At The Lincoln"		Charlie Barnet	"Oh, Lady Be Good!"	1924	George Gershwin
"Lee's Dream"		Fred Hersch	"You Stepped Out of a Dream"	1940	Nacio Herb Brown
"Lemon Drop"		George Wallington	"I Got Rhythm"	1930	George Gershwin
"Lennie-Bird"		Lennie Tristano	"How High the Moon"	1940	Morgan Lewis
"Lennie's Pennies"		Lennie Tristano	"Pennies from Heaven"	1936	Arthur Johnston
"Lester Blows Again"		Lester Young	"Honeysuckle Rose"	1928	Fats Waller
"Lester Leaps In"	1939	Lester Young	"I Got Rhythm"	1930	George Gershwin
"Let's Call This"		Thelonious Monk	"Honeysuckle Rose"	1929	Fats Waller
"Lex"	1960	Donald Byrd	“But Not For Me”	1930	George and Ira Gershwin
"Liberia"	1964	John Coltrane	"A Night in Tunisia"	1941	Dizzy Gillespie
"Lila Mae"		Nat King Cole	"I Got Rhythm"	1930	George Gershwin
"Little Benny" (aka "Crazeology", "Bud's Bubble")		Benny Harris	"I Got Rhythm"	1930	George Gershwin
"Little Man On The White Keys"		Nat King Cole	"I Got Rhythm"	1930	George Gershwin
"Little Quail"		Ted Brown	"I'll Remember April"	1942	Gene de Paul
"Little Rootie Tootie"		Thelonious Monk	"I Got Rhythm"	1930	George Gershwin
"Little Willie Leaps"	1947	Miles Davis	"All God's Chillun Got Rhythm"	1937	Bronislaw Kaper, Walter Jurmann, Gus Kahn
"Lollypop"		Shorty Rogers / Terry Gibbs	"I Got Rhythm" (different bridge)	1930	George Gershwin
"Love You Madly"		Duke Ellington	"I Got Rhythm"	1930	George Gershwin
"Lucky Strike"		Elmo Hope	"Strike Up The Band"	1927	George Gershwin
"Lullaby of Birdland"	1952	George Shearing	"Love Me or Leave Me"	1928	Walter Donaldson
"Luminescence"		Barry Harris	"How High the Moon"	1940	Morgan Lewis
"Mad Be Bop"	1946	J. J. Johnson	"Just You, Just Me"	1929	Jesse Greer
"The Man from Hyde Park"		Harold Mabern	"The Song Is You"	1932	Jerome Kern
"Marmaduke"	1948	Charlie Parker	"Honeysuckle Rose"	1928	Fats Waller
"Marshmallow"		Warne Marsh	"Cherokee"	1938	Ray Noble
"Mayreh"		Horace Silver	"All God's Chillun Got Rhythm"	1937	Bronislaw Kaper, Walter Jurmann
"Merry-Go-Round"	1948	Charlie Parker	A "I Got Rhythm" B "Honeysuckle Rose"	A 1929 B 1930	A George Gershwin B Fats Waller
"Meteor"	1956	Tal Farlow	"Confirmation"	1946	Charlie Parker
"Minor March"		Jackie McLean	"Love Me or Leave Me"	1928	Walter Donaldson
"Minor's Holiday"		Kenny Durham	"Love Me or Leave Me"	1928	Walter Donaldson
"Mirror Lake"		Idrees Sulieman	"Wave"	1967	Antônio Carlos Jobim
"Miss Thing"		Count Basie	"I Got Rhythm"	1930	George Gershwin
"Monk/Trane"	2009	John Patitucci	"Giant Steps"	1959	John Coltrane
"Moodamorphosis"		Gil Fuller, Dave Burns	"Oh, Lady Be Good!"	1924	George Gershwin
"Moody Speaks"		James Moody / Dave Burns	"I Got Rhythm"	1930	George Gershwin
"Moody's Got Rhythm"		James Moody	"I Got Rhythm"	1930	George Gershwin
"Moose the Mooche"	1946	Charlie Parker	"I Got Rhythm"	1930	George Gershwin
"Mop Mop"	1942	Kenny Clarke, Ike QuebecKorall, Burt (2002). Drummin' Men: The Heartbeat of Jazz The Bebop Years. New York: Oxford University Press. p. 80. ISBN 0-19-514812-6.	"I Got Rhythm"	1930	George Gershwin
"More Moon"		Shorty Rogers	"How High the Moon"	1940	Morgan Lewis
"Moten Swing"	1932	Bennie Moten, Buster Moten, Count Basie, Eddie Durham	"You're Driving Me Crazy"	1930	Walter Donaldson
"Motion"	1954	Jimmy Raney	"You Stepped Out of a Dream"	1940	Nacio Herb Brown, Gus Kahn
"Move"		Denzil Best	"I Got Rhythm" (different bridge)	1930	George Gershwin
"My Little Suede Shoes"	1951	Charlie Parker	A "Pedro Gomez" B "Le Petit Cireur Noir		Henri Giraud (both)
"Naptown U.S.A."		J J Johnson	"Back Home Again in Indiana"	1917	James F. Hanley
"Never Felt That Way Before"		Sonny Stitt	"All God's Chillun Got Rhythm"	1937	Bronislaw Kaper, Walter Jurmann, Gus Kahn
"New Wheels"		Mulgrew Miller	"I Got Rhythm"	1930	George Gershwin
"Newk's Fadeaway"		Sonny Rollins	"I Got Rhythm"	1930	George Gershwin
"Night at Tony’s, A"	1953	Gigi Gryce	“Yardbird Suite”	1940	Charlie Parker
"Night on Bop Mountain"		Kai Winding	"Love Me or Leave Me"	1928	Walter Donaldson
"No Figs"		Lennie Tristano	"Back Home Again in Indiana"	1917	James F. Hanley
"No Moe"		Sonny Rollins	"I Got Rhythm" (different bridge)	1930	George Gershwin
"No Splice"		Lee Konitz	"You'd Be So Nice to Come Home To"	1943	Cole Porter
"Northwest Passage"		Woody Herman / Jackson / Burns	"I Got Rhythm"	1930	George Gershwin
"Nostalgia"		Fats Navarro	"Out of Nowhere"	1931	Johnny Green
"Not You Again"		John Scofield	"There Will Never Be Another You"	1942	Harry Warren
"Now He Beats The Drum, Now He Stops"		Chick Corea	"How Deep Is The Ocean"	1932	Irving Berlin
"Off the Cuff"		Jim McNeely	"It's You or No One"	1963	Jule Styne
"O Go Mo"		Sonny Rollins	"I Got Rhythm"	1930	George Gershwin
"Oleo"	1945	Sonny Rollins	"I Got Rhythm"	1930	George Gershwin
"Omicron"	1956	Donald Byrd	"Woody'n You"	1943	Dizzy Gillespie
"On a Misty Night"		Tadd Dameron	"September in the Rain"	1937	Harry Warren
"On The Minute"	1961	Jon Eardley	"Love Me or Leave Me (Donaldson and Kahn song)"	1928	Walter Donaldson
"On The Scene"		Dizzy Gillespie	"I Got Rhythm"	1930	George Gershwin
"One Bass Hit"		Dizzy Gillespie	"I Got Rhythm"	1930	George Gershwin
"One Liners"		Mike Stern	"Softly, as in a Morning Sunrise"	1928	Sigmund Romberg
"One Night Stan"	2016	Alison Young	"I Got Rhythm"	1930	George Gershwin
"Oop-Bop-Sha-Bam		Dizzy Gillespie	"I Got Rhythm"	1930	George Gershwin
"Opus Caprice"		Al Haig	"I Got Rhythm"	1930	George Gershwin
"Or Come Fog"	1990	Don Grolnick	"Come Rain or Come Shine"	1946	Harold Arlen
"Ornithology"	1946	Charlie Parker, Benny Harris	"How High the Moon"	1940	Morgan Lewis
"An Oscar for Treadwell"	1950	Charlie Parker	"I Got Rhythm"	1930	George Gershwin
"Out a Day"		Franck Amsallem	"Night and Day"	1932	Cole Porter
"Out of the Blue"	1951	Miles Davis	"Get Happy"	1930	Harold Arlen
"Overtime"		Pete Rugolo	"Love Me or Leave Me"	1928	Walter Donaldson
"Ow!"	1947	Dizzy Gillespie	"I Got Rhythm"	1930	George Gershwin
"Palo Alto"		Lee Konitz	"Strike Up The Band"	1927	George Gershwin
"Parisian Thoroughfare"	1951	Bud Powell	"Between the Devil and the Deep Blue Sea"	1931	Harold Arlen
"Parker 51"	1951	Jimmy Raney	"Cherokee"	1938	Ray Noble
"Passport"	1949	Charlie Parker	"I Got Rhythm"	1930	George Gershwin
"Pennie Packer"		Ronnie Ball	"Pennies from Heaven"	1936	Arthur Johnston
"Plain Jane"		Sonny Rollins	"Honeysuckle Rose"	1928	Fats Waller
"Pogo Stick Bounce"		Eden Abhez	"I Got Rhythm"	1930	George Gershwin
"Pooch McGooch"		Bill Russo	"Somebody Loves Me"	1924	George Gershwin
"Prince Albert"		Kenny Dorham	"All the Things You Are"	1939	Jerome Kern
"Professor Bop"		Babs Gonzales	"I Got Rhythm" (different bridge)	1930	George Gershwin
"The Protagonist"		Jack Cooper	"Lover"	1932	Richard Rodgers
"Psalm"		Jimmy Halperin	"Darn That Dream"	1939	Jimmy Van Heusen
"Quasimodo"	1947	Charlie Parker	"Embraceable You"	1928	George Gershwin
"Quicksilver"		Horace Silver	"Lover, Come Back to Me"	1928	Sigmund Romberg
"Raeba"		Jimmy Halperin	"I Didn't Know What Time It Was"	1939	Richard Rodgers
"Raid The Joint"		Erskine Hawkins	"I Got Rhythm"	1930	George Gershwin
"Re-Re"		Bob Mintzer	"Back Home Again in Indiana"	1917	Ballard MacDonald, James F. Hanley
"Red Cross"	1944	Charlie Parker	"I Got Rhythm"	1930	George Gershwin
"The Red Tornado"		Red Rodney	"Cherokee"	1938	Ray Noble
"Red Wig"		Red Rodney	"Strike Up The Band"	1927	George Gershwin
"Reets and I"	1958	Benny Harris	"All God's Chillun Got Rhythm"	1937	Bronislaw Kaper, Walter Jurmann, Gus Kahn
"Relaxin' With Lee"	1950	Charlie Parker	"Stompin' at the Savoy"	1934	Edgar Sampson
"Reunion" aka"Salute to Birdland" / "Salute to the Bandbox"	1954	Gigi Gryce	"I'll Remember April"	1942	Gene de Paul
"Rhodomagnetics"		Wilbur Harden	"Take the "A" Train"	1939	Billy Strayhorn
"Rhythm-a-Ning"	1957	Thelonious Monk	"I Got Rhythm"	1930	George Gershwin
"Rhythm In A Riff"		Billy Eckstine	"I Got Rhythm"	1930	George Gershwin
"Rhythm Sam"		Nat King Cole	"I Got Rhythm"	1930	George Gershwin
"Rifftide"		Coleman Hawkins	"Oh, Lady Be Good!"	1924	George Gershwin
"Rocker"	1950	Gerry Mulligan	"Sleigh Ride"	1948	Leroy Anderson
"Room 608"		Horace Silver	"I Got Rhythm" (different bridge)	1930	George Gershwin
"Round House"		Gerry Mulligan	“Out of Nowhere”	1931	Johnny Green
"Salt Peanuts"	1942	Dizzy Gillespie	"I Got Rhythm"	1930	George Gershwin
"Salute to the Band Box"		Gigi Gryce	"I'll Remember April"	1942	Gene de Paul
"San Souci" aka "Sans Souci"	1955	Gigi Gryce	“Out of Nowhere”	1931	Johnny Green
"Satellite"	1964	John Coltrane	"How High the Moon"	1940	Morgan Lewis
"Sax of a Kind"		Lee Konitz, Warne Marsh	"Fine and Dandy"	1930	Kay Swift
"Scotchin' The Soda"		W. Jack Riley	"I Got Rhythm" (different bridge)	1930	George Gershwin
"Scrapple from the Apple"	1947	Charlie Parker	"Honeysuckle Rose"; bridge "I Got Rhythm"	1929	Fats Waller, George Gershwin
"Second Balcony Jump"		Jerry Valentine	"I Got Rhythm"	1930	George Gershwin
"Segment"	1949	Charlie Parker	"I Got Rhythm"	1930	George Gershwin
"Serenade to a Square"		Bud Powell	"Cherokee"	1938	Ray Noble
"Serene"		Eric Dolphy	"Tenderly"	1946	Walter Gross, Jack Lawrence
"The Serpent's Tooth"		Jimmy Heath, later self-attributed by Miles Davis	"I Got Rhythm" (different bridge)	1930	George Gershwin
"Settin' The Pace"		Dexter Gordon	"I Got Rhythm" (different bridge)	1930	George Gershwin
"Seven, Come Eleven"		Charlie Christian, Benny Goodman	"I Got Rhythm"	1930	George Gershwin
"Shag"		Sidney Bechet	"I Got Rhythm"	1930	George Gershwin
"Shawnee"		Buddy Rich	"Cherokee"	1938	Ray Noble
"Shaw 'Nuff"	1945	Charlie Parker, Dizzy Gillespie	"I Got Rhythm"	1930	George Gershwin
"She Rote"	1951	Charlie Parker	"Beyond the Blue Horizon"	1930	Richard A. Whiting
"Shelley"		Red Rodney	"Rosetta"	1939	Earl Hines
"Shoo Shoo Baby"		Phil Moore	"I Got Rhythm"	1930	George Gershwin
"Smog Eyes"	1956	Ted Brown	"There Will Never Be Another You"	1942	Harry Warren
"Smoke Signal	1955	Gigi Gryce	“Lover” (modified)	1932	Richard Rodgers
"Smokey Joe"		Van Phillips / Emil Ascher	"I Got Rhythm" (different bridge)	1930	George Gershwin
"So Sorry Please"		Bud Powell	"I Got Rhythm" (different bridge)	1930	George Gershwin
"Soflee"	1992	Gene Bertoncini	"Softly, as in a Morning Sunrise"	1928	Sigmund Romberg
"Solid Potato Salad"		DePaul / Prince / Raye	"I Got Rhythm"	1930	George Gershwin
"Something Like a Bird"	1978	Charles Mingus	"Idaho"	1942	Jesse Stone
"Sonnyside"		Sonny Stitt	"I Got Rhythm"	1930	George Gershwin
"Split Feelin's"	1960	Hank Mobley	"I Got Rhythm"	1930	George Gershwin
"Split Kick"	1951	Horace Silver	"There Will Never Be Another You"	1942	Harry Warren
"Spotlite"		Coleman Hawkins	"Just You, Just Me"	1929	Jesse Greer
"Spur of the Moment"		Charles Mingus	"'S Wonderful"	1927	George Gershwin
"Squatty Roo"		Johnny Hodges	"I Got Rhythm"	1930	George Gershwin
"Stan Getz Along"		Al Cohn	"'S Wonderful"	1927	George Gershwin
"Status Quo"		John Neely	"There Will Never Be Another You"	1942	Harry Warren
"Star Highs"	1982	Warne Marsh	"Star Eyes"	1943	Don Raye, Gene de Paul
"Stay On It"		Tadd Dameron	"I Got Rhythm"	1930	George Gershwin
"Steeplechase"	1948	Charlie Parker	"I Got Rhythm"	1930	George Gershwin
"Stop"		Don Lanphere	"Pennies from Heaven"	1936	Arthur Johnston
"Stop The Red Light's On"		Taps Miller	"I Got Rhythm" (different bridge)	1930	George Gershwin
"Stoptime"		Horace Silver	"Sweet Georgia Brown"	1925	Ben Bernie, Maceo Pinkard
"Straight Ahead"		Kenny Dorham	"I Got Rhythm"	1930	George Gershwin
"Straight Life"	1954	Art Pepper	"After You've Gone"	1918	Turner Layton
"Straighten Up and Fly Right"		Nat King Cole	"I Got Rhythm"	1930	George Gershwin
"The Street Beat"		C Thompson / Robert Mellin	"I Got Rhythm"	1930	George Gershwin
"Strictly Confidential"		Bud Powell	"I Got Rhythm"	1930	George Gershwin
"Striver's Row"	1957	Sonny Rollins	"Confirmation"	1946	Charlie Parker
"Stupendous"		Howard McGhee	"'S Wonderful"	1927	George Gershwin
"Sub-Atomic Dominant"		Jimmy Halperin	"Sweet Georgia Brown"	1925	Ben Bernie, Maceo Pinkard
"Suburban Eyes"	1947	Ike Quebec	"All God's Chillun Got Rhythm"	1937	Bronislaw Kaper, Walter Jurmann, Gus Kahn
"Subconscious Lee"		Lee Konitz	"What Is This Thing Called Love?"	1929	Cole Porter
"Suspone"		Mike Stern	"I Got Rhythm"	1930	George Gershwin
"Swedish Schnapps"	1951	Charlie Parker	"I Got Rhythm"	1930	George Gershwin
"Sweet Clifford"		Clifford Brown	"Sweet Georgia Brown"	1925	Ben Bernie, Maceo Pinkard
"Sweet Thing"		Rory Stuart	"In Your Own Sweet Way"	1955	Dave Brubeck
"Sweets"		Eddie Laguna, pseudonym of Nat King Cole.	"Oh, Lady Be Good!"	1924	George Gershwin
"Swing House"		Gerry Mulligan	"Sweet Georgia Brown"	1925	Ben Bernie, Maceo Pinkard
"Swing Spring"	1954	Miles Davis	"I Got Rhythm"	1930	George Gershwin
"Swingin' For Bumsy"	1954	Sonny Rollins	"I Got Rhythm" (different bridge)	1930	George Gershwin
"Swingin' With Diane"		Art Pepper	"I Got Rhythm"	1930	George Gershwin
"Symphonette"		Tadd Dameron	"I Got Rhythm" (different bridge)	1930	George Gershwin
"Syntax"		J J Johnson	"I Got Rhythm"	1930	George Gershwin
"Tadd's Delight"		Tadd Dameron	"But Not For Me"	1930	George Gershwin
"Tah-De-ah"		Nat King Cole	"I Got Rhythm"	1930	George Gershwin
"'TAin't What You Do"		Sy Oliver	"I Got Rhythm" (different bridge)	1930	George Gershwin
"Take 'em"		Nat King Cole	"I Got Rhythm" (different bridge)	1930	George Gershwin
"Tale Of The Fingers"		Paul Chambers	"Strike Up The Band"	1927	George Gershwin
"Tangibility"		Arun Luthra	"I Got Rhythm"	1930	George Gershwin
"Teapot"		J. J. Johnson	"Sweet Georgia Brown"	1925	Ben Bernie, Maceo Pinkard
"That's My Kick"	1967	Erroll Garner	"I Get A Kick Out Of You"	1934	Cole Porter
"The Theme"		Miles Davis	"I Got Rhythm"	1930	George Gershwin
"Theme for Penny"	1990	Javon Jackson	"Giant Steps"	1959	John Coltrane
"Thingin"	1996	Lee Konitz	"All the Things You Are"	1939	Jerome Kern
"Third Event"		Arun Luthra	"Giant Steps"	1959	John Coltrane
"Third Rail"		Michael Brecker	"I Got Rhythm" (different bridge)	1930	George Gershwin
"Tide""	1970	Antônio Carlos Jobim	"Wave	1967	Antônio Carlos Jobim
"Tippin'"	1956	Horace Silver	"I Got Rhythm"	1930	George Gershwin
"Tiptoe"		Thad Jones	"I Got Rhythm"	1930	George Gershwin
"Tollbridge"		Joe Gordon	"Oh, Lady Be Good!"	1924	George Gershwin
"Tony's Tune"		Tony Aless	"'S Wonderful"	1927	George Gershwin
"Tour De Force"		Dizzy Gillespie	"Jeepers Creepers"	1938	Harry Warren
"Transfiguration"	1956	Gigi Gryce	“Gone with the Wind (song)”	1937	Allie Wrubel
"Translation"	1956	Lucky Thompson	"What's New?""	1939	Bob Haggart
"Turnpike"		J J Johnson	"I Got Rhythm"	1930	George Gershwin
"Tuxedo Junction"		Erskine Hawkins	"I Got Rhythm" (different bridge)	1930	George Gershwin
"Twelve"	2000	Peter Erskine	"Easy to Love"	1934	Cole Porter
"Two Fathers"		James Moody	"Oh, Lady Be Good!"	1924	George Gershwin
"Two in Love"	2000	Jack Cooper	"I Love You"	1944	Cole Porter
"Up On Teddy's Hill"		Charlie Christian	"Honeysuckle Rose"	1928	Fats Waller
"Victory Ball"		Lennie Tristano, Billy Bauer, Charle Parker	"'S Wonderful"	1927	George Gershwin
"Visitation"	1956	Paul Chambers	"All God's Chillun Got Rhythm"	1937	Bronislaw Kaper, Walter Jurmann, Gus Kahn
"Vodka"		Mal Waldron	"Yesterdays"	1933	Jerome Kern
"Wail"		Bud Powell	"I Got Rhythm"	1930	George Gershwin
"Wake Up!"	1956	Gigi Gryce	“I Got Rhythm”	1930	George Gershwin
"Walk, Don't Run"	1954	Johnny Smith	"Softly, as in a Morning Sunrise"	1928	Sigmund Romberg
"Waltz New"		Jim Hall	"Someday My Prince Will Come"	1937	Frank Churchill
"Webb City"		Bud Powell	"I Got Rhythm"	1930	George Gershwin
"Wee" aka "Allen's Alley"	c. 1946	Denzil Best	"I Got Rhythm"	1930	George Gershwin
"Weeja"	1956	Elmo Hope	"Confirmation"	1946	Charlie Parker
"Wells Fargo"	1958	Wilbur Harden	"I Got Rhythm"	1930	George Gershwin
"Wendy"		Paul Desmond	"For All We Know"	1934	J. Fred Coots
"Westwood Walk"		Gerry Mulligan	"Fine and Dandy"	1930	Kay Swift
"Wham Bam Thank You Ma'am"	1961	Charles Mingus	"What Is This Thing Called Love?"	1929	Cole Porter
"What Love?"		Charles Mingus	"What Is This Thing Called Love?" and "You Don't Know What Love Is"	1929 / 1941	Cole Porter Gene De Paul
"Who's Who"		Art Farmer	"I Got Rhythm"	1930	George Gershwin
"Wiggly Walk"		Jacobs / Oppenheim / Palmer	"I Got Rhythm" (different bridge)	1930	George Gershwin
"Wire Brush Stomp"		Gene Krupa	"I Got Rhythm"	1930	George Gershwin
"Wolf Talk" aka "Wolf's Talk"	1955	Gigi Gryce	“I Got Rhythm”	1930	George Gershwin
"Wow"	1949	Lennie Tristano	"You Can Depend on Me"	1931	Charles Carpenter, Louis Dunlap, Earl Hines
"XYZ"		Budd Johnson	"I Got Rhythm"	1930	George Gershwin
"Yardbird Suite"	1940	Charlie Parker	"Rosetta", except measure two	1939	Earl Hines
"Yeah Man"		J Russel Robinson	"I Got Rhythm"	1930	George Gershwin
"Yellow Dolphin Street"	1977	Tete Montoliu	"On Green Dolphin Street"	1947	Bronislau Kaper
"Young Lee"		Lee Konitz	"All The Things You Are"	1939	Jerome Kern
"You Gotta Dig It to Dig It"		Donald Byrd	"Cherokee"	1938	Ray Noble
"You're Not The Kind"	1956	Gigi Gryce	"Pennies from Heaven"	1936	Arthur Johnston
"Zog's Jog"		James Morrison	"Cherokee"	1938	Ray Noble

== See also ==
- '50s progression
