= All God's Chillun Got Wings =

All God's Chillun Got Wings may refer to:

- "All God's Chillun Got Wings" (song), a spiritual song
- All God's Chillun Got Wings (play), a 1924 play by Eugene O'Neill

== See also ==
- All God's Children (disambiguation)
- "All God's Chillun Got Rhythm", a 1937 song by Bronisław Kaper, Gus Kahn, and Walter Jurmann
