= All God's Children =

All God's Children may refer to:

- All God's Children (1996 film), a 1996 American film
- All God's Children (2012 film), a 2012 Moldovan film
- "All God's Children" (song), a 1999 song by Belinda Carlisle
- All Gods Children (book), a 1977 book by Carroll Stoner and Jo Anne Parke
- "All God's Children", a story by Irma Berk and William Rowland adapted into the 1960 film This Rebel Breed
- All God's Children: The Bosket Family and the American Tradition of Violence, a 1995 book by Fox Butterfield

== See also ==
- All God's Children Need Traveling Shoes, a 1986 book by Maya Angelou
- "All God's Chillun Got Rhythm", a 1937 song by Bronisław Kaper, Gus Kahn, and Walter Jurmann
- All God's Chillun Got Wings (disambiguation)
- God's Children (disambiguation)
