= Goin' Home (Archie Shepp and Horace Parlan album) =

1977 studio album by Archie Shepp and Horace Parlan

Studio album by Archie Shepp and Horace Parlan
- Released: 1977
- Recorded: April 25, 1977
- Studio: Sweet Silence (Copenhagen)
- Genre: Jazz, gospel
- Length: 43:24
- Label: SteepleChase
- Producer: Nils Winther

Archie Shepp chronology
The Rising Sun Collection (1977)	Goin' Home (1977)	Ballads for Trane (1977)

Horace Parlan chronology
Frank-ly Speaking (1977)	Goin' Home (1977)	Hi-Fly (1978)

Goin' Home is a studio album by American saxophonist Archie Shepp and pianist Horace Parlan. After their work in the 1960s, Shepp and Parlan both faced career challenges as the jazz scene diverged stylistically. They left the United States for Europe during the 1970s and met each other in Denmark before recording the album on April 25, 1977, at Sweet Silence Studio in Copenhagen.

A jazz and gospel album, Goin' Home features Shepp and Parlan's interpretations of African-American folk melodies and spirituals. Its title is an allusion to Shepp's return to his African cultural roots. Shepp had never recorded spirituals before and was overcome with emotion during the album's recording because of the historical and cultural context of the songs.

Although it surprised jazz listeners upon its release in 1977, Goin' Home was praised by music critics for its reverent tone and stylistic deviation from Shepp's previous free jazz works. Shepp and Parlan were artistically satisfied with the album and subsequently recorded another album together, Trouble in Mind, in 1980. Goin' Home was reissued on CD by SteepleChase Records on May 3, 1994.

== Background ==
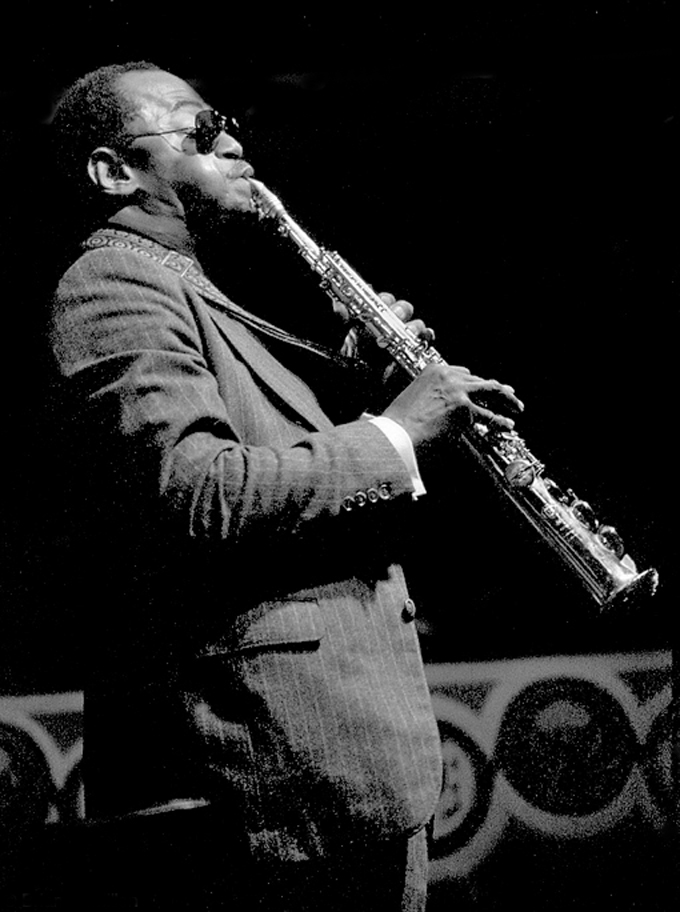
Shepp in 1982, playing the soprano saxophone

After rising to the top of the avant-garde jazz movement during the 1960s, Archie Shepp faced a career challenge during the 1970s after the style lost popularity in the jazz scene, which had split between artists who played either a tamer or a more experimental sound. Shepp became a more mainstream performer, mostly playing hard bop, although he would occasionally return to his free jazz sound. To support himself financially, he spent most of his time playing in Europe. In 1972, jazz pianist Horace Parlan left the United States and eventually settled in Denmark, where Shepp had signed to SteepleChase Records.

Shepp became interested in recording gospel and, at the request of his producer at SteepleChase, recorded Goin' Home with Parlan. They recorded the album on April 25, 1977, at Sweet Silence Studio in Copenhagen, Denmark. Shepp played tenor saxophone on six pieces and soprano saxophone on three others. Both Shepp and Parlan were artistically satisfied with Goin' Home and recorded another album together, the blues-inspired Trouble in Mind, in 1980.

== Composition and performance ==
According to music journalist Tom Moon, Goin' Home is a reverent jazz and gospel album played with straightforward simplicity by Shepp and Parlan. They interpret nine traditional Negro spirituals, featuring African-American folk melodies that originated from the 1920s and before. Along with Trouble in Mind and Looking at Bird in 1980, Goin' Home is part of a series of albums delineated in Shepp's discography as "modular explorations of traditional musical styles", which is itself in Shepp's broader series of musical "portraits of the Diaspora". The album's title alludes to a return to African cultural roots.

Shepp viewed Goin' Home as his attempt to cross the span of time and history between modern African Americans and the black slaves symbolized by the spirituals. In an interview for DownBeat, Shepp said that it was the first time he had recorded spirituals or made "any kind of serious statement about them", and said that he started to cry when he started playing on the album due to "the strain, the spiritual weight of the moment". He recalled being momentarily afraid that he would not be able to go through with the album's recording because of his emotional state, which he explained:

I felt I represented everybody who'd ever sang those songs, and to make the meaning of those songs clear was up to me at that point. They should be truthful, they should have the same authenticity as when they were sung, because that's the nature of this type of folk song. They were created by people who were in deep sorrow; they're slave songs. And so it challenged my own ability as modern Negro black man to traverse that historical plain. Could I do that? And I felt I could, and the tears were proof of it - that perhaps my condition hadn't changed so completely that I can't still feel what they felt.

"Swing Low, Sweet Chariot"
Shepp plays tenor saxophone on the song, accompanied by Parlan's bluesy, rhapsodic piano.

The album has a melodic form, and employs pentatonic scales for melodic development, a practice common in African and African-American folk music. Goin' Home is mostly tempoless, as most of the pieces are performed in a rubato-like free rhythm. Shepp and Parlan perform sudden accelerations and intended delays and halts, particularly at the end of bars, phrases, and sections in a piece. Most of the spirituals have a thirty-two-bar form, with the eight-bar section comprising four two-bar phrases wherein two choruses of the spiritual are played. Shepp and Parlan's interpretations include few choruses from the original spirituals.

Eschewing common jazz practice, Shepp does not improvise new melodic lines within the spirituals' harmonic framework, but plays short, impromptu passages around a melodic idea. Parlan plays piano solos on only two of the album's pieces. Shepp contributes a tonal roughness to the songs with growled sounds, which he plays by singing or humming into his saxophone. He also uses harmonic overtones, breathy tonal weight, and expressive chromatic development of melody to add textural and timbral variety to the songs. Shepp and Parlan's reverent takes on "Amazing Grace" and Go Down Moses" exhibit split tones and fortes.

== Release and reception ==
Retrospective professional reviews
Review scores
Source	Rating
AllMusic	4.5/5 stars
The Penguin Guide to Jazz	4/4 stars
The Rolling Stone Jazz Record Guide	5/5 stars
Tom Hull – on the Web	A
DownBeat	4/5 stars

Goin' Home was first released in 1977 by the Danish label SteepleChase Records. It was reissued on CD by SteepleChase on May 3, 1994.

Jazz listeners were divided in their reaction to the album. According to Doug Ramsey of Texas Monthly, some listeners were surprised by Shepp's stylistic change, while others viewed the record as a "fulfillment of promise". Ramsey believed it revealed a "tenderness and humor" from Shepp that his 1960s work only hinted at, writing that it "disclosed an Archie Shepp that many had never known, warm rather than blistering hot, witty rather than contemptuously sardonic". John Swenson, writing in The Rolling Stone Jazz Record Guide (1985), praised Shepp's work with Parlan and found Goin' Home "particularly heartfelt." Fernando Gonzalez of The Boston Globe called it "exquisite", and C. Gerald Fraser of The New York Times wrote in 1987 that "this marriage of avant-garde and soul" is "regarded as a classic". Art Lange of CODA magazine praised Shepp's "exquisite control" of his instrument, which he "quite literally" makes "able [to] talk", and found the spirituals to have been "sung" rather than just performed. Lange added that the emotional aspect is more impressive than the technical skill and stated:

The result is a truly spiritual music — one which is tender, passionate, muscular, uplifting, sensual, fiery, heartfelt, and heaven-storming all at once ... you can hear the same cry heard in Mahalia Jackson, in Billie Holiday, in Lester Young, in Ornette's piercing wail, in Ayler's wide-eyed scream, in Mingus, in Coltrane. It is not a cry of lament or a cry of weakness — it is a cry of strength, of affirmation, of soul.

In a retrospective review for AllMusic, jazz critic Scott Yanow found the performances "compelling" and said listeners who are "only familiar with Shepp's earlier Fire Music" will see the album as a "revelation." Moon believed its tempoless mood "gives the themes an extra shot of majesty" and found it "supremely melodic", writing that both Shepp and Parlan "do whatever is necessary to bring the spirit to the forefront." JazzTimes cited Goin' Home as one of "the finest [albums] of his career", and Tom Hull of The Village Voice cited it as SteepleChase's best release. Phil Johnson of The Independent wrote that the album "can be listened to almost without cease." Jazz historian Eric Nisenson called it "one of the most moving albums of the Seventies", but qualified his praise by critiquing that Shepp, an iconic figure in free jazz, "was no longer the firebrand who had so frightened and unsettled some white critics and jazz fans." Nisenson felt that, like Pharoah Sanders, Shepp's "trial by fire at the heart of the Sixties avant-garde had made him an unusually expressive musician," and Goin' Home showed that he was "finding inspiration in the entire black musical tradition."

== Track listing ==
All songs are traditional compositions, excepted where noted, and were arranged by Archie Shepp.

No.	Title	Length
1.	"Goin' Home"	6:11
2.	"Nobody Knows the Troubles I've Seen"	4:43
3.	"Go Down Moses"	4:21
4.	"Steal Away to Jesus"	6:14
5.	"Deep River"	4:51
6.	"My Lord What a Morning"	4:40
7.	"Amazing Grace" (composed by John Newton)	4:23
8.	"Sometimes I Feel Like a Motherless Child"	5:20
9.	"Swing Low, Sweet Chariot"	2:44

1994 CD bonus track
No.	Title	Length
10.	"Come Sunday" (composed by Duke Ellington)	7:46

== Personnel ==
Credits are adapted from the album's liner notes.

- Per Grunnet – design
- Freddy Hansson – engineer
- Horace Parlan – piano
- Flemming Rasmussen – assistant engineer
- Archie Shepp – arranger, soprano saxophone, tenor saxophone
- Gorm Valentin – photography
- Nils Winther – photographer, producer

== Bibliography ==
- Cook, Richard; Morton, Brian Morton (Scottish writer) (2002). The Penguin Guide to Jazz on CD (6th ed.). Penguin Books. ISBN 0140515216.
- Floyd, Samuel A. Jr. (June 27, 1995). The Power of Black Music: Interpreting Its History from Africa to the United States. Oxford University Press. ISBN 0198024371.
- Hoffmann, Bernd; Jost, Ekkehard (2002). "Goin' Home – On Archie Shepp's Sound Shaping". Jazzforschung (in German). Vol. 20601. Universal Edition. ISBN 9783201017954.
- Litweiler, John (1984). The Freedom Principle: Jazz After 1958. Da Capo Press. ISBN 0306803771.
- Moon, Tom (August 28, 2008). 1,000 Recordings to Hear Before You Die. Workman Publishing. p. 694. ISBN 978-0761153856.
- Nisenson, Eric (August 5, 2009). Ascension: John Coltrane and His Quest. Da Capo Press. ISBN 978-0786750955.
- Okpewho, Isidore; Boyce Davies, Carole; Mazrui, Ali Al'amin (2001). The African Diaspora: African Origins and New World Identities. Indiana University Press. ISBN 0253214947.
- Swenson, John (1985). The Rolling Stone Jazz Record Guide. Random House/Rolling Stone. ISBN 0-394-72643-X.
- Weinstein, Noman C. (1992). A Night in Tunisia: Imaginings of Africa in Jazz. Hal Leonard Corporation. ISBN 0879101679.
