= All God's Chillun Got Rhythm =

1937 song performed by Ivie Anderson

"All God's Chillun Got Rhythm" is a 1937 jazz standard. It was written by Walter Jurmann, Gus Kahn and Bronisław Kaper especially for Ivie Anderson, who performed it in the Marx Brothers' 1937 film A Day at the Races. The tune was also used for the opening theme.

The lyrics state that "All God's Children Got Rhythm" even if they "maybe haven't got money, maybe haven't got shoes". The authors (European immigrants from Poland, Germany, and Austria) were likely influenced by a traditional Negro spiritual "All God's Chillun Got Wings" (alternatively called "All God's Children Got Shoes"), which affirms that all God's children have shoes. This was the inspiration for a 1924 Eugene O'Neill play of the same name and was recorded by Paul Robeson, who also appeared in the play.

Miles Davis's composition "Little Willie Leaps" and "Reets and I" by Benny Harris, as well as some lesser-known compositions noted at List of jazz contrafacts, are based on the chord changes of the song.

== See also ==
- List of jazz standards
