= Looking at Bird =

Studio album by Archie Shepp & Niels-Henning Ørsted Pedersen
- Released: 1981
- Recorded: February 7, 1980
- Genre: Jazz
- Label: SteepleChase
- Producer: Nils Winther

Archie Shepp chronology
Trouble in Mind (1980)	Looking at Bird (1981)	Here Comes The Family (1980)

Niels-Henning Ørsted Pedersen chronology
Tivoli Gardens (1979)	Looking at Bird (1980)	Movability (1981)

Looking at Bird is a studio album by the American jazz saxophonist Archie Shepp and the bassist Niels-Henning Ørsted Pedersen, containing performances recorded in 1980 and released on the Danish-based SteepleChase label. The album consists of duets on compositions written by, or associated with, Charlie Parker.

== Reception ==
The AllMusic review by Scott Yanow stated: "Archie Shepp pays tribute to Bird not by copying him, but by being creative and playing Parker's repertoire in his own sound. Recommended."

Professional ratings
Review scores
Source	Rating
AllMusic	4/5 stars
The Penguin Guide to Jazz Recordings	3.5/4 stars
The Rolling Stone Jazz Record Guide	5/5 stars

== Track listing ==
All compositions by Charlie Parker except as indicated

1. "Moose the Mooche" - 6:26
2. "Embraceable You" (George Gershwin, Ira Gershwin) - 4:42
3. "Ornithology" (Benny Harris, Parker) - 5:45
4. "Billie's Bounce" - 5:24
5. "Yardbird Suite" - 4:38
6. "Blues for Alice" - 5:48
7. "How Deep Is the Ocean?" (Irving Berlin) - 5:54
8. "Confirmation" - 5:43

== Personnel ==
- Archie Shepp - soprano saxophone, tenor saxophone
- Niels-Henning Ørsted Pedersen - bass
