= Frankly Speaking =

Frankly Speaking may refer to:

- Frankly Speaking (album), a 1985 album by saxophonists Frank Foster and Frank Wess
- Frank-ly Speaking, a 1977 album by American jazz pianist Horace Parlan
- Frankly Speaking (TV series), a 2024 South Korean TV series
