= Cornelia Estelle Smith =

American entertainer and actor (1875–1970)

Cornelia Smith
- in 1955
- Born: Cornelia Estelle Johnson; 29 April 1875; South Carolina, United States
- Died: May 11, 1970 (aged 95); London, United Kingdom
- Occupation(s): Entertainer, Actress
- Spouse: Levi Augustus (Gus) Smith

Cornelia 'Connie' Estelle Smith (1875 – 1970) [née Johnson] was a music-hall entertainer and actress who was a member of the English Stage Company at the Royal Court Theatre. Appearing in theater and film, she was best known for her performances in All God’s Chillun Got Wings (1946), You Can't take it With You (1947), Kaiser Jones (1961), and as the sorceress Tituba in Arthur Miller's The Crucible.

== Early life and career ==
Smith was born on 29 April 1875 in South Carolina, U.S. She was the daughter of Matthew and Letta Johnson. At a young age, her family moved to Brooklyn, New York.

On July 4, 1894, she was one of a group of actors, musicians, and singers who left New York to tour Germany and Denmark in the stage production of The South before the War. During the tour, she met Levi Augustus Smith, a pianist and variety artist from Philadelphia, Pennsylvania. The two married in 1902 after moving to London in 1895.

In 1927, Smith and five other entertainers formed the Southern Serenaders, a group that recorded on the Parlophone label. In 1928, she was an understudy for Alberta Hunter in a production of Show Boat at the Drury Lane Theatre in London. Soon afterward, she became a member of the newly formed Dixie Harmony Quartet, which became the Dixie Trio when one member left in 1934.
