= No Blues =

No Blues may refer to:

- No Blues (Los Campesinos! album), 2013
- No Blues (Horace Parlan album), 1976
