= Trouble in Mind (Archie Shepp album) =

Studio album by Archie Shepp and Horace Parlan
- Released: 1980
- Recorded: February 6, 1980
- Studio: Sweet Silence Studios, Copenhagen
- Genre: Jazz
- Length: 50:13
- Label: SteepleChase
- Producer: Nils Winther

Archie Shepp chronology
Attica Blues Big Band (1979)	Trouble in Mind (1980)	Looking at Bird (1980)

Horace Parlan chronology
The Maestro (1979)	Trouble in Mind (1980)	Pannonica (1981)

Trouble in Mind is a studio album by American jazz saxophonist Archie Shepp and pianist Horace Parlan, featuring performances recorded in 1980 and released on the Danish-based SteepleChase label. The album consists mainly of early and traditional blues and follows up to their 1977 album of duets on spirituals Goin' Home.

== Reception ==
The AllMusic review by Scott Yanow stated: "It is particularly interesting to hear Shepp, best known for his ferocious free jazz performances of the mid-to-late '60s, adjusting his sound and giving such songs as "Trouble in Mind," Earl Hines's "Blues in Thirds" and "St. James Infirmary" tasteful and respectful yet emotional treatment. Recommended."

Professional ratings
Review scores
Source	Rating
AllMusic	4.5/5 stars
The Penguin Guide to Jazz Recordings	3/4 stars
The Rolling Stone Jazz Record Guide	4/5 stars

== Track listing ==
1. "Backwater Blues" (Bessie Smith) - 2:42
2. "Trouble in Mind" (Richard M. Jones) - 3:26
3. "Nobody Knows You When You're Down and Out" (Jimmy Cox) - 5:55
4. "Careless Love" (W. C. Handy) - 2:36
5. "How Long Blues" (Leroy Carr) - 5:00
6. "Blues in Thirds" (Earl Hines) - 5:16
7. "When Things Go Wrong" (Traditional) 5:05
8. "Goin' Down Slow" (St. Louis Jimmy Oden) - 4:26
9. "Court House Blues" (Traditional) - 3:41
10. "See See Rider" (Traditional) - 4:43
11. "Make Me a Pallet on the Floor (Traditional) - 3:26
12. "St. James Infirmary" (Traditional) - 4:22

== Personnel ==
- Archie Shepp - soprano saxophone, tenor saxophone
- Horace Parlan - piano
