= Children of God =

Children of God may refer to:

== Religion ==
- People of God, a Jewish and Christian term
- Divine filiation, the Christian concept of becoming a child of God
- The New Forest Shakers, also known as the Children of God, an English Christian new religious movement
- The Family International, formerly named the Children of God, an American Christian new religious movement

== Arts and entertainment ==
=== Music ===
- Children of God (Phil Wickham album), 2016
- Children of God (Swans album), 1987
- "Children of God", a song by Eyehategod from the 1992 album In the Name of Suffering
- "Children of God," a song by Third Day from the 2010 album Move
- "Children of God," a song by Andrew Jackson Jihad from the 2014 album Christmas Island

=== Other uses in arts and entertainment ===
- Children of God (2010 film), a Bahamian film
- Children of God (2026 film), an Indian film
- Children of God (novel), a 1998 novel by Mary Doria Russell

== Other uses ==
- Harijan, or "children of God", a Hindi term that Mahatma Gandhi used for Dalits

== See also ==
- God's Children (disambiguation)
- Child of God, a 1973 novel by Cormac McCarthy
