= Hi-Fly (Horace Parlan album) =

Studio album by Horace Parlan
- Released: 1978
- Recorded: February 15, 1978
- Genre: Jazz
- Length: 71:59
- Label: SteepleChase

Horace Parlan chronology
Goin' Home (1977)	Hi-Fly (1978)	Blue Parlan (1978)

Hi-Fly is a studio album by American jazz pianist Horace Parlan, featuring performances recorded in 1978 and released on the Danish-based SteepleChase label. The album was produced using direct to disc recording and the CD reissue included alternate takes of all six tracks.

== Reception ==
AllMusic writer Ken Dryden gave the album 4 out of 5 stars and stated: "The ease with which Parlan and Raney handle 'Hi-Fly' over Little's walking bass is the mark of masters."

Professional ratings
Review scores
Source	Rating
AllMusic	4/5 stars

== Track listing ==
1. "Hi-Fly" (Randy Weston) – 6:58
2. "'Round About Midnight" (Thelonious Monk) – 7:29
3. "Once I Loved" (Vinícius de Moraes, Ray Gilbert, Antônio Carlos Jobim) – 4:45
4. "Darn That Dream" (Eddie DeLange, Jimmy Van Heusen) – 7:02
5. "Who Cares?" (George Gershwin, Ira Gershwin) – 5:33
6. "West Coast Blues" (Wes Montgomery) – 4:44
7. "Hi-Fly" [alternate take] (Weston) – 6:36 Bonus track on CD reissue
8. "'Round About Midnight" [alternate take] (Monk) – 7:27 Bonus track on CD reissue
9. "Once I Loved" [alternate take] (DeMoraes, Gilbert, Jobim) – 4:49 Bonus track on CD reissue
10. "Darn That Dream" [alternate take] (DeLange, Van Heusen) – 6:53 Bonus track on CD reissue
11. "Who Cares?" [alternate take] (Gershwin, Gershwin) – 5:15 Bonus track on CD reissue
12. "West Coast Blues" [alternate take] (Montgomery) – 4:28 Bonus track on CD reissue

== Personnel ==
- Horace Parlan – piano
- Doug Raney – guitar
- Wilbur Little – bass
