= Horace Parlan =

American jazz pianist and composer (1931–2017)

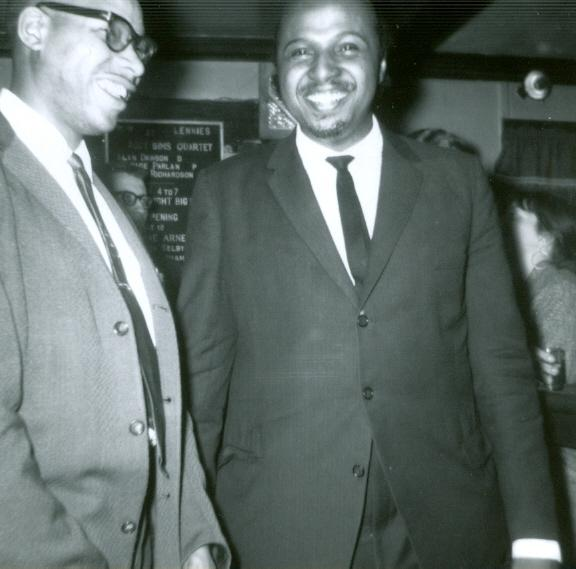
- Parlan (right) with Alan Dawson at Lennie's on the Turnpike, Peabody, Massachusetts

Background information
- Born: January 19, 1931; Pittsburgh, Pennsylvania, U.S.
- Died: February 23, 2017 (aged 86) Næstved, Zealand, Denmark
- Genres: Bebop; avant-garde jazz; post-bop; third stream
- Occupations: Musician, composer
- Instrument: Piano
- Labels: Blue Note, SteepleChase

Horace Parlan (January 19, 1931 – February 23, 2017) was an American jazz pianist and composer known for working in the hard bop and post-bop styles. In addition to his work as a bandleader, Parlan was known for his contributions to the Charles Mingus recordings Mingus Ah Um (1959) and Blues & Roots (1960).

== Early life ==
Horace Parlan was born in Pittsburgh, Pennsylvania, United States. In his birth year, Parlan was stricken with polio, resulting in the partial crippling of his right hand. This handicap contributed to his development of a particularly "pungent" left-hand chord voicing style, while comping with highly rhythmic phrases with the right.

== Later life and career ==
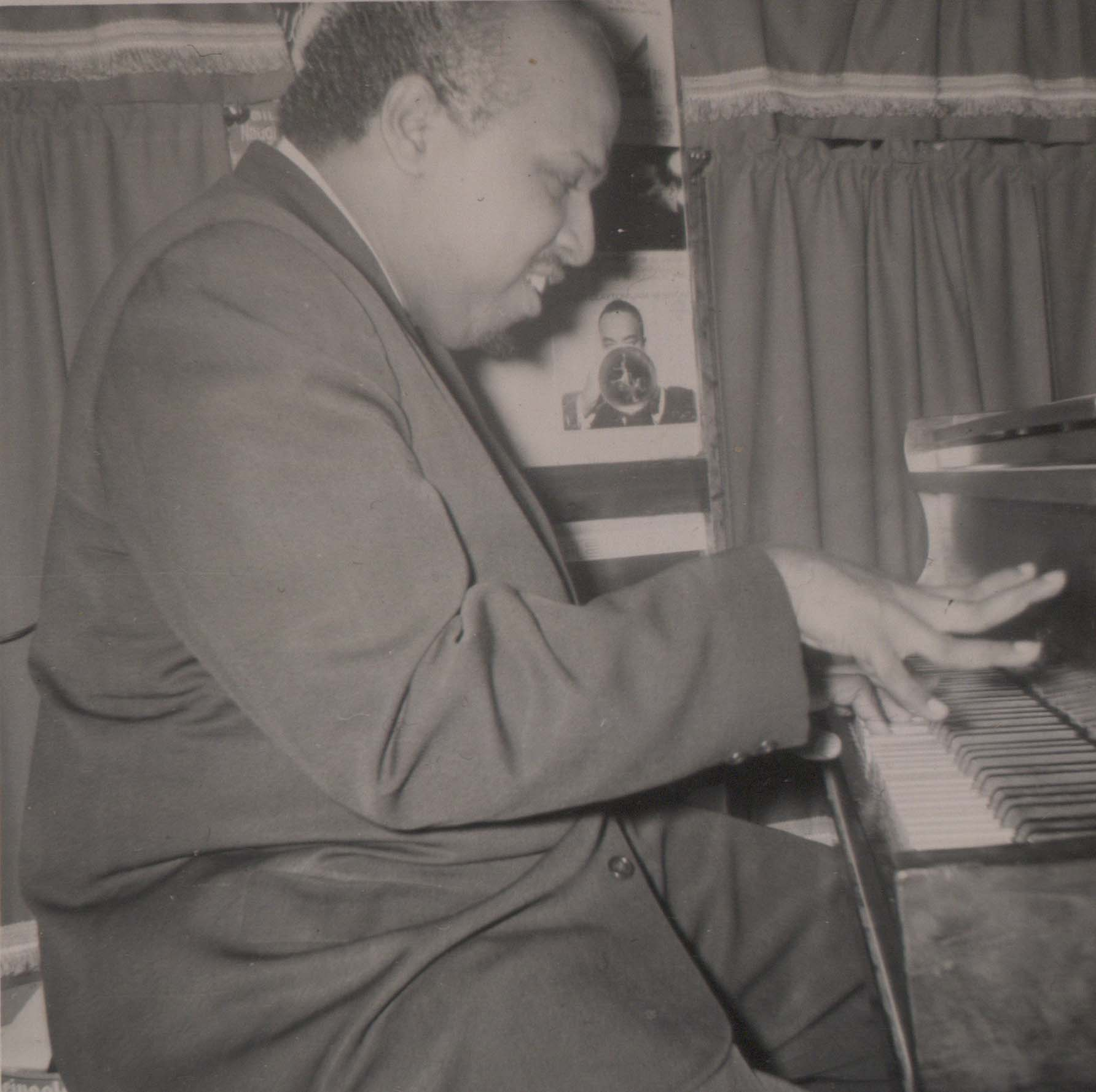
Parlan at Lennie's on the Turnpike, Peabody, Massachusetts, 1964

Between 1952 and 1957, he worked in Washington, D.C., with Sonny Stitt, then spent two years with Mingus's Jazz Workshop ensemble. In 1973, Parlan moved to Copenhagen, Denmark. He later settled in the small village of Rude in southern Zealand. In 1974, he completed a State Department tour of Africa with Hal Singer.

His later work, such as a series of duos with the tenor saxophonist Archie Shepp, included the album Goin' Home (1977), steeped in gospel music.

Parlan received the Ben Webster Prize in 2000, awarded by the Ben Webster Foundation.

He died at a nursing home in Næstved, Denmark, at the age of 86. (Note: The New York Times obituary notes Parlan's place of death as Korsør, Denmark. Both Korsør and Næstved are located in Zealand, Denmark.) He had been suffering from multiple ailments, including diabetes and failing eyesight.

== Discography ==
=== As leader/co-leader ===
Recording date	Title	Label	Release year	Notes
1960-02	Movin' & Groovin'	Blue Note	1960	Trio, with Sam Jones (bass), Al Harewood (drums)
1960-04	Us Three	Blue Note	1960	Trio, with George Tucker (bass), Al Harewood (drums)
1960-07	Speakin' My Piece	Blue Note	1960	Quintet, with Tommy Turrentine (trumpet), Stanley Turrentine (tenor sax), George Tucker (bass), Al Harewood (drums)
1960-12	Headin' South	Blue Note	1961	Some tracks trio, with George Tucker (bass), Al Harewood (drums); most tracks quartet, with Ray Barretto (congas) added
1961-03	On the Spur of the Moment	Blue Note	1961	Quintet, with Tommy Turrentine (trumpet), Stanley Turrentine (tenor sax), George Tucker (bass), Al Harewood (drums)
1961-06	Up & Down	Blue Note	1963	Quintet, with Booker Ervin (tenor sax), Grant Green (guitar), George Tucker (bass), Al Harewood (drums)
1963-02	Happy Frame of Mind	Blue Note	1986	One track quintet, with Johnny Coles (trumpet), Booker Ervin (tenor sax), Butch Warren (bass), Billy Higgins (drums); other tracks sextet, with Grant Green (guitar) added; originally released as part of Booker Ervin's Back from the Gig; released in Parlan's name in 1986
1973-12	Arrival	SteepleChase	1974	Some tracks trio, with Hugo Rasmussen (bass), Ed Thigpen (drums); some tracks quintet, with Idrees Sulieman (flugelhorn), Bent Jædig (tenor sax) added
1975-12	No Blues	Steeplechase	1976	Trio, with Niels-Henning Ørsted Pedersen (bass), Tony Inzalaco (drums)
1977-02	Frank-ly Speaking	Steeplechase	1977	Quintet, with Frank Foster (tenor sax), Frank Strozier (alto sax), Lisle Atkinson (bass) Al Harewood (drums)
1977-04	Goin' Home	Steeplechase	1977	Duo, co-led with Archie Shepp (tenor sax, soprano sax)
1978-02	Hi-Fly	Steeplechase	1978	Trio, with Doug Raney (guitar), Wilbur Little (bass)
1978-11	Blue Parlan	Steeplechase	1979	Trio, with Wilbur Little (bass), Dannie Richmond (drums)
1979-11	Musically Yours	Steeplechase	1980	Solo piano
1979-11	The Maestro	Steeplechase	1982	Solo piano
1980-02	Trouble in Mind	Steeplechase	1980	Duo, co-led with Archie Shepp (tenor sax, soprano sax)
1981-02	Pannonica	Enja	1984	Trio, with Reggie Johnson (bass), Alvin Queen (drums)
1983-03	Like Someone in Love	Steeplechase	1983	Trio, with Jesper Lundgaard (bass), Dannie Richmond (drums)
1983-06	Jazzbühne Berlin '83 / Jazzbühne Berlin '79	Repertoire	1991	[2in1 CD] album shared with Mal Waldron; Solo piano
1984-07	Glad I Found You	Steeplechase	1984	Quintet, with Thad Jones (flugelhorn), Eddie Harris (tenor sax), Jesper Lundgaard (bass), Aage Tanggaard (drums)
1987-03	Little Esther	Soul Note	1987	Quartet, with Per Goldschmidt (baritone saxophone), Klavs Hovman (bass), Massimo De Majo (drums)
1987-05	Duo Reunion	L+R	1987	Duo, co-led with Archie Shepp (tenor saxophone)
1988-01	Keep Your Hands Wide Open	Olufsen	1988	Most tracks duo, with Soren S. Eriksen (alto saxophone); one track trio, with Thomas Helmig (vocals) added
1991-09	Swing Low	Plainisphare	1993	Duo, co-led with Archie Shepp (tenor sax, alto saxophone, vocals); in concert
1994-04	Joinin' Forces	Olufsen	1994	Duo, co-led with Jan Kaspersen (piano)
1997-06	We Three	Baybridge	1998	Trio, with Mads Vinding (bass), Ed Thigpen (drums)
1998-08	The Horace Parlan Trio also released as Kōjō no Tsuki (荒城の月)	M&I	1999	Trio, with Jesper Lundgaard (bass), Ed Thigpen (drums)
1999-01	Voyage of Rediscovery	Storyville	1999	Solo piano
2001-09	Behind the Blues	Leafage Jazz	2002	Some tracks trio, with Mads Vinding (bass), Ed Thigpen (drums); some tracks quartet, with Staffan William-Olsson (guitar) added
2003-12	Relaxin' with Horace	Stunt	2004	Trio, with Jesper Lundgaard (bass), Ed Thigpen (drums)
2007-03	My Little Brown Book	Stunt	2007	Trio, with Christina Von Bulow (alto sax), Jesper Lundgaard (bass)

Main source:

=== As sideman ===
With Dave Bailey

- One Foot in the Gutter (Epic, 1960)
- Gettin' Into Somethin' (Epic, 1961) – rec. 1960

With Eddie "Lockjaw" Davis

- Goin' to the Meeting (Prestige, 1961) – rec. 1960
- Tough Tenor Favorites (Jazzland, 1962) also with Johnny Griffin
- Jaw's Blues (Enja, 1981)

With Lou Donaldson

- The Time Is Right (Blue Note, 1959)
- Sunny Side Up (Blue Note, 1960)
- Midnight Sun (Blue Note, 1980) – rec. 1960

With Booker Ervin

- That's It! (Candid, 1961)
- Exultation! (Prestige, 1963)

With Dexter Gordon

- Doin' Allright (Blue Note, 1961)
- Stable Mable (SteepleChase, 1975)

With Slide Hampton

- Jazz with a Twist (Atlantic, 1962) – rec. 1961
- Explosion! The Sound of Slide Hampton (Atlantic, 1962)

With Roland Kirk

- Gifts & Messages (Mercury, 1964)
- I Talk with the Spirits (Limelight, 1965) – rec. 1964
- Slightly Latin (Limelight, 1965)

With Charles Mingus

- A Modern Jazz Symposium of Music and Poetry (Bethlehem, 1957)
- Mingus Ah Um (Columbia, 1959)
- Blues & Roots (Atlantic, 1960) – rec. 1959

With Doug Raney

- I'll Close My Eyes (SteepleChase, 1982)
- Meeting the Tenors (Criss Cross, 1983) – rec. 1984

With Archie Shepp

- Splashes (L+R, 1987)
- Black Ballads (Timeless, 1992)

With Idrees Sulieman

- Bird's Grass (SteepleChase, 1985) – rec. 1976
- Groovin' (SteepleChase, 1986) – rec. 1985

With Stanley Turrentine

- Look Out! (Blue Note, 1960)
- Up at "Minton's" (Blue Note, 1961)
- Salt Song (CTI, 1971)
- Comin' Your Way (Blue Note, 1987) – rec. 1961

With others

- Gene Ammons, Gene Ammons in Sweden (Enja, 1981) – rec. 1973
- Al Cohn and Zoot Sims, Motoring Along (Sonet, 1975)
- Johnny Coles, New Morning (Criss Cross Jazz, 1982)
- Pierre Dorge, The Jazzpar Prize (Enja, 1992)
- Frank Foster, The House That Love Built (SteepleChase, 1982)
- Hugo Heredia, Mananita Pampera (Cote d'azur, 1976)
- Langston Hughes, Weary Blues (MGM, 1958)
- Tommy Turrentine, Tommy Turrentine (Time, 1960)
- Kai Winding and Curtis Fuller, Giant Bones '80 (Sonet, 1980)
- various artists, A Moon of Roses

== Film ==
- Horace Parlan by Horace Parlan [DVD] – documentary
