= Musically Yours =

Studio album by Horace Parlan
- Released: 1980
- Recorded: November 26, 1979
- Studio: Sweet Silence Studios, Copenhagen
- Genre: Jazz
- Length: 48:38
- Label: SteepleChase
- Producer: Nils Winther

Horace Parlan chronology
| Blue Parlan (1978) | Musically Yours (1980) | The Maestro (1979) |

Musically Yours is a solo album by American jazz pianist Horace Parlan featuring performances recorded in 1979 and released on the Danish-based SteepleChase label. The album consists mainly of jazz standards and show tunes with one original by Parlan. The same sessions also produced Parlan's album The Maestro.

== Reception ==
The Allmusic review by Scott Yanow awarded the album 3 stars stating "Parlan tends to sound at his best in a trio where he can draw inspiration from his sidemen, so this often-sparse set of unaccompanied piano solos, despite some good moments, is not his most essential outing".

Professional ratings
Review scores
| Source | Rating |
|---|---|
| Allmusic | 3/5 stars |
| The Penguin Guide to Jazz Recordings | 3/4 stars |

== Track listing ==
1. "Alone Together" (Howard Dietz, Arthur Schwartz) - 6:14
2. "Memories of You" (Eubie Blake, Andy Razaf) - 6:16
3. "Musically Yours" (Horace Parlan) - 5:37
4. "Ill Wind" (Harold Arlen, Ted Koehler) - 7:03
5. "Lullaby of the Leaves" (Bernice Petkere, Joe Young) - 5:25
6. "Ruby, My Dear" (Thelonious Monk) - 5:47
7. "Jitterbug Waltz" (Fats Waller) - 6:27
8. "Nardis" (Miles Davis) - 5:49

== Personnel ==
- Horace Parlan - piano
