= Wilbur Little =

American jazz bassist

- Born: March 5, 1928; Parmele, North Carolina, U.S.
- Died: May 4, 1987 (aged 59) Amsterdam, Netherlands
- Genre: Jazz
- Occupation: Musician
- Instruments: Double bass, piano
- Formerly of: Tommy Flanagan, "Sir" Charles Thompson, J. J. Johnson, Archie Shepp

Wilbur "Doc" Little (March 5, 1928 – May 4, 1987) was an American jazz bassist known for playing hard bop and post-bop.

Little originally played piano, but switched to double bass after serving in the military. In 1949 he moved to Washington, D.C., where he worked with "Sir" Charles Thompson, among others. After that, he was in J. J. Johnson's quintet from 1955 to 1958. He was the bassist on pianist Tommy Flanagan's first studio album, recorded when he and Flanagan were touring in Europe as members of Johnson's band.

Little moved to the Netherlands in 1977 and lived there for the rest of his life.

== Discography ==
=== As sideman ===
With Tommy Flanagan

- Overseas (Prestige, 1957)

With Buck Hill

- Easy to Love (SteepleChase, 1981 [1982])
- Impressions (SteepleChase, 1981 [1983])

With Freddie Hubbard

- Jam Gems: Live at the Left Bank (Label M, 1965)

With Elvin Jones

- Live at the Village Vanguard (Enja, 1968)
- Poly-Currents (Blue Note, 1969)
- The Prime Element (Blue Note, 1969)
- Coalition (Blue Note, 1970)

With J. J. Johnson

- J Is for Jazz (Columbia, 1956)
- Dial J. J. 5 (Columbia, 1957)
- J. J. in Person! (Columbia, 1958)

With Duke Jordan

- Live in Japan (SteepleChase, 1976 [1977])
- Flight to Japan (SteepleChase, 1976 [1978])
- Tivoli One (SteepleChase, 1978, [1984])
- Tivoli Two (SteepleChase, 1978, [1984])
- Wait and See (SteepleChase, 1978 [1994])

With Lee Konitz

- Oleo (Sonet, 1975)

With Junior Mance

- Live at the Top (Atlantic, 1968)

With Horace Parlan

- Blue Parlan (Steeplechase, 1978)
- Hi-Fly (Steeplechase, 1978)

With Roswell Rudd

- Blown Bone (Philips, 1979)

With Archie Shepp

- Little Red Moon (Soul Note, 1985)

With Randy Weston

- Live at the Five Spot (United Artists, 1959)
