= Blue Parlan =

Studio album by Horace Parlan
- Released: 1979
- Recorded: November 13, 1978
- Genre: Jazz
- Length: 46:46
- Label: SteepleChase

Horace Parlan chronology
Hi-Fly (1978)	Blue Parlan (1979)	Musically Yours (1979)

Blue Parlan is an album by American jazz pianist Horace Parlan featuring performances recorded in 1978 and released on the Danish-based SteepleChase label.

== Reception ==
Professional ratings
Review scores
Source	Rating
AllMusic	4/5 stars
The Penguin Guide to Jazz Recordings	4/4 stars

Ron Wynn for AllMusic states "Parlan gets down in this striking trio outing".

== Track listing ==
1. "Goodbye Pork Pie Hat" (Charles Mingus) – 8:05
2. "Sunspots" (Austin Wells) – 6:13
3. "Firm Roots" (Cedar Walton) – 4:32
4. "Monk's Mood" (Thelonious Monk) – 5:53
5. "Neicy" (Frank Strozier) – 5:49
6. "Night Mist Blues" (Ahmad Jamal) – 4:43
7. "Cynthia's Dance" (Horace Parlan) – 6:06
8. "There's No Greater Love" (Isham Jones, Marty Symes) – 4:34

== Personnel ==
- Horace Parlan – piano
- Wilbur Little – bass
- Dannie Richmond – drums
