= God's Child =

God's Child may refer to:

- Gods Child, an American rock band
- "God's Child (Baila Conmigo)", a song by Selena from the 1995 album Dreaming of You

== See also ==
- God's Children (disambiguation)
- Child of God, a 1973 novel by Cormac McCarthy
