= Autumn Leaves =

Autumn Leaves may refer to:

- Autumn leaf color, a phenomenon affecting deciduous plants by autumn
- Autumn Leaves (film), a 1956 film directed by Robert Aldrich
- Autumn Leaves (painting), an 1856 painting by John Everett Millais
- Aŭtunaj folioj (English: Autumn leaves), a posthumous poetry collection by Julio Baghy
- Autumn Leaves (magazine), a former children's magazine of the Reorganized Church of Jesus Christ of Latter Day Saints

== Music ==
- "Autumn Leaves" (1945 song), a jazz standard written by Joseph Kosma. Recordings feature on:
  - Autumn Leaves (Cannonball Adderley album), 1963
  - Autumn Leaves (Bill Evans album), 1980
  - Autumn Leaves, an album by Don Byas
  - Autumn Leaves (Nat Adderley album)
- "Autumn Leaves" (Daniel Kajmakoski song), North Macedonia's 2015 Eurovision entry
- "Autumn Leaves", a song by Ved Buens Ende from Written in Waters
- "Autumn Leaves", a song by Ed Sheeran from +
- "Autumn Leaves" (Chris Brown song), a song by Chris Brown from X
- "The Autumn Leaves", a song by ATB from No Silence

== Television ==
- "Autumn Leaves", an episode of the TV series Handy Manny
- "Autumn Leaves", an episode of the TV series Rugrats
- "Autumn Leaves", an episode of the TV series The Wombles
