= God's Children =

God's Children may refer to:

- "God's Children" (The Kinks song), 1971
- "God's Children" (The Gutter Twins song), 2008

== See also ==
- God's Child (disambiguation)
- Children of God (disambiguation)
- All God's Children (disambiguation)
