= The Maestro (Horace Parlan album) =

Studio album by Horace Parlan
- Released: 1982
- Recorded: November 26, 1979
- Genre: Jazz
- Length: 49:50
- Label: SteepleChase

Horace Parlan chronology
| Musically Yours (1979) | The Maestro (1982) | Trouble in Mind (1980) |

The Maestro is a solo album by American jazz pianist Horace Parlan featuring performances recorded in 1979 and released on the Danish-based SteepleChase label in 1982. The album consists mainly of jazz standards and show tunes. The same sessions also produced Parlan's album Musically Yours.

== Reception ==
The Allmusic review by Ron Wynn awarded the album 2½ stars stating "Listen to moving and definitive solo piano".

Professional ratings
Review scores
| Source | Rating |
|---|---|
| Allmusic | 2.5/5 stars |
| The Penguin Guide to Jazz Recordings | 3/4 stars |

== Track listing ==
1. "Ruby, My Dear" (Thelonious Monk) – 5:38
2. "Spring Is Here" (Lorenz Hart, Richard Rodgers) – 6:29
3. "A Flower Is a Lovesome Thing" (Billy Strayhorn) – 6:01
4. "Peace" (Horace Silver) – 5:13
5. "The Maestro" (Cedar Walton) – 8:15
6. "Nardis" (Miles Davis) – 5:12
7. "Alone Together" (Howard Dietz, Arthur Schwartz) – 6:19
8. "Ill Wind" (Harold Arlen, Ted Koehler) – 6:43

== Personnel ==
- Horace Parlan – piano
