= Voyage of Rediscovery =

Studio album by Horace Parlan
- Released: 1999
- Recorded: January 14–15, 1999
- Studio: Focus Studio, Copenhagen, Denmark
- Genre: Jazz
- Length: 75:21
- Label: Storyville; STCD 4233
- Producer: Anders Stefansen

Horace Parlan chronology
The Horace Parlan Trio (1998)	Voyage of Rediscovery (1999)	Behind the Blues (2001)

Voyage of Rediscovery is a solo album by pianist Horace Parlan which was recorded in Denmark in 1999 and released on the Danish Storyville label.

== Reception ==
Professional ratings
Review scores
Source	Rating
AllMusic	4.5/5 stars
The Penguin Guide to Jazz Recordings	3/4 stars

The AllMusic review by Ken Dryden said "Voyage of Discovery is a rare opportunity to hear Horace Parlan playing solo piano, recorded over two sessions in early 1999. Parlan has plenty of surprises in store".

== Track listing ==
1. "Parker's Mood" (Charlie Parker) – 5:31
2. "Broken Promises" (Horace Parlan) – 4:35
3. "Two Sleepy People" (Hoagy Carmichael, Frank Loesser) – 7:01
4. "I'm Getting Sentimental Over You" (George Bassman, Ned Washington) – 5:15
5. "Déjà Vu" (Archie Shepp) – 5:29
6. "Time for Love" (Johnny Mandel, Paul Francis Webster) – 6:57
7. "Three Little Words" (Harry Ruby, Bert Kalmar) – 4:20
8. "Blood Count" (Billy Strayhorn) – 7:32
9. "I Waited for You" (Dizzy Gillespie) – 6:40
10. "Make Me a Pallet on the Floor" (Traditional) – 5:10
11. "Pannonica" (Thelonious Monk) – 6:29
12. "Melancholia" (Duke Ellington) – 6:21

== Personnel ==
- Horace Parlan – piano
