= Movin' & Groovin' =

Studio album by Horace Parlan
- Released: 1960
- Recorded: February 29, 1960
- Studio: Van Gelder Studio; Englewood Cliffs, New Jersey
- Genre: Jazz
- Length: 43:05
- Label: Blue Note; BLP 4028
- Producer: Alfred Lion

Horace Parlan chronology
Movin' & Groovin' (1960)	Us Three (1960)

Movin' & Groovin' is the debut album by American jazz pianist Horace Parlan recorded on February 29, 1960 and released on the Blue Note later that year.

== Reception ==
The AllMusic review by Stephen Thomas Erlewine states, "Movin' and Groovin' is a thoroughly impressive affair, establishing Parlan as a distinctive hard bop stylist... Everything swings, no matter the tempo, and the end result is a fine debut from a distinctive pianist."

Professional ratings
Review scores
Source	Rating
AllMusic	4/5 stars

== Track listing ==
=== Side 1 ===
1. "C Jam Blues" (Barney Bigard, Duke Ellington) – 5:13
2. "On Green Dolphin Street" – (Bronislau Kaper, Ned Washington) – 5:30
3. "Up in Cynthia's Room" (Horace Parlan) – 5:26
4. "Lady Bird" (Tadd Dameron) – 5:03

=== Side 2 ===
1. "Bags' Groove" (Milt Jackson) – 5:48
2. "Stella by Starlight" (Ned Washington, Victor Young) – 6:04
3. "There Is No Greater Love" (Isham Jones, Marty Symes) – 6:43
4. "It Could Happen to You" (Johnny Burke, Jimmy Van Heusen) – 3:18

== Personnel ==
=== Musicians ===
- Horace Parlan – piano
- Sam Jones – bass
- Al Harewood – drums

=== Technical personnel ===
- Alfred Lion – producer
- Rudy Van Gelder – recording engineer, mastering
- Reid Miles – design
- Francis Wolff – photography
- Leonard Feather – liner notes
