= Eric Nisenson =

American writer and jazz historian (1946–2003)

- Born: February 12, 1946; New York City, U.S.
- Died: August 15, 2003 (aged 57); Malden, Massachusetts, U.S.
- Education: New York University
- Occupations: Author and jazz historian

Eric Nisenson (February 12, 1946 – August 15, 2003) was an American author and jazz historian.

== Biography ==
The son of inventor Jules Nisenson, Nisenson was born on February 12, 1946, in New York City and was raised in Rye, New York. He attended New York University (NYU), where he studied English, and then moved to San Francisco, where he worked on the staffs of alternative publications including The Berkeley Barb and Heliotrope.

Nisenson became a lifelong lover of jazz at the age of 15, when he listened to trumpeter Miles Davis's 1959 album Kind of Blue. In the early 1970s, after he had moved back to New York, Nisenson was introduced to Davis. Although, as Nisenson recounts, he was "terrified" of Davis the first time he met him, the two men became friends, and Davis asked Nisenson to write his official biography. By the time Round About Midnight: A Portrait of Miles Davis was published in 1982, however, the friendship had ended (Davis was not easy to get along with, though Nisenson wrote in a second revision of the biography, that Miles had deserted him as Cicely Tyson was determined for Miles to start a new lifestyle and cut his ties with the past).

In 1993, Nisenson published a biography of saxophonist John Coltrane entitled Ascension: John Coltrane and his Quest, but by that time he had been diagnosed with a form of leukemia and was struggling with the disease and complications arising from it. The illness largely kept Nisenson confined to his house, but as he fought it he focused increasingly on his work. In 1997, he published Blue: The Murder of Jazz, a critical work arguing that conservative musicians and record labels are stifling the innovation that makes jazz distinctive. The year 2000 saw two new works from Nisenson, The Making of Kind of Blue, which focuses on the inspiration behind the landmark album; and a biography of saxophonist Sonny Rollins called Open Sky: Sonny Rollins and His World of Improvisation.

Nisenson died in Malden, Massachusetts, on August 15, 2003, of kidney failurerelated to his leukemia. At the time of his death, he was working on a biography of pianist Dave Brubeck and a study of Brazilian music and culture.

== Published works ==
- Round About Midnight: A Portrait of Miles Davis
- Ascension: John Coltrane and his Quest
- Blue: The Murder of Jazz
- The Making of Kind of Blue
- Open Sky: Sonny Rollins and His World of Improvisation
