= No Blues (Horace Parlan album) =

Studio album by Horace Parlan
- Released: 1976
- Recorded: December 10, 1975
- Genre: Jazz
- Label: SteepleChase

Horace Parlan chronology
| Arrival (1973) | No Blues (1976) | Frank-ly Speaking (1974) |

No Blues is an album by American jazz pianist Horace Parlan featuring performances recorded in 1975 and released on the Danish-based SteepleChase label.

== Reception ==
The AllMusic review awarded the album 4 stars.

Professional ratings
Review scores
| Source | Rating |
|---|---|
| AllMusic | 4/5 stars |
| The Penguin Guide to Jazz Recordings | 3/4 stars |

== Track listing ==
1. "No Blues" (Miles Davis) – 6:13
2. "My Foolish Heart" (Ned Washington, Victor Young) – 4:57
3. "Have You Met Miss Jones?" (Lorenz Hart, Richard Rodgers) – 5:07
4. "A Theme for Ahmad" (Horace Parlan) – 5:30
5. "Hi-Fly" (Randy Weston) – 8:03
6. "West of Eden" (Austin Wells) – 6:12
7. "Holy Land" (Cedar Walton) – 6:42
8. "Darn That Dream" (Eddie DeLange, Jimmy Van Heusen) – 4:43

== Personnel ==
- Horace Parlan – piano
- Niels-Henning Ørsted Pedersen – bass
- Tony Inzalaco – drums
