= Ornithology (composition) =

1946 jazz standard by Charlie Parker and Benny Harris

Single by The Charlie Parker Septet
- B-side: "A Night in Tunisia"
- Recorded: March 28, 1946, Radio Recorders Studios, Hollywood
- Genre: Bebop
- Length: 3:03
- Label: Dial; 1002
- Songwriter(s): Charlie Parker; Benny Harris

"Ornithology" is a jazz standard by bebop alto saxophonist Charlie Parker and trumpeter Benny Harris.

== Description ==
Its title is a reference to Parker's nickname, "Bird" (ornithology is the study of birds). The Charlie Parker Septet made the first recording of the tune on March 28, 1946 on the Dial label, and it was inducted into the Grammy Hall of Fame in 1989.

"Ornithology" is a contrafact – a newly created melody written over the chord progression of another song, in this case the standard "How High the Moon". It remains one of the most popular and frequently performed bebop tunes. Jazz vocalists scatting on "How High the Moon" (notably Ella Fitzgerald) often quote the melody of "Ornithology" (and vice versa). Coleman Hawkins used the first two bars of the melody in a Cozy Cole recording session dating back to November 14, 1944, in a tune called "Look Here".

Notable recordings include Bud Powell's version and the Gerry Mulligan-Chet Baker 1957 version. Babs Gonzales wrote vocalese lyrics for the tune.

"Ornithology" was prominently featured in the novel Suder by Percival Everett.

The name was also used by a jazz club in Brooklyn, Ornithology Jazz Club.

== See also ==
- List of jazz contrafacts
