= All Gods Children (book) =

1977 nonfiction book by Carroll Stoner and Jo Anne Parke

- First edition
- Author: Carroll Stoner, Jo Anne Parke
- Language: English
- Subject: Cults
- Genre: Non-fiction
- Publisher: Chilton Book Co
- Publication date: May 1977
- Publication place: United States
- Pages: 324
- ISBN: 0-8019-6620-5

All Gods Children: The Cult Experience – Salvation Or Slavery? is a non-fiction book on cults, by journalists Carroll Stoner and Jo Anne Parke. The book was published in May 1977 in hardcover, and again in 1979 in paperback by Penguin Books.

== Reception ==
White's Collection Management in School Library Media Centers described the book as a critical and sensitive analysis on the effects cults can have on their converts and family members. Bob Larson's Larson's Book of World Religions and Alternative Spirituality states that the work describes some of the newer cults, explains their teachings, and why they may be dangerous for younger new members. McConnell's Stepping Over described the work as an insightful seminal study, which could have been written specifically with regard to Jim Jones and the Peoples Temple.

J. Milton Yinger, writing for Contemporary Sociology, notes that Stoner and Parke seem inconsistent about some of their book's details, like the range of people who enter cults. Saul V. Levine, writing for the American Journal of Orthopsychiatry, calls the book "fair" in its treatment of everyone involved including new religious movement (NRM) leaders, deprogrammers, and NRM members and their relatives. W. L. Hendricks for the Journal of Church and State thinks that the book "suffers from the 'cover-all' mystique" and attempts to give a survey of too many groups to be effective. Hendricks also believes that it tends toward sociological and psychological perspectives rather than theological perspectives, and its particular strength is in its anecdotal perspectives of NRM members.

Sociologist Thomas Robbins is much more critical in Sociological Analysis. He believes the book is "entirely preoccupied" with the dangers of cults that "break up families" and use brainwashing techniques and with what American society can and should do to "rescue and rehabilitate the alleged cultic zombie". He thinks that the questions that Stoner and Parke ask limit their scholarly objectivity – "when one's inquiry is framed in terms of questions such as 'why these young people are so easily deceived'", it limits what conclusions can be made, according to Robbins. Robbins also believes that Stoner and Parke somewhat disregard civil liberties when discussing deprogramming and the First Amendment.
