= Dizzy Atmosphere =

1945 song by Dizzy Gillespie

Dizzy Atmosphere is a jazz standard by Dizzy Gillespie originally recorded in 1945 with Charlie Parker.

Harmonically, it is based on the chord progression found in George Gershwin's I Got Rhythm, or "rhythm changes" as referred to in jazz.
