= J. J. Johnson's Jazz Quintets =

Studio album by J. J. Johnson
- Released: 1950s
- Recorded: June 26, 1946, December 24, 1947, May 11, 1949
- Genre: Jazz
- Length: 32:44
- Label: Savoy

J. J. Johnson chronology
J. J. Johnson's Jazz Quintets (1950)	Jay Jay Johnson Sextet (Prestige EP) (1949)

Professional ratings
Review scores
Source	Rating
AllMusic	4.5/5 stars
The Penguin Guide to Jazz Recordings	3/4 stars

J. J. Johnson's Jazz Quintets is a studio album by jazz trombonist J. J. Johnson, released by Savoy Records, containing material from three different recording sessions in 1946, 1947 and 1949. Material from the first two sessions had been previously released on two Savoy EPs, New Trends In Jazz, Vol. 11 (Savoy XP 8047) and Birth of Bop, Vol. 3 (Savoy XP 8086). The album was re-issued on CD in 1992, and again in 1994 on the Savoy Jazz label.

== Track listing ==
This is the track list for the CD re-issue. All songs were written by J. J. Johnson, except where noted.

1. "Jay Bird" – 2:56
2. "Coppin' the Bop" (Max Roach) – 2:57
3. "Jay Jay" – 3:04
4. "Mad Be Bop" – 2:38
5. "Boneology" – 2:57
6. "Down Vernon's Alley" – 2:32
7. "Audubon" (Sonny Rollins) – 2:45
8. "Don't Blame Me" (Jimmy McHugh, Dorothy Fields) – 2:46
9. "Goof Square" (Rollins) – 2:23
10. "Bee Jay" – 2:24
11. "Yesterdays" (Jerome Kern, Otto Harbach) – 2:57
12. "Riffette" – 2:25

== Personnel ==
- J. J. Johnson – trombone

June 26, 1946, tracks 1–4 (New Trends In Jazz, Vol. 11)

- Cecil Payne – alto sax
- Bud Powell – piano
- Leonard Gaskin – bass
- Max Roach – drums

December 24, 1947, tracks 5–6, 11–12 (Birth of Bop, Vol. 3)

- Leo Parker – baritone sax
- Hank Jones – piano
- Al Lucas – bass
- Shadow Wilson – drums

May 11, 1949, tracks 7–10

- Sonny Rollins – tenor sax
- John Lewis – piano
- Gene Ramey – bass
- Shadow Wilson – drums
