= Arun Luthra =

Aruṇ Lūthrā
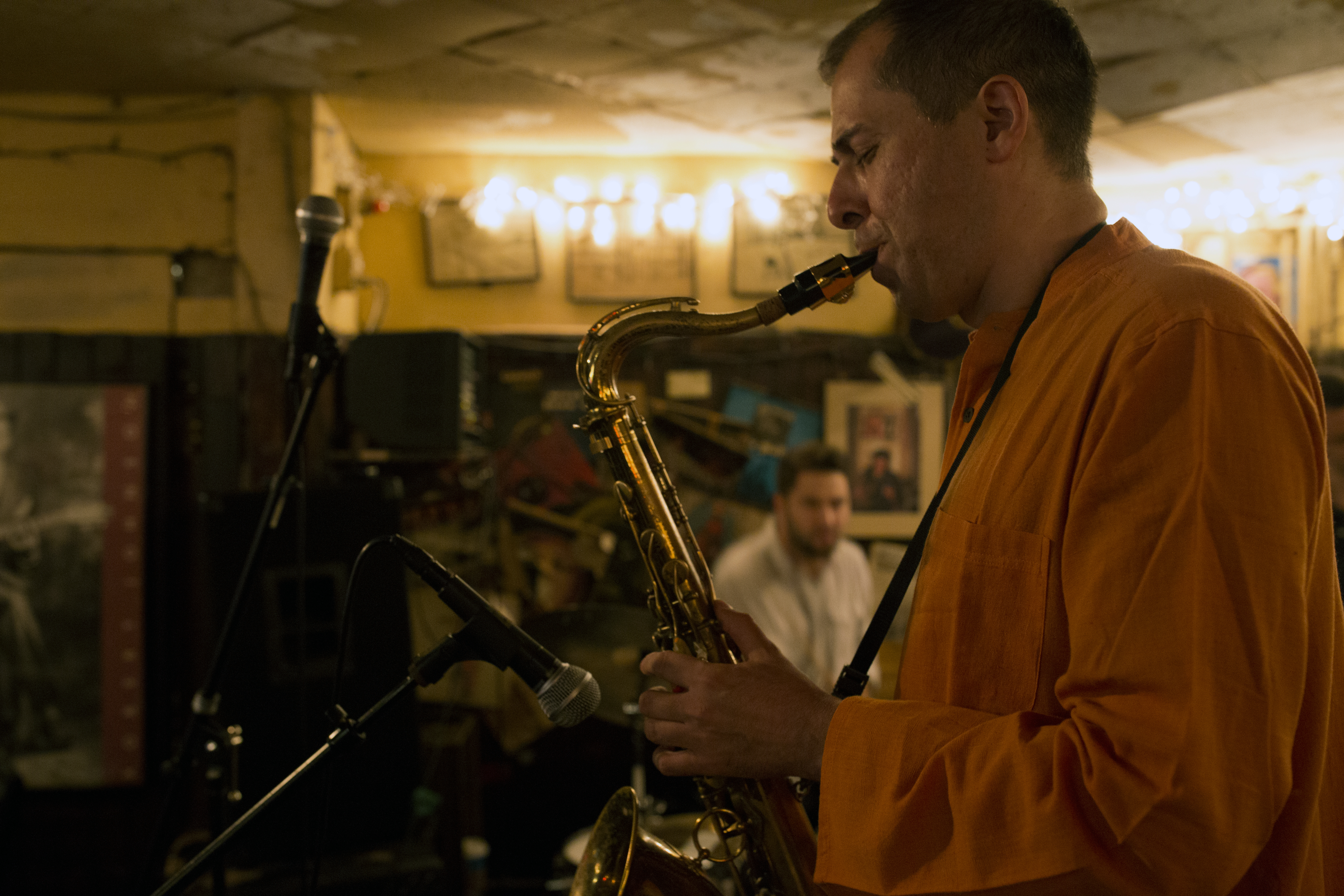
- Aruṇ Lūthrā performing at The 55 Bar, New York City in 2017

Background information
- Genres: Black American Music, Carnatic music, world music
- Occupation: Musician
- Instruments: Tenor saxophone, soprano saxophone, konnakol
- Years active: 1990–present
- Website: www.arunluthra.net

Aruṇ Lūthrā (Hindi: अरुण लूथरा) is a saxophonist, konnakol artist, composer, and bandleader based in New York City.

== Early life ==
Lūthrā was born in the United States into a multicultural family. His father was of Punjabi descent, and his mother was of English, Scottish, and German descent. Both of his parents spent their formative years in British Kenya, where they met. The family later moved to the United Kingdom, and eventually the United States, where Lūthrā was born. The family eventually moved to Belgium when Lūthrā was a toddler, where he learned to play a wide range of instruments. His family eventually moved back to the United States when he was a teenager.

== Career ==
He has worked with Billy Harper, Eddie Henderson, Kenny Garrett, Dennis Irwin, Joe Chambers, Charli Persip, Portinho, Zé Renato, The Temptations, The Four Tops, Frankie Valli, Bobby Short, Lew Soloff, Bernard Purdie and Ray Vega.

Lūthrā has also performed or studied with the Hindustani and Carnatic musicians Selvaganesh Vinayakram, Pandit Trichy Sankaran, Pandit Samir Chatterjee, Krishnan Lalgudi & Vijayalakshmi Lalgudi, Pandit Karaikudi Subramaniam, Steve Gorn, Kiran Ahluwalia, Sufi singer Zila Khan, and Asha Puthli.

Lūthrā was interviewed by Linus Wyrsch on The Jazz Hole for Breakthruradio.

Lūthrā was named the 2017–2018 composer-in-residence at Flushing Town Hall by Exploring the Metropolis. In conjunction with this he was awarded a 2018 New Work Grant by the Queens Council on the Arts to premiere the music composed during his composer residency. In 2021 Lūthrā was named the Interdisciplinary Artist-in-Residence at the University of Wisconsin-Madison's Division of the Arts. In 2022 Lūthrā was for the second time awarded a New Work Grant by the Queens Council on the Arts – this time to continue developing his large-scale multimedia work "Many Streams One River, Many Branches One Tree".

== Discography ==
=== As leader ===
- Tangibility (SaReGaMa, 2003)
- Louder Than Words with Rachel Eckroth (SaReGaMa, 2009)
- Live in New York (SaReGaMa, 2019)

=== As sideman ===
- David Rozenblatt, Dirty Wire (Mishigas Music)
- Red Baraat, Bootleg Bhangra (Sinj 2011)
- Red Baraat, Chaal Baby (Sinj, 2010)
- Red Baraat, Shruggy Ji (Sinj, 2013)
- Björkestra, Enjoy (Koch, 2008)
- Billy Fox The Uncle Wiggly Suite (Clean Feed, 2007)
- Mosaïc Orchestra, The Journey (Blue Lemon)
- New York Funk Exchange, Funkonomic Stimulus Plan (Funk In Da Trunk)
- Quimbombó, Conga Eléctrica (Testa Dura)
- David Rozenblatt, Music for Dwight Rhoden's Ballet Othello (Mishigas Music)
- Russ Spiegel Jazz Orchestra, Transplants (Ruzztone Music)
- Russ Spiegel Sextet, Chimera (Steeplechase)
- Doug Lawrence & His Orchestra, Big Band Swing
- New York Funk Exchange, Funkanomic Stimulus Plan
- Karl Wenninger's Wake Up Call, Wake Up Call (Bancroft)
- Broadway's Greatest Gift: Carols For A Cure, Vol. 9
- Charlie Porter Septet E.P.
- Dan Brodsky, Up In the Air E.P.
