= Frank-ly Speaking =

Studio album by Horace Parlan
- Released: 1977
- Recorded: February 5, 1977
- Genre: Jazz
- Length: 56:11
- Label: SteepleChase

Horace Parlan chronology
No Blues (1975)	Frank-ly Speaking (1977)	Goin' Home (1977)

Frank-ly Speaking is an album by American jazz pianist Horace Parlan featuring performances recorded in the U.S. in 1977 and released on the Danish-based SteepleChase label.

== Reception ==
The AllMusic review by Ken Dryden awarded the album 4 stars, stating that "the playing is inspired throughout the date by everyone involved".

Professional ratings
Review scores
Source	Rating
AllMusic	4/5 stars
The Penguin Guide to Jazz Recordings	3/4 stars

== Track listing ==
1. "Frank-ly Speaking" (Horace Parlan) – 3:55
2. "Quietude" (Thad Jones) – 4:28
3. "Hit It" (Lisle Atkinson) – 6:29
4. "Mirror Lake" (Idrees Sulieman) – 8:18
5. "Chocolate Cadillac" (Sulieman) – 10:04
6. "Misty Thursday" (Duke Jordan) – 6:39
7. "U.A.I." (Sulieman) – 7:22
8. "Veronica's Walk" (Tony Inzalaco) – 8:56

== Personnel ==
- Horace Parlan – piano
- Frank Strozier – alto saxophone
- Frank Foster – tenor saxophone
- Lisle Atkinson – bass
- Al Harewood – drums
