= Autumn Leaves (magazine) =

Children's magazine of the Reorganized Church of Jesus Christ of Latter Day Saints

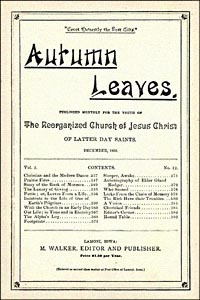

Autumn Leaves (1888–1929) was the first children's magazine of the Reorganized Church of Jesus Christ of Latter Day Saints (RLDS Church). The magazine was published in Lamoni, Iowa, and edited by Marietta Walker, who was an assistant editor for Zion's Hope and worked with the church throughout her life.

The main purpose of Autumn Leaves was to prepare young men and women for adult life and responsibility. This included many references that younger people would be able to relate to. In the history of this magazine there has been 45 volumes released each discussing important life lessons one may endure in their adult life. In 1929, the magazine was renamed Vision, and it was discontinued in 1932. The magazine included many notable writers but the most famous was Joseph Smith III, who was the President of the RLDS Church and the founder of Graceland University.

== History ==
=== Salutatory (Summary) ===
The magazine began in January 1888 and continued through the First World War, and then made its way through to the early 1930s where it was discontinued due to the editor Marietta Walker passing away a few years earlier. The magazine was aimed more towards younger men and women, hence why most of the stories talked about adulthood. In the Salutatory, Walker talks about young men and women and how they will face many challenges. Walker focuses mainly on how if they are untrained for the adult world then life will be much harder and stressful. Another important reason why Walker wrote Autumn Leaves was to help younger people appreciate the beauty in God's works and so that they may find their true potential.

== Significance in the Church ==
The magazine played an important role in the RLDS Church. It was the first magazine for children in the church. This allowed the younger generations to be able to learn the ways of the church more effectively.
