= All God's Chillun Got Wings (song) =

African-american spiritual song

"All God's Chillun Got Wings" is a Negro spiritual song. "Chillun" is an old-fashioned dialect word for "children". (Robeson sings it as "children" in his recording, although the printed lyrics say "chillun".)

Its title inspired the 1924 Eugene O'Neill play All God's Chillun Got Wings.
