= Benny Harris =

American jazz musician (1919–1975)

- Born: April 23, 1919; New York City, U.S.
- Died: May 11, 1975 (aged 56) San Francisco, U.S.
- Genres: Bebop jazz
- Occupations: Musician and composer
- Instrument: Trumpet

"Little" Benny Harris (April 23, 1919 in New York City – May 11, 1975 in San Francisco) was an American bebop trumpeter and composer.

A self-taught musician, Benny Harris was already playing with Thelonious Monk in the mid-1930s. In later years, he participated in some of the jam sessions that gave birth to the bebop jazz style. Reportedly, it was Harris that persuaded Dizzy Gillespie of Charlie Parker's ability by playing one of Parkers's improvisations to Gillespie.

Harris's first major gig was in 1939 with Tiny Bradshaw. He played with Earl Hines on and off from 1941 to 1945, and worked the 52nd Street bebop circuit in New York City in the 1940s, where he collaborated with Benny Carter, John Kirby, Coleman Hawkins, Don Byas, and Thelonious Monk. He was with Boyd Raeburn from 1944 to 1945 and Clyde Hart in 1944; he and Byas worked together again in 1945. He played less in the late 1940s, though he appeared with Dizzy Gillespie in 1949 and Charlie Parker in 1952. Michael Cuscuna reports that Harris was still performing around New York in 1957 (at the Blue Morocco jazz club in the Bronx), entertaining relationships with fellow musicians such as Tina Brooks. However, he appears to have never recorded again.

Harris is better known for his compositions than as an instrumentalist. These pieces include "Ornithology" (a signature Charlie Parker tune), "Crazeology", "Reets and I" (a Bud Powell favorite), and "Wahoo" (originally known as "Donby", extrapolated from a line by Ted Sturgis).

== Discography ==
- Don Byas, Jazz...Free and Easy (Regent, 1957)
- Dizzy Gillespie, The Complete RCA Victor Recordings (Bluebird, 1995)
- Earl Hines, Piano Man (Bluebird, 1989)
- Charlie Parker, Fiesta (Verve, 1957)
- Bud Powell, Bebop (Pablo, 2004)
- Boyd Raeburn, Boyd Meets Stravinski (Savoy, 1955)
