= All God's Chillun Got Wings (play) =

1924 play by Eugene O'Neill

First edition cover (published by Boni and Liveright)

All God's Chillun Got Wings (1924) is an expressionist play by Eugene O'Neill about miscegenation. Inspired by a Negro spiritual, O'Neill began developing ideas for the play in 1922, emphasising its authenticity in his notes: "Play of Johnny T. – negro who married white woman – base play on his experience as I have seen it intimately – but no reproduction, see it only as man's."

O'Neill wrote the play in the autumn of 1923 and revised it slightly for its 1924 publication. One of his most controversial works, the premiere starred Paul Robeson in the role of Jim, the Black husband of an abusive White woman who, out of resentment of his color, destroys his promising career as a lawyer.

== Characters ==
- Jim Harris – Ella's husband. An African-American man attempting to pass the law school examinations, he is protective of Ella and submissive to her demands.
- Mrs. Harris – Jim and Hattie's mother. An older woman who doesn't think that the races should mix.
- Hattie – Jim's sister. Hattie doesn't approve of Jim and Ella's marriage and feels that Ella is abusing Jim.
- Ella Downey – Jim's wife. She is uncomfortable being Jim's wife and wants to control him throughout the play.
- Shorty – Ella's childhood friend. A White gangster who offers Ella work as a prostitute.
- Joe – Jim's childhood friend. An African-American gangster who is mad at Jim for trying to use education to escape from his life.
- Mickey – Ella's childhood friend. He is a boxer who leaves Ella after she becomes pregnant with his child.

== Plot summary ==
The play is divided into two acts that are further broken up into seven scenes, and it opens up on an integrated corner in the south of New York. There are three converging streets that form at the edge of a triangular building. Though integrated, the people separate themselves by race, Black on one end, White on the other except for the kids that are playing marbles between one another in the center. Scene one begins with an introduction to the main and supporting characters: Jim, Ella, Mickey, Joe, and Shorty. Jim and Ella are singled out as liking each other, and they bond over being called "Painty Face" and "Crow".

In scene two, it is nine years later and takes place on the same corner, which showcases the technological advances—horse and buggy become automobiles. The relationship between Jim and Ella has changed. Jim is pining for Ella's recognition, and Shorty and Joe question his blackness because of his desire to graduate and pass the bar exam. It seems as if he has fallen prey to Shorty's degradation of his ability and potential. It is also revealed that Ella is in a relationship with Mickey.

In scene three, the setting is the same but five years later. The people on the streets appear even more tired. It starts out with Shorty and Ella discussing the breakup with Mickey and reveals that she had a child only to lose it to diphtheria. The scene also goes on to show the somewhat mended relationship between Ella and Jim which in turn causes her to lose her relationship with her parents. When Jim enters the scene, he mentions how he failed the bar exam yet again. Jim explains that the reason behind him not passing is his feeling of inferiority to the other students and not his lack of knowledge. Ella does not appear to be upset over this and tries to encourage him by referring to him as "White". This portion ends with Jim asking her whether or not she would marry him, and she replies with a yes.

In scene four, the scene has changed and is instead in front of a church a few weeks later. Jim and Ella have married and the fear inside Ella is obvious. The two of them are headed towards the steamer to leave New York, and Joe is optimistic.

Act II

In scene one, it is two years later, and two new characters are introduced, Jim's mother Mrs. Harris and his sister Hattie. They live in a home with decorations that give an air of wealth but are obviously cheaply made. The two start out talking about the arrival of Jim and Ella. Mrs. Harris mentions Hattie's defiance to the marriage between the two. Hattie and her mother both agree that there should be union between the two races. They continue to talk about the place to which Jim and Ella moved, accept the interracial marriage, and then argue over whether they should stay away or come back. Hattie believes Jim should face the prejudice head-on. Jim enters and explains that Ella grew lonely and afraid being in France, and Jim feels that it was because of him. Hattie prods for the truth of whether Ella loves him or not. This infuriates Jim, but he reveals that they indeed moved back so he could face everything that he believed was making his wife sick in addition to taking the bar exam. Ella enters and runs to Jim with a distaste that upsets Hattie, but they try to reminisce and remain civil with each other. Hattie is asked about what she has accomplished, and she proudly says that she has been studying and became a teacher of a colored school. Just like with Jim, Ella tries to degrade her accomplishments and uses the failure of her husband to make her feel better about Hattie's success. The appearance of a tribal mask shocks Ella, and she stresses how Jim isn't going to take the exam. This scene ends with Hattie and Mrs. Harris leaving the apartment and giving it to Ella and Jim as a gift.

In scene two, both Jim and Ella are still in the apartment, but it is six months later. Jim is seen with law books stacked around him. Hattie enters the room with Jim and proceeds to ask him about Ella's condition, which has worsened. That leads his sister to suggest that he leave her because he is likely to get sick as well. It is revealed that she has developed mania and has sunk to calling Hattie derogatory words. Jim has in turn thrown Hattie out for trying to separate them. After Hattie is forced out, Ella enters with a knife in hand and asks Jim to be Uncle Jim and for her to be the little girl. As she is almost coaxed into bed, she calls Jim a nigger, and the scene ends with Jim in emotional agony.

In scene three, it is six months later, and Ella appears even more sick than before and approaches the tribal mask with a deranged demeanor. Ella exposes her true feelings towards Jim taking the bar exam and Black people succeeding. Jim enters with a letter that held his results of the examination, which he failed. The play ends with the revelations that Jim decided against retaking the exam and that Ella wants to go back to the time where she was referred to as "Painty Face" and Jim as "Crow".

== Analysis of play ==
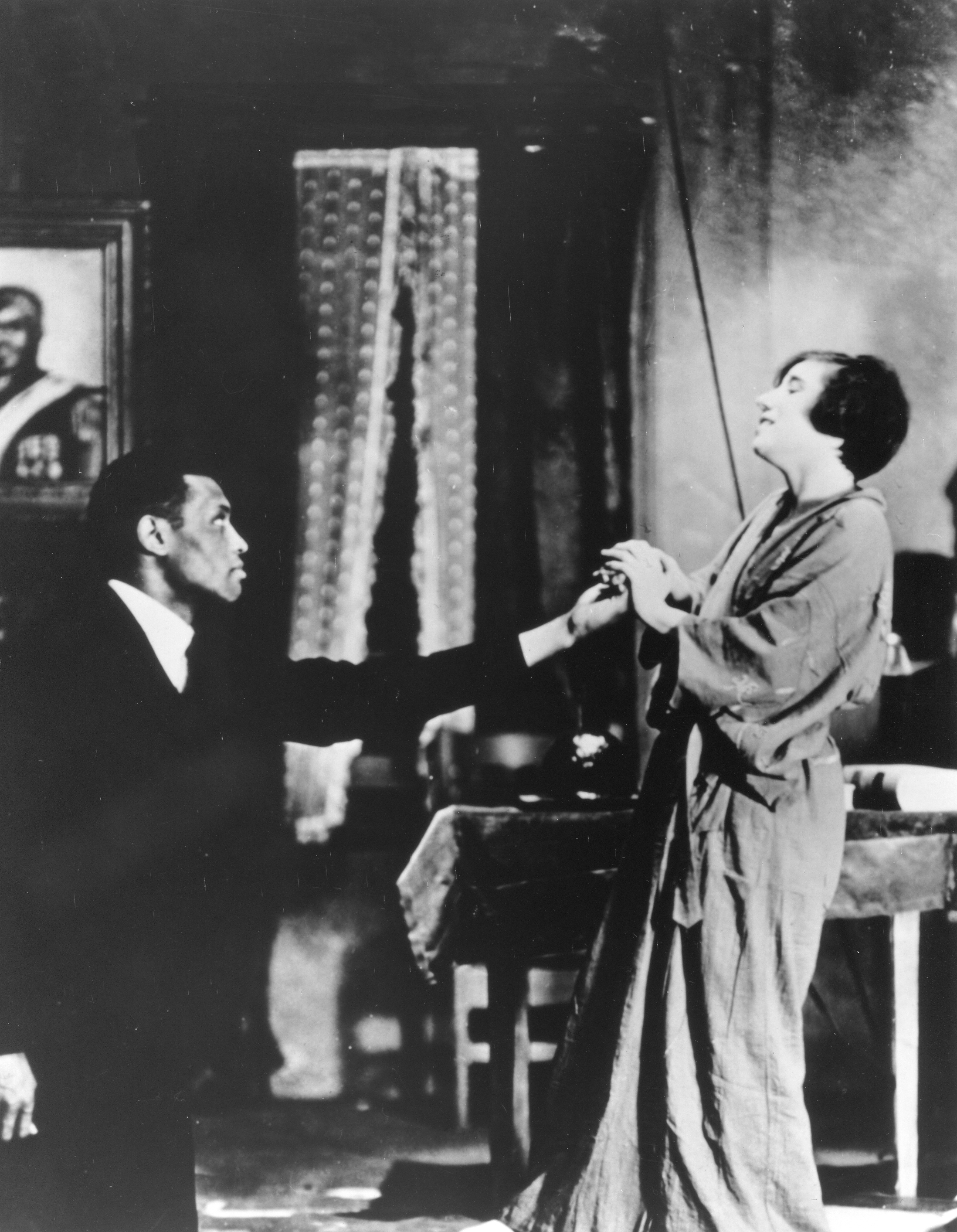
Scene in O'Neill's All God's Chillun' Got Wings in which Paul Robeson had his hand kissed by Mary Blair created a national uproar.

The main conflict in the story is the racism of the time. Jim is seen being threatened by the White characters throughout the play. Hattie gets into fights with Ella, defending her race from Ella's attacks. Not only does the play cover the tensions between White and Black, but also the conflicts among those in each race. Joe gets into a fight with Jim because of Jim's drive for success. Joe sees this as Jim trying to get away from his life as an African American. Ella is berated by Shorty when he discovers that she is having a relationship with Jim. She is called a "Nigger-lover", and his tone changes from friendly to confrontational.

Critics have claimed that, not unlike his other plays, O'Neill lived for controversy, and instead of creating a social commentary, he was just feeding cultural stereotypes because of his ignorance to African-American culture. The play's opening playbill included a W. E. B. Du Bois excerpt.

Other critics have mentioned that Ella and Jim are actually a depiction of Ella and James, O'Neill's parents. Because of the abusive relationship between Jim and Ella in the play, critics thought that it represented the relationship between his parents.

== Themes and political context ==
As the last play of O'Neill that casts a black lead, All God's Chillun Got Wings discussed the intraracial and interracial issues that plagued American society in the early twentieth century. O'Neill gave glimpses of the struggle of being black in the time period and what the implications of being in a relationship with someone of the opposite race would entail.

W.J. Arnold, one of the founders of the Daughters of the Confederacy, said about the play at the time:

The scene where Miss Blair is called upon to kiss and fondle a Negro's hand is going too far, even for the stage. The play may be produced above the Mason and Dixie [sic] line, but Mr. O'Neill will not get the friendly reception he had when he sent 'Emperor Jones' his other coloured play into the South. The play should be banned by the authorities, because it will be impossible for it to do otherwise than stir up ill feeling between the races.

In the book Black Manhattan, author James Weldon Johnson stated that the New York American and The Morning Telegraph newspapers published articles about the play in an attempt to stir up a violent reaction so that public outrage would cause the play to be censored. Towards the end of the 1910s and the beginning of the 1920s, "random and organized acts of violence" were waged against the African-American community. The twenties were also a time where the Ku Klux Klan was at its height, and the talk of integration clashed with a culture practicing segregation.

== Performances ==
The play debuted on May 15, 1924, at the Provincetown Playhouse in Greenwich Village, New York, closing on October 24. The production was directed by James Light.

A London production at the Gate Theatre Studio played a short run in 1926. On June 17, 1929, the play was produced at London's Royal Court Theatre, running for 24 performances and closing on 6 July. Jim was played by Frank H. Wilson and Ella by Beatrix Lehmann. On February 15, 1929, it opened at Moscow's Kamerny Theatre, directed by Alexander Tairov. A naturalistic production at London's Unity Theatre in 1946 starred Robert Adams as Jim and Louie Bradley as Ella, with Ted Willis directing.

Trish Van Devere played in a 1975 Broadway revival, along with Robert Earl Jones, Jimmy Baio, and Kathy Rich. In 2013, Devin Haqq and Barbra Wengerd appeared in a production directed by Godfrey L. Simmons, Jr. for Civic Ensemble at JACK, a performance venue, in Brooklyn, New York.
