= Jon Metzger =

American musician and educator

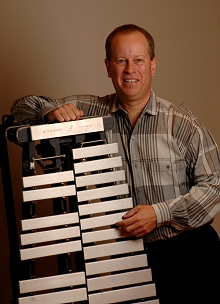
Jon Metzger, vibraphonist

Jon Metzger (born July 30, 1959) is an American jazz vibraphonist, composer, author, and educator.

== Biography ==
Metzger was raised in McLean, Virginia, and received early musical influence from his mother, Evelyn Metzger, who was a violinist and pianist. His early music training included piano lessons, participation in the Washington, D.C. Youth Orchestra Program (where he played the mallet percussion instruments for the first time), and private percussion study with Al Merz of the National Symphony. He attended the Potomac School and at age 15 was permitted to keep the school's vibraphone at home over the summer. His older sister took him to a concert by vibraphonist Milt Jackson at Blues Alley in Washington, D.C.

Metzger attended Langley High School where he played in the jazz ensemble under the direction of trumpeter George Horan. In 1981 he completed a Bachelor of Music degree at the North Carolina School of the Arts in Winston-Salem where he studied primarily with J. Massie Johnson. He attended master classes with marimbists Gordon Stout and Leigh Howard Stevens and vibraphonists Milt Jackson, Gary Burton, and Dave Samuels. As a college student, he began working in North Carolina's central Piedmont region around the School of the Arts, forming his quartet and developing original repertoire.

He recorded Jon Metzger/Vibes, his first album as a leader, in 1984 in New York City with pianist Phil Markowitz, bassist Marc Johnson, and drummer Ted Moore. Out of the Dark with pianist Fred Hersch, bassist Marc Johnson, and drummer Joey Baron was funded by a National Endowment for the Arts fellowship and released by VSOP Records in 1986. He has recorded as a leader and as a sideman for the Summit, Soul Note, Jazz Karma, and Elon Improvibes labels with John Brown, Ron Elliston, Cyrus Chestnut, Neena Freelon, Vincent Gardner, Danny Gottlieb, Allison Miller, Herlin Riley, Claire Ritter, Ronnie Wells, and Jack Wilkins.

Metzger has toured extensively to jazz clubs and festivals in the US and abroad, including as a jazz ambassador for the Department of State under the auspices of the United States Information Agency's Arts America Program, which from 1985–1995 included tours to Belize, Costa Rica, Guatemala, Honduras, Panama, Nicaragua, El Salvador, Columbia, Syria, Jordan, Oman, Saudi Arabia, Yemen, Bahrain, Morocco, Tunisia, Qatar, and the United Arab Emerites. In 2010 he was a Cultural Envoy to Haceteppe State University in Ankara, Turkey, where he worked with the faculty on the formation of their Jazz Studies program.

Metzger began teaching at Elon University in 1989. He was honored with Elon's Distinguished Scholar Award in 2005. He retired from Elon in 2021.

== Discography ==
=== As leader ===
- 1984 Jon Metzger/Vibes (Jonder Brook Productions)
- 1986 Out of the Dark (VSOP)
- 1988 Into the Light (VSOP)
- 1997 The Spinner (VSOP)
- 1998 Teach Me Tonight (Improvibes)
- 2001 Times Fly (Improvibes)
- 2003 Common Ground (Improvibes)

=== As guest ===
With Ronnie Wells

- 1989 For You, For Me, Forevermore (Jazz Karma)
- 1990 After the Lights Go Down Low (Jazz Karma)
- 1992 Live at Montpelier (Jazz Karma)
- 1992 Make Me a Present of You (Jazz Karma)
- 1994 After You (Jazz Karma)

With others

- 1990 Reiko, Howland Ensemble (Soul Note)
- 2003 10 Years in 5 Days, Howland Ensemble
- 2007 Waltzing the Splendor, Claire Ritter (Zoning)
- 2009 Insight at Midnight, Baron Tymas
- 2011 The Blue and Green Project, Jack Wilkins (Summit)
