= Third stream =

Musical genre

- Stylistic origins: Jazz; classical
- Cultural origins: United States
- Typical instruments: Instruments commonly used in jazz; instruments commonly used in classical music

Third stream is a music genre that is a fusion of jazz and classical music. The term was coined in 1957 by composer Gunther Schuller in a lecture at Brandeis University. There are many ways to define third-stream music. It could refer to a group of jazz musicians playing solely, or a jazz soloist performing with a symphony orchestra, as long as the musicians are able to interpret and play jazz music. Improvisation is generally seen as a vital component of third stream. In third-stream music, composers incorporate elements of classical music, such as the use of classical instruments and classical music forms, into their jazz compositions. The fusion of jazz and classical music is also viewed as "born out of a reciprocal interest: the interest of the classical community in the developments in jazz music and the interest of the jazz community in the advances of classical music." The innovative idea of fusing jazz and classical music pushed the boundaries of traditional classical music and introduced a new genre that blends the two styles into a unique hybrid form.

== Definition and critics ==
In 1961, Schuller defined third stream as "a new genre of music located about halfway between jazz and classical music". He insisted that "by definition there is no such thing as 'third stream jazz'". He noted that while critics on both sides of third stream objected to tainting their favorite music with the other, more strenuous objections were typically made by jazz musicians who felt such efforts were "an assault on their traditions". He wrote that "by designating the music as a 'separate, third stream', the other two mainstreams could go about their way unaffected by the attempts at fusion". Third-stream music emerged during a time when jazz was seeking recognition as a legitimate art form, and European musical traditions were still widely considered the standard by which all music was judged. The fusion of jazz and classical music, forming a new music genre, worsened the longstanding struggle of African American musicians to gain recognition for their art style within the mainstream of American culture.

Critics have argued that third stream—by drawing on two very different styles—dilutes the power of each in combining them. The jazz component of the music has been criticized for being too serious and not "swing" enough. Throughout the history of third-stream music style, bringing in two contrasting music styles forming a new music genre has not in general been welcomed by either camp, which has caused advocates and practitioners of this approach to face aesthetic battles on both sides. Others reject such notions and consider third stream an interesting musical development. In 1981, Schuller offered a list of "What Third Stream Is Not":

- It is not jazz with strings.
- It is not jazz played on "classical" instruments.
- It is not classical music played by jazz players.
- It is not inserting a bit of Ravel or Schoenberg between bebop changes—nor the reverse.
- It is not jazz in fugal form.
- It is not a fugue played by jazz players.
- It is not designed to do away with jazz or classical music; it is just another option amongst many for today's creative musicians.

In 2011, Gunther Schuller published his autobiography, A Life in Pursuit of Music and Beauty. In chapter 4, he describes discovering jazz music as a teenager and being fully attracted to Duke Ellington's music and how he was fascinated by its "freely, loosely, more personal" music style, which he had not experienced as a classical learner. Later, he discusses how he wanted to combine classical music and jazz together to produce a third-stream, and how he explored this music style in various creative ways. He also shares his experiences of wanting to make the New England Conservatory more inclusive by adding new programs and jazz-related courses when he was the president from 1967 to 1977.

== Compositions and recordings ==
Schuller led a group of musicians in recording the albums Music for Brass (1957) and Modern Jazz Concert (1958), later collected under one album, The Birth of the Third Stream. The first contained compositions by Schuller, J.J. Johnson, John Lewis, and Jimmy Giuffre. The second album combined jazz and classical musicians with compositions by Schuller, Giuffre, George Russell, Charles Mingus, Harold Shapero, and Milton Babbitt. This music was performed for the first time at the Brandeis Festival of the Arts in 1957 and inspired Schuller's comment about "a new synthesis". Composers who were influenced by Schuller's comments include Don Ellis, Eddie Sauter, William Russo, Andre Hodeir, Lalo Schifrin, Teo Macero, Gary McFarland, and Friedrich Gulda. Others influenced by Third Stream include Robert Prince, Ron Carter, Eddie Daniels, William Kanengiser, Jacques Loussier, Modern Jazz Quartet, James Newton, Ralph Towner, Turtle Island Quartet, Mary Lou Williams, Brad Mehldau, and Eberhard Weber and several other ECM Records artists; in Italy, among others, Bruno Tommaso, Gianluigi Trovesi, Andrea Pellegrini, Giorgio Gaslini.

Works that fall under the heading of third stream include Sketches of Spain by Miles Davis, The Gary McFarland Orchestra by Gary McFarland, Focus, a suite for saxophone and strings by Eddie Sauter; Transformation by Schuller, An Image of Man by William Russo, Reimagining Opera by Dario Savino Doronzo | Pietro Gallo, Piece for Clarinet and String Orchestra by Giuffre, Poem for Brass by J.J. Johnson, All About Rosie by George Russell, Seven Songs for Quartet and Chamber Orchestra by Gary Burton, Symbiosis by Claus Ogerman, and Arbour Zena by Keith Jarrett.

The piece Rhapsody in Blue composed by George Gershwin played an important role during the rise of third stream music. Its "Playful riffs, embellishments, and an extension of the central cadenza in the Rhapsody capture the listener's imagination". The piece combines elements of jazz and classical music, making it sound distinctive and unique. Its success marked a significant cultural shift in American society during the Jazz Age.

== Composers and performers ==
The Chicago Jazz Philharmonic, primarily performing compositions by its founder and Chicago based composer, trumpeter, and conductor Orbert Davis, is the only professional orchestra solely dedicated to performing Third Stream music in North America. The orchestra is composed of Chicago-based jazz and classical performers.

Paul Whiteman employed string sections in his jazz bands in the 1920s, as did Artie Shaw in the 1940s. These musicians had written parts and supported the improvisers. More dramatic attempts to bridge jazz and classical were made by Charlie Parker in 1949 and in the 1950s by J. J. Johnson, John Lewis, and William Russo.

George Gershwin blended jazz and symphonic music in Rhapsody in Blue (1924). French composer Darius Milhaud used jazz-inspired elements, including a jazz fugue, in La création du monde. Igor Stravinsky drew from jazz for Ragtime, Piano-Rag-Music, and the Ebony Concerto composed for clarinetist Woody Herman and his orchestra in 1945. Other composers who used jazz include George Antheil, Leonard Bernstein, Aaron Copland, Morton Gould, Paul Hindemith, Ernst Krenek, Bohuslav Martinů, Maurice Ravel, Dmitri Shostakovich, William Grant Still, and Kurt Weill. Although few of these examples can be classified third stream, they demonstrate interest and appreciation for jazz among classical composers. Mary Lou Williams's Zodiac Suite, which fused classical and jazz music and was performed by a symphony orchestra, is cited as a forerunner of third stream music.

Reginald Foresythe was among the first musicians to combine the two genres, beginning in the 1930s. He called his style "The New Music". Critics praised "Garden of Weed" "Serenade for a Wealthy Widow" and the Bach-influenced "Dodging a Divorcee", but the British public was baffled. Foresythe's music found a warmer reception in America, resulting in collaborations with Ellington, Benny Goodman, and Earl Hines. Artie Shaw recorded "Interlude in B-flat" in 1935 with the unusual ensemble of a string quartet, a jazz rhythm section, and Shaw on clarinet and saxophone. Although not third stream in conception, pianist Art Tatum drew on classical technique and recorded jazz versions of short pieces by European composers Antonín Dvořák, Jules Massenet, and Anton Rubinstein.

A fusion of jazz with contemporary classical music came from the pen of Pete Rugolo, chief architect of the Stan Kenton Progressive Jazz Orchestra from 1947 to 1948 and the Innovations in Modern Music Orchestra of 1950 and 1951. A student of Milhaud, Rugolo studied the scores of Debussy, Ravel, and Stravinsky. The exploratory works of Robert Graettinger for Kenton from 1947 to 1952 combine contemporary classical techniques. His use of colorful graphs and charts for big band took his music into a harmonic and rhythmic realm unknown in jazz. Duke Ellington's music has been compared with that of classical composers Debussy, Ravel, and Frederick Delius in impressionistic work such as "Mood Indigo", "Dusk", and "Reflections in D", as well as in more extended composed works such as "Creole Rhapsody", "Reminiscing in Tempo", and "The Tattooed Bride". These tendencies were shared by his collaborator, composer Billy Strayhorn. Nikolai Kapustin writes fully notated music in a jazz idiom that fuses the Russian piano tradition with the virtuosic styles of Art Tatum and Oscar Peterson.

Composer Krzysztof Penderecki experimented with compositionally guided free jazz improvisation in his "Actions for Free Jazz Orchestra". Hans Werner Henze brought free jazz into his compositions in Der langwierige Weg in die Wohnung der Natascha Ungeheuer.

American classical and jazz pianist and composer, Uri Caine, released his album Uri Caine Ensemble Plays Mozart in 2006. This album is a fusion of classical music and jazz, which his ensemble reinterpreting pieces from Mozart's works through a jazz approach.

== New England Conservatory of Music ==
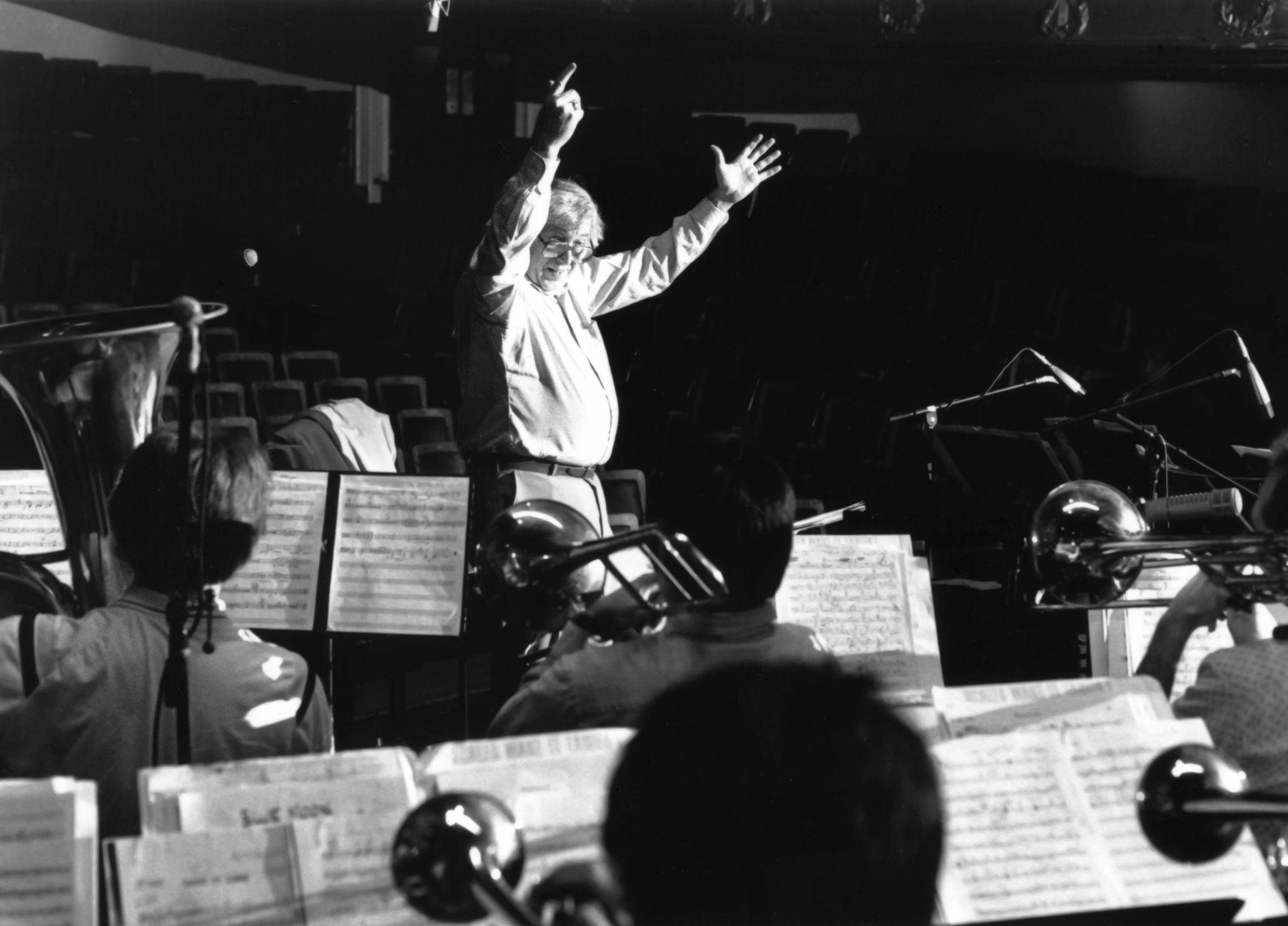
Gunther Schuller leads NEC Jazz Orchestra in rehearsal in Jordan Hall, 1990.

During his tenure as president of the New England Conservatory of Music (NEC) in Boston, Gunther Schuller established a Third Stream Department with associated degree programs, appointing pianist-composer Ran Blake as department chair in 1973. Blake would continue to lead this unique department (eventually renamed Contemporary Improvisation, now Contemporary Musical Arts) until his retirement in 2005, meanwhile broadening the concept to center on the "primacy of the ear", development of personal style, and improvisation, drawing on inspiration from all musics of the world. Faculty members have included a number of highly influential performer-composers including Jaki Byard, George Russell, and Hankus Netsky (who later became chair). Notable alumni include performers and ethnomusicologists, including Don Byron, Christine Correa, Dominique Eade, Matt Darriau, and many others.

== See also ==
- Partimento
- Musical improvisation#Classical period

== Sources ==
- Encyclopædia Britannica entry.
- Gunther Schuller: Musings: The Musical Worlds of Gunther Schuller; Oxford University Press, 1986; 0195037456.
- Yannow, Scott. Allmusic.com.
