= Painted Rhythms =

Painted Rhythms may refer to:

- Painted Rhythms: The Compleat Ran Blake, Volume 1, a 1985 Ran Blake album
- Painted Rhythms: The Compleat Ran Blake, Volume 2, a 1985 Ran Blake album
