= The Newest Sound Around =

Studio album by Jeanne Lee and Ran Blake
- Released: 1962
- Recorded: November 15 – December 7, 1961
- Studio: RCA Victor Studio, New York City
- Genre: Jazz
- Label: RCA Victor; LSP-2500
- Producer: George Avakian

Jeanne Lee chronology
The Newest Sound Around (1962)	Conspiracy (1974)

Ran Blake chronology
The Newest Sound Around (1962)	Ran Blake Plays Solo Piano (1965)

The Newest Sound Around is an album by singer Jeanne Lee and pianist Ran Blake. It was recorded in November and December, 1961, at RCA Victor Studio in New York City, and was released by RCA Victor in 1962. The album, which was the debut recording for both musicians, was reissued on CD in 1987 with four extra tracks, and with the title The Legendary Duets. Bassist George Duvivier is featured on two tracks.

Lee and Blake met while students at Bard College, and, as a duo, won the Wednesday night Apollo Theater amateur contest, leading to a record deal with RCA. A followup album by the duo titled The Newest Sound You Never Heard was recorded in 1966 and 1967 but was not released until 2019. Lee and Blake also recorded the album You Stepped Out of a Cloud in 1989.

== Reception ==
Professional ratings
Review scores
Source	Rating
AllMusic	4.5/5 stars
The Penguin Guide to Jazz	3/4 stars

In a review for AllMusic, Andrew Hamlin wrote: "'Third stream' may have been the bandied term, but this unjustly ignored 1962 duet set... plays blissfully free of the lumbering lugubriousness and Big Mac-thick philosophizing that mar so much of that music. The eeriness, the mystery, and the sweetness lie always in the deceptive simplicity... The record started no revolution, probably because no other two performers had such chemistry or such a distinctive reaction. As jazz styling, though, it endures unsurprisingly. You hear the set in less than one hour... You spend decades wandering inside the sound, as you might inside a sonic Stonehenge, savoring each new vantage point discovered, and the impossibility of discovering them all."

The authors of the Penguin Guide to Jazz Recordings stated: "Blake recorded many fascinating duo performances over the years... This, though, was pretty much where it all got started... Much of the material is repertory or traditional stuff...though there is a thoughtful reading of 'Blue Monk'... but the highlight has to be 'He's Got the Whole World in his Hands,' transformed into something wry and joyous by turns. Lee was never excessively theatrical, though her articulation derives more from speech rhythms than from bel canto or traditional jazz singing; Blake swings even when he sounds most abstract. And there's plenty of humour from both of them. Not the best recording, but the music comes through strongly."

Ben Ratliff, writing for The New York Times, called the album "a cult favorite," and stated: "In jazz standards and Thelonious Monk tunes on the album, Ms. Lee and Mr. Blake subtracted swing, but added intellectual coolness, abstruse piano harmonies and vocal influences from Holiday and Washington; the record is a series of minimalist dreams."

In an article for The New York Review, Adam Shatz wrote that the album "in its mélange of youthful effervescence and noir fatalism, captured the sensibility of New York bohemia as much as John Cassavetes's Shadows or James Baldwin's Another Country." He continued: "On that album... Lee and Blake approached each other not as singer and accompanist but as highly interactive improvisers, taking apart standards... and rearranging them like a pair of musical Cubists. Full of whimsical, often violent contrasts in color and dynamics, Blake's playing was an eccentric, fractured collage of twentieth-century modernism, Thelonious Monk, gospel, and film music. His spiky, unresolved style found a perfect foil in the serenity and poise of Lee's singing and in her precise, sensuous diction."

== Track listing ==
=== Original LP release ===
1. "Laura" (Johnny Mercer, David Raksin) – 5:06
2. "Blue Monk" (Thelonious Monk) – 4:40
3. "Church On Russell Street" (Ran Blake) – 3:12
4. "Where Flamingos Fly" (Elthea Peale, Harold Courlander, John Benson Brooks) – 4:17
5. "Season In The Sun" (Fran Landesman, Tommy Wolf) – 2:25
6. "Summertime" (DuBose Heyward, George Gershwin) – 3:30
7. "Lover Man" (Jimmy Davis, Ram Ramirez, Jimmy Sherman) – 5:00
8. "Evil Blues" (Ran Blake, Guy Freedman, Jeanne Lee) – 3:04
9. "Sometimes I Feel Like a Motherless Child" (traditional) – 2:37
10. "When Sunny Gets Blue" (Jack Segal, Marvin Fisher) – 4:51
11. "Love Isn't Everything" (Patty McGovern) – 1:20

=== Bonus tracks on 1987 CD release ===
12. "Vanguard" (Ran Blake) – 3:12
13. "Left Alone" (Billie Holiday, Mal Waldron) – 2:51
14. "He's Got the Whole World in His Hands" (traditional) – 2:04
15. "Straight Ahead" (Abbey Lincoln, Mal Waldron) – 3:08

== Personnel ==
- Jeanne Lee – vocals
- Ran Blake – piano
- George Duvivier – bass (tracks 5 and 8)
