= Breakthru (Ran Blake album) =

Studio album by Ran Blake
- Released: 1976
- Recorded: December 2 & 5, 1975; Bendiksen Studio in Oslo, Norway
- Genre: Jazz
- Length: 37:43
- Label: Improvising Artists; IAI 373842
- Producer: Paul Bley

Ran Blake chronology
| The Blue Potato and Other Outrages... (1969) | Breakthru (1976) | Wende (1977) |

Breakthru is an album of solo piano performances by the American jazz pianist Ran Blake recorded in 1975 and released on the Improvising Artists label.

== Reception ==
Professional ratings
Review scores
| Source | Rating |
|---|---|
| AllMusic | 4/5 stars |

Scott Yanow of AllMusic stated, "Blake's emotional playing (which emphasizes the contrast between silence and explosive sounds) is both witty and unpredictable... Intriguing music".

== Track listing ==
1. "Breakthru" (Ran Blake) - 1:35
2. "You Stepped Out of a Dream" (Nacio Herb Brown, Gus Kahn) - 3:47
3. "If Dreams Come True" (Benny Goodman, Irving Mills, Edgar Sampson) - 2:23
4. "No Good Man" (Irene Higginbotham, Sammy Gallop, Dan Fisher) - 3:00
5. "All the Things You Are" (Oscar Hammerstein II, Jerome Kern) - 2:28
6. "Wish I Could Talk to You Baby" (Leon Sylvers III) - 4:58
7. "Grey December" (Frank Campo) - 3:10
8. "Spinning Wheel" (David Clayton-Thomas) - 2:00
9. "Sophisticated Lady" (Duke Ellington, Mills, Mitchell Parish) - 2:36
10. "Manhattan Memories: Bird Blues" (Blake) - 1:10
11. "Manhattan Memories: Bebopper" (George Gordon, Sonnie Leonard) - 1:45
12. "Manhattan Memories: Drop Me Off in Harlem" (Ellington, Nick Kenny) - 1:10
13. "All About Ronnie" (Joe Greene) - 2:30
14. "What Are You Doing the Rest of Your Life?" (Alan and Marilyn Bergman, Michel Legrand) - 2:50
15. "Parker's Mood" (Charlie Parker) - 3:41
16. "Tea for Two" (Irving Caesar, Vincent Youmans) - 2:45

== Personnel ==
- Ran Blake – piano
