= All That Is Tied =

Studio album by Ran Blake
- Released: March 7, 2006
- Recorded: 2005
- Genre: Jazz
- Length: 43:11
- Label: Tompkins Square TSQ1965
- Producer: Jonah Kraut and Ran Blake

Ran Blake chronology
Cinema Chatelet (2006)	All That Is Tied (2006)	Driftwoods (2009)

All That Is Tied is a solo album by pianist Ran Blake which was recorded in 2005 to mark the 40th anniversary of his first solo recording Ran Blake Plays Solo Piano and his 70th birthday and was released on the Tompkins Square label in 2006.

== Reception ==
Professional ratings
Review scores
Source	Rating
Allmusic	4.5/5 stars
All About Jazz	4.5/5 stars
Penguin Guide to Jazz	👑

The Penguin Guide to Jazz gave the album a maximum four star rating, and additionally awarded it a "Crown", signifying a recording that the authors "feel a special admiration or affection for". The Allmusic review by Stewart Mason awarded the album 4 1/2 stars stating "All That Is Tied touches on every facet of Blake's unique piano style, summing up this underrated composer and educator's career in the space of 12 brief original compositions". On All About Jazz Norman Weinstein noted "Blake performs the twelve numbers with characteristic daring. The Monk influence has grown refined over the decades. It began with a foregrounding of Monk's surprising dissonances and a widening of Monk's oddly placed silences. But unlike Monk, Blake brings a kind of European classical sensibility, both melodically and harmonically, to his improvisations" while Jerry D'Souza said "The pianist's thoughts are as fertile as one could ever wish them to be, and he makes fulsome use of them as he enunciates with authority on All That Is Tied, a solo recording made forty years after his first album. Time has not stilled his passion; it still beats strongly within him, along with his sense for discovery. Blake is always alert for a new direction which will spring a surprise. His sense of fun is an integral part of his makeup, and he continues to explore it delightfully". Not all reviews were as enthusiastic. The JazzTimes review by Thomas Conrad felt "a program of unrelieved, halting, gnarly Blake compositions makes for an austere evening... There is no pleasure in reporting that for me it is the longest 43 minutes of the jazz year to date".

== Track listing ==
All compositions by Ran Blake except as indicated

1. "All That Is Tied" (Jonah Kraut) - 4:55
2. "Breakthru" - 6:10
3. "Birmingham, U.S.A." - 3:23
4. "Thursday" - 2:58
5. "How 'Bout That" - 4:00
6. "Impresario of Death" - 3:39
7. "Sontagism" - 1:07
8. "Epilogue" - 3:41
9. "Latter Rain Christian Fellowship" - 2:09
10. "Field Cry" - 2:04
11. "Wende" - 4:15
12. "Breakthru" - 4:50

== Personnel ==
- Ran Blake - piano
