= Epistrophy =

Epistrophy may refer to:

- Epistrophy (composition), a jazz standard composed by Thelonious Monk and Kenny Clarke in 1941
- Epistrophy (Ran Blake album), a 1991 album by Ran Blake
- Epistrophy (Steve Lacy album), a 1969 album by Steve Lacy
- Epistrophy & Now's the Time, a 1972 live album by Richard Davis also known as Epistrophy
- Epistrophy (Charlie Rouse album), a 1988 album by Charlie Rouse

== See also ==
- Epistrophe, the repetition of the same word or words at the end of successive phrases, clauses or sentences
