= Short Life of Barbara Monk =

Studio album by Ran Blake
- Released: 1986
- Recorded: August 26, 1986
- Genre: Jazz
- Length: 41:33
- Label: Soul Note
- Producer: Giovanni Bonandrini

Ran Blake chronology
Painted Rhythms: The Compleat Ran Blake Volume II (1985)	Short Life of Barbara Monk (1986)	A Memory of Vienna (1988)

Short Life of Barbara Monk is a 1986 album by the American jazz pianist Ran Blake.

== Description ==
The album featured saxophonist Ricky Ford and was released on the Italian Soul Note label. The album's dedicatee (1953–84) died from cancer and was the daughter of the jazz pianist Thelonious Monk.

== Reception ==
The Penguin Guide to Jazz selected this album as part of its suggested Core Collection.

The Allmusic review by Scott Yanow awarded the album 3 stars stating "Tenor saxophonist Ricky Ford works surprisingly well with Blake, whose phrasing and use of space are unusual, while his interpretations are sometimes based on the feeling he gets from song titles rather than the chord changes... Another intriguing Ran Blake set".

Professional ratings
Review scores
Source	Rating
Penguin Guide to Jazz	4/4 stars
Allmusic	3/5 stars

== Track listing ==
All compositions by Ran Blake except where noted.

1. "I've Got You Under My Skin" (Cole Porter) - 3:37
2. "Una Matica de Ruda" [Take 1] (Traditional) - 0:54
3. "Artistry in Rhythm" (Stan Kenton) - 5:54
4. "Una Matica de Ruda" [Take 2] (Traditional) - 0:58
5. "In Between" (Claire Ritter) - 4:06
6. "Short Life of Barbara Monk" - 7:24
7. "Impresario of Death" - 3:45
8. "23 Degrees North, 82 Degrees West" (Dee Barton) - 2:44
9. "Dark" (Mauricio Villavecchia) - 4:49
10. "Vradiazi" (Mikis Theodorakis) - 2:51
11. "Pourquoi, Laurent?" - 4:31

- Recorded at Blue Jay Recording Studios in Carlisle, Massachusetts on August 26, 1986

== Personnel ==
- Ran Blake – piano
- Ricky Ford - tenor saxophone
- Ed Felson - bass
- Jon Hazilla - drums

== See also ==
- List of jazz albums
