= Lost Highway (Leon Payne song) =

1948 song by Leon Payne

Song by Leon Payne with Jack Rhodes' Lone Star Buddies
- A-side: "Baby Boy"
- Written: 1948
- Published: August 5, 1949 Acuff-Rose Publications, Inc.
- Released: October 1948
- Recorded: 1948
- Studio: Jim Beck Studio, Dallas, Texas
- Genre: Hillbilly
- Length: 2:44
- Label: Bullet 670
- Songwriter: Leon Payne

"Lost Highway"

Song by Hank Williams with His Drifting Cowboys
- A-side: "You're Gonna Change (Or I'm Gonna Leave)"
- Released: September 9, 1949
- Recorded: March 1, 1949
- Studio: Castle Studio at The Tulane Hotel, Nashville, TN
- Length: 2:40
- Label: MGM K10506
- Songwriter: Leon Payne
- Producer: Fred Rose

Hank Williams with His Drifting Cowboys singles chronology
"Mind Your Own Business" (1949)	"Lost Highway" (1949)	"My Bucket's Got a Hole in It" (1949)

"Lost Highway" is a country music song written and recorded by blind country singer-songwriter Leon Payne in 1948. It was released in October 1948 on Nashville-based Bullet label.

In the early days of Leon Payne's career, he used to travel from one place to another, trying to find jobs wherever he could. Once he was in California hitchhiking to Alba, Texas, to visit his sick mother, he was unable to get a ride and finally got help from The Salvation Army. He wrote "Lost Highway" on the edge of the road while waiting for a ride. Payne wrote hundreds of country songs in a prolific career that lasted from 1941 until his death in 1969. He is perhaps best known for his hits "I Love You Because", "You've Still Got a Place in My Heart", and for the two songs that Hank Williams recorded: "Lost Highway" and "They'll Never Take Her Love from Me". Payne released his version in October 1948.

== Hank Williams version ==
As Williams' biographer Colin Escott observes, "In recent years, 'Lost Highway' has been the title of several books, a stage show, a record label, and a television series. In 1997, director David Lynch used it as a film title. It's seen as one of Hank's defining records, if not a defining moment in country music, which makes it ironic that it barely dented the charts on release and doubly ironic that it's not even one of Hank's songs." Although he did not write the song, "Lost Highway" was a natural for Williams, the song's combination of perdition and hopelessness sounding "like pages torn from his diary." Williams recorded the song with Fred Rose producing and backing on the session from Dale Potter (fiddle), Don Davis (steel guitar), Zeb Turner (lead guitar), Clyde Baum (mandolin), Jack Shook (rhythm guitar), and probably Ernie Newton (bass).

Hank Williams Jr. refers to the song in his own song All My Rowdy Friends (Have Settled Down), with "I think I know what my father meant, when he sang about a lost highway".

== Covers ==
- Hank Williams performed the song on his 1949 album Lost Highway.
- Elton Britt performed the song on his 1960 album Beyond The Sunset.
- In 1965, Bob Dylan sang it with Joan Baez off-stage in a hotel room during 1965 British tour. It can be seen in the 1967 film Dont Look Back.
- Roy Acuff recorded a cover of this song as a single and released it as a 7-inch vinyl in 1966.
- Jimmy Martin and the Sunshine Boys did a version of the song on their 1966 release Good'N Country.
- Leon Russell recorded a cover of this song on his 1973 album "Hank Wilson's Back Vol. I"
- Jason & the Scorchers covered the song on their 1985 album Lost and Found.
- The Mekons did a cover of "Lost Highway" on their 1985 album Fear and Whiskey.
- U2 played the song several times on The Joshua Tree Tour in 1987 in disguise as their own support act, the Dalton Brothers
- David Allan Coe did a cover version of "Lost Highway" on his Ghost Of Hank Williams Album in 1997
- Chris Hillman and Herb Pedersen recorded the song on their 1996 album Bakersfield Bound.
- Therapy? performed the song as part of a BBC Evening Session on 4 August 1995 and it was later released on their 2007 compilation of live BBC performances, Music Through a Cheap Transistor.
- Coldplay covered the song 40 times early in their career, most recently in 2003
- Jeff Buckley played "Lost Highway" live in one of his concerts. It was released posthumously in 2004 on the re-release of his debut album Grace (Legacy edition)
- Bill Frisell included a live instrumental version on his 2005 live album Furthur East/Furthur West.
- Jerry Lee Lewis included the song (featuring Delaney Bramlett) on his 2006 album of covers, Last Man Standing
- In 2006, a live acoustic version was included on the 2006 Steve Goodman record Live at the Earl of Old Town.
- Tom Petty performed the song at rehearsal at CenterStaging, Burbank, CA, May 19, 2006, and included the recording on the 2007, 30 Year Anniversary DVD box set, "Running Down A Dream". DVD directed by Peter Bogdanovich.
- In 2008, World Idol Kurt Nilsen released a cover version on his album Rise to the Occasion. This version features Willie Nelson. The single reached No. 1 on Norway's VG-lista, the official Norwegian singles chart.
- In 2009, Willie Nelson recorded it yet again on his album Lost Highway with musician with Ray Price
- Ran Blake recorded an instrumental recomposed version on his 2009 album Driftwoods.
- In 2010, The Handsome Family included a version on their album Scattered.
- In 2013, The Replacements released a cover version on their EP Songs for Slim, a fundraiser for Slim Dunlap.
- A version filmed during a rehearsal appears in the Tom Petty documentary Runnin' Down a Dream.
- The first song played on every episode of the WMBR radio show Lost Highway is a rotating cover version of the eponymous song.
- Country music singer Johnny Horton recorded a version of the song in May 1959. In March 1960, he recorded another Payne composition, "They'll Never Take Her Love From Me."
- Townes Van Zandt performed a version.
- The Tallest Man on Earth recorded a version for his 2022 album of cover songs, Too Late for Edelweiss.
- Kacey Musgraves released a version in 2025 in honor of being signed to the revived record label of the same name.
- 2017 – John Greene, It Takes A Train To Cry

== Sources ==
- Escott, Colin; Merritt, George; MacEwen, William (2004). Hank Williams: The Biography. New York: Little, Brown.
