= Unmarked Van: A Tribute to Sarah Vaughan =

Studio album by Ran Blake
- Released: 1994
- Recorded: December 14, 15 and 17, 1994
- Genre: Jazz
- Length: 67:39
- Label: Soul Note

Ran Blake chronology
Masters From Different Worlds (1994)	Unmarked Van: A Tribute to Sarah Vaughan (1994)	A Memory of Vienna (1997)

Unmarked Van (Subtitled A Tribute to Sarah Vaughan) is an album of material associated with Sarah Vaughan by the American jazz pianist Ran Blake recorded in 1994 and released on the Italian Soul Note label.

== Reception ==
The Allmusic review by Scott Yanow awarded the album 4 stars stating "This is certainly an off-the-wall tribute... This moody and melancholy yet strangely celebratory set will stay in one's memory long after the CD has been played".

Professional ratings
Review scores
Source	Rating
Allmusic	4/5 stars
The Penguin Guide to Jazz Recordings	3.5/4 stars

== Track listing ==
All compositions by Ran Blake except as indicated

1. "Sarah" 3:02
2. "My Reverie" (Larry Clinton) - 3:45
3. "Sometimes I Feel Like a Motherless Child" (Traditional) - 2:57
4. "Tenderly" [Take 1] (Walter Gross, Jack Lawrence) - 3:01
5. "Make Yourself Comfortable" (Bob Merrill) - 2:23
6. "Tenderly" [Take 2] (Gross, Lawrence) - 1:51
7. "Solitary Sunday" - 3:02
8. "My Man's Gone Now" (George Gershwin, Ira Gershwin, DuBose Heyward) - 3:54
9. "Old Devil Moon" (E. Y. Harburg, Burton Lane) - 2:45
10. "A Portrait of Roy Haynes" - 2:34
11. "Whatever Lola Wants" (Richard Adler, Jerry Ross) - 2:27
12. "Wallflower Waltz" (Jack Segal, Marvin Fisher) - 2:19
13. "Tenderly" [Take 3] (Gross, Lawrence) - 3:10
14. "April" [Take 1] (Manny Kellem) - 2:38
15. "April" [Take 2] (Kellem) - 2:36
16. "Call Me" (Tony Hatch) - 2:16
17. "Moonlight on the Ganges" (Chester Wallace, Sherman Myers - 3:09
18. "The Girl from Ipanema" (Antonio Carlos Jobim, Vinicius de Moraes, Norman Gimbel) - 3:56
19. "Stompin' at the Savoy" (Edgar Sampson) - 3:38
20. "A Little Tear" (Eumir Deodato) - 2:57
21. "Septembre" - 2:53
22. "The Unmarked Van" - 4:20
23. "Tenderly" [Take 4] (Gross, Lawrence) - 3:00

- Recorded at Murec Studio in Milano, Italy on December 14, 15 and 17, 1994

== Personnel ==
- Ran Blake – piano
- Tiziano Tononi - drums
