= The Blue Potato and Other Outrages... =

Studio album by Ran Blake
- Released: 1969
- Recorded: April 9 & 10, 1969; Stereo Sound Studios, New York City
- Genre: Jazz
- Length: 39:14
- Label: Milestone; MSP 9021
- Producer: Orrin Keepnews

Ran Blake chronology
Ran Blake Plays Solo Piano (1966)	The Blue Potato and Other Outrages... (1969)	Breakthru (1976)

The Blue Potato and Other Outrages... is an album of solo piano performances by the American jazz pianist Ran Blake recorded in 1969 and released on the Milestone label.

== Reception ==
Professional ratings
Review scores
Source	Rating
AllMusic	4/5 stars

Scott Yanow in his review for AllMusic stated, "A very emotional improviser (whose unexpected explosions of sound sometimes punctuate otherwise introspective performances), Blake is a true original. This Milestone LP, only his third recording in eight years, shows Ran Blake really finding unusual things to say on a variety of standards... On this solo piano date, Blake makes political (if nonverbal) statements on many of these pieces, improvising off of the titles rather than the chord changes".

== Track listing ==
All compositions by Ran Blake except as indicated

1. "God Bless the Child" (Billie Holiday, Arthur Herzog, Jr.) - 3:47
2. "Three Seeds (A Suite): Regis Debray/Che Guevara/Malcolm X" - 7:27
3. "The Blue Potato" - 2:36
4. "All or Nothing at All" (Arthur Altman, Jack Lawrence) - 4:25
5. "Fables of Faubus" (Charles Mingus) - 3:27
6. "Chicago" (Fred Fisher) - 3:45
7. "Never On Sunday" (Manos Hadjidakis) - 2:49
8. "Soul On Ice" - 3:08
9. "Vradiazi" - 3:17
10. "Garvey`s Ghost" - 2:16
11. "Bella Ciao" - 2:27
12. "Stars Fell on Alabama" (Frank Perkins, Mitchell Parish) - 2:18

== Personnel ==
- Ran Blake – piano
