= Suffield Gothic =

Studio album by Ran Blake
- Released: 1983
- Recorded: September 28 & 29, 1983
- Genre: Jazz
- Length: 42:16
- Label: Soul Note
- Producer: Giovanni Bonandrini

Ran Blake chronology
Duke Dreams (1981)	Suffield Gothic (1983)	Vertigo (1985)

Suffield Gothic is an album by the American jazz pianist Ran Blake featuring saxophonist Houston Person. It was recorded in 1983 and released on the Italian Soul Note label.

== Reception ==
The Allmusic review by Scott Yanow awarded the album 2½ stars, stating "No Ran Blake record is ever dull".

Professional ratings
Review scores
Source	Rating
Allmusic	2.5/5 stars
The Penguin Guide to Jazz Recordings	3/4 stars

== Track listing ==
All compositions by Ran Blake except as indicated

1. "Curtis" - 3:39
2. "Pete Kelly's Blues" (Sammy Cahn, Ray Heindorf) - 2:49
3. "There's Been a Change in My Life" (Hubert Powell) - 4:04
4. "Vanguard" - 4:47
5. "Ol' Man River" (Oscar Hammerstein II, Jerome Kern) - 5:23
6. "Tribute to Mahalia: Walk over God's Heaven/It Don't Cost Very Much" (Thomas A. Dorsey/Traditional) - 6:27
7. "Indian Winter" - 5:57
8. "The Stars and Stripes Forever" (John Philip Sousa) - 3:47
9. "Midnight Local to Tate County" - 5:56

- Recorded at Vanguard Studios in New York City on September 28 & 29, 1983

== Personnel ==
- Ran Blake – piano
- Houston Person – tenor saxophone (tracks 1, 5, 7 & 9)
