= Duke Dreams =

Studio album by Ran Blake
- Released: 1981
- Recorded: May 27 and June 2, 1981; Barigozzi Studio in Milano, Italy
- Genre: Jazz
- Length: 39:14
- Label: Soul Note
- Producer: Giovanni Bonandrini

Ran Blake chronology
Improvisations (1981)	Duke Dreams (1981)	Suffield Gothic (1984)

Duke Dreams (subtitled The Legacy of Strayhorn-Ellington) is an album of solo piano performances of material written by or associated with Duke Ellington by the American jazz pianist Ran Blake recorded in 1981 and released on the Italian Soul Note label.

== Reception ==
The Allmusic review by Scott Yanow awarded the album 4½ stars stating "While hinting at Duke's piano style, Ran Blake often reharmonizes and greatly reinvents his music... Highly recommended".

Professional ratings
Review scores
Source	Rating
Allmusic	4.5/5 stars
The Penguin Guide to Jazz	3/4 stars

== Track listing ==
All compositions by Duke Ellington except as indicated

1. "Duke Dreams" (Ran Blake) - 2:58
2. "Something to Live For" (Ellington, Billy Strayhorn) - 5:42
3. "Me and You" [Take 1] - 2:20
4. "Drop Me Off in Harlem" - 2:04
5. "Duke" (Dave Brubeck) - 3:45
6. "Blue Rose" - 2:49
7. "It Don't Mean a Thing (If It Ain't Got That Swing)" - 2:52
8. "Black and Tan Fantasy" (Ellington, Bubber Miley) - 5:15
9. "Animal Crackers" (Sam Coslow, Harry Link, Fred Rich) - 1:26
10. "Me and You" [Take 2] - 1:58
11. "Sophisticated Lady" (Ellington, Mills) - 2:27
12. "Take the "A" Train" (Strayhorn) - 5:38

== Personnel ==
- Ran Blake – piano
