= Four Compositions (Solo, Duo & Trio) 1982/1988 =

Studio album by Anthony Braxton
- Released: 1989
- Recorded: April 6, 1982 and November 18–19, 1988
- Genre: Jazz
- Length: 68:29
- Label: hatART 6019
- Producers: Pia Uehlinger, Werner X. Uehlinger

Anthony Braxton chronology
2 Compositions (Järvenpää) 1988 (1988)	Four Compositions (Solo, Duo & Trio) 1982/1988 (1989)	A Memory of Vienna (1988)

Four Compositions (Solo, Duo & Trio) 1982/1988 (also issued as Compositions 99, 101, 107 & 139) is an album by American composer and saxophonist Anthony Braxton recorded in 1982 and 1988 and released on the hatART label in 1989.

== Reception ==
The AllMusic review by Brian Olewnick awarded the album 4 stars stating "Overall, this is one of the better recorded examples of the non-jazz area of Braxton's sound-world and is highly recommended to adventurous listeners".

Professional ratings
Review scores
Source	Rating
AllMusic	4/5 stars

== Track listing ==
All compositions by Anthony Braxton.

1. "Composition 101" – 16:59
2. "Composition 139" – 12:35
3. "Composition 99b [+97C, 117E, 117H, 118H]" – 7:45
4. "Composition 107: A" – 4:23
5. "Composition 107: B" – 5:02
6. "Composition 107: C" – 9:08
7. "Composition 107: D" – 7:32
8. "Composition 107: E" – 5:05
- Recorded at Tonstudio Bauer in Ludwigsburg, West Germany on April 6, 1982 (tacks 4–8) and at Haus der Begegnung Mariahilf in Vienna, Austra on November 18, 1988 (tracks 1 & 3) and November 19, 1988 (track 2)

== Personnel ==
- Anthony Braxton – sopranino saxophone, Soprano saxophone, alto saxophone (tracks 1, & 3–8)
- Marianne Schroeder – piano (tracks 1, 2 & 4–8)
- Garrett List – trombone (tracks 4–8)
