= Painted Rhythms: The Compleat Ran Blake, Volume 1 =

Recording by Ran Blake
- Recorded: December 1985
- Venue: Houghton Chapel, Wellesley College, Wellesley, Massachusetts; North Shore Music Theatre, Beverly, Massachusetts
- Genre: Jazz
- Label: GM
- Producer: Gunther Schuller

Painted Rhythms: The Compleat Ran Blake, Volume 1 is a solo piano album by Ran Blake. It was recorded in 1985 and released by GM Recordings.

== Recording and music ==
The album of solo piano performances by Ran Blake was recorded in December 1985 at Houghton Chapel, Wellesley College, in Wellesley, Massachusetts, and at the North Shore Music Theatre in Beverly, Massachusetts. It was produced by Gunther Schuller. The material is standards, except for Blake's "Impresario of Death". Three interpretations of "Maple Leaf Rag" are presented; a fourth is on Painted Rhythms: The Compleat Ran Blake, Volume 2.

== Releases and reception ==
Professional ratings
Review scores
Source	Rating
AllMusic	4/5 stars
The Penguin Guide to Jazz	4/4 stars

Painted Rhythms: The Compleat Ran Blake, Volume 1 was released by GM Recordings. The AllMusic reviewer concluded that it was "Highly recommended, as are most of Ran Blake's unique recordings."

== Track listing ==
1. "Azure" (Duke Ellington) – 3:02
2. "Skrontch" (Ellington) – 2:34
3. "Drop Me Off in Harlem" (Ellington) – 1:45
4. "What's Your Story, Morning Glory?" (Mary Lou Williams, Paul Francis Webster, Jack Lawrence) – 2:40
5. "Ezzthetic" (George Russell) – 3:51
6. "Interlude" (Pete Rugolo, Russell) – 5:00
7. "Painted Rhythm" (Stan Kenton) – 1:19
8. "Who" (Jerome Kern, Oscar Hammerstein II, Otto Harbach) – 2:30
9. "Smoke Gets in Your Eyes" (Kern, Harbach) – 5:53
10. "Impresario of Death" (Ran Blake) – 3:39
11. "Moonlight on the Ganges" (Sherman Myers, Chester Wallace) – 2:24
12. "Hallelujah, I Love Her So" (Ray Charles) – 1:40
13. "Maple Leaf Rag" (Scott Joplin) – 3:12
14. "Maple Leaf Rag" (Joplin) – 3:21
15. "Maple Leaf Rag" (Joplin) – 2:07

== Personnel ==
- Ran Blake – piano
