= 2 Compositions (Järvenpää) 1988 =

Live album by Anthony Braxton, Ensemble Braxtonia
- Released: 1996
- Recorded: November 7, 1988
- Venues: Järvenpää Hall, Järvenpää, Finland
- Genre: Jazz
- Length: 70:21
- Labels: Leo; CD LR 233
- Producers: Jukka Wasama and Leo Feigin

Anthony Braxton chronology
Ensemble (Victoriaville) 1988 (1988)	2 Compositions (Järvenpää) 1988 (1996)	Four Compositions (Solo, Duo & Trio) 1982/1988 (1989)

2 Compositions (Järvenpää) 1988 is a live album by composer and saxophonist Anthony Braxton recorded in Finland in 1988 and first released on the Leo label on CD in 1996.

== Reception ==
Professional ratings
Review scores
Source	Rating
Allmusic	4/5 stars
The Penguin Guide to Jazz Recordings	3.5/4 stars

The Allmusic review by Chris Kelsey stated "Recorded with a septet of Finnish musicians that manifests a pronounced affinity for his music, Braxton's Compositions No. 144 and 145 are given a vigorous, warm, and reasonably tight rendering, of a sort made difficult by the usual lack of rehearsal time and scarcity of appropriate collaborators. The soloists, including and especially the leader, are uniformly excellent, but most importantly, the written parts are realized in a way that does justice to the concept".

== Track listing ==
1. "Composition N. 144 / Composition N. 145" (Anthony Braxton) - 70:21

== Personnel ==
- Anthony Braxton- flute, sopranino saxophone, soprano saxophone, alto saxophone
- Mircea Stan - trombone
- Pentti Lahti - flute, soprano saxophone, alto saxophone
- Pepa Päivinen - flute, tenor saxophone, soprano saxophone, bass clarinet
- Seppo Baron Paakkunainen - flute, tenor saxophone, baritone saxophone
- Mikko-Ville Luolajan-Mikkola - violin
- Teppo Hauta-aho - bass, cello
- Jukka Wasama - drums
