= When the Wind Was Cool =

Studio album by Dominique Eade
- Released: 1997
- Genre: Jazz
- Label: RCA

Dominique Eade chronology
The Sky Has Melted Away (1995)	When the Wind Was Cool (1997)	The Long Way Home (1999)

When the Wind Was Cool is the fourth album by American jazz singer and composer Dominique Eade. It was released in 1997 by RCA Records, her first on a major record label, and was produced by Ben Sidran.

== Critical reception ==
Professional ratings
Review scores
Source	Rating
AllMusic	4/5 stars

Billboard praised the album, stating that Eade was "engaging" and the album's material "fits perfectly". Scott Yanow, writing for AllMusic, recommended the album, stating that "Eade's voice captures the essence of those cool-toned singers, yet she also sounds fairly distinctive." and "the appealing singer herself wrote half of the arrangements" Richard S. Ginell of Variety called the album "just another trendy, respectful 'tribute' album, albeit with the heretofore untried concept of a June Christy/Chris Connor salute.

Music critic Bob Blumenthal praised the album, writing in The Atlantic that When the Wind Was Cool was "a bold and atmospheric tribute to June Christy and Chris Connor" and "Eade's rich voice, her effortless delivery, and the tasteful assurance with which she embellishes melodies make her sound totally at home with the vintage repertoire of Chris-ty and Connor." The Austin Chronicle called it Eade's "career-best" and "a swinging tribute to Connor and Christy".
