= Driftwoods =

Studio album by Ran Blake
- Released: January 27, 2009
- Recorded: 2008
- Genre: Jazz
- Label: Tompkins Square TSQ2097
- Producer: Jonah Kraut

Ran Blake chronology
All That Is Tied (2006)	Driftwoods (2009)	Out of the Shadows (2010)

Driftwoods is a solo album by pianist Ran Blake recorded in 2008 and released on the Tompkins Square label in 2009.

== Reception ==
Professional ratings
Review scores
Source	Rating
Allmusic	4/5 stars
All About Jazz	4/5 stars
PopMatters	8/10 stars

The Allmusic review by Thom Jurek awarded the album 4 stars stating "Blake's sense of restraint, even in the most deliberate of his improvised readings such as on Lewis Allan's "Strange Fruit," Quincy Jones' theme from The Pawnbroker, Milton Nascimento's "Cançao do Sol," and even Gershwin's "I Loves You, Porgy," offers such distinctive readings of these tunes rhythmically, harmonically, and lyrically that it's difficult after a while to see where the body of the original composition ends and Blake begins".

On All About Jazz Henry Smith noted "Blake's noir-like approach to the piano, with his open sense of harmony and time as well as the deep and beautiful melancholy which ingrains his playing, is present on all of the pieces here. Never once does a cliche emerge from his fingers as he infuses these works with a personal and carefully chosen character all his own".

PopMatters reviewer Steve Horowitz said "On the whole, the album is soft and lovely and begs to be heard when one seeks the quiet of solitude"

The JazzTimes review by Thomas Conrad felt "If you have read about Ran Blake but do not know his music, Driftwoods is a good place to discover him".

== Track listing ==
1. "Driftwood" (Tommy Goodman (music), Peter Udell (lyrics)) - 4:24
2. "Dancing in the Dark 2" (Howard Dietz, Arthur Schwartz) - 4:19
3. "Dancing in the Dark 1" (Dietz, Schwartz) - 2:24
4. "Lost Highway" (Leon Payne) - 2:03
5. "Unforgettable" (Irving Gordon) - 2:57
6. "Cançao do Sol" (Milton Nascimento) - 3:38
7. "No More" (Toots Camarata, Bob Russell) - 3:08
8. "I Loves You, Porgy" (George Gershwin, Ira Gershwin) - 3:52
9. "Strange Fruit" (Lewis Allan) - 2:16
10. "Pawnbroker" (Quincy Jones) - 2:51
11. "There's Been a Change" (Hubert Powell) - 2:23
12. "Portrait" (Charles Mingus) - 3:01
13. "I'm Going to Tell God" (W.A. McKinney) - 3:02
14. "You Are My Sunshine" (Jimmie Davis, Charles Mitchell) - 1:23

== Personnel ==
- Ran Blake - piano
