= Ensemble (Victoriaville) 1988 =

Live album by Anthony Braxton
- Released: 1992
- Recorded: October 8, 1988
- Genre: Jazz
- Length: 49:10
- Label: Victo

Anthony Braxton chronology
The Aggregate (1988)	Ensemble (Victoriaville) 1988 (1992)	2 Compositions (Järvenpää) 1988 (1988)

Ensemble (Victoriaville) 1988 is a live album by American composer and saxophonist Anthony Braxton recorded in 1988 and released on the Victo label.

== Reception ==
The Allmusic review by Stephen Cook awarded the album 4½ stars calling it "A top-notch Braxton release".

Professional ratings
Review scores
Source	Rating
Allmusic	4.5/5 stars
The Penguin Guide to Jazz Recordings	3/4 stars

== Track listing ==
All compositions by Anthony Braxton

1. "Composition No 141 (+20 + 96+120d)" - 40:46
2. "Composition No 142" - 8:24
- Recorded at the Festival International De Musique Actuelle in Victoriaville, Quebec (Canada) on October 8, 1988

== Personnel ==
- Anthony Braxton - sopranino saxophone, soprano saxophone, alto saxophone
- Paul Smoker - trumpet
- George Lewis - trombone
- Evan Parker - tenor saxophone
- Bobby Naughton - vibraphone
- Joëlle Léandre - bass
- Gerry Hemingway - percussion
