= Claire Ritter =

American jazz musician

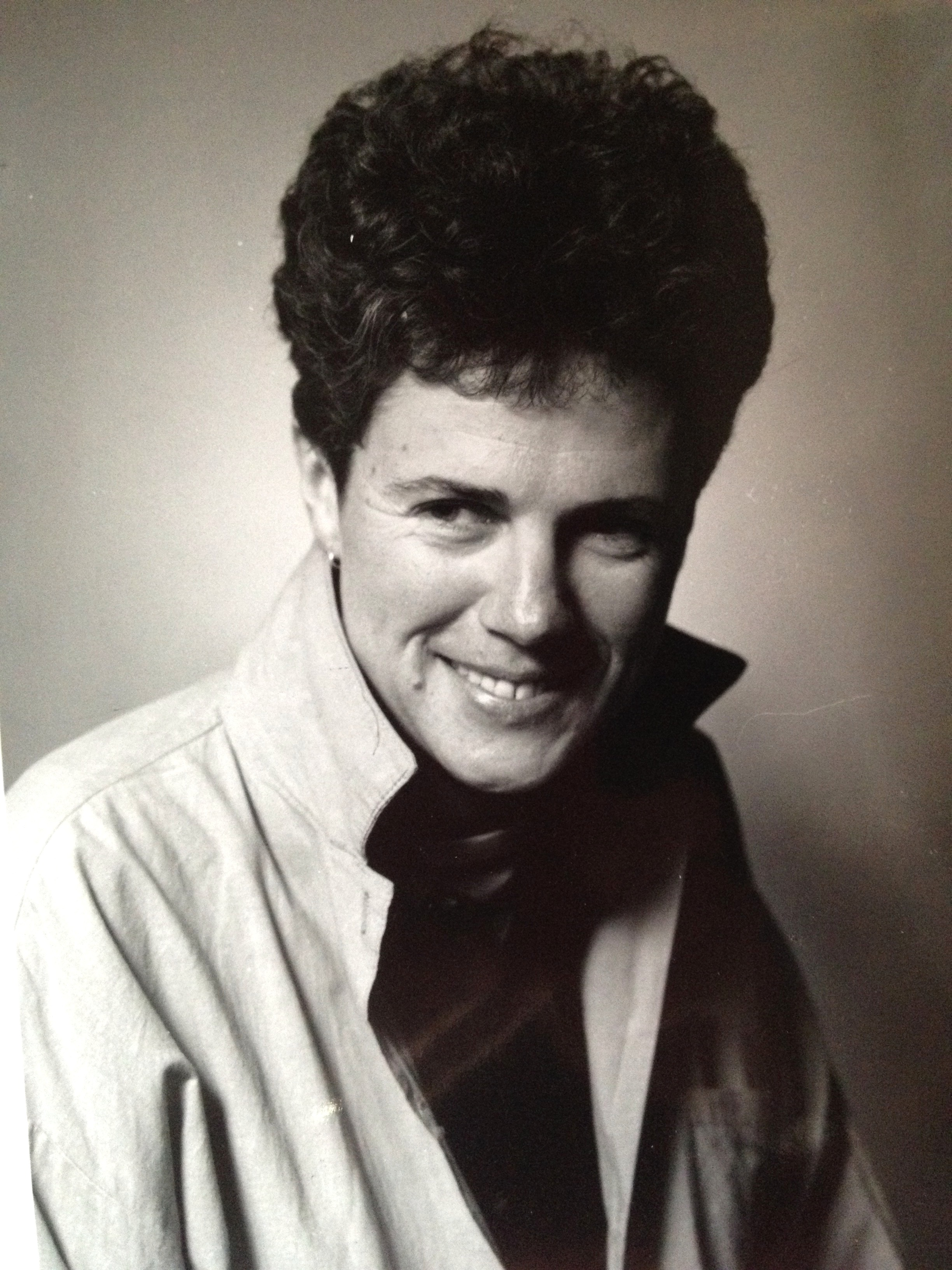
- Claire Ritter in Boston, 1990
- Born: May 31, 1952 (age 74); Charlotte, North Carolina
- Style: Jazz, classical, new music
- Awards: North Carolina Arts Council Jazz Composer Fellowship; 2000
- Website: www.claireritter.com

Claire Ritter (born May 31, 1952, Charlotte, North Carolina) is an American composer and pianist working in a style that fuses jazz with classical, new music, and occasionally other world music cultures.

== Early life and study ==
Ritter grew up on a horse farm in rural Weddington, North Carolina, and began piano lessons in the public school system at the age of seven. As a teenager, she studied with jazz pianist-arranger Ziggy Hurwitz. In 1974, she received a B.S. in Education from Appalachian State University, where she was also an amateur athlete, competing in tennis, softball, soccer, field hockey, and basketball. She returned to Charlotte, where she attended Queens College and studied classical piano with Anita Bultman Tritt, principal pianist with the Charlotte Symphony, earning a B.A. in music in 1978. From 1978 to 1980, Ritter studied privately with jazz pianist Mary Lou Williams, when she was an artist in residence at Duke University.

In 1981, Ritter moved to Boston, Massachusetts, to study with pianist Ran Blake and attend New England Conservatory. She lived in Boston for 16 years, during which time her compositions were performed and recorded with artists such as Steve Swallow, Ricky Ford, and Dave Holland, and Boston-area musicians such as Dominique Eade, Ran Blake, and Stan Strickland. In 1996, she served on the faculty of the New England Conservatory Contemporary Improvisation Department and taught Contemporary Songwriting. Her composition, "In Between", was recorded in 1986 by Ran Blake on The Short Life of Barbara Monk and by Franz Koglmann on Orte Der Geometrie in 1989. Claire Ritter's composition has been performed globally in the US, Canada, Europe, and Asia, including the Thelonious Monk Jazz Institute Festival, American Women Composers, Brandeis University, Ottawa Jazz Festival, Josef Matthias Haur Konservatorium, Otterreichischen Museum, Multicultural Arts Center in Boston, Charlotte New Music Festival, Carolina Jazz Composers Festival at Queens University, among others.

== Style and reviews ==
All About Jazz describes Ritter as "an undersung jazz master" and praised her composing and improvising for their economy, "with every new idea coming at you quickly, every tight, engaging melody buffed up like a little jewel". Her approach to the keyboard has been described as painterly, with Ritter "applying splashes of color, dabs of contrast and subtly adjusting tempo and dynamics to create masterful soundscapes". Her compositions are notable for their "haunting clarity", and are often compared to songs without lyrics. Her ability to orchestrate compositions, using instrumental combinations that recall classical music, places jazz elements such as the blues and improvisation in novel contexts.

Beginning with her 2001 recording, "Castles in the Air", Ritter expanded her work into the classical avant-garde world with the debut of Opus 17, New Southern Symphonic Suite for Modern Dance, described by the Boston Globe as "intriguing, adventurous explorations". In 2004, her recording Greener and Blue, also incorporated non-Western instruments and folk music elements into her composing. In 2007, AllMusic describes her album, Waltzing the Splendor, which was inspired by painter Georgia O'Keeffe's "Orange and Red Streak", as "musically painting broad strokes of bright color, based in nature like O'Keeffe". Ritter's latest 2015 CD release, Soho Solo, a solo piano recording, received 4–5 star reviews and is described as "unfailingly beautiful". Her pianist approach continues to be inspired by the work of Mary Lou Williams, Ran Blake, and Thelonious Monk, noted recently in the liner notes of Soho Solo, as "direct and succinct, like the North Carolina pianist-composer Thelonious Monk's style".

In 2017-2019, Claire Ritter collaborated in a newly-forged partnership with innovative pianist Ran Blake - a piano duo and live recorded performance of mainly original composition at Queens University of Charlotte. This "riveting duo performance", resulted in the newest CD recording "Eclipse Orange", which was also praised as "The Best Jazz of 2019". "Eclipse Orange", "an unusual and remarkable album", has received continued accolades including 4-5 star review in All About Jazz.

Future projects, beginning in 2020, include the writing of a jazz method book composed of original jazz motifs by Claire Ritter - supported by Ritter's 5th North Carolina Regional Artist Grant,.

== Grants and awards ==
In 1998, Ritter moved back to North Carolina, where she teaches composition to private students, and continues to compose, perform, and record. Since returning to the Charlotte area, she has been awarded the North Carolina Arts Council Jazz Composer Fellowship in 2000, as well as multiple Arts & Science Council (ASC) Regional Artist Grants. Claire Ritter's recent artistic projects have been funded by a 2015, 2017, and 2019 ASC grant to perform original works in collaboration with abstract photography at Central Piedmont Community College and Queens University of Charlotte.; as well as collaborate with legend pianist Ran Blake at Queens University, and write a jazz method book.

== Discography ==
In 1987, Ritter founded Zoning Recordings, named after a major work by her former teacher, Mary Lou Williams. She has released the following CDs on the label:

- In Between, Claire Ritter with Ran Blake, Dave Holland, and Dominique Eade (1988)
- Ain’t Life a Circus, Claire Ritter with Christine Correa, Stan Strickland (1991)
- Mistral, by vocalist Eleni Odoni, with Ran Blake, Claire Ritter (1991)
- At One, Claire Ritter with Takaaki Masuko, Richie Stearns (1994)
- True, Claire Ritter with Takaaki Masuko and Kaku Sato (1998)
- Castles in the Air, Claire Ritter with Steve Swallow, Stan Strickland, and Takaaki Masuko (2001)
- River of Joy: Solo Portraits, Claire Ritter with Steve Swallow and Ran Blake (2001)
- Greener than Blue, Claire Ritter with Stan Strickland, Todd Low, and Bob Weiner (2005); includes Op. 21
- Waltzing the Splendor, with Jon Metzger, Jane Hart Brendle, Ashima Scripp, and Dave Holland (2007)
- The Stream of Pearls Project (inspired by water), Claire Ritter with Ashima Scripp, Richie Stearns, Toni Naples, Rick Hansen, Jon Metzger, and Takaaki Masuko (2011)
- Claire Ritter & Friends - Zoning Recordings (DVD-ZR1011) - live at the Multicultural Arts Center in Cambridge MA, Claire Ritter with Dominique Eade, Stan Strickland, Takaaki Masuko (2012)
- Soho Solo, Claire Ritter solo piano recording (2015)
- Eclipse Orange - Claire Ritter & Ran Blake, with Kent O'Doherty (2019)

=== Recordings by others ===
- Short Life of Barbara Monk/Ran Blake with Ricky Ford, Jon Hazilla (1988 - Soul Note Records 1127)
- Orte Der Geometrie/Franz Koglmann with Ran Blake (1989 - HatArt 6018)
- Streaming Documentary DVD (1991 - New England Conservatory of Music in Boston)
- Southern Arts Federation (1992 - The Music and thoughts of Claire Ritter: SAF#3)
- Traces (2002 - JAZZIZ JZD0202)
