= Epistrophy (Ran Blake album) =

Studio album by Ran Blake
- Released: 1991
- Recorded: April 19 & 20, 1991
- Genre: Jazz
- Length: 54:20
- Label: Soul Note
- Producer: Giovanni Bonandrini

Ran Blake chronology
That Certain Feeling (1991)	Epistrophy (1991)	Roundabout (1994)

Epistrophy is an album of solo piano performances of material written by, or associated with, Thelonious Monk by the American jazz pianist Ran Blake recorded in 1991 and released on the Italian Soul Note label.

== Reception ==
The Allmusic review by Scott Yanow awarded the album 3 stars stating "Ran Blake's re-interpretations of 12 Thelonious Monk songs and four standards that Monk enjoyed playing are quite different than everyone else's".

Professional ratings
Review scores
Source	Rating
Allmusic	3/5 stars
The Penguin Guide to Jazz	3.5/4 stars

== Track listing ==
All compositions by Thelonious Monk except as indicated

1. "Epistrophy" (Kenny Clarke, Monk) - 3:08
2. "Thelonious" - 5:18
3. "April in Paris" (Vernon Duke, E. Y. Harburg) - 3:06
4. "Off Minor" - 1:39
5. "Criss-Cross" - 2:18
6. "Reflections" - 3:43
7. "Epistrophy" (Clarke, Monk) - 3:36
8. "'Round Midnight" - 5:50
9. "Hornin' In" - 0:56
10. "Just a Gigolo" (Julius Brammer, Leonello Casucci) - 3:10
11. "Nice Work If You Can Get It (George Gershwin, Ira Gershwin) - 3:46
12. "Ruby, My Dear" - 2:59
13. "Monk's Mood" - 5:12
14. "Smoke Gets in Your Eyes" (Otto Harbach, Jerome Kern) - 2:47
15. "Eronel" - 2:27
16. "Misterioso" - 3:08
17. "Epistrophy" (Clarke, Monk) - 1:17
  - Recorded at Barigozzi Studio in Milano, Italy on April 19 & 20, 1991

== Personnel ==
- Ran Blake – piano
