= Christine Correa =

American jazz singer of Indian origin

- Born: Christine Isobel Correa; July 8, 1955 (age 71); Mumbai, India
- Genre: Jazz
- Occupation: Musician
- Years active: 1990s–present
- Label: Music & Arts
- Website: christinecorrea.com

Christine Isobel Correa (born July 8, 1955) is an American jazz singer of Indian origin.

== Life and work ==
Correa is from a musical family; her father Micky Correa led big bands in India. As a child she sang and played piano. In 1979, she moved to the U.S. and attended the New England Conservatory of Music, where her teachers included Jaki Byard, Ran Blake, and Joe Maneri. She worked with the quintet of Frank Carlberg, in ballet music for the Battery Dance Company. She teaches at Columbia University and is the director the Maine Jazz Camp.

== Discography ==
With Ran Blake

- Round About (Music & Arts, 1994)
- Out of the Shadows (Red Piano, 2010)
- Down Here Below: Tribute to Abbey Lincoln Volume One (Red Piano, 2012)
- The Road Keeps Winding: Tribute to Abbey Lincoln Volume Two (Red Piano, 2015)
- Streaming (Red Piano, 2018)
- When Soft Rains Fall (Red Piano, 2021)

With Frank Carlberg

- Ugly Beauty (Northeastern, 1993)
- The Crazy Woman (Accurate, 1995)
- Variations On A Summer Day (Fresh Sound New Talent, 1999)
- In The Land Of Art (Fresh Sound New Talent, 2002)
- State of The Union (Fresh Sound New Talent, 2005)
- The American Dream (Red Piano, 2007)
- Uncivilized Ruminations (Red Piano, 2009)
- Big Enigmas (Red Piano, 2012)
- Word Circus (Red Piano, 2014)
- No Money In Art (Red Piano, 2016)
