= Wende (album) =

Studio album by Ran Blake
- Recorded: 1976
- Studio: Boston
- Genre: Jazz
- Label: Owl

Wende is a solo piano album by Ran Blake. It was recorded in 1976 and released by Owl Records.

== Recording and music ==
The album of solo piano performances by Ran Blake was recorded in Boston in 1976. All of the pieces are Blake compositions.

== Releases and reception ==
Professional ratings
Review scores
Source	Rating
AllMusic	3.5/5 stars
DownBeat	4/5 stars

Wende was released by Owl Records. It was later issued on CD in the early 1990s, and then reissued by Sunnyside Records on March 13, 2007.

The AllMusic reviewer concluded that "Wende is a beautifully tender album, full of memory, longing, sadness, and joy, by a pianist whose middle name should be 'Ghost'." DownBeat wrote that "Blake is practically a minimalist, distilling ideas to their essence and whispering truths some other pianists would shout."

== Track listing ==
1. "Field Cry"
2. "Wende"
3. "Thursday"
4. "Aftermath"
5. "Three Personalities"
6. "East Wind"
7. "How 'bout That"
8. "Jim Crow"
9. "Arline"
10. "Blues for Wheatleigh"
11. "Silver Fox"
12. "Jinxey's"
13. "How 'bout That"

== Personnel ==
- Ran Blake – piano
