= A Memory of Vienna =

Studio album by Ran Blake and Anthony Braxton
- Released: 1997
- Recorded: November 19, 1988
- Venues: Haus der Begegnung Mariahilf in Vienna, Austria
- Genre: Jazz
- Length: 55:33
- Label: hatOLOGY 505
- Producers: Art Lange, Pia Uehlinger and Werner X. Uehlinger

Anthony Braxton chronology
Four Compositions (Solo, Duo & Trio) 1982/1988 (1989)	A Memory of Vienna (1997)	Kol Nidre (1988)

Ran Blake chronology
Short Life of Barbara Monk (1986)	A Memory of Vienna (1988)	You Stepped Out of a Cloud (1989)

A Memory of Vienna is an album by pianist Ran Blake and saxophonist Anthony Braxton performing jazz standards recorded in 1988 and released on the hatOLOGY label in 1997.

== Reception ==
Professional ratings
Review scores
Source	Rating
Allmusic	4/5 stars
All About Jazz	4/5 stars
The Penguin Guide to Jazz Recordings	3/4 stars

The Allmusic review by Thom Jurek stated "This pair, despite the quirky nature of Blake's off-kilter harmonizing (which is very lyrical), know how to swing together, taking great care not to get in the way of the tunes they're playing. This is as understated and "mellow" as you will ever hear these two players. However, it also may be the first time you hear what sensitive listeners and interpretive masters they can be with the jazz canon". On All About Jazz Troy Collins noted "Though admired for their uncompromising, avant-garde innovations, the most surprising aspect of the session is not the duo's relative lack of cacophonous pyrotechnics, but the incredible level of intuitive empathy and conceptual foresight displayed—despite the ad hoc nature of the recording. A Memory Of Vienna demonstrates Blake and Braxton's longstanding reverence for standard material, bringing new life to timeless classics with understated creativity and soulful conviction".

== Track listing ==
1. "'Round Midnight" (Thelonious Monk, Cootie Williams, Bernie Hanighen) - 11:06
2. "Yardbird Suite" (Charlie Parker) - 5:37
3. "You Go to My Head" (J. Fred Coots, Haven Gillespie) - 7:57
4. "Just Friends" (John Klenner, Sam M. Lewis) - 6:24
5. "Alone Together" (Arthur Schwartz, Howard Dietz) - 4:58
6. "Four" (Miles Davis) - 4:52
7. "Soul Eyes" (Mal Waldron) - 7:33
8. "I'm Getting Sentimental Over You" (George Bassman, Ned Washington) - 7:06

== Personnel ==
- Anthony Braxton - alto saxophone
- Ran Blake - piano
