= Ronnie Wells =

American jazz musician

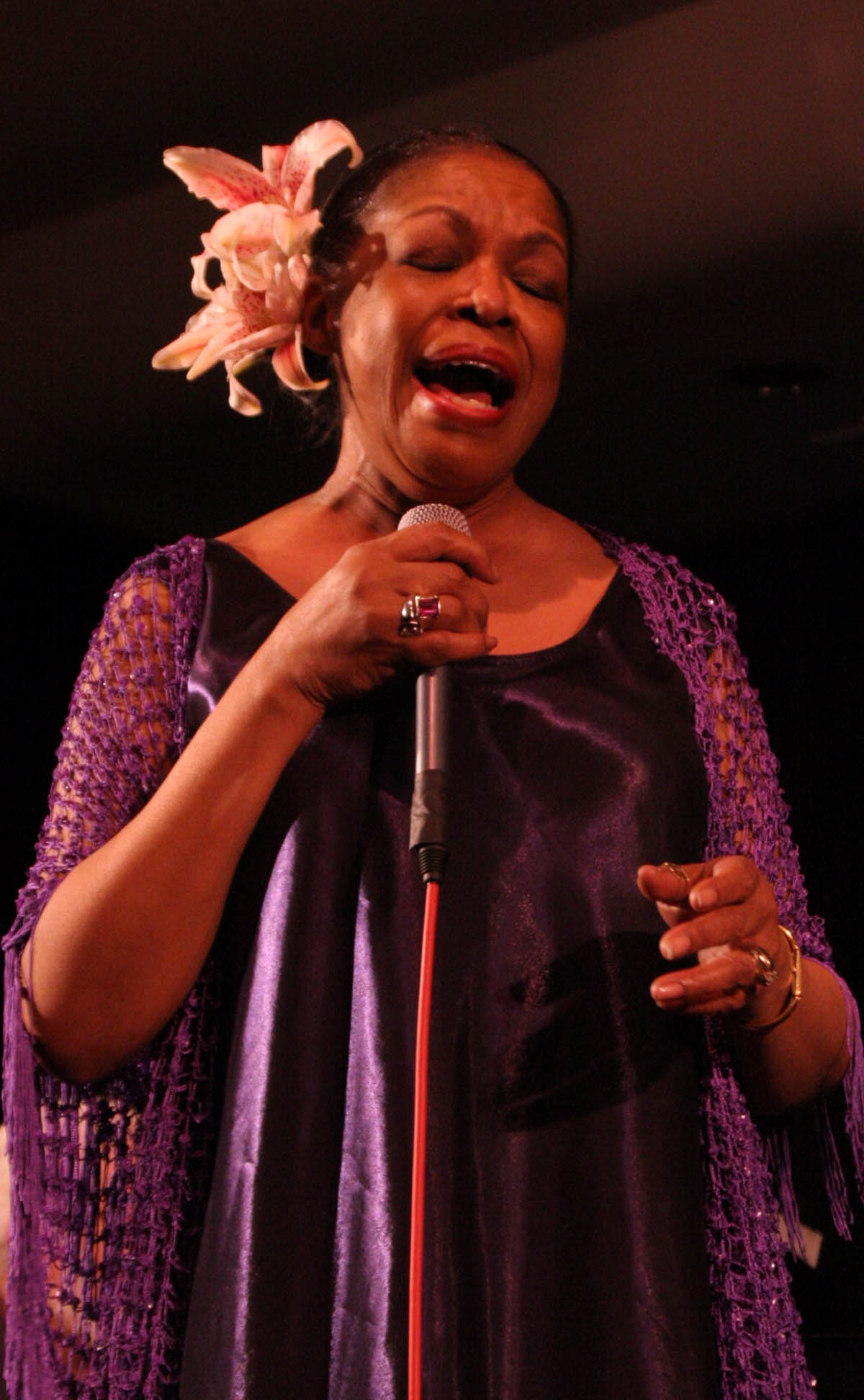
Ronnie2

Ronnie Wells (February 28, 1943 – March 7, 2007) was a jazz singer and educator in the Washington area for more than three decades. She shared the stage with musicians such as Billy Eckstine, Lonnie Liston Smith, Jimmy Witherspoon and Oscar Brown. Wells was founder of the Fish Middleton Jazz Studies Scholarship and co-founded the East Coast Jazz Festival, an annual jazz festival that continued under her leadership from 1992 through 2006.

== Family and education ==
Wells was born Veronica Burke on February 28, 1943. She came from a musical family. Among her fond recollections were the annual family gatherings at Thanksgiving and Christmas when, after dinner, the family would gather together to play the piano and sing. She was introduced to jazz when she was permitted by her parents at age 11 to attend the Howard Theater every Saturday. There she had to opportunity to see some of Jazz greats perform. She attended Howard University during 1960–1962, majoring in liberal arts. She was largely self-taught as a singer.

== Career ==
She sang in her church choir, leading her own group when she was 13, both as a singer and as a pianist. Her first experience singing jazz professionally was at age 20 with A Shade Mellow, a Washington, D.C., group consisting of five voices. She knew she wanted to be a professional vocalist when her sister, Shirley Heard, who was performing at a club, invited her to sit in. Her sister Wilhelmina was a member of the John & Wilhelmina Richburg singers. After singing the first song that is all it took. She knew then the music had chosen her. Her first single gig was in 1960 at the Tallyrand where she sang for 1 ½ years before she was approached by Bert Coleman, proprietor at the Top of the Foolery where she performed for 9 ½ years.

Although she often had a day job, Wells also toured Europe and South America, often performing in a group with her husband, pianist Ron Elliston. She also performed at the Kennedy Center, the Montpelier Arts Center in Laurel, Maryland, and at jazz festivals worldwide. She worked and recorded with the Widespread Jazz Orchestra and recorded regularly for her own Jazz Karma label. Wells was an assistant professor at the University of Maryland's Department of Music during 1983–2002. She developed and designed its first jazz vocal techniques workshop. She also worked with her husband, running the Elliston Music Studio for Jazz Studies; founded the Fish Middleton Jazz Scholarship Fund; and was one of the founders and directors of the five-day East Coast Jazz Festival, which began in 1992, running through 2006, which after a break around her death, was resumed in 2010 by her associate Paul Carr under the new name the Mid-Atlantic Jazz Festival.

== Personal life ==
Ronnie Wells-Elliston married Kenneth Wells and gave birth to their son, son Sean Wells. The marriage ended in divorce. She married Ron Elliston in 1982 and they were married until her death in 2007.

== Discography ==
- The Gift (Jazz Karma, 1984)
- After the Lights Go Down Low (Jazz Karma, 1990)
- Make Me a Present of You (Jazz Karma, 1992)
- After You (Jazz Karma, 1994)
- Mostly Ballads (Jazz Karma, 1997)
- Here I Am (Jazz Karma, 1998)
- Live at the 10th Annual East Coast Jazz Festival (Jazz Karma, 2001)
