= Ran Blake =

American pianist, composer, and educator

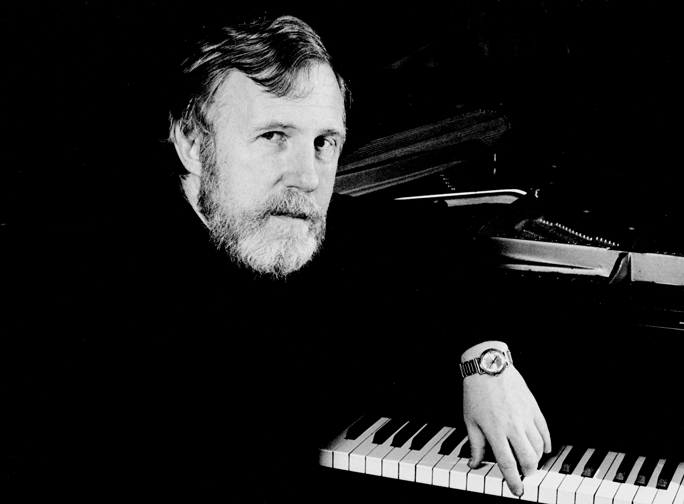
- Ran Blake at Bach Dancing & Dynamite Society, Half Moon Bay, California, June 14, 1987

Background information
- Born: April 20, 1935 (age 91); Springfield, Massachusetts, United States
- Genres: Jazz
- Occupations: Musician, composer
- Instrument: Piano
- Years active: 1950s–present
- Website: ranblake.com

Ran Blake (born April 20, 1935) is an American pianist, composer, and educator. He is known for his unique style that combines blues, gospel, classical, and film noir influences into an innovative and dark jazz sound. His career spans over 40 recording credits on jazz albums along with more than 40 years of teaching jazz at the New England Conservatory of Music, where he started the Department of Third Stream (now called the Department of Contemporary Musical Arts) with Gunther Schuller.

== Early life ==
Blake was born in Springfield, Massachusetts, on April 20, 1935. He grew up in Suffield, Connecticut, and became fascinated by film noir after seeing Robert Siodmak's Spiral Staircase as a twelve-year-old. He began playing piano as a young child, and as a teenager studied with Ray Cassarino. In his teenage years, he developed a love for gospel music and studied the compositions of Béla Bartók and Claude Debussy. After high school, he attended Bard College in New York, graduating in 1960 with a Bachelor of Arts degree in Jazz, a major that had not previously existed at the school. At Bard he met Jeanne Lee, with whom he performed for many years. He also studied with John Lewis, Oscar Peterson, and Gunther Schuller at the School of Jazz in Lenox, Massachusetts.

== Performing and studying ==
Beginning in the late 1950s, Blake was part of a duo with vocalist Jeanne Lee. Together they recorded his first album The Newest Sound Around, which was released on RCA in 1962, and the next year they toured Europe together. The album shows Blake's signature style beginning to develop, as they paid homage to Blake's early influences with a tribute to David Raksin's "Laura" and a reworking of the gospel standard, "The Church on Russell Street". Lee and Blake continued to play together throughout their careers and released another album in 1989 entitled You Stepped out of a Cloud.

Blake met Gunther Schuller in a chance encounter at Atlantic Records in 1959. Recognizing Blake's talent, Schuller asked him to study at the School of Jazz in Lenox, Massachusetts. This was a summer program that existed from 1957 to 1960. It was unique in that it brought together many of the world's foremost jazz musicians of the time, including Dizzy Gillespie and William Russo, to teach students about jazz for an intensive three weeks. Blake attended the School in 1959 and 1960. During his summers in Lenox, Blake began to develop his signature style. Schuller became a great friend and mentor to Blake throughout his career. Schuller organized the recording of The Newest Sound Around for Blake and Lee, and it was he who brought Blake to Atlantic Records, and later to the New England Conservatory.

Blake met jazz pianist, composer, and arranger Mary Lou Williams during a performance at The Composer, a New York nightclub. She later became a mentor and a significant influence on his work. During his time as a student at Bard, Blake often travelled to see Williams perform and to take lessons from her. Later, Williams and Blake worked together while she was a visiting faculty member at the School of Jazz.

In 1966, Blake released his first record as a soloist, Ran Blake Plays Solo Piano, on New York-based label ESP Disk.

== Educator ==
In 1967, Schuller, president of the New England Conservatory, recruited Blake to fill a faculty position as the Conservatory's Community Services Director. In this position, Blake was responsible for putting on concerts in prisons, retirement homes, and community centers. Blake remained in this role until 1973, when he took on the chairmanship of the new Third Stream Department (now Contemporary Improvisation) at the New England Conservatory, an initiative he started with Schuller.

Schuller coined the phrase "Third Stream" in 1957 during a talk at Brandeis University. According to Schuller, Third Stream is "a new genre of music located about halfway between jazz and classical music". This new genre was created, in Schuller's opinion, to combat purists in both the jazz world and the classical world: to play Third Stream music one had to be proficient in both.

When Schuller met Blake, two years after creating Third Stream, Blake's blend of influences, from free jazz and gospel music to classical composition and film noir soundtracks, appealed to him. When the two of them created the department at the NEC, it was natural that Blake would be the chairman. He remained in that position until 2005. He is a faculty member at the New England Conservatory.

Musicians Don Byron, Matthew Shipp, John Medeski, Frank London, Grayson Hugh, and Yitzhak Yedid have studied with Blake at NEC. He was awarded a Guggenheim Fellowship for composition in 1982 and a MacArthur Genius Grant six years later.

== Recording career ==
Blake has continued recording throughout his career as an educator and has amassed over forty recording credits on jazz albums. His first album with Jeanne Lee won the RCA Album First Prize in Germany, the 1980 Prix Billie Holiday, and is part of the Académie du Jazz.

After that album, he recorded primarily as a solo pianist, though many of his collaborative albums have received critical acclaim. In 1981, Blake recorded an album of songs by, or associated with, Duke Ellington, entitled Duke Dreams, which was awarded 4.5 stars by AllMusic,, a five-star rating in Down Beat and the All Music Guide to Jazz.

In 1986, he recorded Short Life of Barbara Monk with saxophonist Ricky Ford, which was selected by the Penguin Guide to Jazz to be part of their Core Collection. He has collaborated with a number of other musicians, including Jaki Byard, Houston Person, Steve Lacy, Clifford Jordan and Christine Correa.

== Educational philosophy ==
Blake's philosophy in teaching differs from that of many music educators, even in the jazz world. He calls his approach "the primacy of the ear". In 1977, he wrote an article for the Music Educator's Journal on having a career as a "Pop/Rock/Jazz instrumentalist". Blake also wrote Third Stream and the Importance of the Ear (1981), which served as a guide to his educational style, as well as an explanation and expansion upon the concept of Third Stream.

In the article, he stressed that "the ear is and should be of primary importance." He discussed the more practical aspects of a career in music and stressed the importance of luck and showmanship over education and background. Blake's focus on improvisation and ear training, coupled with his diverse influences, have made him one of the more innovative music educators of the jazz world. He invites the reader to view Third Stream composition as any composition that bridges two distinct musical cultures, not just classical-jazz fusion. He also stresses the importance of improvisation, and cites the need for improvisational education as one of the reasons he and Schuller started the Third Stream Department at the NEC. Blake argues that music is an aural art, and it must therefore be taught not by being "preoccupied with playing Chopin preludes on the piano or the latest copy of The Real Book (a popular jazz fake book) on the horn or guitar," but by dedicated listening, imitating, and improvising. He calls for students to listen and sing along to melodies on tape until they can reproduce the melody without the tape. It is essential, according to Blake, that a student do this before touching an instrument, as imitating the mechanics of a performance alone does not develop one's ear.

In 2010, Ran Blake published a book with Jason Rogers entitled The Primacy of the Ear. In the 144-page work, Blake details his thinking about the artistic process and distills his approach both to teaching and playing. It explores the relationship between the ear and the mind, musical memory, ear training exercises, and an approach to developing one's personal style.

== Discography ==
An asterisk (*) after the year indicates that it is the year of release.

=== As leader/co-leader ===
Year recorded	Title	Label	Notes
1961	The Newest Sound Around	RCA Victor	Duo, with Jeanne Lee (vocals); some tracks with George Duvivier (bass)
1965	Ran Blake Plays Solo Piano	ESP-Disk	Solo piano
1966/1967	The Newest Sound You Never Heard	A-side Records	Duo, with Jeanne Lee (vocals). Released in 2019.
1969	The Blue Potato and Other Outrages...	Milestone	Solo piano
1975	Breakthru	Improvising Artists	Solo piano
1976	Wende	Owl	Solo piano
1977*	Open City	Horo	Solo piano
1977	Crystal Trip	Horo	Solo piano
1977	Third Stream Recompositions	Owl	Solo piano
1978	Rapport	Novus	Some tracks solo piano; some tracks duo, with Ricky Ford (tenor sax); one track trio, with Rufus Reid (bass) added; one track duo with Anthony Braxton (alto sax); one track duo with Eleni Odoni (vocals); one track quartet, with Jerome Thomas (guitar), Reid (bass), Chris Connor (vocals)
1978*	Realization of a Dream	Owl	Solo piano
1978*	Take 1	Golden Crest	Solo piano
1978*	Take 2	Golden Crest	Solo piano
1979*	Third Stream Today	Golden Crest	With various, including Ricky Ford (tenor sax), Marty Erlich (alto sax), Hubert Powell (organ), Cleve Pozar (timbales)
1980*	Film Noir	Novus	With various, including Ted Curson, Spenser MacLeish, Frank London, Chris Pasin, Ingrid Monson (trumpet)
1981	Improvisations	Soul Note	Duo, with Jaki Byard (piano)
1981	Duke Dreams	Soul Note	Solo piano
1982*	Portfolio of Dr. Mabuse	Owl	With NEC Orchestra
1983	Suffield Gothic	Soul Note	Most tracks solo piano; some tracks duo, with Houston Person (tenor sax)
1985*	Vertigo	Owl	Solo piano
1985	Painted Rhythms: The Compleat Ran Blake, Volume 1	GM	Solo piano
1985	Painted Rhythms: The Compleat Ran Blake, Volume 2	GM	Solo piano
1986	Short Life of Barbara Monk	Soul Note	Quartet, with Ricky Ford (tenor sax), Ed Felson (bass), Jon Hazilla (drums)
1988	A Memory of Vienna	hatOLOGY	With Anthony Braxton (alto sax); released 1997
1989	You Stepped Out of a Cloud	Owl	Most tracks duo, with Jeanne Lee (vocals); some tracks trio, with George Duvivier (bass) added
1989	Masters from Different Worlds	Mapleshade	One track solo piano; two tracks duo, with Clifford Jordan (tenor sax, soprano sax); most other tracks with Jordan and some of Julian Priester (trombone), Windmill Saxophone Quartet, Steve Williams (drums), Alfredo Mojica (congas), Claudia Polley (vocals)
1990	That Certain Feeling	hatART	With Steve Lacy (soprano sax), Ricky Ford (tenor sax)
1991	Epistrophy	Soul Note	Solo piano
1994*	Round About		With Christine Correa (vocals)
1994	Unmarked Van: A Tribute to Sarah Vaughan	Soul Note	Most tracks solo piano; some tracks duo, with Tiziano Tononi (drums)
1998	Something to Live For	hatOLOGY	Most tracks duo, with Guillermo Gregorio (clarinet) or David Fabris (guitar)
1999*	Duo En Noir	Between the Lines	With Enrico Rava
2000	Horace Is Blue	hatOLOGY	With David Fabris, James Merenda
2001	Sonic Temples	GM	With Nicole Kampgen Schuller (alto sax), Ed Schuller (bass), George Schuller (drums, percussion)
2005*	Indian Winter	Soul Note	With David "Knife" Fabris (guitar)
2005	All That Is Tied	Tompkins Square	Solo piano
2006	Cinema Chatelet	Sans Bruit	Solo piano; promotional album
2008	Driftwoods	Tompkins Square	Solo piano
2009	Kaleidoscope	CIMP	With Jon Hazilla (percussion), Kara D. Rusch (keyboards, cymbals)
2010*	Out of the Shadows	Red Piano	Duo, with Christine Correa (vocals)
2010*	Camera Obscura	Inner Circle Music	With Sara Serpa (vocals)
2010	Ghost Tones	A-Side	Some tracks solo piano; some tracks ensemble; in concert; released 2015
2011*	Grey December: Live in Rome	Tompkins Square	Solo piano; in concert
2011*	Whirlpool	Jazz Project	With Dominique Eade (vocals)
2011*	Vilnius Noir	NoBusiness	Some tracks solo piano; some tracks duo, with David "Knife" Fabris (guitar); one track Fabris (guitar) solo
2012*	Aurora	Clean Feed	With Sara Serpa (vocals)
2012*	Tribute to Abbey Lincoln, Volume One	Red Piano	Duo, with Christine Correa (vocals)
2013*	Down Here Below	Red piano	With Christine Correa (vocals)
2014*	Cocktails at Dusk – A Noir Tribute to Chris Connor	Impulse!	Most tracks solo piano; some tracks duo with Laïka Fatien (vocals); some tracks duo with Ricky Ford (tenor sax)
2013–14	Kitano Noir	Sunnyside	With Sara Serpa (vocals); in concert
2015*	Chabrol Noir	Impulse!	Most tracks solo piano; some tracks duo with Ricky Ford (tenor sax); one track duo with Dominique Eade (vocals)
2015*	The Road Keeps Winding: Tribute to Abbey Lincoln, Volume Two	Red piano	With Christine Correa (vocals)
2017*	Town and Country	Sunnyside	Duo, with Dominique Eade (vocals)
2017*	The Dorothy Wallace Suite	ILK Music Records	Duo, with Kresten Osgood (drums)
2018	Eclipse Orange	Zoning Records	Duo, with Claire Ritter (piano)
2020*	Northern Noir	SteepleChase Records	Duo, with Andrew Rathbun (tenor saxophone)
2021	Looking Glass	A- Side Records	Solo piano
2022	Jobim Noir		Duo, with Sara Serpa; recorded at Ran Blake's living room, Brookline
2024	Where are You	Ran Blake	Duo, with James Robotham (saxophone)
2024	Deeper Life	Emily Mitchell	Duo, with Emily Mitchell (harp)
2025	Night Harbor	Jared Sims	Duo, with Jared Sims (saxophone)
