= Painted Rhythms: The Compleat Ran Blake, Volume 2 =

Recording by Ran Blake
- Recorded: December 1985
- Venue: Houghton Chapel, Wellesley College, Wellesley, Massachusetts; North Shore Music Theatre, Beverly, Massachusetts
- Genre: Jazz
- Label: GM
- Producer: Gunther Schuller

Painted Rhythms: The Compleat Ran Blake, Volume 2 is a solo piano album by Ran Blake. It was recorded in 1985 and released by GM Recordings.

== Recording and music ==
The album was recorded in December 1985 at Houghton Chapel, Wellesley College, in Wellesley, Massachusetts, and at the North Shore Music Theatre in Beverly, Massachusetts. It was produced by Gunther Schuller. Some of the tracks reflect Blake's interest in Spanish/Castilian Sephardic themes.

== Releases and reception ==
Professional ratings
Review scores
Source	Rating
AllMusic	3/5 stars
The Penguin Guide to Jazz	3/4 stars

Painted Rhythms: The Compleat Ran Blake, Volume 2 was released by GM Recordings. The AllMusic reviewer concluded that, "Throughout, Blake was quite concise (only 'Shoah!' exceeded four minutes and seven other sketches were under two), very expressive, and, as usual, totally individual."

== Track listing ==
1. "Maple Leaf Rag" (Scott Joplin) – 2:41
2. "Blue Monk" (Thelonious Monk) – 2:32
3. "Theme for Alto" (Rugolo) – 3:48
4. "Winter in Madrid" (Roland, Cascales) – 2:04
5. "Una hija tiene el rey" (Anonymous) – 1:12
6. "Una matica de ruda" (Anonymous) – 1:07
7. "Pase el agua, Julieta" (Anonymous) – 1:37
8. "Ah, el novio no quiere dinero" – 1:37
9. "Aquesta nit un mateix vent" (Mompou) – 1:58
10. "El cant dels ocells" (Traditional) – 1:10
11. "Jo et pressentia com la mar" (Mompou) – 2:38
12. "Shoah!" (Ran Blake) – 4:22
13. "Babbitt" (Blake) – 1:06
14. "Storm Warning" (Blake) – 3:27
15. "Vilna" (Olshanetsky, Wolfson) – 2:12
16. "Bahia (Na baixa do sapteiro)" (Barroso) – 3:43

== Personnel ==
- Ran Blake – piano
