= Dominique Eade =

American jazz singer and composer (born 1958)

- Born: Dominique Frances Eade; June 16, 1958 (age 68); London, England
- Genre: Vocal jazz
- Occupations: Singer, teacher
- Years active: 1980s–present
- Website: dominiqueeade.com

Dominique Frances Eade (born June 16, 1958) is an American jazz singer and composer. She has taught at the New England Conservatory.

== Education ==
She attended Vassar College and the Berklee College of Music before finishing her degree at New England Conservatory in Boston in 1984.

== Career ==
Eade was in a jazz band with Joe McPhee called Naima in the 1990s. In 1989 she became the first jazz performer to be awarded the New England Conservatory's NEC Artist Diploma.

== Discography ==
- The Ruby & The Pearl (Accurate, 1990)
- My Resistance Is Low (Accurate, 1995)
- The Sky Has Melted Away with André Vida and Brandon Evans (1995)
- When the Wind Was Cool (RCA, 1997)
- The Long Way Home (RCA Victor/BMG, 1999)
- Open with Jed Wilson (Jazz Project, 2006)
- Whirlpool with Ran Blake (Jazz Project, 2011)
- Town and Country with Ran Blake (Sunnyside, 2017)
