= Ran Blake Plays Solo Piano =

Studio album by Ran Blake
- Recorded: May 1, 1965
- Studio: New York City
- Genre: Jazz
- Length: 36:19
- Label: ESP-Disk

Ran Blake Plays Solo Piano is a solo piano album by Ran Blake. It was recorded in 1965 and released by ESP-Disk.

== Recording and music ==
The album of solo piano performances by Ran Blake was recorded in New York City on May 1, 1965. The material is a mix of standards, major jazz compositions, and four Blake originals.

== Releases and reception ==
Ran Blake Plays Solo Piano was released by ESP-Disk. The liner notes were written by Gunther Schuller. ESP issued the album on CD in 2014. Apart from "one very poorly distributed Italian bootleg CD in the mid-90s", this was its first appearance on CD.

The JazzTimes reviewer wrote that, in trying to combine "jazz, 'popular music' and classical styles [...] the pianist was probably still trying to figure out how to best utilize all of these resources. Still, Plays Solo Piano stands as an engaging session". The DownBeat review of the 2014 release commented that Blake "combined liberal dissonance and a pitiless editor's instinct for what to leave out, with a very light touch and an evident appreciation for the blues, albeit fairly abstract blues."

== Track listing ==
1. "Vanguard"
2. "Stratusphunk"
3. "Sleepy Time Gal"
4. "On Green Dolphin Street"
5. "Eric"
6. "There'll Be Some Changes Made"
7. "Good Morning Heartache"
8. "Sister Tee"
9. "Lonely Woman"
10. "Birmingham U.S.A."

== Personnel ==
- Ran Blake – piano
